= Jon P. Diamond =

American businessman

- Born: 1957 (age 68–69)
- Occupation: Businessman
- Known for: Co-founder of Safe Auto Insurance Company
- Spouse: Susan Schottenstein
- Children: 3
- Parent(s): Herbert S. and Zelda Diamond
- Family: Jerome Schottenstein (father-in-law); Jay Schottenstein (brother-in-law)

Jon P. Diamond (born 1957) is an entrepreneur from Columbus, Ohio who co-founded the Safe Auto Insurance Company.

== Biography ==
Jon P. Diamond was born to a Jewish family in Cleveland, Ohio and is the son of Herbert S. and Zelda Diamond. He began his professional career working at Diamond's Men's Shops. He joined Schottenstein Stores Corp. (SSC) in Columbus in 1983. Diamond served in various management positions from 1983 to 1993, including serving as Vice President of SSC from March 1987 to March 1993.

In 1993, Diamond co-founded the Safe Auto Insurance Company, a Columbus-based direct auto insurance writer with his brother-in-law Ari Deshe. He has held the title of Vice Chairman since November 2004 and President and Chief Operating Officer since 1996. The company specializes in providing affordable minimum coverage auto insurance to the non-standard insurance market. Diamond sold SafeAuto to AllState in October 2021. Diamond is a past director of Retail Ventures, Inc (RVI) and American Eagle Outfitters (AEO).

== Personal life ==
Diamond is married to Susan Schottenstein, the daughter of Jerome Schottenstein; they have three children, Jillian, Joshua and Jacob. He is the brother-in-law of Schottenstein Stores' CEO Jay Schottenstein and Safe Auto Insurance Company's CEO Ari Deshe (married to his wife's sister, Ann Schottenstein).

In addition to his business ventures, Diamond serves on numerous not-for-profit Boards and together with his wife Susan have extensive charitable interests.
