= Value City Arena =

Multi-purpose arena in Columbus, Ohio, United States

The Schottenstein Center
- The Schott

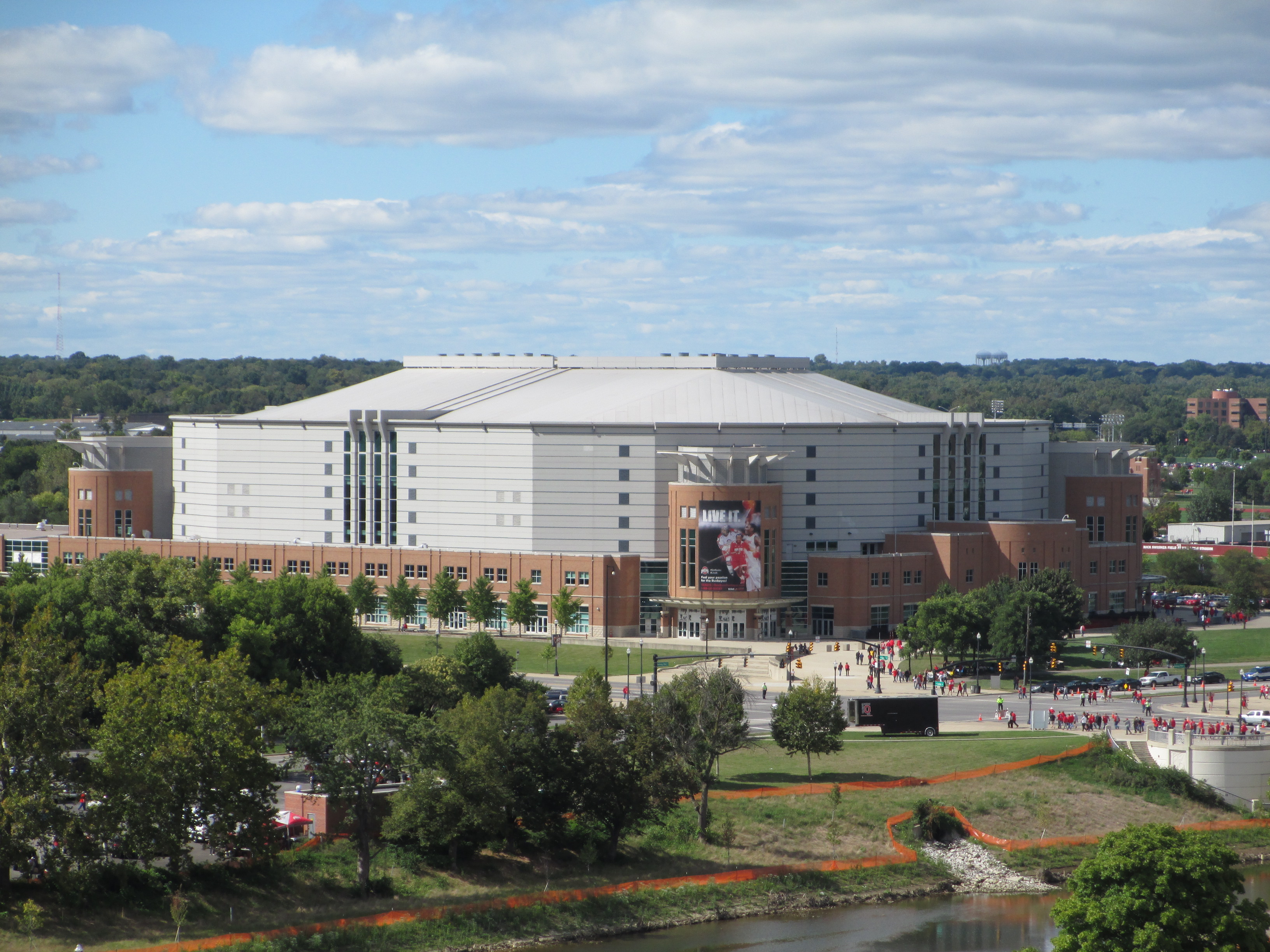
- Exterior view in 2014
- Interactive map of The Schottenstein Center
- Full name: Value City Arena at the Jerome Schottenstein Center
- Address: 555 Borror Drive
- Location: Columbus, Ohio, U.S.
- Coordinates: 40.007511°N 83.025102°W
- Owner: The Ohio State University
- Operator: Columbus Arena Management
- Capacity: 17,500 (ice hockey); 19,500 (basketball); 20,000+ (concerts)
- Public transit: 1

Construction
- Groundbreaking: March 2, 1996
- Opened: November 3, 1998
- Cost: $110 million ($226 million in 2025 dollars)
- Architects: Sink Combs Dethlefs; Moody Nolan
- Project manager: Gilbane
- Structural engineer: Korda/Nemeth Engineering Inc.
- General contractors: P.J. Dick, Inc.

Tenants
- Ohio State Buckeyes (NCAA); Men's basketball (1998–present); Women's basketball (1998–present); Men's ice hockey (1998–present)

Website
- schottensteincenter.com

Value City Arena is a multi-purpose arena, located on the campus of Ohio State University, in Columbus, Ohio, United States. The arena opened in 1998 and is currently the largest by seating capacity in the Big Ten Conference, with 19,049 seats, which is reduced to 18,809 for Ohio State men's and women’s basketball games.

It is home to Ohio State Buckeyes men's basketball, women's basketball and men's ice hockey teams. Previously, the basketball teams played at St. John Arena, while the ice hockey team played at the OSU Ice Arena. The facility is named the Jerome Schottenstein Center in honor of Jerome Schottenstein, of Columbus, late founder of Schottenstein Stores Corp. and lead benefactor of the project, while the seating bowl is named for Schottenstein's store Value City Furniture, naming rights which transferred to that entity after the original Value City department store chain went out of business in 2008.

The Schottensteins and Ohio State are currently in the process of finding a new naming rights partner for the arena, with Value City Furniture's own bankruptcy and wind down of operations which started in earnest at the start of January 2026.

== Relationship to Nationwide Arena ==
Prior to July 1, 2010, one of Value City Arena's major event competitors was the downtown Nationwide Arena, which opened in 2000 and is home to the NHL's Columbus Blue Jackets. In May 2010, the Blue Jackets and OSU signed a one-year, annually renewable, agreement to turn over day-to-day operations and non-athletic event booking of Nationwide Arena to OSU, effective July 1, 2010. This agreement put both arenas under the same management and made the facilities sister venues. As part of the March 2012 sale of Nationwide Arena to the Franklin County Convention Facilities Authority (FCCFA), the non-profit company Columbus Arena Management was created. The company, created by OSU, the Blue Jackets, the FCCFA and Columbus-based Nationwide Insurance, currently manages the day-to-day operations as well as budgeting and event bookings at both arenas, along with the Greater Columbus Convention Center.

== Buckeye Nuthouse ==
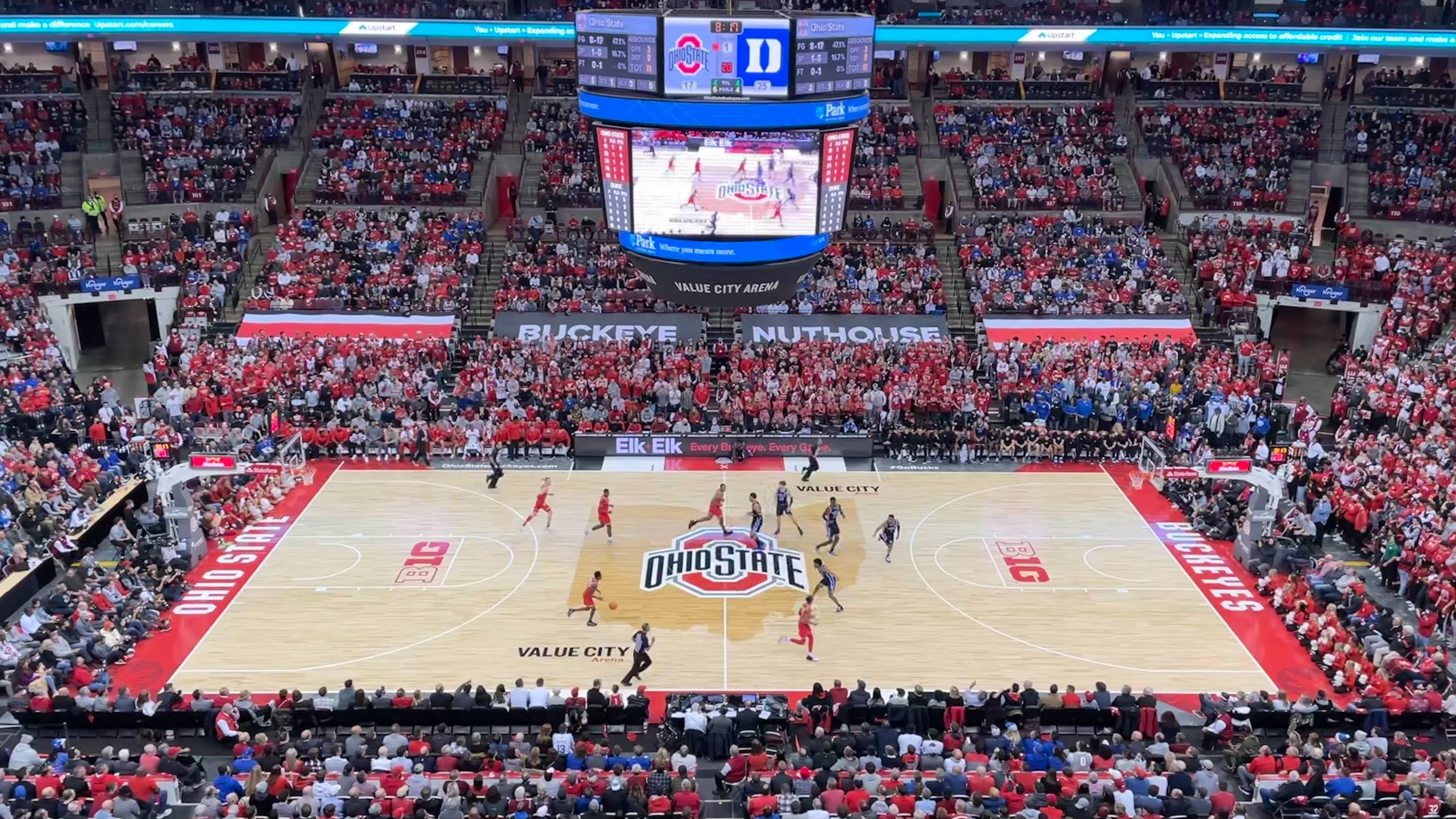
Buckeye Nuthouse at Value City Arena

The student section at men's basketball games is known as the Buckeye Nuthouse, a branch of Block O. From the time when the venue opened to the end of the 2009-2010 season, the students were seated behind the baskets. In response to the criticism for lacking the energy and gameday atmosphere seen in many other college basketball arenas, the athletic department reconfigured the student section in 2010 so that the students would then be seated behind the team benches allowing them to be visible on television broadcasts, as well as behind the basket that the opponent shoots at during the second half. In making this reconfiguration possible, 240 seats are tarped off behind the student section so that spectators seated behind the students could see the game without having to stand up, reducing its capacity to 18,809 during men's basketball games. To compensate for the revenue lost from the tarped-off seats, the student allotment was reduced from 2,000 to 1,400 tickets.

== Rankings ==
A 2016 ranking of toughest Big Ten arenas to play in by ESPN put Value City Arena tenth out of fourteen in the conference, citing its name as a contributing factor for not being tough. In 2014, a ranking of Big Ten conference arenas by the Chicago Tribune placed it at #11, and Scout.com put it at #99 overall out of 351 venues nationwide, behind Ohio University's Convocation Center, which was ranked #53, and the University of Dayton Arena, ranked at #28. Bleacher Report has called the arena too "generic" for the most expensive tickets in the conference, and The Gazette has opined it is "sterile", "cold", "devoid of charm", and lacks intimacy.

== Events ==
- On April 3, 1999, The Rolling Stones performed at the arena as a part of the No Security Tour.
- Jeopardy! College Championship - November 2002
- The Three Tenors had their last performance together at the arena.
- NCAA Men's Ice Hockey Championship - 2005
- The Circus Starring Britney Spears - April 30, 2009
- The music video for Carrie Underwood's 2010 hit "Undo It" was filmed at the arena.
- In 2015, Bruce Springsteen released a live recording of his 2005 performance at the arena titled Schottenstein Center, Ohio 2005; he returned to the arena on April 12, 2016 as part of The River Tour 2016 he also performed at the arena in 1999, 2002 & 2008.
- On July 27, 2016, Demi Lovato and Nick Jonas performed at the arena for their Future Now Tour.
- On October 18, 2016, the Cleveland Cavaliers hosted a preseason game vs. the Washington Wizards at the arena.
- On April 28–29, 2018, the Professional Bull Riders' Unleash the Beast Series visited Value City Arena for its first Columbus event since 2012. Prior to 2012, the PBR's premier series events in Columbus had been held at Nationwide Arena.
- On August 11, 2018 The Smashing Pumpkins performed their Shiny and Oh So Bright Tour.
- On November 27, 2018, the Dave Matthews Band performed the first show of their 2018 Fall tour. Their unique setlist at this show was well received, including the first performance of Kill the King since 2011 (and second since 2006).
- On October 20, 2019, Celine Dion performed at the arena for her Courage World Tour.
- On May 21, 2021, Twenty One Pilots filmed their Livestream Experience to help promote Scaled And Icy at the arena. Its synopsis ties in to the storyline from Trench, featuring numerous easter eggs concerning the band's lore.
- On September 23, 2021, Guns N' Roses played a show as a part of their 2020 Tour.
- On February 26, 2022, Dua Lipa played a sold out show as a part of her Future Nostalgia Tour.
- On May 13, 2022, AJR performed at the arena for their tour in support of their album "OK Orchestra".
- Comedian John Mulaney held a show for his "From Scratch" tour at the arena on May 20, 2022.
- The arena played host to All Elite Wrestling Dynamite on August 3, 2022.
- Singer/rapper Nicki Minaj played a show for her Pink Friday 2 World Tour on April 12, 2024.
- Rock band Beartooth, who are from Columbus, recorded and filmed their live album "I Was A… LIVE" at the arena on January 18, 2025.
- Rapper Tyler, the Creator played a show alongside Paris Texas and Lil Yachty as a part of Chromakopia: The World Tour on March 29, 2025.

== See also ==
- List of NCAA Division I basketball arenas

Preceded by Pauley Pavilion	Host of the Jeopardy! College Championship; 2002	Succeeded by Payne Whitney Gymnasium
Preceded by FleetCenter; Boston, Massachusetts	Host of the Frozen Four; 2005	Succeeded by Bradley Center; Milwaukee, Wisconsin
