= Retail Ventures =

Retail company

Retail Ventures, Inc.
- Type: Public
- Traded as: NYSE: RVI
- Industry: Retail
- Founded: 2003; 23 years ago
- Defunct: 2011
- Successor: DSW
- Headquarters: Columbus, Ohio, U.S.
- Key people: Jay Schottenstein (CEO)
- Website: www.retailventuresinc.com

Retail Ventures, Inc. was a holding company originally created in 2003 for DSW, Filene's Basement, and Value City Department Stores. The retailer's initial public offering was in 1991 under the Value City name. Value City went on to purchase the DSW shoe business in 1998 and Filene's Basement in 2000.

Schottenstein Stores Corp. of Columbus, which held controlling interest of Retail Ventures, also held a stake in the 221-store DSW chain. Jay Schottenstein, chairman and CEO of DSW, was chairman of Retail Ventures and heads Schottenstein Stores Corp. Value City Stores were known as Schottenstein's in the Columbus, Ohio market in honor of its founder Ephraim Schottenstein, but the name was later dropped.

Retail Ventures Inc stated in December 2006 that it had retained Financo, Inc. and CIBC World Markets Corp to advise it about "strategic alternatives", including a possible sale, for its Value City Department Stores division.

Retail Ventures Inc announced on January 23, 2008 the disposition of an 81% ownership interest in its Value City Department Stores business to VCHI Acquisition Co., a newly formed entity owned by VCDS Acquisition Holdings, LLC, Emerald Capital Management LLC and Crystal Value, LLC. In connection with the sale, Retail Ventures, Inc.'s wholly owned subsidiary Filene's Basement, Inc. entered into a $100 million secured credit facility with National City Business Credit, Inc. Terms of the credit facility are similar to the predecessor $275 million secured credit facility that was jointly shared with Value City Department Stores and was terminated and replaced as of the date of the transaction. This transaction does not impact Value City Furniture Stores, which are separately owned and operated. Retail Ventures, Inc. continues to operate 259 DSW stores in major metropolitan areas throughout the country. DSW also supplies shoes, under supply arrangements, to 342 locations for other non-affiliated retailers in the United States. The number of employees and employee benefits are planned to remain the same as this transfer of ownership occurs and the new owners begin to operate Value City.

Retail Ventures announced its merger with DSW in February 2011.

== Stores ==
- DSW

Through related companies:

- American Eagle Outfitters
- Value City Furniture
- American Signature
