= Jerome Schottenstein =

American businessman (1926–1992)

- Born: March 5, 1926; Columbus, Ohio
- Died: March 10, 1992 (age 66); Bexley, Ohio
- Education: B.A. Yeshiva University
- Occupation: Businessman
- Known for: Founder of Schottenstein Stores Corp.
- Spouse: Geraldine Hurwitz
- Children: Jay Schottenstein; Ann Schottenstein Desh; Susie Schottenstein Diamond; Lori Schottenstein
- Family: Jon P. Diamond (son-in-law)

Jerome Meyer Schottenstein (Hebrew: ג'רום\יעקב מאיר חיים שוטנשטיין, romanized: Jerome/Ya'akov Meir Hayyim Schottenstein; March 5, 1926 – March 10, 1992) was an American entrepreneur and philanthropist, co-founder of Schottenstein Stores Corp.

== Biography ==
Jerome Schottenstein was born to a Jewish family, the son of Ephrayim Schottenstein, a Lithuanian Jewish immigrant, and Anna Schottenstein.

In 1917, Ephraim opened a retail shop on South Parsons Avenue on Columbus, Ohio’s south side. The department store would later be expanded by the next generation of Schottensteins, Ephraim and Anna’s four sons: Leon, Saul, Jerome, and Alvin.

Jerome attended the Yeshiva University school for boys. After graduation, he joined his family's business which became Schottenstein Stores Corp. Holdings included Schottenstein’s Stores, Value City Furniture, American Eagle Outfitters, Designer Shoe Warehouse, and Consolidated Stores (later known as Big Lots).

Since 1980 he served as member of Yeshiva University's board of trustees. He contributed several buildings to the university, including the Schottenstein Center on its Wilf Campus in Washington Heights. That facility houses the Schottenstein Theater, Florence and Sol Shenk Synagogue and beit midrash, Philip and Sarah Belz School of Jewish Music, Dr. Lillian Chutick and Dr. Rebecca Chutick Recital Room, and Mr. and Mrs. Harry Gampel Communications Center.

Jerome was also a founder and honorary life chairman of the Columbus Torah Academy and a major contributor to the Wexner Heritage House and Leo Yassenoff Jewish Center. He helped Jews throughout the world through his involvement with Aish HaTorah World Centre in Jerusalem, Israel.

Jerome Schottenstein was also a major financial contributor to the Schottenstein Edition of the Babylonian Talmud, which is the first Orthodox non-academic English translation of the Babylonian Talmud since the Soncino Edition.

== Personal life ==
Jerome Schottenstein married Geraldine Hurwitz, with whom he had four children: Jay, Ann Schottenstein Deshe (married to Ari Deshe), Susan Schottenstein Diamond (married to Jon Diamond) and Lori Schottenstein. His sons-in-law, Ari Deshe and Jon Diamond, are the founders of Safe Auto Insurance Company. His daughter founded the Lori Schottenstein Chabad Center of Columbus in New Albany, Ohio.

== Legacy ==
In 1996, Ohio State University built the Jerome Schottenstein Center for sports in Columbus. The center pays tribute to Schottenstein's many contributions to the city of Columbus.
