= Aerie (clothing retailer) =

Intimate apparel brand of American Eagle Outfitters

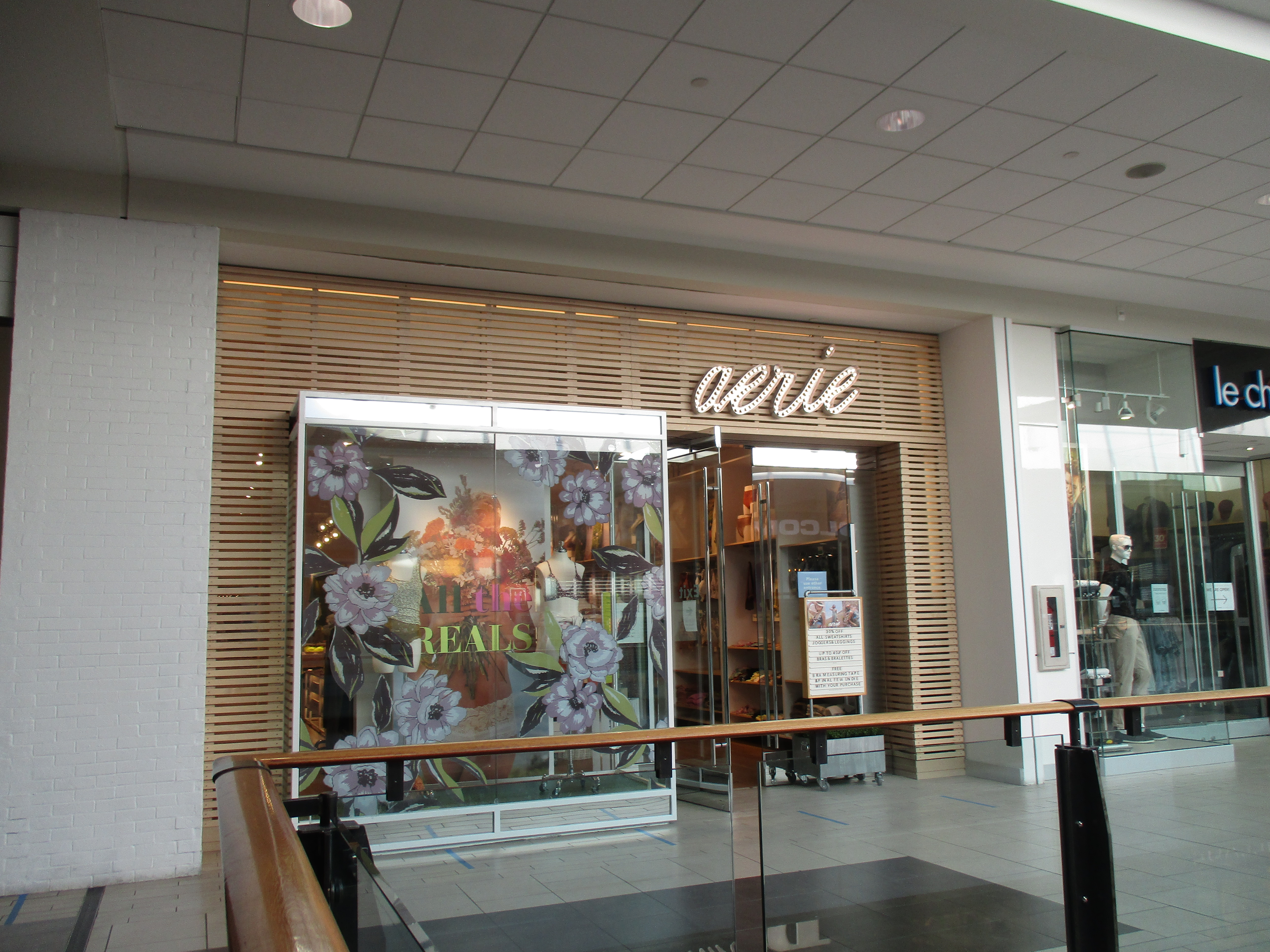
- Type: Subsidiary
- Industry: Retail
- Founded: 2006; 20 years ago
- Headquarters: 77 Hot Metal Street Southside Works, Pittsburgh, Pennsylvania, United States
- Number of locations: 448
- Key people: Jay Schottenstein (chairman and interim CEO)
- Products: Apparel, Activewear, Intimates, Swimwear
- Parent: American Eagle Outfitters
- Subsidiaries: OFFLINE by Aerie
- Website: www.aerie.com

Aerie, stylized as aerie, is an intimate apparel and lifestyle retailer and sub-brand owned by American Eagle Outfitters. In addition to lingerie such as a wide variety of bras and other undergarments, the aerie line also sells dormwear, active apparel, loungewear, accessories and sleepwear. The aerie brand operates as a section in American Eagle Outfitters stores, online through the American Eagle website, and in standalone aerie retail stores.

== History ==
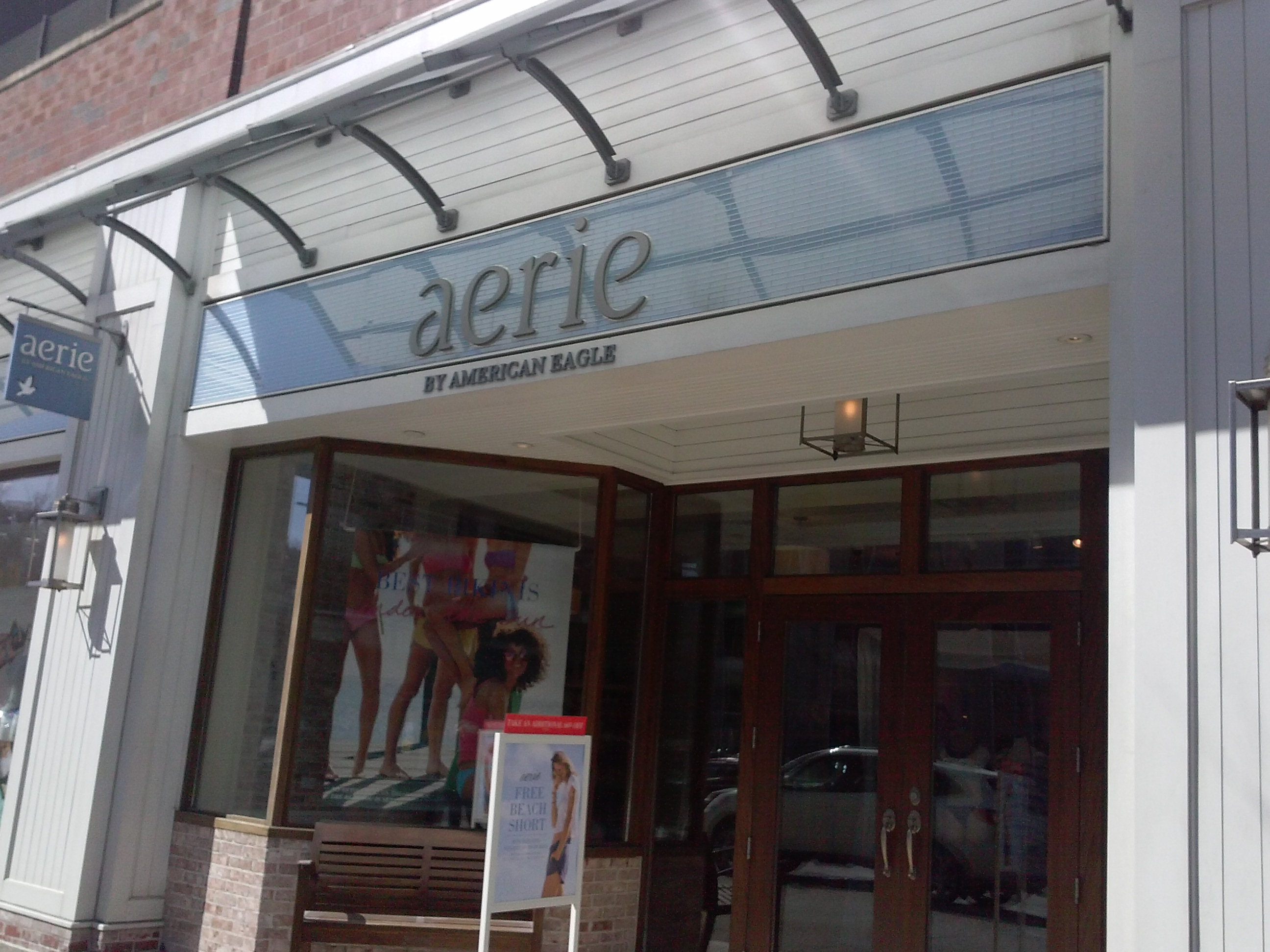
An aerie stand-alone store in Pittsburgh

In February 2006, American Eagle launched aerie lingerie, the company's first sub-brand. The first stand-alone aerie store opened in August 2006 in Greenville, South Carolina and was followed by two more test stores later that year.

As of December 2010, there were 147 stand-alone aerie stores in the United States and in Canada. In 2011, the company opened ten new aerie stores and had a 2% share of the lingerie market. Aerie now has a total of 448 stores in North America.

Aerie outperformed American Eagle's mainline brand during the second and third quarter in the 2013 fiscal year, despite a decline in store traffic.

== Campaigns ==
=== Aerie Real ===
"Aerie Real" is a body image campaign that was launched by aerie in spring 2014 in response to an announcement by American Eagle in January 2014. AEO released news that it was going to discontinue using supermodels and digitally retouching its models to encourage positive self-image and body positivity. The Aerie REAL campaign features models of various sizes, shapes and skin colors, along with showing their beauty marks and tattoos. The Aerie Real movement includes an online bra guide that showcases cup sizes 30A through 40DD worn by models with similar body types. The personalized shopping experience further includes a "Real Girl Talk" hotline with style and fit experts. They have also teamed up with Emma Roberts to further this campaign and provide a positive role model to younger girls.

As part of this campaign, aerie became the first national retailer to sponsor the National Eating Disorders Association (NEDA). Aerie is the leading sponsor of their national walks awareness program known as "NEDA Walk". The initiative raises funds for educational programs and spreads awareness about eating disorders. NEDA holds 65 walks every year in cities across the United States. This campaign has also had success reaching young women under the Twitter name #aeriereal.
