= New American Music Union =

- Genre: Pop, Rock music, and more
- Dates: August 8–9, 2008
- Locations: SouthSide Works, Pittsburgh, Pennsylvania
- Years active: 2008
- Website: Official Site

New American Music Union was a two-day summer music festival scheduled on August 8 and 9, 2008, at the SouthSide Works in Pittsburgh, Pennsylvania. Lineups on two different stages were curated by Anthony Kiedis of the Red Hot Chili Peppers. It featured established music acts along with college bands vying for a recording contract. The show was presented by American Eagle Outfitters and co-produced by Live Nation. It was designed to be a Pittsburgh version of Milwaukee's Summerfest and Seattle's Bumbershoot.

Scott Mervis of the Pittsburgh Post-Gazette reviewed the Gnarls Barkley performance favorably, while criticizing Bob Dylan's set list choices. Mervis' review resulted in several contrary letters to the editor.

The festival, which had been planned as an annual event, did not return for a second year because American Eagle Outfitters had moved away from using music as a marketing tool.

== College band competition ==
The college bands on the second stage were judged by a panel including industry and media professionals as well as other musicians. The winner received a full-day recording session in a recording studio in Los Angeles and promotion by American Eagle. The Black Fortys from Southern Illinois University were announced the winners of the best college band by Anthony Kiedis on Saturday August 9.

== Main Stage Performers ==
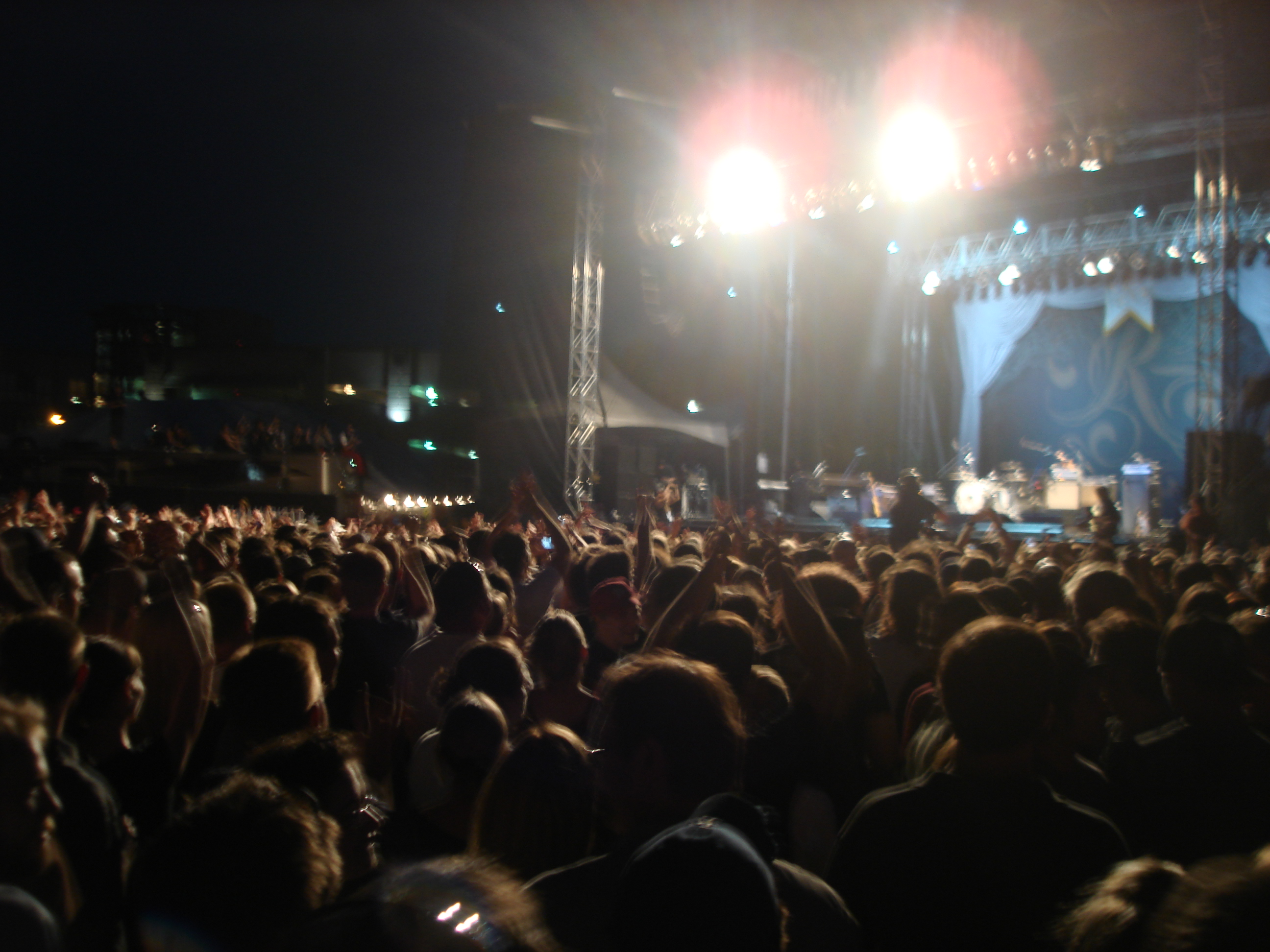
A view of the crowd

- Bob Dylan and His Band
- The Raconteurs
- The Roots
- Gnarls Barkley
- Spoon
- The Black Keys
- Tiny Masters of Today
- N.A.S.A.
- Black Mountain (band)
- The Duke Spirit

== College Stage Performers ==
- Gospel Gossip
- Bears
- Math the Band
- The Black Fortys
- Nothing Unexpected
- Magic Bullets
- The Delicious
- Elizabethan Report
- The Depreciation Guild
- Royal Bangs
- My Dear Disco
- The Steps
- The Flying Machines
- French Horn Rebellion
- The Company Kang
