= Mireille Issa =

Lebanese medievalist

Mireille Issa is a Lebanese medievalist born in Beirut. She studies the Late Latin period of Antiquity.

== Biography ==
After finishing her studies at the Sorbonne, Issa taught Latin at the Université Saint-Esprit in Kaslik, Lebanon. A member of several international literary societies and organisations, engaged in the study of medieval literature and of the literary history of the Crusades as told by their principal chroniclers such as Guillaume de Tyr (William of Tyre) & Jacques de Vitry, she has also investigated travel narrative texts of the post-Crusade period, as well as the Latin dissertations written by German and French humanists of the 17th and 18th centuries, and retracing the life of the law school of Berytus. In her translations, she has focused on Maronite religious literature written in Latin, whose founders were the disciples of the Maronite College founded in 1584.

== Sole authorship ==
- Le latin des maronites [The Latin of the Maronites] (anthology), Centre d’Études Latines de l’USEK, Paris, Librairie Orientaliste Paul Geuthner, 2017.
- Biinomikon, in collaboration with S.E.M. Joy Tabet, translation of a Latin study on the Roman jurisconsultes by Jean Bertrand (1617), Beirut, éditions Dergham, 2012.
- Les communautés orientales dans l’historiographie occidentale de la Croisade [Oriental Communities in Western Historiography of the Crusades], USEK Jounieh, Presses de l’Université Saint-Esprit de Kaslik, 2012.
- La version latine et l’adaptation française de l’Historia rerum in partibus transmarinis gestarum de Guillaume de Tyr, Livres XI-XVIII, [The Latin Version and the French Adaptation of William of Tyre's Chronicle], Turnhout, Brepols, Collection The Medieval Translator, nº 13, 2010.
- De Berytensi Jureconsultorum Academia, in collaboration with S.E.M. Joy Tabet, translation of a Latin dissertation made by Jacques Hasée (1716), Beirut, éditions Dergham, 2010.
- Berytus seu de Metropoli Beryto, translation of a Latin study on the triple antiquity of Beirut written by Johann Strauch (1662), Beirut, éditions Dar an-Nahar, 2009.
- Bullarium Maronitarum de Toubia Anaissi, in collaboration with Reverend Father Karam Rizk (OLM), Rome, 1911, editor Max Breitschneider, translation and commentary, Paris, Librairie Orientaliste Paul Geuthner, 2019.
- De nonnullis Orientalium urbibus tractatus brevis (Gabriel Sahiuni and Jean Hasruni), in collaboration with Reverend Father Joseph Moukarzel, translation and commentary, Turnhout, Brepols, Collection Miroir de l’Orient musulman, in progress.

== Collective authorship ==
- Le droit en littérature historiographique. Le cas du Rescriptum du siège de Tyr (1123) dans Willelmi Tyrensis archiepiscopi Chronicon [Law in Historiographic Literature in William of Tyre's Chronicle], in Miscellanea Juslittera, (dir. Jérôme Devard) 2017, juslittera.com
- In collaboration with Reverend Father Karam Rizk (OLM) : Le Liban du 12e siècle vu par Grousset : Pays de transition, de fiefs de compensation, et d’expansion, in René Grousset. Un Européen, historien de l’Asie [Lebanon in the 12th Century as Seen by Grousset: Country of Transition, Fiefdoms and Expansion] (dir. Gérard Dédéyan), Paris, Librairie Orientaliste Paul Geuthner, 2015.
- Les fonctions politique, théocratique et cathartique de la littérature épique [The Political, Theocratic and Cathartic Functions of Epic Literature] in Epic Connections / Rencontres épiques, éditions de Marianne J. Ailes et Philip E. Bennett, Edinburgh, Oxford University, 2015.
- Les chrétiens d’Orient vus par les voyageurs en Terre Sainte : Louis de Rochechouart entre réalité et sources, [Christians of the Orient as Seen by Travellers in the Holy Land], in Le Bilâd al-Shâm face aux mondes extérieurs. La perception de l’Autre et la représentation du souverain, (dir. Denise Aigle) published by the Ministry of Foreign Affairs (France) and the Centre National de la Recherche Scientifique (France), Damas – Beyrouth, Presses de l’IFPO, 2012.
- La divinité dans l’expression de la joie et de la détresse dans La Chanson d’Antioche [Divinity in the Expression of Joy and Distress in the Song of Antioch], in Le Souffle épique : L’esprit de la chanson de geste, Mélanges offerts par la Société Rencesvals à Bernard Guidot, Dijon, Éditions universitaires de Dijon, 2011.
- Reliques et merveilleux dans l’historiographie de la croisade : La Conquête de Constantinople de Robert de Clari [Relics and Wonders in the Historiography of the Crusades: Robert de Clari's Conquest of Constantinople, in Figures et lieux de la sainteté en Christianisme et en Islam, colloquium organized by CNRS (France) – Chaire Unesco, and Université Saint-Joseph in Beyrouth, Presses Universitaires de l’Université Saint-Joseph, 2010.
- With Reverend Father Joseph Moukarzel (OLM) : Abraham Ecchellensis Maronita. Biographie faite par Carlo Cartari, édition, traduction et commentaire du manuscrit Latin Vita Abraham Ecchellensis de l’Archivio di Stato di Roma, in Tempora, Annales d’Histoire et d’Archéologie, Université Saint-Joseph de Beyrouth, 2007–2009.
