= The Shoe Company =

Canadian shoe store chain

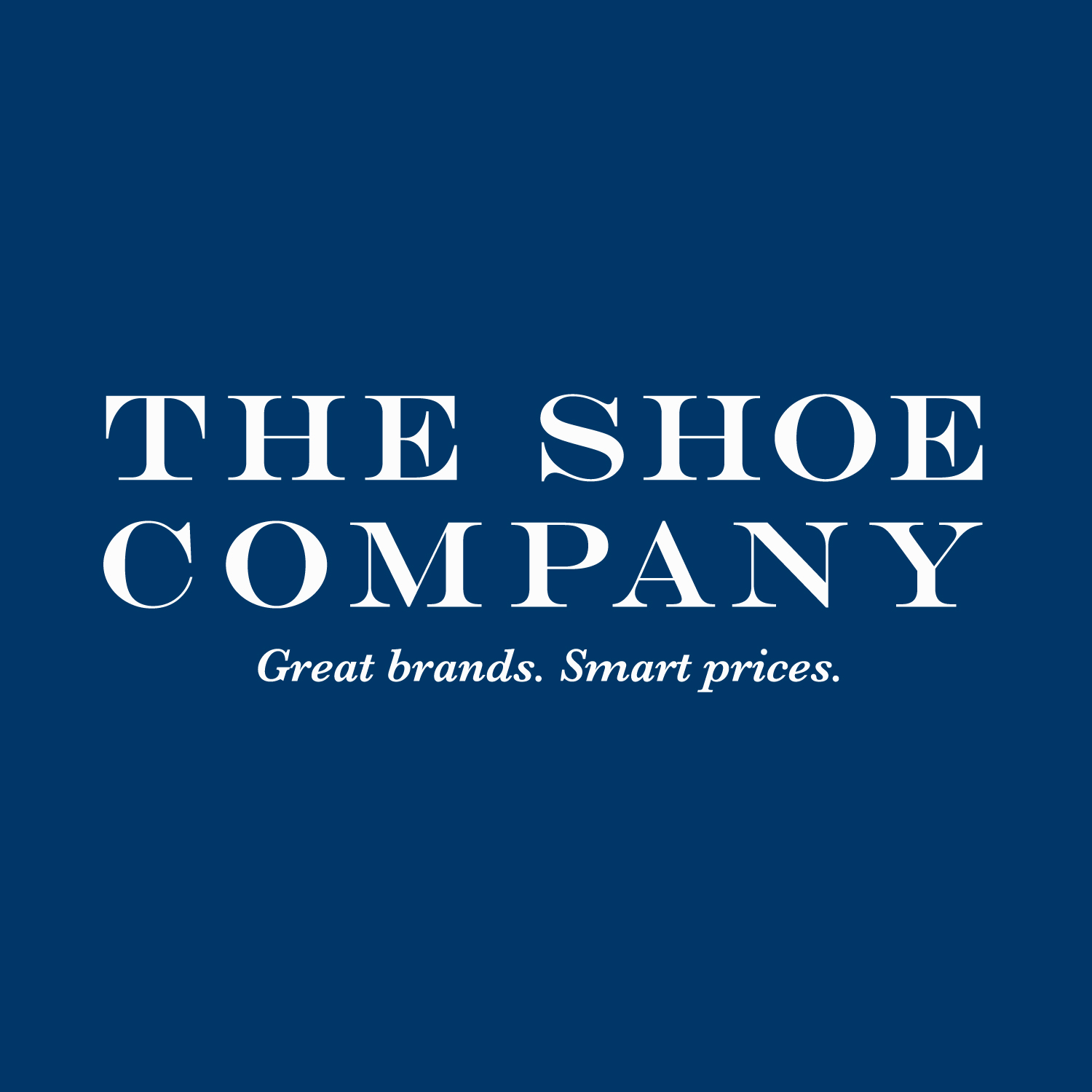
- Type: Subsidiary
- Founded: 1992 in Toronto, Ontario, Canada
- Headquarters: Toronto, Ontario, Canada
- Number of locations: 128
- Parent: Designer Brands
- Website: www.theshoecompany.ca

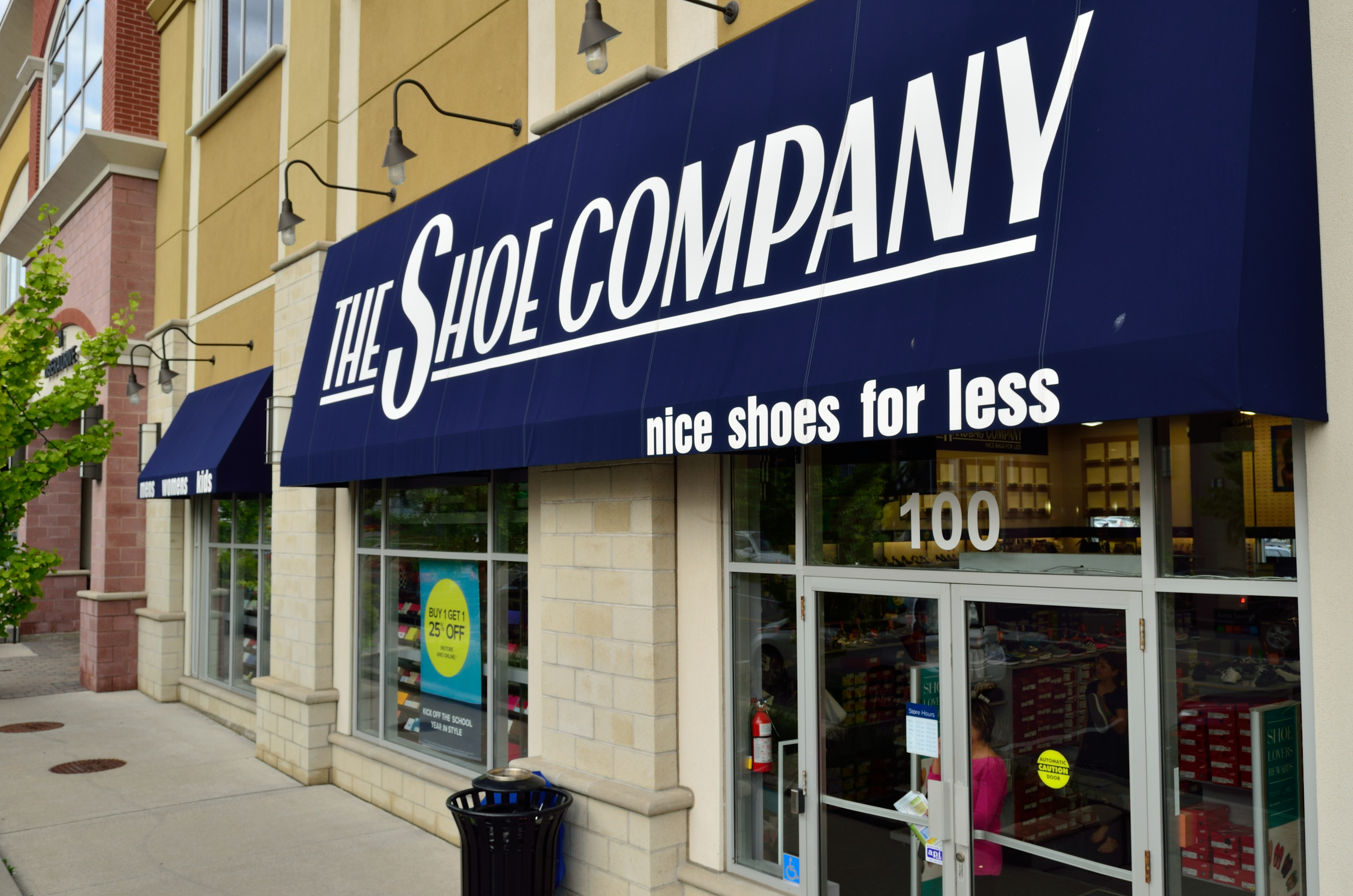
The Shoe Company store in Thornhill, Ontario

The Shoe Company was a Canadian shoe store, originating in Greater Toronto Area in 1992. From its inception, The Shoe Company was operated by conglomerate Town Shoes. The founder of Town Shoes, Leonard Simpson, had predicted a growth opportunity for footwear to be sold in a big box format.

== Acquisition ==
In 2014, DSW, Inc., now Designer Brands, Inc., acquired a 44% stake in Town Shoes and entered an agreement to open Shoe Warehouse stores in Canada. In May 2018, Town Shoes, along with The Shoe Company, were fully acquired by Designer Brands.

They currently operate over 140 stores coast to coast, and offer Canada's largest selection of branded family footwear.
