= Quiet Logistics =

Third-party logistics company

- Type: Subsidiary
- Industry: Third-party logistics
- Founded: 2009; 17 years ago, in Andover, Massachusetts, U.S.
- Founders: Bruce Welty; Michael Johnson
- Headquarters: Devens, Massachusetts, U.S.
- Area served: Worldwide
- Key people: Alden Miles (General Manager)
- Services: E-commerce order fulfillment, Returns management
- Number of employees: 1250
- Parent: American Eagle Outfitters
- Website: www.quietlogistics.com

Quiet Logistics is a third-party logistics (3PL) company headquartered in Devens, Massachusetts. Quiet specializes in providing order fulfillment and returns management services to e-commerce retailers. In November 2021, American Eagle Outfitters announced that it would acquire Quiet Logistics for $350 million in cash.

== Early years ==
Quiet Logistics was co-founded in 2009 by Bruce Welty and Michael Johnson. Both have backgrounds in supply chain management, having co-founded, in 1987, warehouse management system (WMS) vendor Allpoints Systems, in Norwood, Massachusetts, and, in 2003, Scenic Technologies Corp. Quiet was the first third-party logistics company to use Kiva Systems' warehouse robotics system. Kiva's system-directed robots transport in-bound and out-bound products throughout a warehouse, reducing labor costs and increasing inventory and order-fulfillment accuracy. In 2013, Quiet's use of this system was examined by Steve Kroft in a CBS 60 Minutes segment titled, March of the Machines. And in 2015, Quiet's operating model, including its early adoption of Kiva's robots, was the subject of a Harvard Business Review case study.

== Creation of Locus Robotics ==
In 2014, Quiet Logistics lost access to Kiva's robotics system when Amazon, who had acquired Kiva Systems in 2012 for $775MM, informed Quiet that use of the system was being limited to Amazon's own operations and, therefore, its contract with Quiet would not be renewed. Unable to find a replacement robotics system that met its requirements, Quiet designed, built, and integrated with its warehouse management system its own robot that is both system-directed and able to interact with fulfillment center employees dispersed throughout the storage areas. In 2015, Quiet spun off its robotics division as a separate company, Locus Robotics, located in Wilmington, Massachusetts.

== Fulfillment Centers ==
Quiet Logistics operates fulfillment centers in :

- Devens, Massachusetts
- Atlanta, Georgia
- Dallas, Texas

== Services ==
Quiet Logistics services offered include:

- Pick and Pack – Order fulfillment for e-commerce, drop shipping, retail stores, international and wholesale channels.
- Shipping and Delivery Management – Multi-carrier shipping optimization.
- Returns Processing – Reverse logistics and restocking services for apparel and lifestyle goods.
- Value-Added Services (VAS) – Custom packaging, kitting, embroidery, personalization, and other brand-specific fulfillment tasks.
- Warehousing and Inventory Management – Storage and SKU tracking across multiple distribution centers.

== Acquisition by American Eagle Outfitters ==
American Eagle Outfitters announced a $350 million acquisition of Quiet Logistics on November 2, 2021. The company's Chief operating officer stated the company would remain independent. The acquisition was completed on December 29, 2021.
