= SouthSide Works =

Mixed-used development in Pittsburgh, Pennsylvania, U.S.

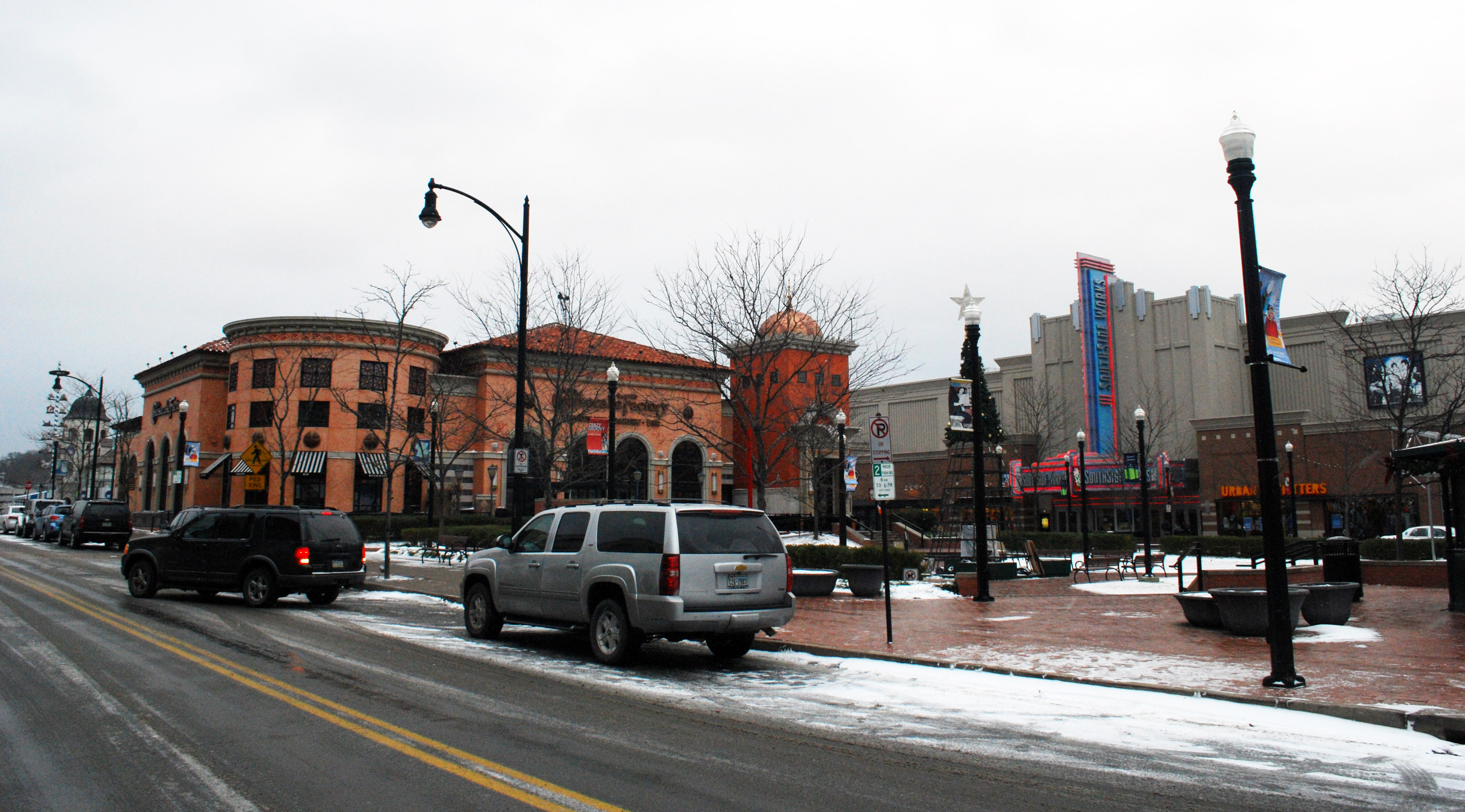
- Center court of SouthSide Works.
- Location: Pittsburgh, Pennsylvania, U.S.
- Coordinates: 40.4274°N 79.9652°W
- Opened: 2002-2004
- Floor area: 330,000 square feet (30,000 m^{2})
- Public transit: Port Authority bus: 75
- Website: www.southsideworks.com

SouthSide Works is an open-air retail, office, entertainment, and residential complex (often referred to as a lifestyle center) located on the South Side of the city of Pittsburgh, Pennsylvania, U.S. and just across the Monongahela River from the Pittsburgh Technology Center, the University of Pittsburgh and Carnegie Mellon University. The $300 million complex ($525.1 million today) opened in stages between 2002 and 2004 and offers more than 34 acres (140,000 m^{2}) of shops, offices, hotels and apartments, and has a new urbanist design. The site has over 330,000 square feet (30,000 m^{2}) of specialty retail, restaurant, hotel, and apartment space. In addition, the site has 700,000 square feet (70,000 m^{2}) of office space. The land is now owned by SomeraRoad Inc., which has invested +$100M in updating the live-work-play district and added a dog park, sport court, and town square.

== Site history ==
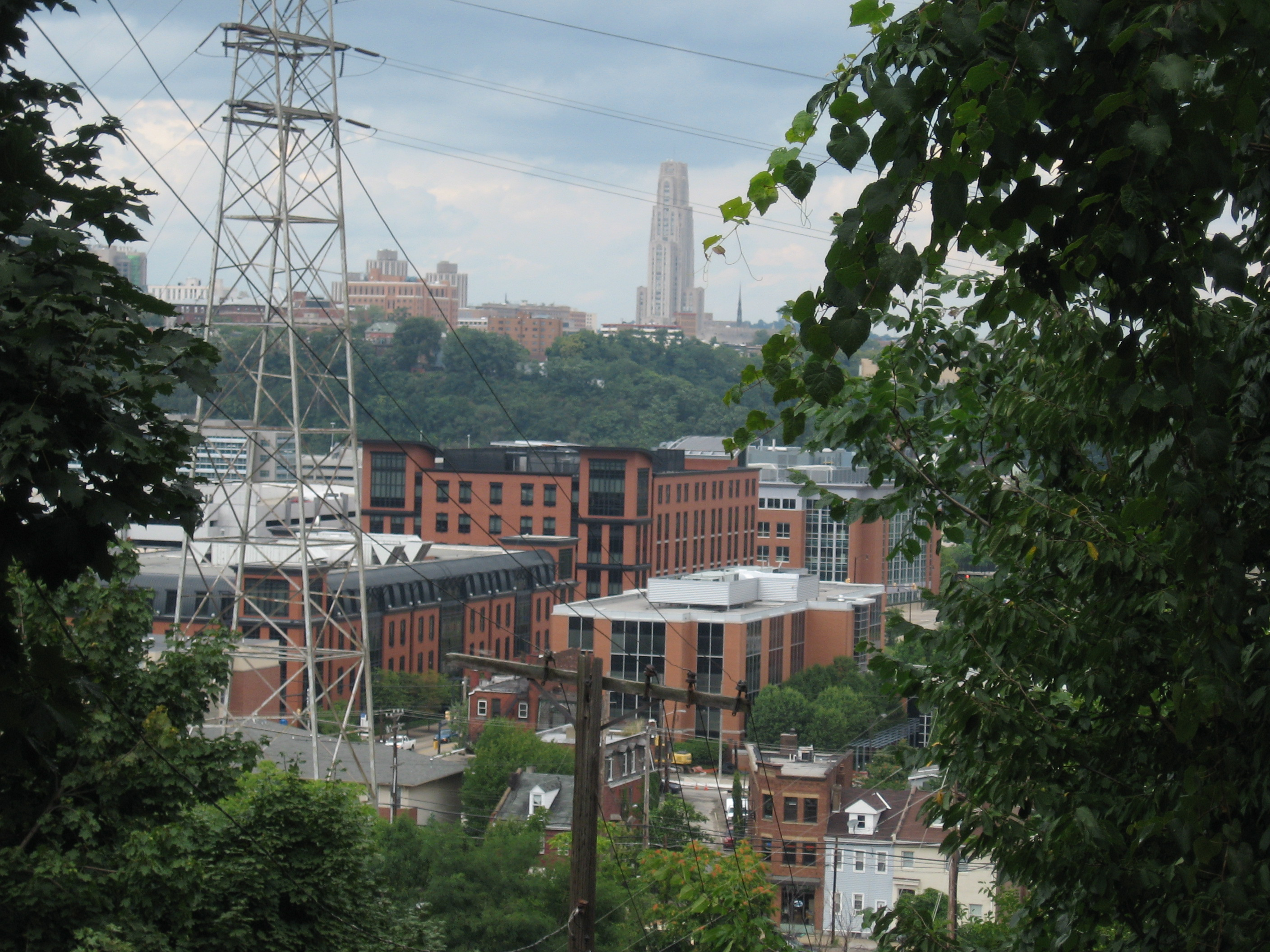
View of the SouthSide Works from the South Side slopes

The site first was used for industry starting in 1893 and was a long time steel mill. Ling-Temco-Vought (LTV) purchased Jones and Laughlin Steel Company in 1974 and merged with Republic Steel in 1985, which formed LTV Steel Co. LTV became the second largest steel producer in the nation. South Side Works was one of three LTV manufacturing facilities in Pittsburgh. One year following the merger, Republic Steel was forced to shut down as a result of foreign competition, high labor costs, and a lack of modern equipment. The property was abandoned until a city/county task force revitalized the area just south of downtown, and Pittsburgh-based Oxford Development Company and the University of Pittsburgh Medical Center constructed the state-of-the-art UPMC Sports Performance Complex on the most eastern boundary of the site. The Pittsburgh Steelers, of the National Football League, and the NCAA Division I University of Pittsburgh Panthers football teams both utilize the complex's cutting-edge equipment and fields as their primary training facility.

On December 15, 2012 the megaplex theater on site was host to Tom Cruise, Robert Duvall, Rosamund Pike & David Oyelowo for the world premier of Jack Reacher.

| 1893 | 1974 | 1993 | 1996 | 1997 | 1998 | 2000 | 2004 |
|---|---|---|---|---|---|---|---|
| Monongahela Water Company first develops site | LTV acquires J&L Steel | The Urban Redevelopment Authority (URA) of Pittsburgh purchases the site | The URA purchases the former Hot Metal and MONCON Bridges | URA completes design of the renovation of the MONCON Bridge | LTV ends operations and demolishes the facilities in its steam plant in SouthSide Works | Renovations of the MONCON Bridge is completed | A series of mixed-use structures are completed |

== Site development ==
There were environmental concerns associated with the site's redevelopment. The contaminants were PCBs and Iron and Cyanide Metals. The total actual cost of remediation was $265 million, and the project was funded by both the private and public sector. In 1996–1997, the Urban Redevelopment Authority completed major remediation, yet continued to model and assess groundwater on the site for contamination. As of 1998, most of the assessment had concluded, and as a result the site was safe for redevelopment. Developers, however, were required to clean up any contamination discovered during construction, and to implement a Health and Safety Plan.

Tax Increment Financing (TIF) was used, and adopted by the city, county, and school districts, to raise public funds for public infrastructure development. The TIF generated $25 million and was used for road and infrastructure improvements along with filling budget gaps for public parking structures. The site is a mix of office, medial, recreational, housing and retail use. The site generated private investment of $250 million, has 5,400 employment opportunities, 400 housing units, and 1,500 jobs were created during the initial development period.

Project Financing (projected)

- $23,427,461 City/URA Funding
- $16,250,000 Private Garage Funding
- $16,992,000 State Funding
- $12,525,000 Pittsburgh Water and Sewer Authority
- $25,000,000 Tax Increment Financing
- $11,000,000 HUD Section 108 Loans
- $1,500,000 HUD Brownfields Economic Development Initiative (BEDI) Grant
- $1,000,000 HUD Economic Development Initiative (EDI) Grant
- $7,245,039 Other Sources
- $103,666,500 Total

== Anchor tenants ==
- American Eagle Outfitters Global Headquarters
- REI
- UPMC Sports Medicine Complex

== Apparel ==
- Aerie
- Urban Outfitters

== Restaurants & bars ==
- Hofbräuhaus
- The Cheesecake Factory
- McCormick & Schmick's
- Qdoba Mexican Grill

== Further plans ==
A 38,000 sq ft (3,500 m^{2}) fitness center is being considered, as well as the completion of close to 350,000 sq ft (33,000 m^{2}) of 2nd and 3rd floor office space above the complex. A riverfront pavilion is also planned for hosting smaller concerts by touring groups as well as the local Pittsburgh Symphony Orchestra.

A 200-room hotel and 150 unit condo are also planned for the site.

== Other ==
- New American Music Union
