= Bruce Welty =

American businessman

- Born: October 9, 1956 (age 69); Minneapolis, Minnesota, U.S.
- Education: Colorado College; Boston College Carroll School of Management
- Occupation: Entrepreneur
- Years active: 1987–present
- Known for: Co-founder and former Chairman and CEO of AllPoints Systems, Quiet Logistics, and Locus Robotics

Bruce Welty (born October 9, 1956) is an American entrepreneur and businessman who designs and builds warehouse management systems (wms) and e-commerce order fulfillment systems. Welty is a founder of AllPoints Systems, Inc., Quiet Logistics, Inc., and Locus Robotics Corporation. He is the former chairman of the board for Locus and former chief executive officer and chairman of the board for Quiet Logistics. Mr. Welty holds 11 patents. His media appearances include 60 Minutes, CNN, CNBC and Bloomberg News.

== Early life and education ==
Bruce Welty was born in Minneapolis, Minnesota. In 1972, he moved with his family to Concord, Massachusetts, where he attended Concord-Carlisle High School. In 1979, he received a Bachelor of Arts in mathematics from Colorado College and later attended the graduate program at Boston College's Carroll School of Management.

== Early career and AllPoints Systems ==
Bruce Welty began his career at PricewaterhouseCoopers' information technology group, where he worked in their logistics software consulting practice.

In 1987, Welty and Michael Johnson co-founded the supply chain execution software company AllPoints Systems, Inc., in Norwood, Massachusetts. The firm specialized in mid-market warehouse management systems (WMS) and e-commerce order fulfillment. In 2001, it was acquired by EXE Technologies, where Welty became Senior Vice President of Marketing.

In 2005, After the sale of AllPoints Systems, Inc., Bruce and his partner Michael Johnson formed Scenic Technology Corporation., a company that continued their focus on developing warehouse management systems. In 2008 they saw a Kiva robot, a mobile robot within a warehouse that brings inventory to workers rather than workers going to the inventory, and decided to restructure their business around robotic fulfillment.

== Quiet Logistics ==
In 2009, Bruce Welty and his longstanding business partner from AllPoints Systems, Michael Johnson, co-founded third-party logistics company Quiet Logistics, in Devens, Massachusetts. The firm specializes in e-commerce order fulfillment and was an early adopter of Kiva Systems' automated warehouse robotics system. The fulfillment company became one of the first to use mobile robots for e-commerce fulfillment. They were the first 3PL to use Kiva technology. In 2013, Welty was interviewed by Steve Kroft for a CBS 60 Minutes segment on the impact of robots in the workplace.

Between 2009 and 2012 Quiet Logistics grew to 400 employees servicing 28 brands including Bonobos, Gilt Groupe and Zara.

In 2012, Amazon.com acquired Kiva Systems for $775M. In 2014, Amazon notified Quiet that it was reserving use of the Kiva robotics system for its own operations and would not be renewing Quiet's existing agreement signed with Kiva Systems prior to Amazon's acquisition of Kiva. This decision put Quiet Logistics' business model in jeopardy and in 2014 Harvard Business School wrote a case study about the strategic uncertainty the company faced with the loss of Kiva. Welty and Johnson began searching for a next-generation warehouse robot. Unable to find one that met their requirements, they began developing their own and founded Locus Robotics in 2015.

In 2016, the board of Scenic Technology decided to split the business into three companies forming Scenic Holdings, LLC, Quiet Logistics, Inc. and Locus Robotics Corp. Welty was named chairman of the Board of all three.

In 2018 Quiet Logistics was sold to a joint venture formed between The Related Companies and Greenfield Partners with Mr. Welty becoming the CEO of Quiet and resigning his board positions on Scenic and Locus. The company focused on expansion and in 2019 opened its 5th warehouse facility when it expanded to the West Coast by opening in Los Angeles. The expansion continued as they grew from 5 to 8 fulfillment centers between 2019 and 2021, with Welty becoming Vice Chairman of Quiet Logistics in 2020.

The following year, In 2021, Quiet Logistics was acquired by American Eagle for $350 million.

== Locus Robotics ==
Originally founded by Welty and Johnson as a replacement for the Kiva robots used in Quiet Logistics, Locus began incubating within Quiet Logistics in 2012. The new Locus robots allowed warehouse workers to stay in a confined area in the facility and load the products onto the robots, while the robots took over the task of moving to various product locations. Locus became its own company in 2015, and began selling its warehouse robotics product - LocusBots.

In 2017 Locus secured their first major customer-the world's largest 3PL, DHL Worldwide Express. In 2019 Locus expanded into Europe. They opened their EU headquarters in Amsterdam in November 2021.

Locus Robotics reached “unicorn” status (a valuation of $1 billion) on February 10, 2021.

At the end of 2022 Locus was valued at nearly $2 billion.

== Boards ==
Bruce Welty is currently on the advisory board of Mass Robotics. He served as Vice Chairman of Quiet Logistics, Inc. until its acquisition by American Eagle in 2021. He is the founder and former chairman of the Board of Quiet Logistics and founder and former chairman of the Board of Locus Robotics.

He served on the board of directors for Voxware from 2000 to 2001
