= Designer Brands =

American shoe and accessory retailer

Designer Brands Inc.
- Formerly: Shonac Corporation; DSW, Inc.
- Type: Public
- Traded as: NYSE: DSW (2005-2019); NYSE: DBI (Class A)
- Industry: Retail
- Founded: January 20, 1969; 57 years ago
- Headquarters: Columbus, Ohio, United States
- Number of locations: United States: 504; Canada: 26 (2025)
- Key people: Jay Schottenstein (chairman); Doug Howe (CEO); Jared Poff (CFO)
- Revenue: ▼US$3.07 billion (2023)
- Operating income: ▼US$162.4 million (2023)
- Net income: ▼US$29.2 million (2023)
- Total assets: ▲US$2.07 billion (2024)
- Total equity: ▼US$359 million (2024)
- Number of employees: ≈ 14,000 (2024)
- Subsidiaries: Town Shoes (shut down); The Shoe Company
- Website: www.designerbrands.com

Designer Brands Inc. is an American company that sells designer and name brand shoes and fashion accessories. It owns the Designer Shoe Warehouse (DSW) store chain, and operates over 500 stores in the United States and an e-commerce website.

The company also owns private-label footwear brands including Audrey Brooke, Kelly & Katie, Lulu Townsend, and Poppie Jones.

== History ==
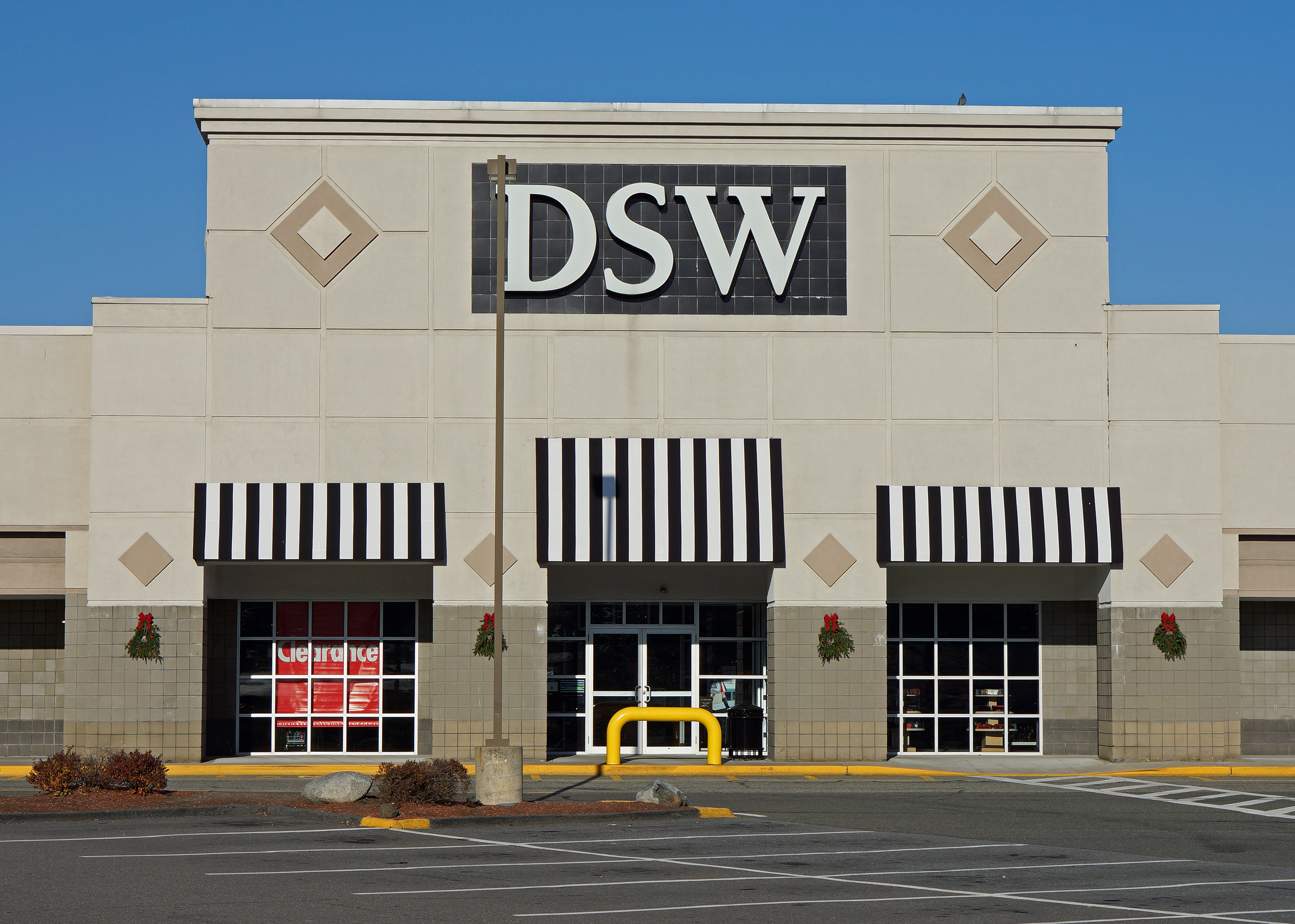
DSW store in Saugus, Massachusetts

The company was founded in 1969 as Shonac Corporation, as the shoe licensee for Value City. In July 1991, the company opened its first store, which was in Dublin, Ohio. In 1998, the company was acquired by Value City. By 1999, the company had 48 stores.

In December 2004, the company was acquired by Retail Ventures, an affiliate. In March 2005, the company experienced massive data theft, including customer data from 1.4 million credit card transactions. In June 2005, the company became a public company via an initial public offering. In April 2008, the company launched its e-commerce website.

In 2011, the company acquired Retail Ventures, its largest shareholder. In 2014, the company acquired 44% of Town Shoes, a chain of Canadian shoe stores, and entered into a licensing agreement for the DSW name. In February 2016, the company acquired Ebuys for $62.5 million. In July 2016, the company added shoes for children to its inventory. In August 2016, the company entered into a franchising agreement with Apparel Brands to open DSW stores in the Middle East.

In March 2017, the company reached a deal with Under Armour to carry Under Armour shoes in DSW stores. In June 2017, the company opened a store in Oman, its first store in the Middle East. In May 2018, the company acquired the remaining shares of Town Shoes to obtain complete ownership of the company.

In February 2019, the company announced an addition of nail salons to 5 stores, after testing the concept in 2 stores in Columbus, Ohio. In March 2019, DSW rebranded their corporate name to Designer Brands. The company also changed its ticker symbol on the NYSE from "DSW" to "DBI" effective April 2, 2019.

Entertainer Jennifer Lopez collaborated with the brand to launch the March 2020 line. When the chain closed all its retail stores due to the COVID-19 pandemic, and fashion trends shifted as a result of the increase in remote work, the line was redesigned to include sneakers and comfort shoes.
