= Safe Auto Insurance Company =

Car Insurance Company

- Type: Private
- Industry: Insurance & Finance
- Founded: 1993
- Headquarters: 4 Easton Oval, Columbus, Ohio 43219; United States
- Key people: Ron Davies (President and CEO); Ari Deshe (Cofounder and Executive Chairman); Jon Diamond (Cofounder and Executive Chairman)
- Products: Private-passenger auto insurance
- Website: SafeAuto.com

Safe Auto Insurance Company is an American property and casualty auto insurance carrier. It is a privately held carrier and provider of state-minimum private-passenger auto insurance for drivers in the nonstandard insurance market in 20 states across the US, including Oregon, Ohio, Indiana, Kentucky, Georgia, Pennsylvania, South Carolina, Tennessee, Louisiana, Mississippi, Illinois, Missouri, Arizona, Oklahoma, Kansas, Virginia, Texas, California, Alabama, and Colorado.

== History ==
SafeAuto is a property and casualty auto insurance carrier based in Columbus, Ohio. In the summer of 1993, SafeAuto began in its original headquarters on Goodale Boulevard and specialized in providing auto insurance to those individuals who needed state-minimum coverage. SafeAuto is now a leader in direct to consumer minimum-limit insurance across 20 states.

SafeAuto was acquired by AllState via National General June 1, 2021.

== Operations ==
SafeAuto is licensed in 22 states, markets in 19 states, and employs more than 700 associates across its headquarters in Columbus, Ohio, and its satellite offices in Woodsfield, Ohio, and Somerset, Kentucky. SafeAuto's annual revenue was more than $300 million in 2013. Since 2012, Ron Davies, former senior vice president with Allstate Insurance Co, took over the role of CEO; Diamond and Deshe remain involved with the company as chairmen and executive directors of the company's board. Davies has since opened two SafeAuto storefronts in Columbus, Ohio, to serve customers face to face. In March 2015, SafeAuto acquired AutoTex MGA and began expanding to the independent agent insurance business.

== Target demographic ==
SafeAuto targets the nonstandard auto insurance market, in which it has specialized for over 20 years in providing liability coverage that meets states' required minimum limits. Deshe and Diamond founded the company on the idea that SafeAuto could serve this market, which includes high-risk drivers and drivers who require an SR-22 that other companies were hesitant to insure, better than any other insurance company could. Their commercials, reflecting this target demographic, often emphasize the possible consequences if caught driving without insurance.

== See also ==
- List of United States insurance companies
