= Value City =

Former american department store chain

Value City Department Store
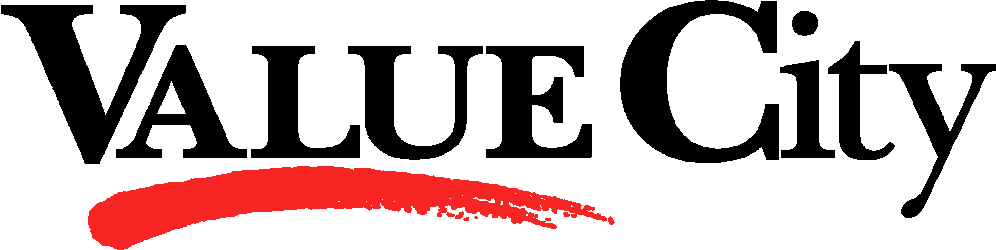
- Type: Subsidiary
- Industry: Retail
- Founded: 1917; 109 years ago
- Founder: Ephraim Schottenstein
- Defunct: 2008; 18 years ago
- Fate: Chapter 11 Bankruptcy; Liquidation Sale
- Headquarters: Columbus, Ohio, U.S.
- Area served: United States
- Products: Clothing, jewelry, and home goods, furniture
- Revenue: -$3,000,000 (2008)
- Parent: VCHI Acquisition Company

Value City Department Stores was an American department store chain with 113 locations. It was founded in 1917 by Ephraim Schottenstein, a travelling salesman in central Ohio. The store was an off-price retailer that sold clothing, jewelry, and home goods below the manufacturer suggested retail price. The chain focused on buyout and closeout merchandise, and occasionally irregular apparel and factory seconds. The stores were branded Schottenstein's in the Columbus, Ohio, market. The Schottenstein name was dropped in 2008. Also, three stores in Metro Detroit were co-branded as Crowley's Value City. From 1984 to 1995, Schottenstein also owned Shifrin-Willens, a jewelry store.

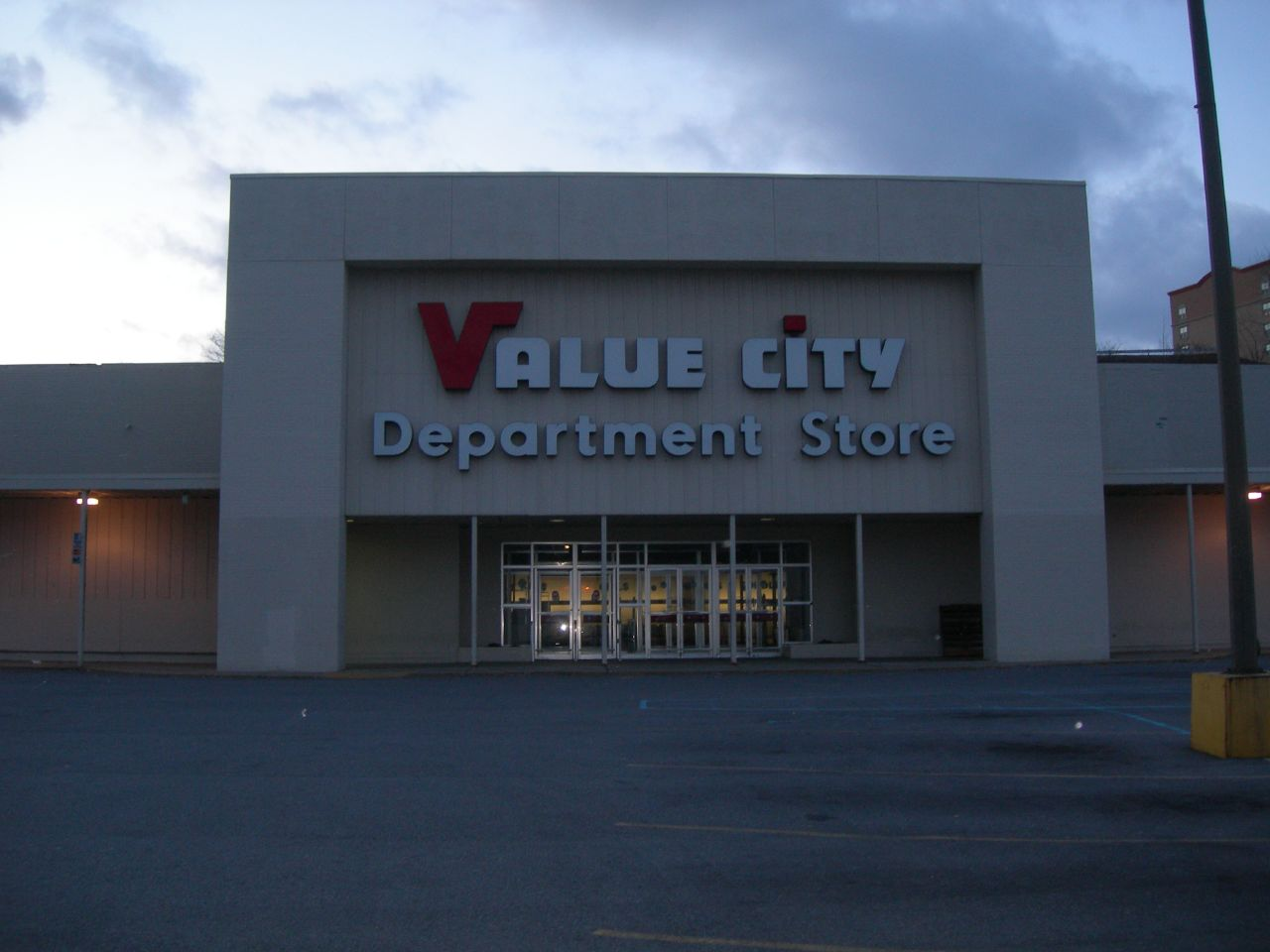
Typical style Value City Department Store Building.

The first store was located in Columbus, Ohio, at 1887 Parsons Avenue on the corner of Parsons Avenue and Reeb Avenue, and has been closed since 2006. It was formerly affiliated with Value City Furniture, which has 130 stores and was founded in 1948. (VCF is corporate sponsor of Value City Arena, home of the Ohio State University women and men's basketball programs.)

They entered the St. Louis, MO market in 1995, opening in Webster Groves in St. Louis County. At that time, Value City had 79 stores.

They acquired the Grandpa's discount chain in 1999, which included 15 stores in the St. Louis area.

Retail Ventures originally sought to sell the Value City operation to focus on its more profitable brands. The chain announced its intention in 2007 to sell up to 24 stores to Burlington. However, on January 23, 2008, Retail Ventures announced it was selling an ownership stake in Value City to newly formed VCHI Acquisition Company. The company continued to close selected stores through 2008 while revamping and reorganizing the merchandise approach in those which were retained. On October 27, 2008, Value City announced that the chain was filing for bankruptcy and that all remaining stores would close. The sales were completed on December 23, 2008.
