= Town Shoes =

Canadian chain of shoe stores

Town Shoes Ltd.
- Type: Subsidiary
- Founded: 1952; 74 years ago
- Founder: Leonard Simpson
- Defunct: January 2019; 7 years ago
- Fate: Shut down
- Headquarters: Toronto, Ontario, Canada
- Number of locations: 38 (2018)
- Parent: DSW, Inc.

Town Shoes Ltd. was a Canadian chain of shoe stores founded by Leonard Simpson in 1952.

The business had 38 locations operating across Canada. Additionally, it operated two banners The Shoe Store and Shoe Warehouse (after 2014).

== Timeline ==
In 2014, DSW, Inc., now known as Designer Brands, acquired a 44% stake in Town Shoes and entered an agreement to open Shoe Warehouse stores in Canada.

In May 2018, DSW purchased the remainder of the company.

On August 28, 2018, DSW announced the end of operations, due to competition from other retailers, and in January 2019, all 38 locations were shut down.

== See also ==
- Browns Shoes
