= American Eagle Outfitters =

American clothing retailer

American Eagle Outfitters, Inc.

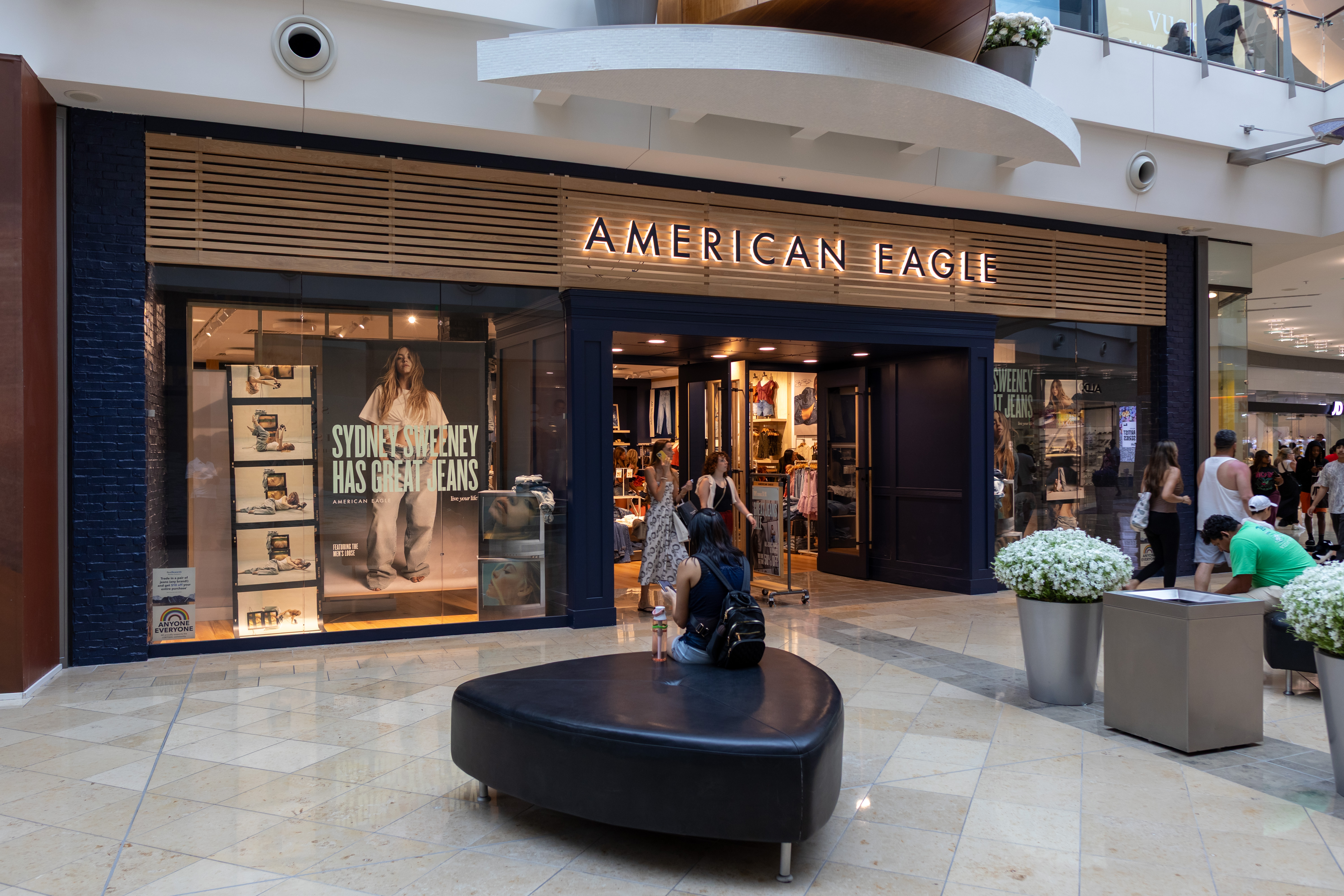
- American Eagle store at The Mall at Millenia in Orlando, Florida
- Trade name: American Eagle
- Type: Public
- Traded as: NYSE: AEO; S&P 600 component
- Industry: Retail
- Founded: 1977; 49 years ago
- Founder: Jerry Silverman; Mark Silverman
- Headquarters: SouthSide Works; 77 Hot Metal Street; Pittsburgh, Pennsylvania, U.S.
- Number of locations: 1,182 stores (Feb. 2024)
- Area served: Worldwide
- Key people: Jay Schottenstein (executive chairman and CEO)
- Products: Apparel, accessories, lingerie, personal care, footwear
- Revenue: ▲US$5.261 billion (2023)
- Operating income: ▼US$222.717 million (2023)
- Net income: ▲US$170.038 million (2023)
- Total assets: ▲US$3.557 billion (2023)
- Total equity: ▲US$1.736 billion (2023)
- Number of employees: 40,000 (Feb. 2024)
- Subsidiaries: Aerie; Todd Snyder; Quiet Logistics
- Website: ae.com

American Eagle Outfitters, Inc. is an American clothing and accessories retailer headquartered at SouthSide Works in the South Side Flats neighborhood of Pittsburgh, Pennsylvania. It was founded in 1977 by brothers Jerry and Mark Silverman as a subsidiary of Retail Ventures, Inc., a company that also owned and operated Silverman's Menswear. The Silvermans sold half their ownership interests in 1980 to the Schottenstein family and the remainder in 1991. American Eagle Outfitters is the parent company of Aerie, Unsubscribed, and Todd Snyder.

American Eagle retails jeans, polo shirts, graphic T-shirts, boxers, outerwear, and swimwear. American Eagle targets male and female university and high school students, although older adults also wear the brand.

In 1977, the first American Eagle Outfitters store opened in Twelve Oaks Mall in Novi, Michigan. As of January 2023, the company operated 1,175 American Eagle stores, 175 Aerie stores, and 12 Todd Snyder stores across the US, Canada, Mexico, and Hong Kong.

== Development ==
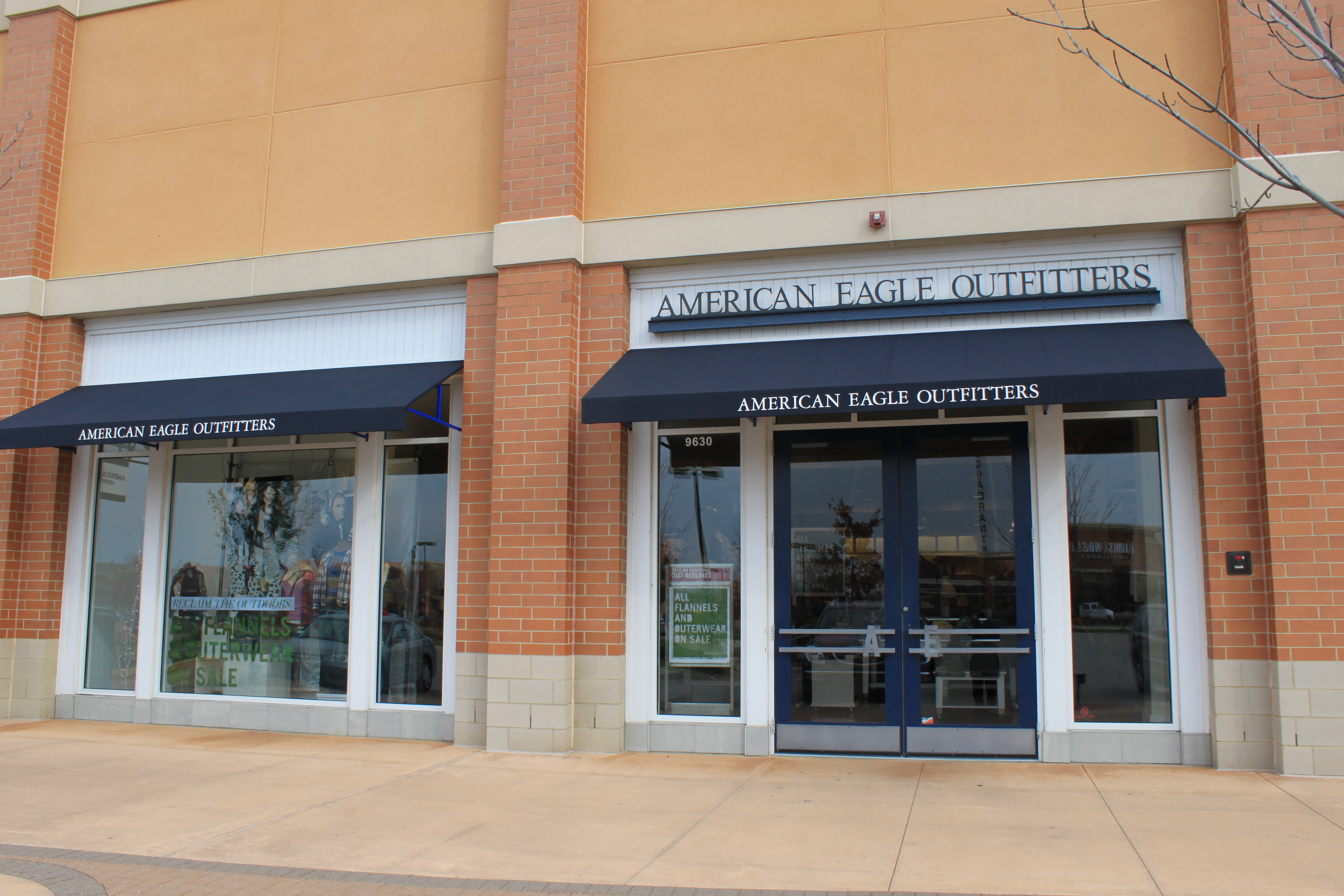
American Eagle Outfitters, Green Oak Village Place

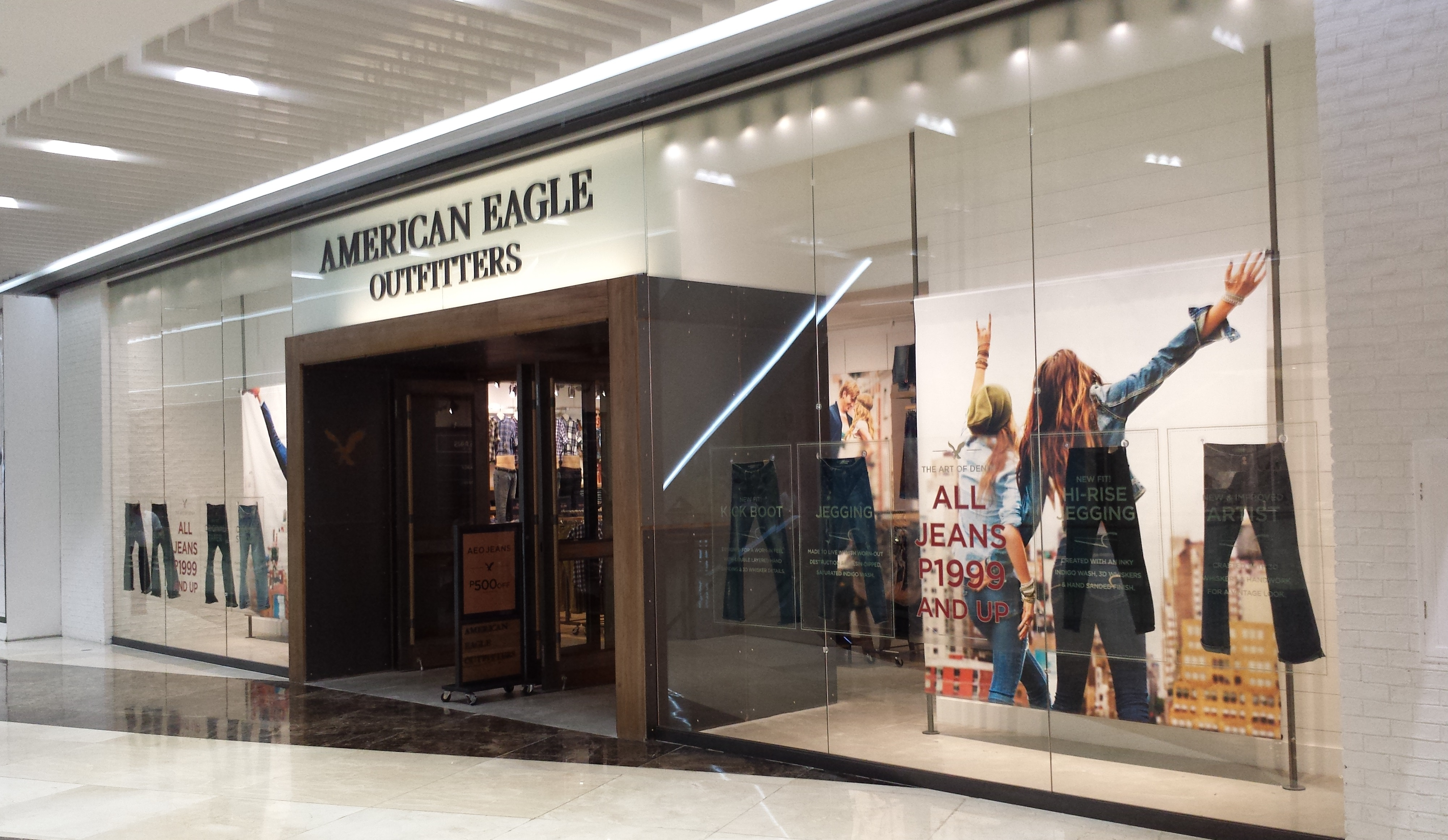
An American Eagle Outfitters store at a mall in Taguig, Philippines

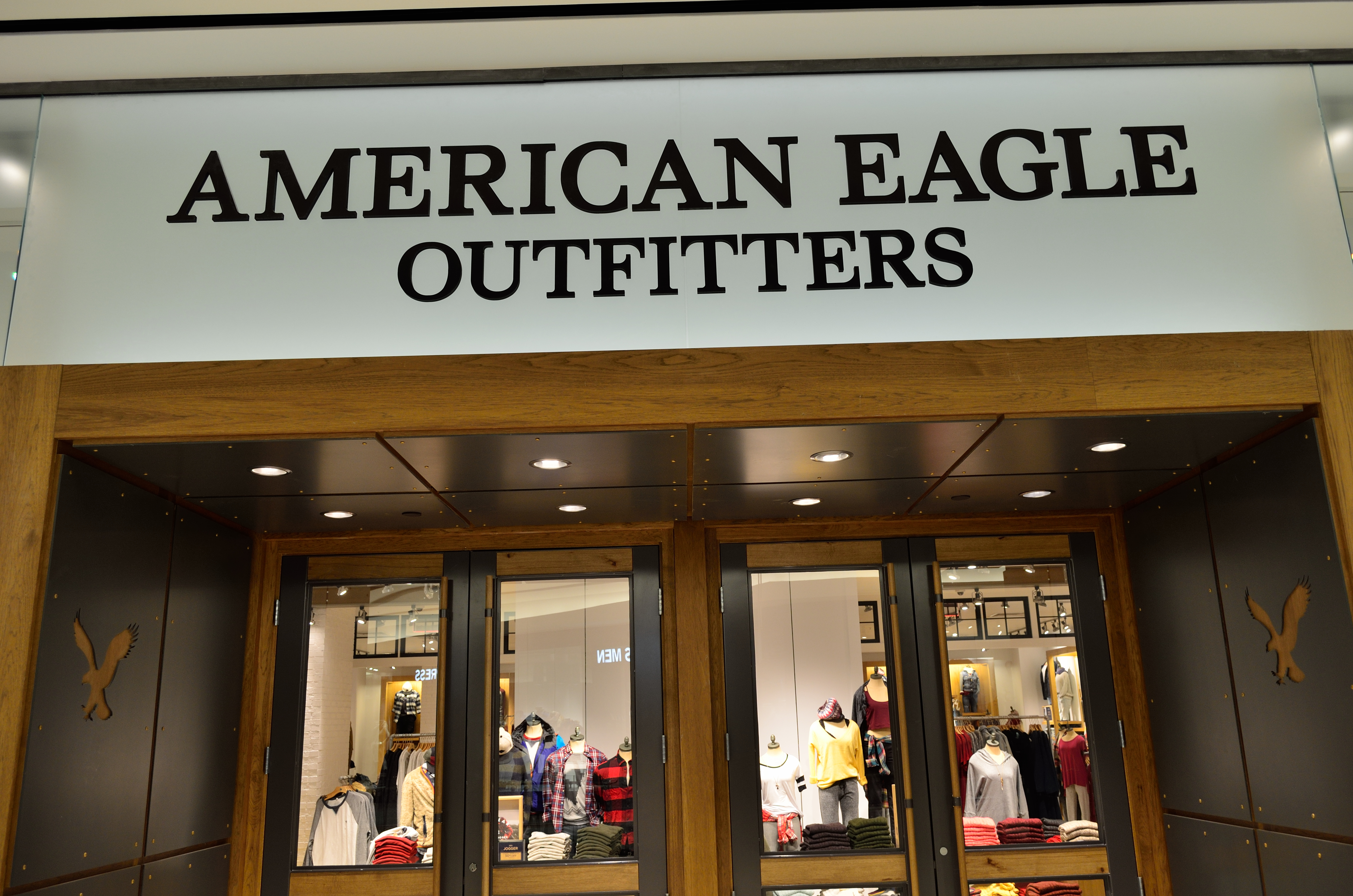
American Eagle Outfitters at a mall in Markham, Ontario, Canada

American Eagle's beginning was with the Silverman family, which owned and operated Silvermans Menswear. By the mid-1970s, two of the Silverman brothers—the third generation of Silvermans in the family business—were running the business. Jerry Silverman was the president and CEO, while his brother, Mark, served as executive vice-president and COO. The Silverman brothers were convinced they needed to diversify their product offerings in order to continue growing their company. They also recognized that the addition of new family-owned chains would then enable them to operate more than one store in the same mall. Their first attempt was to open American Eagle Outfitters in 1977, positioning it as a proprietor of brand-name leisure apparel, footwear, as well as accessories for men and women, emphasizing merchandise suited for outdoor sports, such as hiking, mountain climbing, and camping. Stores were set up in shopping malls and a catalog was established. The chain grew for much of the 1980s. In 1989, the owners decided to refocus their business on American Eagle Outfitters, selling their other retail chains. At the time, there were 137 American Eagle Outfitters stores in 36 different states.

Despite the plans for quick growth after the reorganization, American Eagle Outfitters opened only 16 new stores by 1991 and the company was losing money. At this point, the Schottensteins, who had been 50% owners of the chain since 1980, bought out the Silverman family's interest. This change in leadership resulted in American Eagle finding its present niche: casual clothing for men and women, selling private label clothes.

When the company began trading on the NASDAQ stock exchange in the second quarter of 1994, it had 167 stores and a healthy cash flow. With the cash infusion from the IPO, the company opened more than 90 new stores over the next year. Several new executives joined the company in 1995 and '96, leading to another change in the target demographic. Over the next five years, revenues quintupled to $1 billion by 2000. AEO opened the first Canadian store in 2000.

As of January 30, 2016, the company operated 949 AEO brand stores, and 97 stand-alone and 67 side-by-side Aerie stores in shopping malls, lifestyle centers, and street locations in the U.S., Canada, Mexico, Hong Kong, China, the United Kingdom, and internationally. The company had 21 franchised stores operated by franchise partners in 10 countries. On January 22, 2014, then-CEO Robert Hanson stepped down and Jay Schottenstein became interim CEO.

=== Finances and operations ===
On March 15, 2005, the company adjusted its accounting of rent expenses and construction allowances after the Securities and Exchange Commission noted that a number of companies had been improperly logging these items. Due to "disappointing product execution in the women's category", American Eagle posted only a 3% gain in its 2013 second-quarter profits and the stock price dropped.

=== Products ===
On 27 July 2020, American Eagle Outfitters revealed it would sell a new range of fitness wear called "Offline" by Aerie, targeted at consumers who want apparel that can be used for both their workouts and relaxation.

== Corporate and headquarters ==
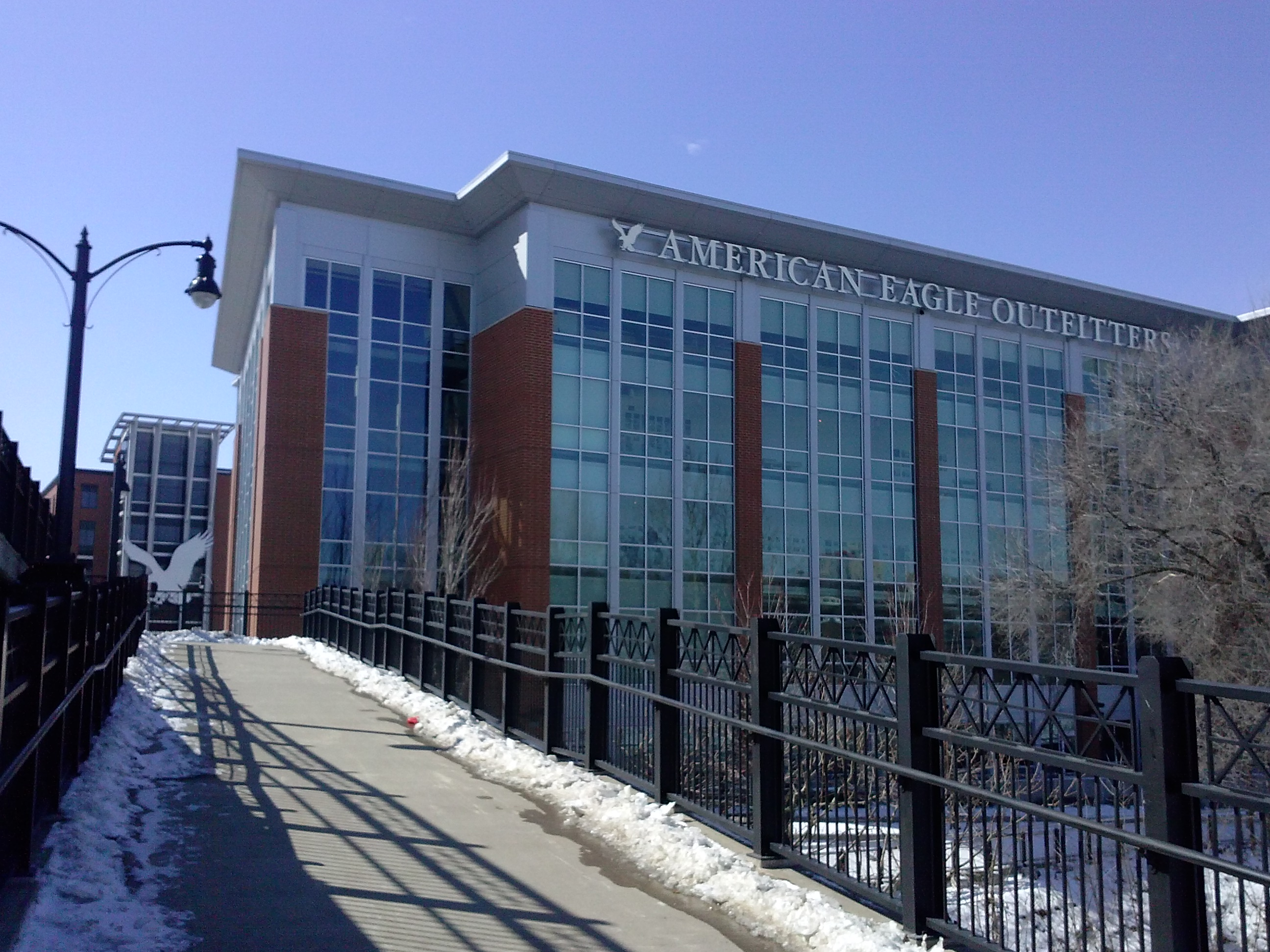
American Eagle's headquarters

In mid-2007, American Eagle moved its headquarters from Warrendale, Pennsylvania, to a more urban location at the SouthSide Works complex in Pittsburgh. The cost of the buildings and adjacent property was approximately $21 million (excluding interior finishing and additional construction costs). The addresses of the buildings are 19 Hot Metal Street and 77 Hot Metal Street, with the numbers symbolizing the first store opening in 1977. The Southside Works Campus includes a private garage, a lab store for each brand, a photo studio, and an in-house cafeteria. Other offices are in New York (design and production).

=== Franchise agreement ===
In June 2009, the company signed the franchise agreement with M. H. Alshaya, one of the leading retailers in the Middle East. The agreement saw the introduction of the first stores outside North America, with the first two opening in Dubai and Kuwait on March 16 and 25, 2010, respectively, and another that opened on October 15, 2011, in Kaslik, Lebanon. Another opened in June 2012 in Hamra Street, Beirut, followed by one in Beirut City Centre, Hazmieh.

=== Logistics ===
The company maintains distribution centers in Hazleton, Pennsylvania; Ottawa, Kansas; and Mississauga, Ontario.

== Stores ==
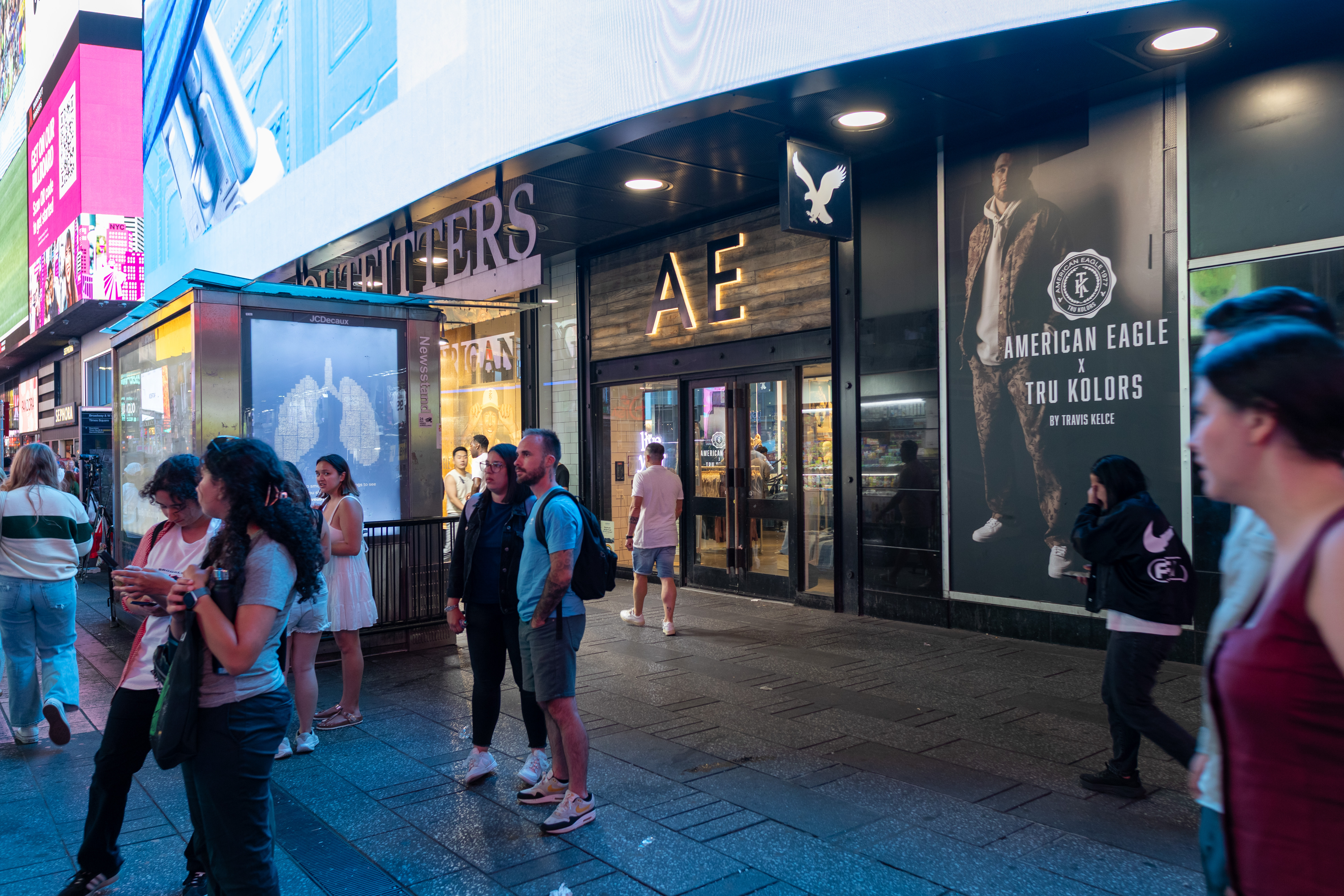
Exterior of an American Eagle Outfitters store in Times Square, New York City

Items are placed on wooden shelving, tables, or clothes racks. The clothes in AEO Factory stores are hung on basic black hangers, and AEO stores have wooden hangers. There is usually a flat-screen television hanging in the back of the store or behind the cash wrap. The floors are typically wood or concrete. The theme and displays change based on seasonal lines and promotions.

== Subsidiaries ==
=== aerie ===
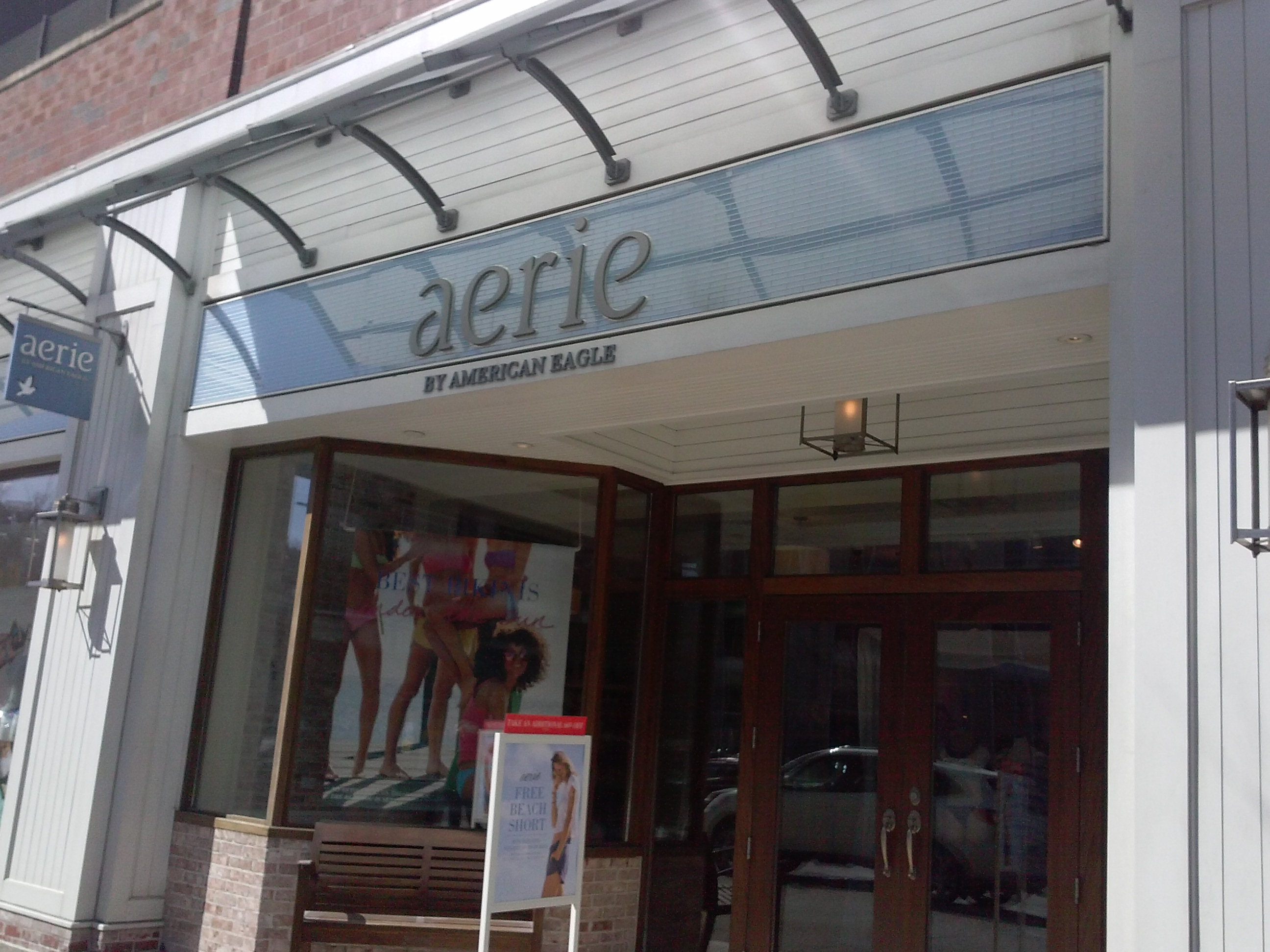
Aerie store in the SouthSide Works area of Pittsburgh

In February 2006, American Eagle launched the aerie lingerie sub-brand, targeting American 15- to 22-year-old females. In addition to lingerie such as bras and other undergarments, the aerie line sells dorm wear, active apparel, loungewear, accessories and sleepwear. What started as a sub-brand quickly became a standalone concept in its own right, featuring a complete fitness line, called aerie f.i.t. The aerie brand is sold in American Eagle Outfitters stores, on the American Eagle website, and in stand-alone aerie retail stores. The first stand-alone aerie store opened in August 2006 in Greenville, South Carolina, and was followed by two more test stores later that year. As of December 2010, there were 147 stand-alone aerie stores in the U.S. and Canada. Aerie has started a campaign that focuses on promoting models' real bodies. This entails their slogan #AerieREAL and adding to their advertisements that models have not been retouched. In this way they take a stand against the use of photo manipulation in media. Iskra Lawrence, while she models for the lingerie line, is also the global role model for the brand.

=== Martin + Osa ===
The company's second stand-alone lifestyle concept launched in 2006 and targeted men and women age 28 to 40. It featured cashmere sweaters and casual clothing for an older target audience. It also sold products by Fred Perry, Ray-Ban, Adidas, Onitsuka Tiger, and HOBO International. In March 2010, management announced that all 28 Martin + Osa stores would be closed, after a failure in retail markets, causing AEO, Inc. to lose up to $44 million.

=== 77kids ===
In October 2008, American Eagle released and launched 77kids, a line of clothing aimed at children aged two to ten. Initially an online only concept, AEO opened its first 77kids store on July 15, 2010, in The Mall at Robinson in Pittsburgh, and eight others followed that year. Expansion continued throughout FY2011. 77kids stores, targeted at younger children, featured interactive games and activities throughout the stores that children could play with while shopping.

American Eagle Outfitters announced on May 15, 2012, that it would sell or close all 22 77kids stores by the end of July 2012. Robert Hanson, who became CEO in January 2012, said 77kids had a loss after taxes of roughly $24 million on sales of $40 million in the 2011 fiscal year. On August 3, 2012, American Eagle Outfitters completed the sale of its 77kids to Ezrani 2 Corp, a company formed by Ezra Dabah, the former chairman and CEO of The Children's Place. Ezrani renamed the store "Ruum" in 2013.

=== Tailgate and Todd Snyder ===
In November 2015, American Eagle Outfitters acquired Todd Snyder's eponymous label, as well as his Tailgate Clothing Company, a brand centered on vintage-style collegiate apparel. American Eagle initially focused on Southeastern Conference and Big Ten colleges, hoping to gain more popularity among its target demographic of teenagers and college students.

=== Bluenotes' ===
After its acquisition of Thiftys from Dylex, the 107 stores were rebranded as Bluenotes' in 2000, then sold off in 2004.

=== Unsubscribed ===
American Eagle Outfitters created a new upmarket brand focused on sustainable quality goods in 2020. Boutiques can be found in prestigious resort neighborhoods.

=== Quiet Logistics ===
American Eagle Outfitters announced a $350 million acquisition of Quiet Logistics on November 2, 2021. The acquisition was completed on December 29, 2021.

== International expansion ==
American Eagle opened its first Canadian store in 2001 after it purchased assets of Dylex. In 2010, AEO opened stores in Kuwait, Riyadh, and Dubai. A store in Kaslik, Lebanon, opened on October 15, 2011. A store in Cairo, Egypt, opened in late 2011. In September 2011, two stores opened in Moscow, Russia. Its first store in Jordan opened in November 2011 in TAJ Lifestyle Center. Its first store in Tokyo, Japan, opened on April 18, 2012. The first store in Tel Aviv, Israel, opened in February 2012, after the Israeli-based clothing retailer FOX signed a contract with AEO, and expanded to Jerusalem. There are also stores in Beijing, Shanghai and Hong Kong. American Eagle Outfitters opened its first store in the Philippines in March 2013.

American Eagle has also opened stores in Mexico. The first opened in Mexico City at Fashion Mall Perisur on February 20, 2013, and at Centro Santa Fe in June. Another opened in Guadalajara later in 2013 at Fashion Mall Galerías Guadalajara. In 2014 the company financed the rescue and renovation of the Jardín Edith Sánchez Ramírez pocket park in Mexico City.

American Eagle expanded to the U.K. in November 2014, opening stores in Westfield London, Westfield Stratford City, and Bluewater. The Westfield London store opened on November 14, 2014, the Westfield Stratford City store on November 17, 2014, and the Bluewater store on November 19, 2014. All UK operations have ceased, with the UK website closed and all UK stores closed by the end of July 2017.

American Eagle Outfitters opened its first store in Muscat, Oman, on October 3, 2015. The company made its debut in the Indian market in June 2018 with first store launched in DLF Mall of India, Noida. Today it operates 17 stores across the country.

AEO entered the Chilean market in September 2015, with the opening of its first store in the Parque Arauco shopping center. After it arrived in the Chilean market, the company's expansion was concentrated in Santiago.

In 2019, American Eagle Outfitters became one of only two major clothing companies with commitments in line with the Paris Agreement's goal of limiting global average temperature increase to 1.5 degrees Celsius.

In 2020, American Eagle Outfitters opened its first store in Prague, Czech Republic, in the factory outlet center Fashion Arena Prague Outlet. In 2023, AEO opened its first store in Uruguay, Punta Carretas Shopping.

== Controversies ==
=== Strike ===
In 2004, the textile and apparel workers union UNITE HERE launched the "American Vulture" back-to-school boycott of American Eagle in protest of alleged workers' rights violations at the company's Canadian distribution contractor National Logistics Services (NLS). On the 2007 second-quarter conference call, CEO James O'Donnell clarified the American Eagle's relationship with NLS and its effect on business. He explained,

We owned NLS with the acquisition of Braemar back in 2000, and we subsequently sold off NLS in 2006, and we are currently a customer of NLS... We have no involvement at all with Unite Here and NLS. Our only involvement with NLS is basically as a customer, and there have been some allegations made, I think, to some of, to the public about it affecting our business. I can tell you right now it has not affected our business.

=== Abercrombie & Fitch lawsuits ===
Since 1999, Abercrombie & Fitch has sued American Eagle Outfitters at least three times for allegedly copying its designs and its advertisements. On all occasions, American Eagle prevailed in court on the grounds that A&F cannot stop it from presenting similar designs since such designs cannot be copyrighted in the United States. Nevertheless, American Eagle clothing designs have since trended away in appearance from Abercrombie & Fitch designs. Judges have generally ruled that giving Abercrombie exclusive rights to market its clothing in a certain way "would be anti-competitive."

=== Sydney Sweeney ad campaign ===
An image from the American Eagle Outfitters "Sydney Sweeney Has Great Jeans" advertisement campaign

On July 23, 2025, American Eagle launched a campaign featuring actress Sydney Sweeney in which she was marketed as having "great jeans", a pun on "great genes". Some outlets compared the advertisement to a 1980 Calvin Klein campaign that featured Brooke Shields. The campaign was designed to improve sales with Generation Z customers amid uncertainty over increased costs due to tariffs, and was reportedly American Eagle's most expensive campaign to date. The company's stock price rose 10% after it was announced.

In the first few days, the majority of social media sentiment towards the campaign was positive and apolitical. However, by the end of July, some social media users had started accusing the campaign of promoting eugenics and white supremacy. The New York Times later reported that negative reactions initially came from a small number of accounts with relatively few followers. They claimed that "the right" then exaggerated that limited backlash, which in turn increased left-leaning criticism. Some online posts compared the campaign to Nazi propaganda, while defenders of the campaign called the backlash an example of wokeness and cancel culture. The media widely reported on the controversy and interviewed commentators and academics, several of whom endorsed the criticism. MSNBC supported the backlash, while Megyn Kelly of Fox News called it a "leftist meltdown". The Atlantic and the Los Angeles Times found the reactions from both sides exaggerated. The Trump administration commented on the affair, with JD Vance stating: "My political advice to the Democrats is, continue to tell everybody who thinks Sydney Sweeney is attractive is a Nazi" and Donald Trump praising "the HOTTEST ad out there." A few hours after Trump's comment, American Eagle's stock price rose about 23%.

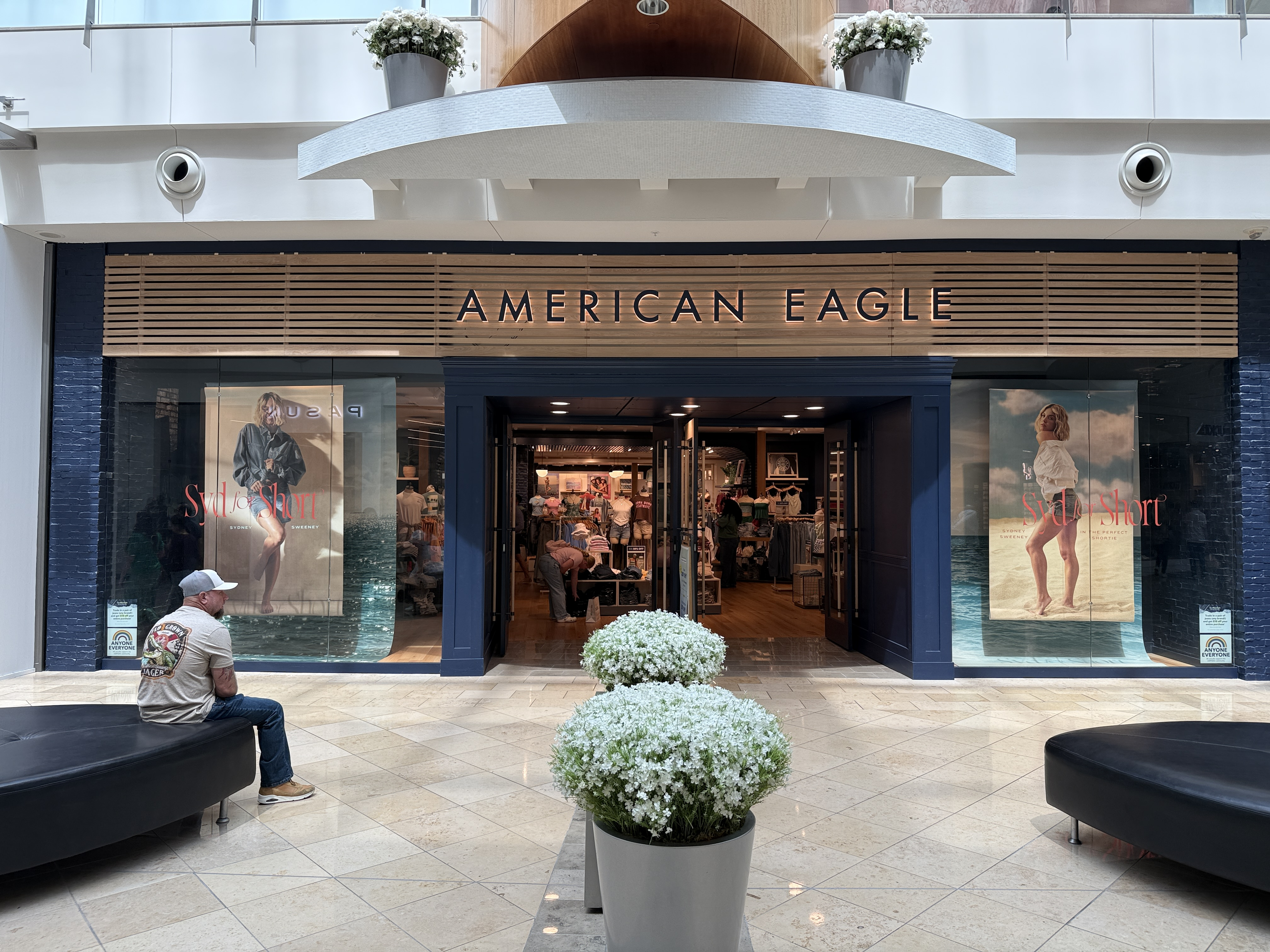
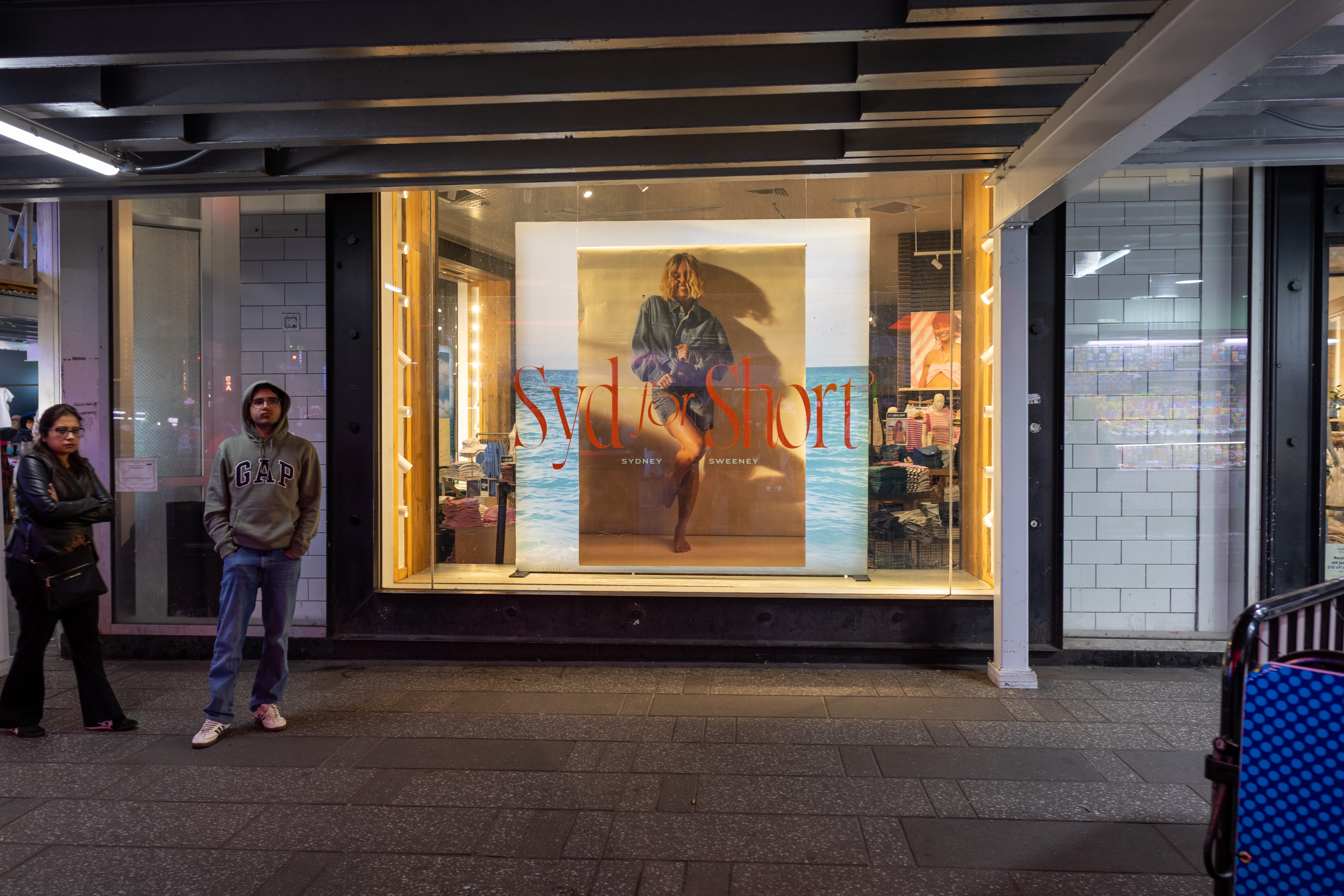
American Eagle Outfitters "Syd for Short" advertisement campaign, displayed in Orlando, Florida, and Times Square, New York City, respectively.

On August 1, American Eagle responded by stating that the ad campaign "is and always was about the jeans." Following the campaign, on August 19, competitor Gap launched a denim campaign titled "Better in Denim", featuring the girl group Katseye, whose members notably come from various ethnic backgrounds and nationalities, performing choreography with various background dancers to Kelis's "Milkshake". Media coverage highlighted the timing and themes of Gap's campaign as a response to American Eagle's advertisement, noting its focus on inclusivity. Within two weeks, the campaign reportedly generated over 8 billion media impressions and 400 million views, and was described as a high-visibility marketing effort that positioned Gap in comparison to American Eagle's campaign.

In September, American Eagle assessed the campaign as "a winner": CMO Craig Brommers said that it had "generated unprecedented new customer acquisition" and CEO Jay Schottenstein credited that campaign, together with another that featured Travis Kelce, for an "uptick in customer awareness, engagement and comparable sales". In November 2025, The Hollywood Reporter said that the "uproar" about the ad campaign had been "one of the year's silliest controversies". Brommers later said that research had shown public opinion was far more favorable to the campaign than online reactions might have suggested, and that "It turns out social media is not the truth". However, he also said that the furor around the campaign had caused his family to receive threats, requiring involvement from the FBI.

The ad campaign was parodied by Katie Couric in a public service announcement that encouraged people to have regular colon cancer screenings. In October 2025, it was referenced in a sketch titled KPop Demon Hunters on the season 51 premiere episode of Saturday Night Live.

On April 15, 2026, American Eagle again teamed up with Sweeney on a second campaign, called "Syd for Short" and advertising their jean shorts. The ad made a reference to Sweeney's previous association with the brand. At the time of the announcement, it was not as controversial as the earlier ad.

== International stores ==
Locations in the U.S., Canada, Mexico, and Hong Kong are operated directly by American Eagle, whereas other locations are operated under license agreements with third parties.

Africa:

- Egypt: 4
- Morocco: 2

Americas:

- United States: 909
- Canada: 103
- Mexico: 40
- Colombia: 14
- Chile: 13
- Ecuador: 3
- Peru: 1
- Costa Rica: 2
- Guatemala: 2
- El Salvador: 1
- Panama: 2
- Curaçao: 1
- Dominican Republic: 1

Asia:

- Israel: 43
- Saudi Arabia: 18
- South Korea: 16
- United Arab Emirates: 14
- India: 17
- Philippines: 10
- Hong Kong: 15
- Thailand: 6
- Lebanon: 5
- China: 4
- Kuwait: 4
- Qatar: 4
- Bahrain: 2
- Jordan: 1
- Oman: 1

Europe:

- Greece: 9
- Netherlands: 4

== See also ==
- List of S&P 400 companies
