= Kaslik =

Maronite town in the Keserwan District of the Mount Lebanon Governorate in Lebanon

Kaslik كسليك
- Town
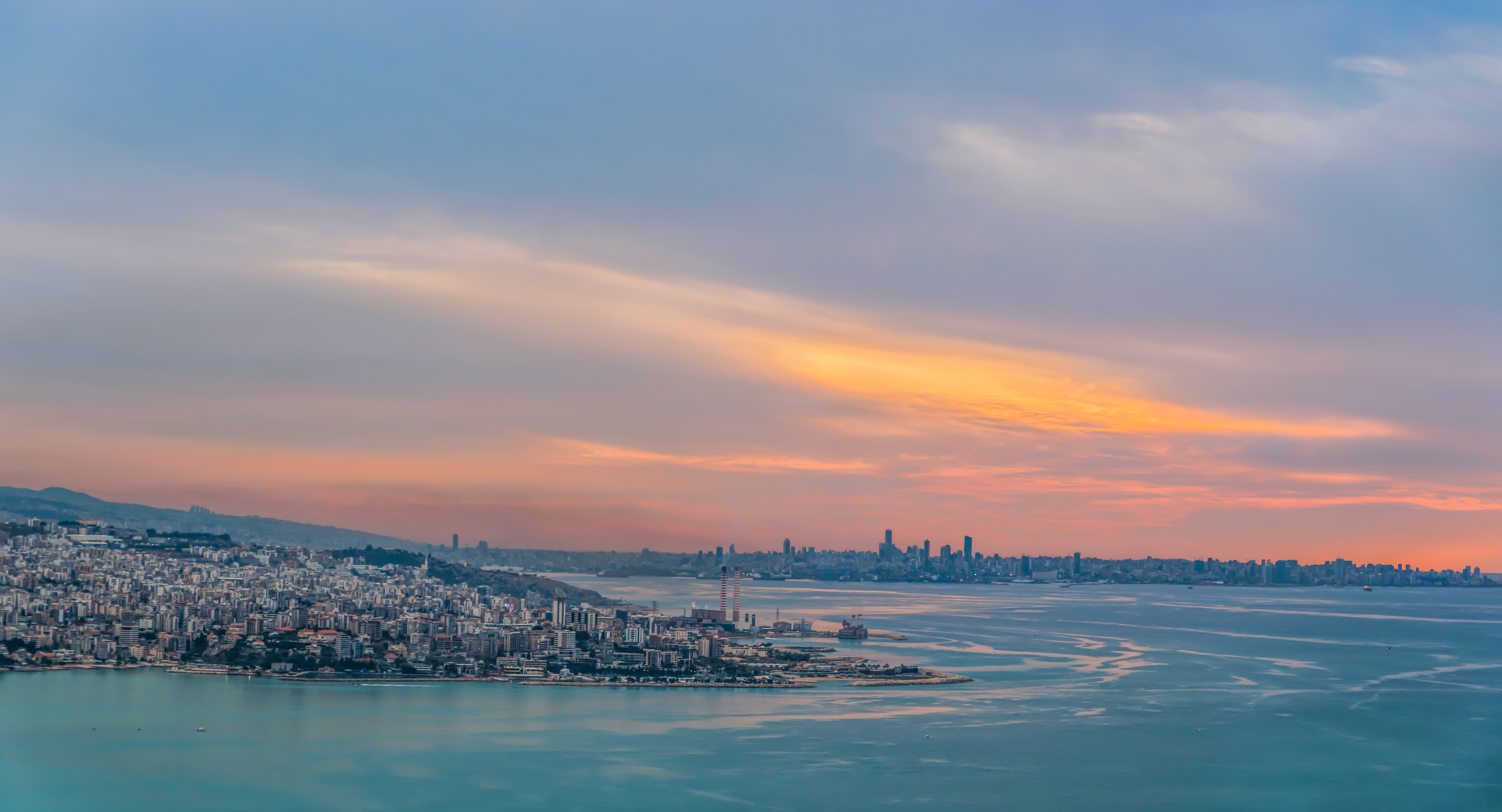
- Jounieh Bay At Sunset 2016

- Location in Lebanon
- Coordinates: 33°58′59″N 35°37′05″E
- Country: Lebanon
- Governorate: Keserwan-Jbeil
- District: Keserwan
- Time zone: UTC+2 (EET)
  - Summer (DST): UTC+3 (EET)

Kaslik (Arabic: كسليك, romanized: Kaslīk) is a town in the Keserwan District of the Keserwan-Jbeil Governorate in Lebanon. The town is home to a variety of 18th-century limestone houses, and a number of historic churches. However, the area was also subject to the rampant development during the Lebanese economic boom of the mid-twentieth century and has become heavily urbanized and now features a variety of factories and industrial plants within its borders. The vast majority of the population is composed by Maronite Christians.

Kaslik is today a hub for fishing and leisure ports as well as resorts, hotels, beaches and a shopping area. The town is also home to the USEK University and to international restaurants and cafes.
