= Jay Schottenstein =

American businessman

- Born: 1954 (age 71–72)
- Education: Indiana University, Bloomington (BS)
- Known for: Chairman and CEO of Schottenstein Stores Corp. Chairman and CEO of American Eagle Outfitters; Chairman and CEO of American Signature; Chairman of Designer Brands
- Spouse: Jeanie Rabe
- Children: 3
- Father: Jerome Schottenstein
- Relatives: Jon P. Diamond (brother-in-law)

Jay Schottenstein (born 1954) is an entrepreneur from Columbus, Ohio. He is the chairman and CEO of Schottenstein Stores Corporation, American Eagle Outfitters, and American Signature, as well as the chairman of Designer Brands, which owns the DSW shoe outlet chain.

== Early life ==
Schottenstein was born and raised in Columbus, Ohio, to a Jewish family, the son of Geraldine (née Hurwitz) and Jerome Schottenstein. His father, uncles, and grandfather established Schottenstein Stores Corporation. Schottenstein graduated from Indiana University Bloomington in 1976.

== Career ==
In 1976, Schottenstein began working in his father's business, joining Value City Furniture.

Schottenstein became chairman of American Eagle Outfitters in 1992 and held the position of CEO from 1992 to 2002, and since December 2015. In 1993, after his father's death, he replaced his father as head of Schottenstein Stores Corporation. Since 2005, he has served as chairman of DSW.

Schottenstein oversees a network of businesses that include American Eagle Outfitters (NYSE:AEO), Designer Brands (NYSE:DBI), American Signature and Value City Furniture, SB360 Capital Partners and Schottenstein Property Group.

== Personal life ==
Jay Schottenstein is married to Jeanie Schottenstein (née Rabe). Schottenstein is a philanthropist and gives to local, national, and international charities.
