= Schottenstein Stores =

American retail holding company

Schottenstein Stores Corporation
- Type: Private
- Industry: Retail; Holding Company
- Headquarters: Columbus, Ohio, United States
- Key people: Jay L. Schottenstein (chairman, CEO)
- Revenue: US$ 3 billion
- Website: www.sbcapitalgroup.com

Schottenstein Stores Corp., based in Columbus, Ohio, is a holding company for various ventures of the Schottenstein family. Jay Schottenstein and his sons Joey Schottenstein, Jonathan Schottenstein, and Jeffrey Schottenstein are the primary holders in the company.

== Retail ventures ==
Schottenstein Stores owns stakes in DSW and American Signature Furniture; 15% of American Eagle Outfitters, retail liquidator SB360 Capital Partners, over 50 shopping centers, and 5 factories producing its shoes and furniture.

It also holds an ownership interest in American Eagle Outfitters, Wehmeyer in Germany, Cold Stone Creamery, The Mazel Company, Gidding-Jenny, Shiffren Willens jewelry stores, and Sara Fredericks boutiques.

Schottenstein had operated the chain of Value City discount department stores.

In 2006, a consortium of investors, including Schottenstein Stores, purchased 655 stores from grocery retailer Albertson's.

== Brands ==
Schottenstein Stores owns the rights to various brands, including Bugle Boy (purchased in 2001), "Cannon", "Royal Velvet", "Charisma", "Fieldcrest", J. Peterman, delia's, SB Premier Brands and Leslie Fay.
