= American Signature =

Furniture company in the United States

American Signature, Inc.
- Type: Subsidiary
- Industry: Retail, Manufacturing
- Founded: 1948; 78 years ago
- Founder: Jerome Schottenstein
- Defunct: 2026
- Fate: Chapter 11 bankruptcy
- Headquarters: Columbus, Ohio, United States
- Number of locations: 120
- Key people: Jay Schottenstein
- Products: Furniture
- Owner: Jay Schottenstein
- Parent: Schottenstein Stores
- Website: americansignaturefurniture.com vcf.com

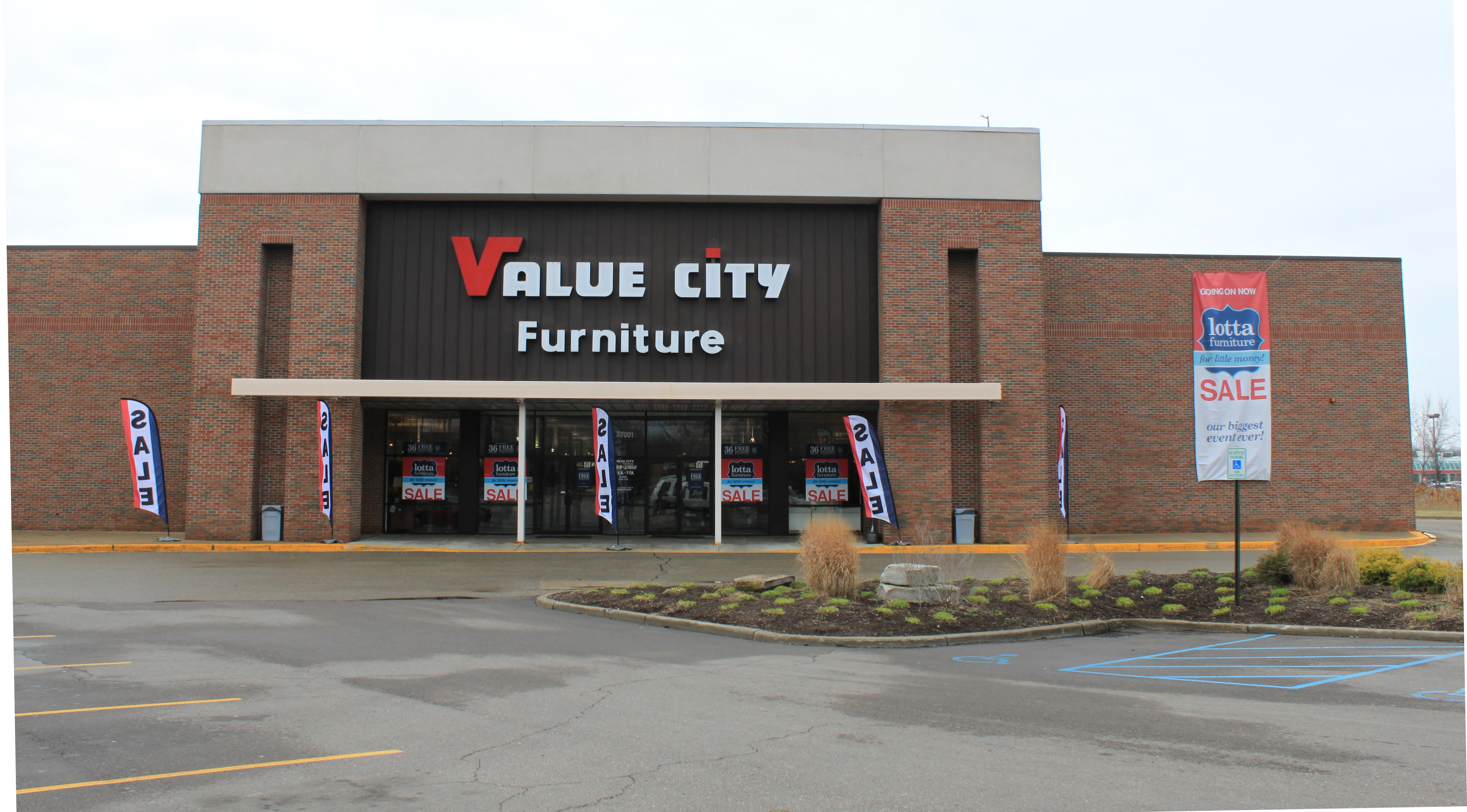
Value City Furniture store, Westland, Michigan

American Signature, Inc. was a privately owned furniture company based in Columbus, Ohio. It is the parent company of the retail brands American Signature Furniture and Value City Furniture, and the manufacturer brand American Signature.

American Signature Furniture and Value City Furniture sell residential furniture manufactured by American Signature, Inc., as well as more than 30 additional manufacturers from 125 locations around the East Coast, Midwest, and Southeastern United States.

== History ==
Clothing store entrepreneur E.L. Schottenstein adapted his successful apparel store to sell furniture in the early 1900s after the post-World War II baby boom accelerated demand for furniture. Recognizing the expanding opportunity, Schottenstein created a separate business dedicated to furniture sales, later renaming it Value City Furniture.

=== Alvin Schottenstein and Value City Furniture ===
In 1948, E.L. Schottenstein’s son, Alvin, took over the furniture portion of the family company and Value City Furniture.

=== Jay Schottenstein and American Signature, Inc. ===
In 1976, Jay Schottenstein joined Value City Furniture and in 1984, he was named company president. In 1995, the proprietary furniture brand American Signature was formed. This line was sold in Value City Furniture stores.

With the addition of the proprietary American Signature brand, and the overall expansion of Value City Furniture, Jay knew it was time to completely break away from the department stores. In 2002, American Signature, Inc. was formed, and eventually the company completely separated from Schottenstein Stores Corporation.

American Signature, Inc. became the parent company of the retail brand Value City Furniture and the manufacturer brand, American Signature. In 2003, the company announced the launch of the American Signature Furniture retail brand, with their first store opening in Nashville, Tennessee.

Until its bankruptcy in late 2025, American Signature, Inc. continued to own and operate 87 stores across 18 U.S. states through their American Signature Furniture and Value City Furniture banners, offering living, dining, and bedroom furniture, various home furnishings, and outdoor patio pieces.

=== Bankruptcy and liquidation ===
In November 2025, American Signature filed for Chapter 11 bankruptcy protection as part of a plan to sell its assets via a stalking horse bid within 45 days. The company currently plans to continue operating throughout the procedure, but plans to close a certain number of stores throughout its namesake and Value City Furniture brands, including all of its stores in the Nashville and metro Atlanta markets.

On January 9, 2026, after no bids were made against American Signature, the company announced the closure of all of its remaining locations under its two brands nationwide. A bankruptcy judge approved SB360 Capital Partners, Hilco Global and Gordon Brothers to conduct liquidation sales, which concluded by March 2026.
