= List of Canadian stores =

This is a list of Canadian stores, grouped by type.

== Alcohol and cannabis stores ==
=== Cannabis ===
- BC Cannabis Stores

=== Alcohol ===
All Co-op liquor stores in Federated Co-op group

- LCBO
- The Beer Store
- SAQ
- BC Liquor Stores
- Manitoba Liquor Mart
- Real Canadian Liquorstore
- NSLC

== Apparel and jewelry stores ==
=== Clothing stores ===
- Women's Clothing
  - Ardene
  - Aritzia
  - La Vie en Rose
  - Le Château
  - Penningtons
  - Reitmans
  - La Senza
  - Fairweather
- Unisex Clothing
  - Mark's
  - H&M Canada — Canadian division of Swedish-based H&M
  - Joe Fresh
  - Bluenotes
  - Roots Canada
  - Lululemon
  - Kit and Ace
  - RW&CO
  - Urban Planet
  - Dynamite Clothing
- Men's Clothing
  - Harry Rosen
  - Tip Top
  - Moores
  - JD Sports Canada — Canadian division of UK-based JD Sports

Defunct clothing stores

- Bi-Way — discount clothing store chain
- Nygård — apparel manufacturer and retailer
- Alia N TanJay – apparel retailer owned by Nygård International
- Addition Elle — Plus-sized clothing store
- Justice Canada — Children's clothing store

=== Shoe stores ===
- Aldo
- The Shoe Company
- Clarks Shoes Canada — Canadian division of UK-based Clarks Shoes
- Browns Shoes

Defunct shoe stores:

- Payless Canada – Canadian division of US-based Payless

=== Jewelry stores ===
- Ben Moss Jewellers
- Charm Diamond Centres
- Signet Jewelers
- MIchael Hill Jeweller Canada, Canadian division of Australian-based Michael Hill Jeweller

== Gift and bath stores ==
- The Body Shop Canada — used to be a Canadian division of UK-based The Body Shop before it got acquired by The Serruya Group in 2024.

== Book stores ==
- Arbeiter Ring Publishing
- Attic Books in London, Ontario
- Bakka-Phoenix in Toronto
- Bison Books in Winnipeg, Manitoba
- Book City in Toronto
- Camas Bookstore and Infoshop in Victoria, British Columbia
- Glad Day Bookshop in Toronto
- Indigo Books and Music, Canada's largest bookstore chain, based in Toronto
  - Coles
  - Chapters
- Little Sister's Book and Art Emporium in Vancouver, British Columbia
- McNally Robinson, small independently run chain of stores across Canada
- The Monkey's Paw in Toronto
- Munro's Books in Victoria
- Spartacus Books in Vancouver
- The Word Bookstore in Montreal
- Renaud-Bray the largest chain of French-language bookstores in North America, and the second largest bookstore chain in Canada, after Chapters/Indigo.

Defunct book stores:

- Aqua Books — former independent bookstore in Winnipeg, Manitoba
- The Book Room — in Halifax, Nova Scotia. At the time of its closing in 2008, it was the oldest bookstore in Canada.
- Highway Book Shop — near Cobalt, Ontario
- Hyman's Book and Art Shoppe — an independent Jewish bookstore in Toronto, Ontario
- Mondragon Bookstore & Coffeehouse — former political bookstore and vegan café in Winnipeg
- This Ain't the Rosedale Library — in Toronto
- Toronto Women's Bookstore — in Toronto

== Convenience stores ==
- Couche-Tard
- Becker's
- Circle K
  - replaced the now-defunct Mac's Convenience Stores
- Dollarama
- Gateway Newstands
- Needs Convenience
- On the Run
- Pioneer Energy
- Provi-Soir
- Quickie Convenience Stores
- Great Canadian Dollar Store
- Red River Co-op
- Shell Canada — Canadian division of UK-based Shell

Defunct convenience stores:

- Mac's Convenience Stores
- BP Canada

== Department stores ==
- The Bargain! Shop — Swapping to Red Apple Stores
- Canadian Tire
- Holt Renfrew
- Hart Stores
- La Maison Simons
- Giant Tiger
- Red Apple Stores
- Fields
- Zellers — Revived by Les Ailes de la Mode after Hudson's Bay bankruptcy

Defunct department stores:

- Big Lots! Canada
- Buy Buy Baby Canada — Canadian division of US-based department store chain Buy Buy Baby
- Bed Bath & Beyond Canada — Canadian division of US-based department store chain Bed Bath & Beyond
- Consumers Distributing — catalogue store chain
- Eaton's
- Horizon
- Hudson's Bay — owned by American group, NRDC Equity Partners
- Kmart Canada — Canadian division of US-based parent; Canadian stores sold to Zellers
- Les Ailes de la Mode
- LW Stores
- Metropolitan Stores — variety store chain
- Miracle Mart
- Morgan's
- Nordstrom Canada — Canadian division of US-based department store chain Nordstrom
- Nordstrom Rack Canada — Canadian division of US-based department store chain Nordstrom Rack
- SAAN Stores — discount department store chain
- Shop-Rite — catalogue store chain
- Sears Canada — Canadian division of US-based department store chain Sears
- Simpson's
- Sam's Club Canada
- Stedmans - Division of Macleod-Stedmans Inc.
- Target Canada
- Towers
- Wise Stores
- Woodward's
- Woolworth Canada — Canadian unit of the F. W. Woolworth Company
- Woolco Canada — Canadian unit of US-based department store chain

== Electronics and entertainment stores ==
- Henry's
- Japan Camera
- Jump+ — Canadian Apple reseller
- Samsung Experience Store Canada — Canadian division of Korean-based Samsung Experience Store
- Sunrise Records
- Freedom Mobile
  - Shaw Mobile
  - Videotron Mobile
- Telus
  - Koodo
- Rogers
  - Fido
  - WirelessWave
  - Rogers Wireless
  - Chatr Mobile
- Bell Canada
  - The Source
  - Virgin Plus
  - Lucky Mobile

Defunct electronics and entertainment stores:

- A&B Sound
- Adventure Electronics
- Blockbuster Video — Canadian unit of US-based video rental shop chain
- Future Shop — electronics retailer
- Jumbo Video — video rental shop chain
- Krazy Krazy
- Tower Records — Canadian division of US-based music and entertainment store chain
- The Source - Closed all locations with some rebranding as "Best Buy Express"

== Furniture and home décor stores ==
- Babies "R" Us Canada
- Hart Stores
- Sleep Country Canada
- Leon's
  - The Brick
  - The Brick Mattress Store
- Structube
- Surplus
- JYSK Canada — Canadian division of Danish-based JYSK

Defunct furniture and home décor stores:

- Bed Bath & Beyond Canada
- Buy Buy Baby Canada
- J. Pascal's Hardware and Furniture
- United Furniture Warehouse
- XS Cargo
- Lastman's Bad Boy

== Pet stores ==
- Homes Alive Pets
- Pet Valu
- Ren's Pets

== Grocery and food stores ==
- Bulk Barn
- Co-op brands of Federated Co-operatives Ltd.
- COBS Bread Canada — Canadian division of Australian-based Bakers Delight
- Laura Secord Chocolates
- Loblaws Companies
  - Dominion
  - Fortinos
  - Loblaws
  - Maxi
  - Extra Foods
  - Freshmart
  - No Frills
  - Provigo
  - Real Atlantic Superstore
  - Real Canadian Superstore
  - SaveEasy
  - Shoppers Drug Mart
  - SuperValu
  - T & T Supermarket
  - Valu-mart
  - Your Independent Grocer
  - Zehrs Markets
- Metro
  - Food Basics
  - Super C
  - Adonis / Marché Adonis
  - Metro Plus
- Pattison Food Group
  - Choices Markets
  - PriceSmart Foods
  - Save-On-Foods
  - Urban Fare
- Sobeys
  - Farm Boy
  - Foodland
  - FreshCo
  - IGA
  - Longo's
  - Pete's Fine Foods (formerly Pete's Frootique)
  - Safeway
  - Thrifty Foods
- Well.ca

Defunct grocery & food stores

- A&P - Canadian unit of US-based grocery store chain
- Dominion - defunct as a national chain, operates only in Newfoundland
- Food City
- Knob Hill Farms
- Loeb
- Miracle Food Mart
- Supercentre
- Steinberg's

== Home improvement and automotive ==
All Co-op home and garden centre's in Federated Co-op group

- BMR Group
- Canadian Tire
- Home Hardware
- PartSource
- Peavey Mart out-of-business announced 01/27/25
- Princess Auto
- Red River Co-op

Defunct home improvement and automotive:

- Aikenhead's Hardware
- Beaver Lumber
- Dempsey Store
- Eagle Hardware & Garden
- J. Pascal's Hardware and Furniture
- Pascal
- TSC Stores — Swapped into Peavey Mart

== Pharmaceutical stores ==
- All Co-op pharmacies attached to Federated coop stores
- Brunet
- Familiprix
- Jean Coutu Group
- Lawtons
- London Drugs
- PharmaChoice
- Pharmasave
- Proxim
- Shoppers Drug Mart / Pharmaprix
- Rexall
- Uniprix
- Value Drug Mart

Defunct pharmaceutical stores:

- Cadieux
- Cumberland Drugs
- Tamblyn Drugs

== Sport and recreation stores ==
- FGL Sports, including
  - Atmosphere
  - Sports Experts
  - Sport Chek
- Sporting Life
- Sports Experts
- Tuxedo Source for Sports
- Golf Town

Defunct sports and recreation stores:

- Wholesale Sports

== Toy stores ==
- Mastermind Toys
- Toys “R” Us Canada — Independent since 2018 - formerly, the Canadian division of the US-based Toys "R" Us
- Well.ca

Defunct toy stores:

- Tops 'N' Toys
- Toy City — toy chain owned by Consumers Distributing
- The Disney Store Canada — Moved to online operations

== List of defunct stores ==
This is a list of Canadian retail stores that have gone out of existence due to either bankruptcy, a merger or takeover where their name is no longer in use.

- A&B Sound
- ALIA N Tan Jay — Clothing store owned by Nygård
- Big Lots! Canada — Department store
- A&P — Canadian unit of US-based grocery store chain
- Adventure Electronics
- Aikenhead's Hardware — hardware store
- Aqua Books — former independent bookstore
- Addition Elle — Plus sized clothing store
- Beaver Lumber — hardware/lumber store chain
- BP Canada — Convenience store
- Bi-Way — discount clothing store chain
- Blockbuster Video — Canadian unit of US-based video rental shop chain
- The Book Room — At the time of its closing in 2008, it was the oldest bookstore in Canada.
- Bed Bath &- Beyond Canada — Bath & furniture store
- Buy Buy Baby Canada — Baby store
- Consumers Distributing — catalogue store chain
- Dempsey Store — home improvement stores
- Dominion — grocery store chain, except Newfoundland
- Eagle Hardware & Garden — hardware store
- Eaton's — department store chain
- Food City — grocery store
- Future Shop — electronics retailer
- Highway Book Shop — near Cobalt, Ontario
- Horizon — department stores (possibly owned by Eaton's)
- Hyman's Book and Art Shoppe — an independent Jewish bookstore in Toronto
- J. Pascal's Hardware and Furniture
- Jumbo Video — video rental shop chain
- Justice Canada — Children's clothing
- Payless ShoeSource Canada — Shoe store
- Kmart Canada — Canadian division of US-based parent; Canadian stores sold to Zellers
- Knob Hill Farms — grocery store chain in Southern Ontario
- Krazy Krazy
- Les Ailes de la Mode — department store
- Lowe's Canada — Hardware store, now RONA+
- Lastman's Bad Boy — Furniture Store
- Metropolitan Stores — variety store chain
- Miracle Food Mart — grocery store chain
- Miracle Mart — department store
- Mondragon Bookstore & Coffeehouse — former political bookstore and vegan café in Winnipeg
- Morgan's — department store
- Nygård International — apparel manufacturer and retailer
- Pascal — hardware/furniture store chain
- Nordstrom Canada — Department store
- Nordstrom Rack Canada — Department store
- SAAN Stores — discount department store chain
- Shop-Rite — catalogue store chain
- Sears Canada — Canadian division of US-based department store chain Sears
- Simpson's — department store chain
- Sam's Club Canada — Canadian division of US-based department store chain
- Stedmans - Division of Macleod-Stedmans Inc.
- Steinberg's — grocery store chain
- Supercentre — grocery store chain
- Tamblyn Drugs — pharmacy chain
- Target Canada — department store
- The Disney Store Canada — Toy store
- This Ain't the Rosedale Library
- Tops 'N' Toys
- Toronto Women's Bookstore
- Toy City — toy chain owned by Consumers Distributing
- Towers — department store chain
- Tower Records — Canadian division of US-based music and entertainment store chain
- The Source — electronic store
- Wise Stores — department store
- Wholesale Sports
- Woodward's — department store chain
- Woolworth Canada — Canadian unit of the F. W. Woolworth Company
- Woolco Canada — Canadian unit of US-based department store chain
- XS Cargo — resold bankrupt/excess stock

== See also ==
- List of superstores
- Supermarkets in Canada
