= List of Canadian retail closures (21st century) =

Throughout the 21st century, retail businesses in Canada have felt the pressures of foreign store expansions into the country, as well as a shift towards online retail. As a result, closures have been a mix of stores unique to the nation, as well as newcomers like Target Canada.

== List of retailers ==
Name	Type	Date announced	Locations affected	Situation	Sources
Addition Elle	clothing	June 2020	77	Part of a larger restructuring of its owner, Reitmans. The company owns another plus-size retailer, Penningtons.	
Agnew-Surpass	shoes	August 2000	223	Bankruptcy	
Best Buy	Electronics and Home Appliances	January 31, 2013	7		
Bath & Body Works	bath	May 2020	1	Described as "rightsizing", it was part of a larger closure by L Brands.	
Bentley Leathers	accessories	December 2019	90		
Bose	audio	January 2020	3		
The Bombay Company	home	January 2019	-	Insolvency of owner Fluid Brands Inc	
Bowring	home	January 2019	-	Insolvency of owner Fluid Brands Inc	
Bryan's	clothing	2009	27	Fell victim to the Great Recession	
Claire's	accessories	February 2009	9		
DavidsTea	food	July 2020	82	COVID-19 impacts.	
Future Shop	electronics	January 2013	8		
Future Shop	electronics	2014–2015	8+	Including Boucherville, Greenfield Park, Montreal, Ottawa, Regina, Kingston, New Minas, and New Glasgow.	
Future Shop	electronics	March 2015	66	The other 65 locations were rebranded as Best Buy.	
GameStop Canada	gaming	2020–2021	2		
Gymboree	kids' clothing	January 2019	49		
HMV	music	2017	97	Debt and declining sales. Sunrise Records purchased 70 of the leases, reopening the stores under their own brand.	
Holt Renfrew	department	August 2014	3	Locations in Ottawa, Quebec City, and Winnipeg	
Holt Renfrew	department	May 2019	1	Retailer had a downtown Edmonton store since 1950.	
Hudson's Bay Company	department	May 2020/ June 2025	1/ 96	Closure of a 207-year-old location/ Closure of remaining 96 stores due to Bankruptcy (1B$ in debt).	
Lowe's Canada	department	December 2023	-		
Jean Machine	clothing	November 2018	24	Remaining stores.	
Mariposa	clothing	September 2008		Bankruptcy due to the 2008 financial crisis	
Nando's	restaurant	May 2020	21	After closures, the chain had 27 locations open across Canada.	
Nordstrom	department	March 2023	6		
Pier 1 Imports	Home goods	February 2020	67	Bankruptcy	
Sears Canada	department	June 2017	59		
Sears Canada	department	October 2017	74		
Sears Home	home	October 2017	8		
Sears Hometown	department	October 2017	49		
Staples	Office supplies and Electronics	2014	15	move to online sales	
Stokes	Home goods	February 2020	40	Bankruptcy	
Thyme Maternity	clothing	June 2020	54	Part of a larger restructuring of its owner, Reitmans.	
Town Shoes	shoes	August 2018	38	Citing competition.	
Victoria's Secret	lingerie	May 2020	13	Rightsizing	
Williams Sonoma	kitchen	November 2019	2	Both locations in Montreal.	
Walmart	Department	2021	3 in ON, 2 in AB, 1 in NL	due to low sales	
Zellers	liquidation	2011–2013	189	Target acquires the leases of 189 Zellers stores, most of which it would convert into their own stores. Zellers would continue as a chain in 64 smaller communities.	
Zellers	liquidation	2012	64	HBC announces that it would not continue the Zellers brand in smaller communities.	
Zellers	liquidation	2020	2	The final locations served as liquidation stores for Hudson's Bay.	

The final two Overwaitea Foods stores were closed in 2018; these locations reopened as Save-On-Foods.
