= Reinman =

Reinman is a surname. Notable people with the surname include:

- Paul Reinman (1910–1988), American comic book artist
- Yosef Reinman (born 1947), American Orthodox rabbi, writer, historian, and scholar

== See also ==
- Reinmann
- Reinmar
- Reitman
