= Reitman =

Reitman (alternate spelling Reitmann) is a surname. Notable people with the surname include:

- Ben Reitman (1879–1943), American physician
- Bob Reitman (born 1941), American radio personality
- Catherine Reitman (born 1981), Canadian-American actress
- Dorothy Reitman (born 1932), Canadian community volunteer
- Greg Reitman (born 1971), American film producer
- Herman Reitman (1870–1941), Romanian-Canadian businessman
- Ivan Reitman (1946–2022), Czechoslovak-born Canadian film and television director, producer and screenwriter
- Janet Reitman, American journalist
- Jason Reitman (born 1977), Canadian-American movie director and writer, son of Ivan Reitman
- Jerry Reitman (born 1938), American author, businessman and advertising executive
- Joseph D. Reitman (born 1968), American actor
- Sarah Reitman (1881–1950), Romanian-Canadian businesswoman; wife of Herman
- Francis Reitmann (1905–1955), British psychiatrist

== See also ==
- Reitmans, a Canadian retailing company
- Reitman v. Mulkey
- Martín Rejtman
