= Frontier Mine =

Frontier Mine may refer to:

- Frontier Mine, Katanga, a major copper mine in the Democratic Republic of the Congo
- Keeley-Frontier Mine, a large abandoned mine in the ghost town of Silver Centre, Ontario, Canada
- Teck Frontier Mine, a proposed oilsands mine near Wood Buffalo National Park in Alberta, Canada
