= Penningtons =

Canadian fashion retail store

- Industry: Retail
- Headquarters: Toronto, Ontario, Canada
- Area served: Canada
- Products: Clothing
- Website: penningtons.com

Penningtons is a Canadian fashion retail store that specializes in plus-size women's clothing, with locations across Canada in all ten provinces.

Penningtons is part of the Reitmans Limited Company, also affiliated with RW&CO, Reitmans, and Addition Elle. Their 135 stores sell denim, lingerie, sportswear, activewear, and seasonal wear.

== History ==
Pennington's is a banner which is owned by Reitman's Limited Canada. Reitman's was founded in 1926 by Herman and Sarah Reitman in Montreal, Canada. Since then they have grown the business with the help of 3 generations; their children, grandchildren and great grandchildren which have carried the business throughout the years. Since 1926 Reitman's has been affiliated and helped manage 4 other clothing stores. These stores are RW&CO, Addition Elle, Thyme Maternity and Hyba and Pennington's. The company is now under the control of brothers, Jeremy and Stephen Reitman.

== Company information ==
The company is organized so that Reitman's Ltd is at the top and each banner is below. Jeremy and Stephen Reitman are both chief executive officers. In addition to being chief executive officers, Stephen is also the president and Jeremy is a chairman. Under them are 9 directors: Bruce J. Guerriero, David J. Kassie, Samuel Minzberg, Daniel Rabinowicz, Jeremy H. Reitman, Stephen F. Reitman, Howard Stotland, Robert S. Vineberg, Terry Yanofsky.

Under the directors for Reitman's Ltd are the corporate leaders. They include Jeremy H. Reitman (chairman and chief executive officer), Stephen F. Reitman (president and chief operating officer), Richard Wait, Cpa, Cga (vice-president, finance and chief financial officer), Diane Archibald (vice-president store design and development), Aldo Battista, Mba, Cpa, Ca (vice-president comptroller), Julie Blanchet (vice-president, talent management), Leta Bridgeman (vice-president global sourcing), Domenic Carbone (vice-president distribution and logistics), Nicolas Gaudreau (chief marketing officer), Randi Haimovitz (vice-president, Hr business partnerships), Alain Murad (vice-president - legal & secretary), Lynda Newcomb (chief human resources officer), Rob Nemett (vice-president, retail systems), Allen F. Rubin (vice-president operations), Saul Schipper (vice-president real estate), Elara Verret (vice president digital strategy & global e-commerce)

Below Reitman's Ltd comes Pennington's and Addition Elle who share the same executive team. Their head office includes Rosalba Iannuzzi (vice-president – merchandising), Nagham Yassawi (vice-president - planning and allocation), Ann Wigglesworth-Matyi (vice-president, sales & operations), Carmie Foglia (vice-president marketing & visual presentation for Addition Elle /Pennington), Maria Bligouras (vice-president - planning & allocation), Marie-Soleil Calvert (vice-president – merchandising), Ann Wigglesworth-Matyi (vice-president, sales & operations)

Reitman's Ltd was founded in Montreal and therefore is both a French and English company that caters to all Canadians.

== Products ==
Pennington's is a Canadian clothing store that carries women's clothing from size X to 6X. This translates to be a size 14 to size 32. They carry regular, petite and tall lengths in their pants but not in their tops. The inseams for the different lengths are, for petite 3-4 inches shorter than a regular inseam and for tall size pants the legs are 1-2 inches taller than the regular size pants. Note that a regular size is made to fit women that are 5’4 to 5’7 in height.

For tops they carry a wide range of casual to business casual and lounge type styles. Their t-shirts, both long and short sleeve have three types of neck lines. These include a round/scoop neck, a V-neck and a turtle neck; however the V-neck style is only available in the fall and winter seasons. They carry both a thin and thick strap type of tank which can be worn by themselves or under another top. They also carry sweaters both knit and more of a cotton type material which can come pullover, button down and/or cardigan styles. These are also more in stock in the fall and winter.

Pennington's carries a wide variety of bottoms for plus sized women. These include jeans, dress pants, shorts, skorts, skirts, capris and leggings. The only bottoms that come in a variety of leg lengths (petite and tall) are jeans and dress pants.

Pennington's has a section dedicated to active wear for plus sized women. In this collection it includes yoga pants, leggings, a relax fix pant, sweaters, t-shirts and outerwear.

Other clothing products that they have are pajamas and sleepwear. This includes slippers, night gowns, tops, pants, shorts, house coats and more.

In the section for lingerie many types of products can be found, bras which range from size 38B to 52H and are in many different styles.

Pennington's carries shoes as well; from sneakers to flats to sandals, boots and booties. With the shoes they also carry socks in different shapes and sizes. Sizes range from 6-11 and all shoes are either wide or double wide in width. Half sizes are also available in select styles.

Accessories that they carry include jewelry such as necklaces, rings, earrings and bracelets, hair ties, belts, tights, stockings, sunglasses, blue light glasses, mittens/gloves hats, scarves and watches.

== Customer Program ==
Pennington's has a customer program which tracks purchases so that customers can receive points. As they spend more they earn more points. In turn, with the points they can save on future purchases. The loyalty members also receive discounts for their birthdays.

== Other Stores Owned by Reitman's Ltd Canada ==
Addition Elle, RW&CO, Thyme Maternity

== See also ==
- List of Canadian department stores
