= Homes Alive Pets =

Canadian pet store

- Industry: Pet store
- Founded: 1974
- Headquarters: Edmonton, Alberta, Canada
- Website: homesalive.ca

Homes Alive Pets is a Canadian pet supply retailer with stores in Alberta, British Columbia, and Manitoba. The company offers products for dogs, cats, small pets, birds, reptiles, and fish.

== History ==
Founded in 1974, Homes Alive Pets is headquartered in Edmonton, Alberta. It became a retailer of pet food, treats, accessories, and products in Western Canada. The company provides cat and dog food from North American brands, such as Orijen, Hill's Pet Nutrition, and Royal Canin. In May 2023, Homes Alive Pets entered a strategic partnership with Quebec company Legault Group.

Homes Alive Pets operates six brick-and-mortar stores in Alberta, including three locations in Edmonton, two in Lethbridge, and Calgary. In November 2021, the business expanded outside of Alberta with a retail location in Langley, British Columbia. A year later, the Kelowna store launched in March 2022. In November 2024, Homes Alive Pets opened a store in Winnipeg, Manitoba. Homes Alive Pets also offers online delivery across Canada.

== Charitable activities ==
=== Donations ===
Homes Alive Pets is involved in pet supply donation drives across Canada. In May 2021, Homes Alive Pets and its partner Blue Buffalo donated 5,000 pounds of cat food to animal rescue groups, including Second Chance Animal Rescue Society (SCARS), Greater Edmonton Animal Rescue Society (GEARS), and Alberta Animal Rescue Crew Society (AARCS). In December 2024, it coordinated with the City of Edmonton's Animal Care and Control Centre to collect pet food donations for Edmonton's Food Bank. Homes Alive Pets also participated in a holiday fundraiser by Calgary Humane Society.

=== Animal rescues ===
Homes Alive Pets is a regular sponsor of the Edmonton International Cat Festival, an annual event that raises money for local animal rescue groups. The company also offers support for animal welfare organizations across Canada. Partnerships include Humane Animal Rescue Team (HART), a non-profit organization that rescues abandoned and stray dogs in Edmonton, and Last Chance Cat Ranch, the largest no-kill cat rescue in Southern Alberta. Homes Alive Pets also assists Little Cats Lost, which provides safe trap-neuter-return programs for cats in Edmonton, and Langley Animal Protection Society (LAPS), an emergency animal shelter in Langley.
