= Silver Centre =

Ghost town in Ontario, Canada

Coordinates: 47.20°N 79.50°W

Silver Centre is a ghost town in Timiskaming District, Northeastern Ontario, Canada, situated in South Lorrain Township. It is located approximately 35 km (22 mi) south of North Cobalt, and 3 km (1.9 mi) west of Highway 567. Silver Centre was a secondary camp to the great silver fields of Cobalt, discovered in 1903. There are no current residents in Silver Centre. It is still an active mineral field and does at times have active mineral exploration.

The first discovery of silver in the area was made in the 1874 by a lumberman named Pat Manion. He blazed a stump as a witness or discovery tree and showed his sample to his fellow workers at the bunkhouse; everybody believed the sample to be common lead, and Manion agreed. A decade later while discussing his find to a young geologist, Manion discovered that the sample was nearly pure silver, to his surprise. Manion returned to the Ryan Timber Limit where he searched in vain for the location, but was unsuccessful in his attempt. The story of Manion's lost silver mine became legendary throughout the Gatineau-Ottawa region. In August 1903 silver was quickly discovered near the railway bed during the construction of the Temiskaming and Northern Ontario Railway. The discovery made at Long Lake, 103 mi (166 km) north of North Bay, was spectacular. And within one year a silver rush occurred and subsequently the town of Cobalt was established to cater to the world's greatest silver region.

The South Lorrain camp produced the Keeley "nugget", which weighed 4,402 pounds and contained 24,222 ounces of silver.

== Rediscovery and initial boom 1907–1910 ==
A young Robert Jowsey who grew up with the story of Manion's lost silver mine obtained a crude map from William Purcell, another lumberman who worked with Manion in the Ryan Timber Limit. In 1907, Jowsey, prompted by the stories of the rich silver strikes of Cobalt, arrived at Haileybury and quickly teamed up with two seasoned prospectors, James Wood and Charlie Keeley. The three men arrived in South Lorrain Township where a number of prospectors were already on the scene. In October, James Wood discovered a small piece of float which contained some visible silver. An assay test was made which disclosed over 11,000 oz (310,000 g) of silver per ton. The sample also disclosed cobalt, an associated but well sought-after mineral. A few months later Manion's discovery post was found by Woods.

Prospectors, promoters and mining men filled the region by 1908, and over 1500 men were in the region looking for silver. The following year three mines were in production: Keeley, Bellellen and Wettlaufer. In 1908 the government of Ontario stepped in to alleviate the difficulties involved with mining development. On the shores of Lake Timiskaming, at a location formerly known as Sullivan's Landing, 8 km (5.0 mi) east of the camp, the authorities laid out a town site, erected a 200 ft (61 m) wharf and built a tote road to the camp.

By 1909, three active mines were in production the Keeley, Bellellen and the Wettlaufer mines. At the lakeside town site a dozen businesses established themselves to cater to the boom. The Temiskaming Navigation company assumed steamship services, while the site counted a general store, a school, a restaurant, a hardware store, a few cartage and freighting companies and other enterprises. Just south of the government town site a small mining company, which failed to find silver on their lakeside claim, subdivided a portion of their land into a town site as well and sold housing lots. At the camp, a branch of the Farmers Bank, a financier of the Keely Mine, was established.

== Decline, stagnation and renewed exploration 1910–1918 ==
In 1910 activity was waning in the district as no additional discoveries of silver were made. Of the three operating mines, only one, the Wettlaufer, proved feasible. In 1911 the Keeley Mine suspended operations after the Farmers Bank collapsed; shortly afterward the Bellellen also closed down, followed by the Wettlaufer in 1913. The camp's total production by 1913 consisted of a little more than 2,500,000 oz (71,000,000 g) of silver; the Keeley and Bellellen produced approximately 30,000 oz (850,000 g) each while the Wettlaufer held the balance of the camp's production at slightly less than 2,500,000 oz (71,000,000 g).

During the remainder of the decade the camp stood still and silent due in part from a lack of financing, the Great War (1914–18) and partially from the camps dismal production record. Activity at the camp was restricted to some minor leasing and exploration efforts. Much of the exploration activity was conducted by James MacItosh Bell on the Keeley Mine, who theorized that the bulk of the silver still lay deep within the rock. In 1916 the Curry Mine was brought into production but mostly operated by a lease on the Wettlaufer mine, whose main production vein crossed 50 feet into the Curry property.

At the landing town site most businesses and residents had left, though steamships still called. The few remaining residents moved inland some 5 km (inland) at the edge of the active mining field at Loon Lake. By 1912 a general store, restaurant and a few stores had relocated here to be nearer to the one active mine, the Wettlaufer. The small rag-tag settlement became the de facto town site for area residents. The school and post office both relocated here and a small Catholic church was erected.

== Renewed development and second boom 1918–1930 ==
By the end of the decade renewed hopes were beginning to shine on the camp. Enough exploration work had been conducted while Bell's encouraging reports were finally giving the camp some positive results. In 1918, new ore reserves were disclosed at the Keely mine; however, it would take four more years before the Keeley became fully operational. A second property began to show promise in 1920 as well. The Haileybury Silver property (Frontier) had received some attention and soon the need for cobalt would prompt this property back under the microscope. In 1921 extensive drilling and intense underground drifting disclosed ample cobalt reserve and eventually a large silver ore shoot indicating over 200,000 oz (5,700,000 g) of silver was discovered. The junior company quickly sold the property to the Mining Corporation of Canada, a major silver producer based in Cobalt, for $525,000. By the end of 1922 the Frontier Mine was the second mine fully operational and like the Keeley, had begun to ship high-grade ore. The T&NO Railway found the prospects at Silver so enticing that it announced the construction of a branchline to the which was finally completed in 1924. The Keeley and Frontier add stamp and flotation mills to recuperate the rich mill grade ores associated with the native silver.

The following year in 1925, Mining Corporation, which held a number of claims to the south of the Keeley Mine, reorganized them into the Lorrain Trout Lake Mine. Exploration and underground drilling indicated enough ore for a third mine on the fable Woods Vein. Other properties were re-explored, a few were closely examined, and a few were brought into production throughout the decade. The Harris Mine opened in 1925 and the Curry in 1930. Cobalt was also produced as a byproduct and proved very lucrative; in most instances it paid for the operations of the mines.

By the middle of the 1920s, while Cobalt's production was slowing down, Silver Centre's was at the height of its boom years. The new mining activity prompted the development of a third new town site, this time situated at the camp. As early as 1915 Eugene Provencher moved his store and the post office to the Montrose property's bunkhouse from Loon Lake. By 1918 a few residents brave enough to squat on inactive claims did so as well. This time the owners of such claims no longer actively pursued the removal of squatters but welcomed them, leasing lots for a nominal monthly fee. In 1924 there were over 65 homes at the camp as well several new businesses such as a rooming house, a movie theatre, a general store, a confectionery and ice cream shop, a motor garage, a barber shop, restaurant and a Chinese laundry. The new community counted two schools; an English public school and a separate French school where Catholic and Anglican services were also conducted on Sundays. Near the end of the branch line the T&NO built a two-story station a water tank and wye for the trains. They even built a bunkhouse for the section men stationed there and employed a full-time station agent.

Near the old government wharf at the "old Silver Centre" or Sullivan's Landing, a new community had emerged just to the north of the old settlement. Established in the early 1920s around three smaller mines, the small hamlet sprouted around Maidens Creek. The creek and the post office established in 1926 by the name of Maidens was named for Norman Maidens who staked and worked nearly two decades on his claims before it became a producing mine. At the height of the boom Maidens could claim a dozen homes, a school and a store.

== Decline and abandonment ==
The prosperity of the 1920s would prove very brief, however; by 1928 ore reserves were declining. After the great stock market crash of 1929, silver prices plummeted worldwide and stood below to at $0.38 in 1930 making silver mining nearly unprofitable. In 1931 the Keeley Mine ceased operations permanently after producing 11,652,806 oz (330,351,500 g) of silver and 1,589,972 lb (721,199 kg) of cobalt. The same year the Lorain Trout Lake Mine shut down after producing 1,083,721 oz (30,723,000 g) of silver and 51,721 lb (23,460 kg) of cobalt, a respectable sum for a mid-sized mine. The Frontier Mine finally followed suit in 1932 after producing 6,646,293 oz (188,419,200 g) of silver and 1,626,735 lb (737,875 kg) of cobalt. The total production of the camp between 1918 and 1932 stood an astounding 19,409,491 oz (550,249,800 g) of silver and 3,282,301 lb (1,488,827 kg) of cobalt.

With dwindling mining activity after 1931 the exodus of miners, businessmen and residents accentuated. By 1935 less than 100 people remained at the site. With no traffic the T&NO closed the Lorrain branch shortly after in 1935 lifted the entire branch line. Little was left of Silver Centre by the close of the 1930s, the schools closed in 1937 as did the post office in 1939. The Silver Centre Camp once a rival to Cobalt was no more than a distant memory. After 1940 no one remained at the camp proper, and only a few residents remained at Maidens. In 1961 Harry Miller after much success reworking old defunct mines in Cobalt and Brady Lake turned his attention on the Keeley-Frontier properties. Between 1961 and 1965 he rehabilitated the Keeley #3 and produced a small amount of silver. After his death in a car accident mining stopped and little was done until the 1980s and 90s where exploration resulted in some production.

Today very little remains except for rubble, tailings and much waste rock. Amidst the grass and trees a few foundations can be discerned, notably Miller's rehabilitated #3 shaft. At the old landing town site only a few posts and foundations remain as well as the footing for the old wharf. Silver Centre is today a very dangerous place to visit; unlike Cobalt none of its shafts are fenced off or stabilized and lie everywhere amongst the rejuvenating forest. Exploration of the site by the public should be strictly discouraged. To this day mining companies and private interests retain ownership of the claims and it is private property.

== Sources ==
- Fancy, Peter Fenwick, Silver Centre: The story of an Ontario mining camp, volume 1 & 2, Highway Book Shop, Cobalt, Ontario, 1985
- Fancy, Peter Fenwick, A Road Guide To Historic Lorrain Townships, Highway Book Shops, Cobalt, 1995
- McIlwaine, W.H., Geology of South Lorrain Township, Report 83, Ontario Department of Mines and Northern Affairs, 1970.
- Surtees, Robert J., The Northern Connection: Ontario Northland Since 1902, Captus Press, 1992
- Yvan P.Charbonneau: Text adapted by author from a previously published work entitled: Silver Centre; The Booms and Bust of a Silver Camp in Northern Ontario (1907–1940)
