= Sheyla Bonnick =

Jamaican-British singer-songwriter (born 1950s)

- Also known as: Sheila Bonnick, Sheila Bonnique, Sheila Bonique, Shella Bonnick
- Born: Sheila Yvonne Bonnick
- Origin: England
- Genres: Dance-pop, dance, soul
- Occupation: Singer
- Years active: 1975–present
- Website: boneymsheylabonnick.com

Sheyla Bonnick is a singer-songwriter, performer, co-producer, fashion designer, author, talent scout, reiki healer and games designer.

== Early life ==
Bonnick was born in Jamaica in the 1950s. Her mother was a teacher and a seamstress and her father was a shoemaker. At the age of three, Bonnick moved to England with her parents. After leaving school, Bonnick modelled and got a secretarial job at a prestigious law firm. She then went to work at EMI records.

== Music career ==
In the early 1970s, aged eighteen, Bonnick moved to Hanover. She had answered an advert in The Stage newspaper for a dance contract in Germany. After a few months, Bonnick and her friend Maizie Williams, auditioned for music producer Frank Farian. Frank had no hesitation and recruited them to join a new pop group, called Boney M. Sheyla stayed with the group for a few months and for some live performances however she was not a member in the final line-up and was not part of the later studio recordings either. Sheyla was later given a solo record deal on Hansa International.

In 1977, Bonnick joined Munich disco project Mandrake for the recording of "It's Time for Us", "Dancing The Night Away" and "Disco Magic". She then signed to Hansa International, releasing a disco cover of "Proud Mary", credited to "Sheila Bonnique". She recorded another track, "In the Shadows" which appeared on the soundtrack album of German film A Woman in Flames (1983). In the early 90s, she moved to Denmark with her Icelandic husband and manager where she co-wrote a mini-musical called "Money Talks" staged for some months in the Lindenborg inn. In 1993, Bonnick and Maizie Williams joined forces again, along with two other singers, to form their own tribute version called Maizie Williams feat Boney M. The group toured the world, but Bonnick eventually left and formed her own show, Sounds of Boney M.

Bonnick released the single "Live Better" with Latvian artist Rassell on May 20, 2013 before producing the album "Angel Cures" by member Francesca Mowatt.

Bonnick continues to perform and tour with her Sounds of Boney M Show which has included international Soul and Gospel artist Freddie Lee Peterkin as the male lead.

== Other ventures ==
Bonnick published the book "Women Are Like Cats And Men Are Like Dogs - Or Are They?" under pseudonym Kat Brown.

Bonnick owns fashion line BONNIE FASHIONS which specialises in exclusive stage and evening wear.

Bonnick co-designed board games Kivi, Eye Catch and Sneak Peek. Eye Catch was a 2019 MinD-Spielepreis Short Game nominee (the award of the German Mensa organization). Kivi was awarded the 2016 Vuoden Peli Party Game of the Year.

== Personal life ==
Bonnick and her Icelandic husband reside in London. They also have a home in Spain.

Bonnick's hobbies/interests include reading, writing, astrology, psychology, cooking, sports, philosophy, complimentary medicines and dressmaking.

Bonnick is a patron of Second Chance Animal Rescue which is situated in Swanley, Kent.

== Award recognitions ==
- Human Values Award Gala

European Tolerance Award 2022. Budapest, Hungary

- Human Values Award Gala

European Equal Opportunities Grand Prize 2023. Budapest, Hungary

=== Források és hivatkozások ===
Redblek honlapja

- Romnet honlapja
- Tollas Tímea honlapja
- Êszakhirnök honlapja
- Ellenszél honlapja
- Sztárlimonádé magazin honlapja

- Az Emberi Értékek Díjátadó Gála eseménynaptára
