= Frontier Centre (Saskatchewan, Canada) =

- Location: North Battleford, Saskatchewan, Canada
- Coordinates: 52°45′37″N 108°16′26″W
- Address: 11429 Railway Ave East
- Floor area: 205,000 sq ft (19,000 m^{2})
- Website: https://frontiermall.ca/

Frontier Centre (sometimes seen labeled as Frontier Mall) is a shopping mall located in Saskatchewan, Canada along the Trans-Canada Yellowhead Highway. The mall was built in 1974 and occupies about 221,000 square feet. It features many businesses including Dollarama, No Frills, Shoppers Drug Mart, Staples, and Peavey Mart. There are also several businesses located along the periphery of the mall including a Mobil fuel station, Tim Hortons, and Burger King.
