= Thyme Maternity =

Maternity clothing label

- Industry: Apparel
- Founder: Max Konisberg (Shirmax); Herman Reitman (Reitmans)
- Fate: RW&CO. relaunched Thyme Maternity label within its stores and on its website on August 15, 2022. Previously, parent Company, Reitmans (Canada) Limited, announced on June 1, 2020 the closing of all Thyme Maternity stores.
- Headquarters: 250 Sauve Street West, Montreal, Quebec, Canada
- Number of locations: 0
- Area served: Canada and the U.S.
- Key people: Jeremy Reitman; Steven Reitman
- Products: Trendy maternity fashions and nursing essentials
- Parent: Reitmans
- Website: thymematernity.com

Thyme Maternity was relaunched as a label within RW&CO. stores and on its website as of August 15, 2022. The new collection includes stylish, versatile, and functional pieces for people to feel confident during their pregnancy, post pregnancy and beyond.

The Thyme Maternity collection is available online at rw-co.com on August 15 and in select RW&CO. stores across Canada in September 2022.

== History ==
=== Early history ===
Reitmans had its beginnings in the early 1900s when Herman and Sarah Reitman ran a small department store in Montreal. The Reitmans Company was founded after a second store opened in 1926. Since then, a number of stores have opened every year, and other banners have emerged, namely Smart Set, RW&CO., Penningtons, Addition Elle and Thyme Maternity.

The Thyme Maternity brand dates back to at least October 1993, when it was under the ownership of Shirmax Fashions Ltd, and operated by its subsidiary, Shirmax Retail Ltd. The Montreal company also operated Shirley K, a larger maternity clothing brand. A Singapore company licensed the Thyme brand in 1999, intending to open five locations.

In June, 2002, Reitmans acquired Shirmax Fashions Ltd., which operated 109 Addition Elle stores and 66 Thyme Maternity stores.

On June 2, 2020, Reitmans announced that it would close all Thyme Maternity stores as part of its restructuring process, in part due to financial challenges relating to the COVID-19 pandemic.

As shown on its website, Thyme Maternity later confirmed that its online store and all shops have been closed permanently.

On August 15, 2022, RW&CO., a Reitmans (Canada) Limited brand, announced the Thyme Maternity Collection launch for Fall 2022. The Thyme Maternity collection is available online at rw-co.com on August 15 and in select RW&CO. stores across Canada in September 2022.

=== Partner relationships ===
In September 2011, Thyme Maternity opened 10 shop-in-shops in select Babies"R"Us locations in Canada as well as launched online sales of their maternity offering on babiesrus.ca. There are currently 23 of these shops in operation in Canada.

In September 2012, Thyme Maternity opened 150 shop-in-shop locations in select Babies"R"Us locations throughout the U.S. as well as launched online sales on babiesrus.com. There are currently over 160 of these shops in operation in the United States.

In 2013, Thyme partnered with Baby Buggy, a nonprofit organization founded by Jessica Seinfeld. Baby Buggy provides essential maternity and baby-related items to families in need. Through this partnership, Thyme donated maternity and nursing clothing to pregnant women and new moms in the United States.

In 2022,.

=== Photography ===
Thyme used real pregnant models in all of its photography.
