= Gavilon =

Commodity storage and management company

Gavilon is a commodity management firm based in Omaha, Nebraska. The company is organized into two operating segments:

== Operating segments ==
Grain & Ingredients – Gavilon originates, stores, and distributes grains and oilseeds, as well as feed and food ingredients, to food manufacturers, livestock producers, poultry processors, soybean processors and ethanol producers worldwide.

Fertilizer – The company also partners with offshore suppliers and leverages its global logistics system to provide customers competitively priced fertilizer.

Gavilon uses the futures market to manage price risk associated with inventory positions and forward contracts.

== History ==
The company’s history dates back to 1874, when Minneapolis-based Peavey Company built its first grain facility. In 1967 the Canadian operations began and later renamed as Peavey Mart. In 1982, Peavey was acquired by ConAgra Foods, Inc. and later became part of ConAgra Trade Group. In 1984 Peavey Mart was sold to the Canadian management team. In 2008, a group of investors formed Gavilon and acquired ConAgra Trade Group, enabling the privately held company to focus on growing its commodity business. In 2010, Gavilon acquired the DeBruce Companies, which significantly expanded the company’s agricultural operations. In 2013, Marubeni Corporation, one of the largest general trading companies in Japan, purchased the company's agriculture assets and businesses. Later that year, Gavilon's energy business was sold to NGL Energy Partners LP (NYSE: NGL).

Today, Gavilon employs 2,000 people around the world and is the second largest grain handler in North America based on storage capacity.

In 2022, Gavilon was purchased by Viterra for $1.1 billion. It is expected Gavilon will be fulling integrated in Viterra by early 2023.

=== Bee Branch Mussel Killing ===
On June 18, 2020, two containers at a Gavilon Grain plant containing a million gallons of liquid nitrogen fertilizer were spilled into the Bee Branch in Dubuque, Iowa. An estimated 432,000 U.S. gallons (1,640,000 L) of fertilizer was spilled into a storm drain that flows into the Bee Branch. The accident was caused by a mistake transferring nitrogen, with the receiving tank overfilling. The transfer was not being watched nor was the spill immediately reported. This severely damaged the mussel population, causing the largest mussel kill in the state of Iowa and killed numerous fish. They died due to high concentrations of ammonia. A second killing happened as the leftover fertilizer was washed back into the Bee Branch.

The company was fined $270,000. The largest fine of $244,705 was issued to restore giant floater and plain pocketbook mussels. Gavilon also agreed to pay $18,828 for fish restoration. An administrative penalty of $7,000 was issued by the Iowa DNR, which is lower than is required to be issued under Iowa law.

Gavilon made a "three-pronged plan" to clean the Bee Branch. First, Gavilon would pump air into the southeast area of the basin. Second, Gavilon would recirculate water in the affected area. Thirdly, Gavilon asked the DNR for permission to flush the sewer to remove any ammonia left there.
