= A&B Sound =

Defunct Canadian home electronics retailer

- Type: Public
- Industry: Retail
- Founded: 1959
- Defunct: 2008; 18 years ago
- Headquarters: Richmond, British Columbia, Canada
- Products: Electronics

A&B Sound was a Canadian company.

== History ==
A&B Sound was founded by Fred Steiner in 1959. The first store was located at 571 Granville St., and in 1970 it moved to 556 Seymour Street. The store initially sold televisions, stereos and radio equipment, adding music later that year.

=== Expansion throughout British Columbia ===
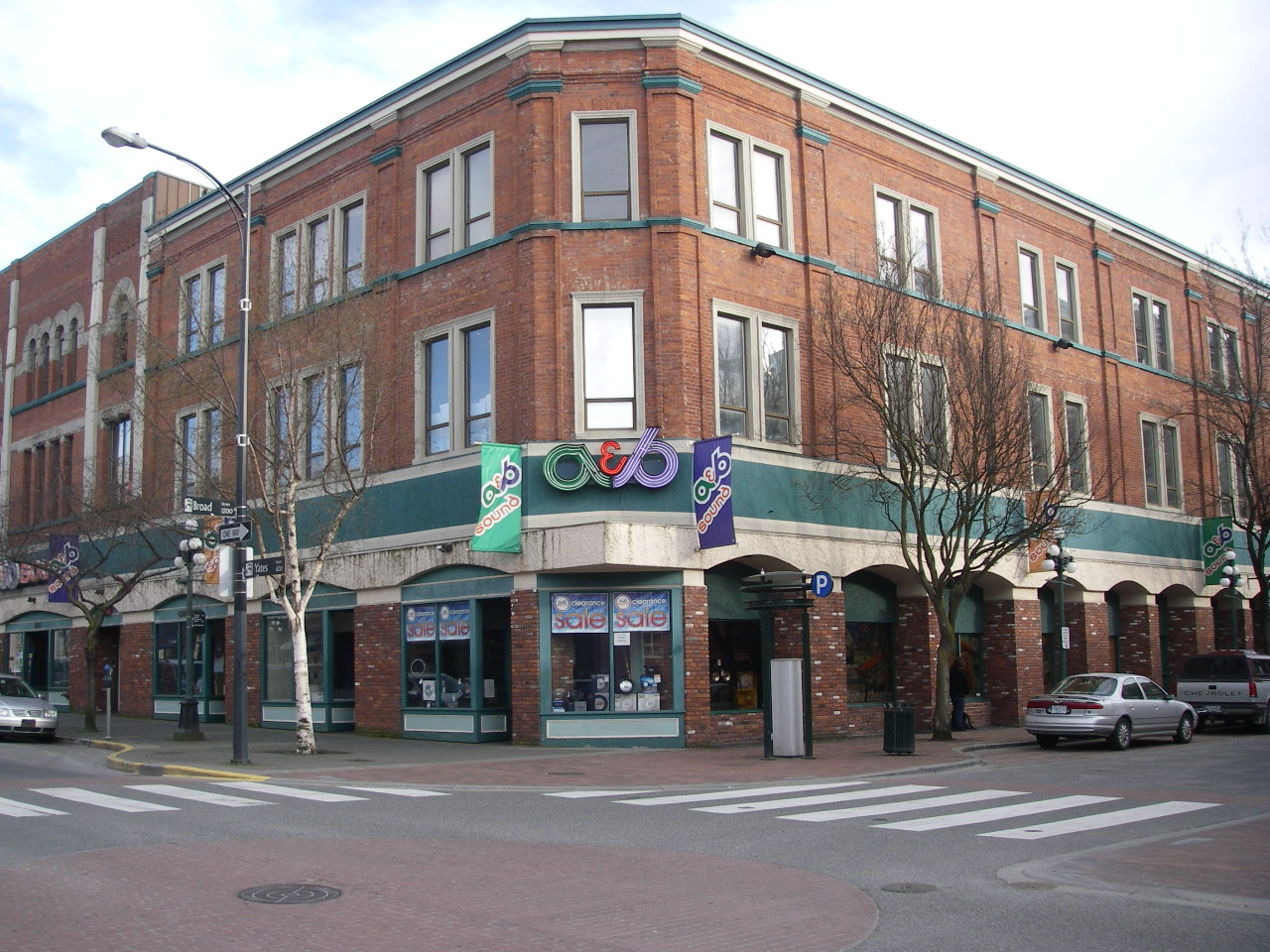
The former Downtown Victoria A&B Sound founded by Fred Steiner

A second store opened in 1977 in Victoria, British Columbia in a building once used as that city's first hospital, and later as a brothel. This building is now home to a number of businesses and the University of Victoria's poverty law clinic, known as the Law Centre. In 1980, the company's Vancouver location expanded to three floors, followed in 1981 by the construction of a new store on Hastings Street, near the border of Burnaby. A fourth location opened in 1984 on South West Marine Drive in Vancouver.

Fred Steiner retired in 1987, and his son Nick became president of A&B Sound. New stores subsequently opened in Surrey (1987), Burnaby's Metrotown area (1988), and Nanaimo (1990). Fred Steiner died in 1991, the same year that the East Hastings location moved into a larger property at the corner of Hastings Street and the Trans Canada Highway, close to the PNE Playland. The following year, an eighth store opened in Kelowna.

=== Expansion into Western Canada ===
In 1993, A&B Sound moved into the Alberta market, opening locations in Calgary and Edmonton, followed by south Edmonton (1994), a second Calgary location (1995), Lethbridge (1996), and Red Deer and a third Calgary outlet in autumn 1998. Also in 1995, a store was opened in Abbotsford, British Columbia. Expansion continued throughout Western Canada, with new stores in Regina and Saskatoon, Saskatchewan (1999) and Winnipeg, Manitoba (2000). In 2001, Nick Steiner stepped aside as president, retaining his role as chairman, and long-time CEO Tim Howley became president and CEO. A number of locations, such as those in Calgary, also included bookstore sections, though by the start of the 2000s decade most of these sections had been removed.

=== Impact on Vancouver's record, tape and CD retail industry ===
For years, A&B Sound maintained a reputation in the western Canadian music market for having the lowest prices and best selection on records, cassettes, and later, CDs. Often, the chain would out-price other major retailers, including A&A Records and Tapes, as well as Toronto-based Sam the Record Man, which was unable to penetrate the Vancouver market with as much success as it had in eastern Canada. A downtown Vancouver location of Sam the Record Man was located next door to A&B Sound's Seymour Street location until late in 2000, when it was closed. In a 1993 article in The Georgia Straight newspaper, it is noted that A&B Sound's aggressive pricing policies resulted in Vancouver having the lowest record prices of any Canadian metropolis. These low prices were not only blamed for the failures of other chains, but may have been one reason for some chains not opening stores in Vancouver, including Tower Records, which had scouted Vancouver as a possible location to expand into Canada. When HMV finally opened stores in the Vancouver area in 1993, HMV Canada's then-president, Paul Alofs, said that breaking into the Vancouver market would be difficult. "A&B is certainly a very strong competitor, and we have a lot of respect for what they do."

=== Bankruptcy and a new owner ===
In the 1990s and 2000s decade, A&B began to face increasing competition for music, DVD and electronics sales. Vancouver-based Future Shop added music to its product mix, using the same aggressive pricing structure it did with consumer electronics. Besides HMV, other retail giants including Wal-Mart and Best Buy entered the marketplace as well, the latter having purchased Future Shop in the early 2000s decade. In early 2005, with a debt of C$57 million, A&B Sound filed for protection under Canadian bankruptcy regulations. A sale to American company Sun Capital Partners Group Inc. was announced, but this sale was not approved by A&B's creditors. Instead, the company was purchased by Canadian computer manufacturer Seanix Technology Inc., based in Richmond and led by Paul Girard. He announced that they planned to close down or relocate some of the branches that were losing money and focus on the BC and Alberta markets. That year and the next, a number of employees were laid off, and several locations were closed, including both the Winnipeg stores in 2005, the Hastings Street store in January 2006, and in August 2006, their Red Deer, Regina, and Saskatoon locations. Its high-profile Downtown Calgary store was also closed in February 2005, although that city maintained locations in the northeast and deep south. Meanwhile, new locations were opened in the city of North Vancouver and Pitt Meadows, while the Kelowna, south Calgary, and Surrey stores were relocated. In March 2007, the Downtown Edmonton location closed, with plans to re-open another Edmonton location in the works. The Burnaby location was also closed around this time. On December 15, 2007, a new location opened in Langford (near Victoria). On January 4, 2008, the Delta store, which had re-located from Surrey, was closed. In early 2008, A&B was planning to open a new store in Chilliwack, located not far from the local Future Shop. In July 2008, all signs for this location were removed, and plans for the Chilliwack location were scrapped.

=== Store closures and second bankruptcy ===
On April 3, 2008, it was announced the historic Victoria location would close. On April 8, 2008, A&B Sound said that it would be joining the Audiotronic chain, but nothing further came of this.

On July 23, 2008, management made the decision to close the Nanaimo location. Several days later, on July 29, 2008, the decision was made to abruptly close the once-profitable Calgary North location as well, leaving A&B with no remaining presence in Calgary, as the south location had been dismantled a few months earlier after only a year in its new location. Employees and management at both branches were greeted to a locked front door and a message stating that the location had been shut down, with no prior notice.

Over the next few months, the remainder of the A&B Sound chain collapsed, with its remaining branches closing on the following dates:

- August 12, 2008 - Shutdown of the two remaining Vancouver stores, Seymour and Marine Drive.
- August 29, 2008 - Langley, B.C. (Greater Vancouver).
- September 18, 2008 - Pitt Meadows.
- October 23, 2008 - The South Edmonton and Abbotsford store were closed, although both re-opened briefly later in the week for liquidation sales.
- November 7, 2008 - The last remaining A&B Sound store in North Vancouver closes.

The collapse of A&B Sound was predicted by retail analysts during the summer of 2008. Retail Analyst David Ian Gray was quoted as saying, "I think they're done. They had to close stores, for sure, but they're getting to a point where their brand is lost, and I just don't see them being able to restart it." A&B, on its website, wrote a letter to its employees and customers stating that they had to restructure their business to work in today's market, so the business itself believed it would continue on. However, A&B dropped its A&B credit card from Wells Fargo October 15, 2008, and as expected, no replacement was issued.

On November 7, 2008, A&B Sound officially announced that it had gone out of business, joining a number of other now-defunct Canadian music chains, including A&A Records and Sam the Record Man.

Since the final store closed in late 2008, A&B Sound's remaining inventory was in limbo, with a briefly advertised sale in its Abbotsford location cancelled without explanation. However, in late June 2011, the inventory resurfaced; Able Auctions in Vancouver was liquidating the remaining stock on Saturday, June 25.
