= Beth Newlands Campbell =

Ex-president of Canadian pharmacy chain

Beth Newlands Campbell was the President of Rexall Drugstore, a Canadian pharmaceutical chain owned by McKesson Canada.

She graduated from Cornell's College of Agriculture and Life Sciences with a business degree.

Newlands Campbell spent 27 year at Delhaize America, named as Hannaford President in 2009 and Food Lion President in December 2012. She was hired by Sobeys as president of its Ontario and Atlantic division, in April 2016. She joined Rexall in August 2017.
