= Ali Asaria =

Canadian businessman and software developer

Ali Asaria is a Canadian businessman and software developer, known for founding Tulip and Well.ca, and for developing the Brick Breaker game for BlackBerry. In 2017, he created the Tulip Foundation with a pledge to donate 80% of his shares to charity.

== Career ==
Asaria developed the Brick Breaker game, a Breakout clone,which came pre-loaded on certain BlackBerry devices manufactured by Research In Motion.

In 2008, Asaria founded Well.ca, an e-commerce retailer based in Guelph, Ontario, after deciding to sell products from his father's pharmacy online. He served as the company's founder and CEO until 2013, when he stepped down and Rebecca McKillican succeeded him as CEO. The company was acquired by McKesson Canada in December 2017.

After leaving Well.ca, Asaria founded Tulip Retail (later Tulip), an enterprise retail technology company, with initial funding of $2.4 million; the company went on to raise more than $50 million from investors including Kleiner Perkins

== Philanthropy ==
In 2017, Asaria established the Tulip Foundation, pledging to donate 80% of his company shares to charitable causes.
