= Brick Breaker =

1999 video game

- Publisher: Digital Chocolate
- Platforms: BlackBerry iOS; Windows Phone 7
- Release: WW: 1999
- Genre: Breakout clone
- Modes: Single-player, multiplayer

Brick Breaker is a mobile video game developed by Canadian developer Ali Asaria, that came preloaded on certain BlackBerry devices.

== Gameplay ==
Gameplay from the original release of Brick Breaker

Brick Breaker is a Breakout clone in which the player must smash a wall of bricks by deflecting a bouncing ball with a paddle. The paddle may move horizontally and is controlled with the BlackBerry's trackwheel, the computer's mouse or the touch of a finger (in the case of touchscreen). The player gets three lives to start with; a life is lost if the ball hits the bottom of the screen. When all the bricks have been destroyed, the player advances to a new, harder level. There are 34 levels. Many levels have unbreakable silver bricks. If all lives are lost, the game is over. There are many versions of Brick Breaker, some in which players can shoot flaming fireballs or play with more than one ball if the player gets a power up.

== Reception ==
Brick Breaker has a cult following of professional players trying to achieve high scores. The game's addictiveness was highlighted by The Vancouver Sun; there are "dozens of forums, support groups and yes, a Brick Breaker Addiction Facebook page, with spouses complaining of addicted mates."

== Lawsuit ==
After Atari issued a number of threats, BlackBerry operator Research In Motion sued Atari in an Ontario court in 2006, claiming that Brick Breaker does not infringe Atari copyrights related to Breakout.
