= Stedmans V&S =

Canadian discount department store

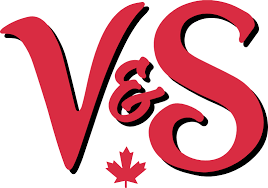
- Type: Discount store chain
- Industry: Retail
- Founded: 1907
- Products: Clothing, grocery, footwear, bedding, beauty products, and housewares.
- Parent: Tru Serv Canada Inc. (former)

Stedmans V&S (for Variety & Savings) is a Canadian variety discount department store chain. Depending on the location, it is normally referred to simply as Stedmans or the V&S.

Stedmans operates its stores mainly in smaller towns and cities in Canada. The chain's stores today are comparable in size and merchandise offered to similar chains such as Fields, SAAN (now defunct) and The Bargain! Shop, with a number of stores also offering such services as photo finishing, laminating, faxing and photocopying, and dry cleaning drop-off.

The first store, in Brantford Ontario, started as a stationery store in 1907. During the 1950s and 1960s, there were over 1000 Stedmans and affiliated stores in Canada. The affiliated stores were privately owned variety stores operating under different names, though purchasing through Stedmans. During the late 1960s through the 1970s, there were several stores across Canada that were "combination" stores operating both a Stedmans and its sister chain Macleods Hardware. Some stores today still contain a restaurant named The Copper Grill.

From about the 1960s into the 1980s, though, many Stedmans stores were also located in larger cities. Those stores were similar in size to those of the Kmart and Woolco chains, with a large selection of merchandise; those locations often served as anchor tenants for suburban shopping centers and malls.

The chain downsized through the 1990s. Today, the remaining Stedman's V&S stores are independently owned, and there is no longer a purchasing group.

== Company ownership ==
- 1962: Stedmans purchased by Gamble-Skogmo from Stedmans Brothers Ltd.
- 1980: CanWest Capital (later CanWest Global) purchases Macleod-Stedmans Ltd.
- 1992: Macleod-Stedmans Inc. becomes a dealer-owned cooperative named Cotter Canada. It would later be renamed Tru Serv Canada.
- 2011: Tru Serv Canada is purchased by Rona, Inc.
- 2014: Tru Serv Canada rebrands as Ace Canada
- 2020: Peavey Industries acquires Ace Canada
