= Reinmann =

Reinmann is a German surname. Notable people with the surname include:

- Arthur Reinmann (1901–1983), Swiss weightlifter
- Baptist Reinmann (1903–1980), German footballer
- Thomas Reinmann (born 1983), Swiss footballer

== See also ==
- Reinman
