= Tamblyn Drugs =

Chain of pharmacies in Canada

Tamblyn Drugs was a chain of pharmacies in Canada founded by Gordon Tamblyn.

== Founder and Tamblyn banner ==
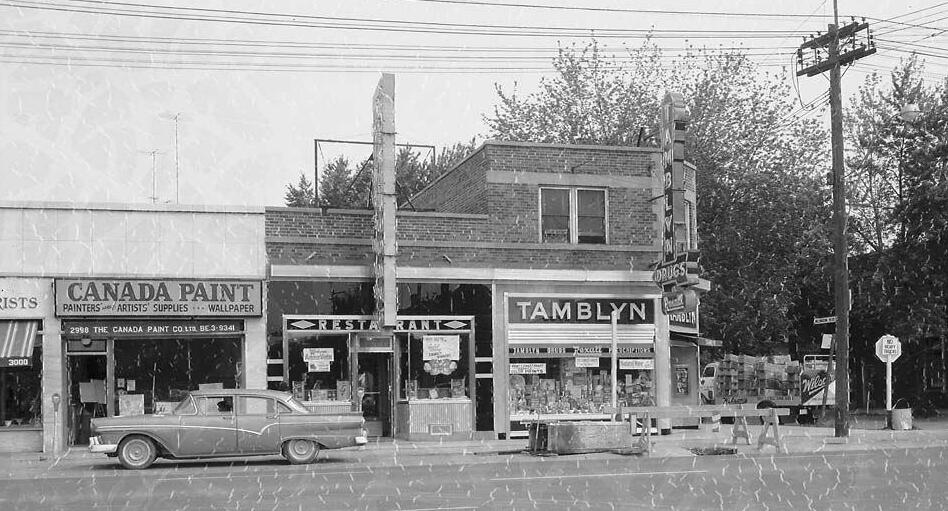
Tamblyn drug store at 2998 Bloor Street West, Toronto, circa 1958

Gordon Tamblyn was born in Belwood, Ontario in 1878. He apprenticed to a druggist in Whitby, Ontario for a few months before enrolling in the Ontario College of Pharmacy. After graduating in 1901 he began work at the Burgess-Powell Pharmacy, on Yonge Street in Toronto. In 1904, with capital of $500, he opened his own pharmacy at Queen Street East and Lee Avenue, in Toronto’s Beaches neighbourhood.

Tamblyn's Cut Rate Drugs featured a soda fountain, as was common for druggists in the early 20th century. The pharmacy also offered a delivery service. He opened a second store in 1907, and in 1910 took over another store from a retiring pharmacist.

Tamblyn incorporated his business in 1911, and began adding new locations almost every year. During the 1920s, Tamblyn's chain expanded to about 60 stores, mainly in the Toronto area, and eventually other parts of Ontario, including Barrie, Chatham-Kent, Guelph, Sarnia

The chain was purchased by United Cigar Stores a few years after the first location opened, as the company had begun expanding. Tamblyn remained in control of the company's drug store operations, and in 1929 he was able to reacquire the business.

Tamblyn died in 1933, however the company continued to operate through The Great Depression and remained prosperous in the post-World War II era.

== As subsidiary 1960 to present ==
George Weston Limited purchased the chain in 1960, and continued to operate it alongside its Loblaws chain of grocery store, creating a "T" logo to match Loblaws' L logo. The chain declined under Weston's management and was sold to the United Kingdom's Boots Group chain in 1978. Boots changed the stores over to the Boots name, and sold the chain in 1988 to Oshawa Group which converted them to the Pharma Plus banner in 1989. In 1997, Pharma Plus was purchased by Katz Group of Companies and re-badged as Rexall beginning in 2015. In 2016 Katz sold Rexall to McKesson Canada.

Some Rexall locations have been continuously operated as pharmacies since the original Tamblyn ownership.

== See also ==
- List of pharmacies
