= Tops 'N' Toys =

Tops 'N' Toys was a Canadian toy retailer chain. The chain included a location in Calgary's Marlborough Mall. The chain had difficulty competing in the market, and disappeared in the 1990s.

Ed Shaben acquired the chain in 1990. While Shaben was later named to the Canadian Toy Industry Hall of Fame, he nonetheless could not make the chain profitable, and he retired from the business in 1992.
