= Keeley-Frontier Mine =

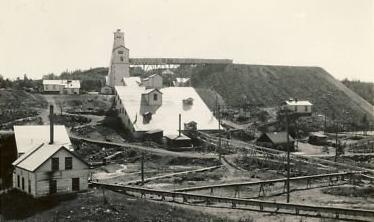
- Postcard photo of the Keeley Mine.

- Location within Ontario
- Location: Silver Centre, Ontario, Ontario, Canada; 47.19917°N 79.50556°W
- Products: Cobalt, copper, nickel, silver

Keeley-Frontier Mine is a large abandoned mine in the ghost town of Silver Centre, Northeastern Ontario, Canada. It consists of two underground mines that were sunk 1,455 ft (443 m) below the surface. Keeley Mine was discovered in 1907 while Frontier Mine was constructed in 1921. The 8th level of the Keeley Mine connected with the 6th level of the Frontier Mine in 1962, creating the two compartment Keeley-Frontier Mine. In 1965, Keeley-Frontier Mine closed with a total production of 19,000,000 oz (540,000,000 g) of silver, 3,300,000 lb (1,500,000 kg) of cobalt, 27,000 lb (12,000 kg) of nickel and 10,000 lb (4,500 kg) of copper.

Keeley-Frontier Mine is considered to have produced some of the finest silver wire specimens in Canada.

Robert Jowsey, Charles Keeley, and John Woods discovered silver after they "lit a fire to thaw out the ground," according to Barnes.

== Keeley Mine ==
The discovery in the Fall of 1907, involved the finding of a smaltite vein 2-6 inches wide containing 11,000 ounces of "wire silver" per ton. "Wood's vein" was discovered the next year. The original vein was developed by the No. 1 shaft and by 1911, Keeley Mine Limited had produced about 24,337 ounces of silver. Associated Gold Mines of Western Australia, Limited, acquired an option on the property in 1913, and a transfer of the property by 1919. The mine produced 12,154,353 ounces of silver and 1,617,784 ounces of cobalt from 1908 to 1942. No production took place between 1943 and 1963. Keeley-Frontier Mines Limited was incorporated in 1959 and reorganized as Kelley-Frontier in 1964.

== Frontier Mine ==
Henry Newburger bought the property from the Haileybury Silver Mining Company, and formed the Haileybury Frontier Company in 1912. Newburger's death in 1914 put a stop to further development until 1920 when the Mining Corporation of Canada, Limited, acquired an option with a final purchase in 1921. The mine produced 7,043,060 ounces of silver, 1,692,772 ounces of cobalt, 25,516 ounces of nickel and 10,292 ounces of copper from 1921 to 1965.

== Geology ==
The silver is located in three main vein systems associated with reverse faults. These vein systems are known as Wood's, No. 16 and No. 28. Most of the silver production occurs in the 300 feet of metavolcanics overlying the Nipissing sills.

== See also ==
- List of mines in Ontario
- Porcupine Gold Rush
- Cobalt silver rush
