= Adventure Electronics =

Canadian consumer electronics retailer

Adventure Electronics Inc (Aventure Électronique in Quebec) was a Canadian big-box consumer electronics retailer with a head office located in Anjou, Quebec. Smaller stores, sized similarly to RadioShack, were called Aventure Boutique. It was once Canada's third-largest consumer electronics retailer after RadioShack and Future Shop.

Founded in 1989 by Robert Fragman, it went bankrupt on November 16, 1998. All of Adventure Electronics' 143 stores were closed, and 1,271 jobs were lost at 85 stores in Québec and 58 in Ontario. In an official statement, the leaders of the consumer electronics chain claimed that their decision was made inevitable following the loss of the financial support their principal creditor, Scotiabank. Scotiabank, owed almost CAD$36,000,000, had given Adventure a week and a half to find more money. The chain, which had been engaged in a recovery plan since the beginning of 1998, resigned itself to the closure of its 143 stores. Its failure was blamed on competition from rival Future Shop, which had expanded into Quebec in 1995.

The demise of Adventure Electronics in 1998 left Future Shop the only big-box consumer electronics retail brand in Canada, until Best Buy acquired Future Shop in 2001 and opened Best Buy locations in 2002.
