= Ben Moss Jewellers =

Canadian jewellery store chain

Ben Moss Jewellers Western Canada Ltd.
- Trade name: Ben Moss Jewellers
- Type: Private
- Industry: Retail
- Founded: 1910
- Founder: Ben Moss
- Headquarters: Winnipeg, Manitoba, Canada
- Number of locations: 16 (2017)
- Area served: Western Canada; Central Canada (until c. 2016)
- Products: Jewellery
- Parent: Charm Diamond Centres (since 2017)
- Website: benmoss.com

Ben Moss Jewellers is a Canadian jewellery store company.

== History ==
Ben Moss Jewellers was founded by Ben Moss in Winnipeg, Manitoba, in 1910.

Upon Moss' passing in 1962, his son-in-law Sidney Trepel took over the single store. From 1962 till 1986, Trepel expanded Ben Moss Jewellers from one store to 17 stores in shopping centres across the prairies. In 1986, Moss' grandson, Brent Trepel, took over the running of the company due to his father's poor health, becoming president and CEO from May 1986 until July 2013, when the company was sold to JSN Jewellery, a manufacturer based out of Toronto.

During his tenure as president and CEO, Brent grew the company to become a leading national retail jewelry chain in Canada with 67 stores and over 600 employees. Under his leadership, Ben Moss Jewellers was named one of the "50 Best Managed Private Companies in Canada" for six consecutive years, "The Most Innovative Retailer of the Year" by the Retail Council of Canada, and "Jewelry Chain Retailer of the Year" by Canadian Jeweler Magazine for two consecutive years. Brent was also named one of “Canada’s Top 40 under 40” by the Financial Post and was a winner of the Ernst & Young Entrepreneur of the Year Award in the business-to-consumer products and services category for the Prairie region.

In 2010, the company had 63 stores in western and central Canada. After financial difficulties, JSN Jewellery was forced to put Ben Moss Jewellers into receivership in 2016. After over 100 years in business, the company announced in July 2016 that it would be shutting down its operations including all 54 store locations.

In January 2017, Halifax-based Charm Diamond Centres announced that it had acquired the brand rights to Ben Moss Jewellers. Charm rehired many former staff members and reopened 2 stores in Winnipeg, as well as announcing their intention to open several other stores in ensuing months.
