= Well.ca =

Canadian e-commerce retailer

- Founded: 2008
- Headquarters: Guelph, Ontario, Canada
- Area served: Canada
- Founder: Ali Asaria
- General manager: Nicole Flynn
- Industry: E-commerce
- Parent: Birch Hill Equity (2024-present); McKesson Corporation (2017–2024)
- Website: well.ca

Well.ca is a Canadian e-commerce retailer based in Guelph, Ontario that specializes in health, beauty, baby, home, and green and natural products. It was founded in 2008 by Ali Asaria.

== History ==
In 2008, Well.ca was created after founder Ali Asaria decided to try online selling of products from his father's pharmacy. The company now has over 250 employees in offices in Guelph and Toronto and sells over 40,000 different products online.

In 2013, Rebecca McKillican became Well.ca's new CEO after founder and previous CEO Ali Asaria stepped down from his role to focus on a new venture. In December 2017, pharmaceutical company McKesson Canada acquired Well.ca.

On September 5, 2024, it was announced that private equity firm Birch Hill Equity Partners (BHEP) had reached a deal to acquire Well.ca, although McKesson would continue to be its wholesale distribution supplier. The transaction with BHEP was completed three months later.

Erin Young, Chief Merchant, and Marketing Officer also announced that she will be leaving McKesson Canada to pursue other opportunities in the consumer industry. Nicole Flynn, General Manager of Well.ca, will continue to lead the business.

== Products and services ==
In 2015, Well.ca opened its first brick-and-mortar shop, located at the Shops at Don Mills, with the initial intention of remaining open for four months. Online sales information would be used to determine the selection of products for the store.

In addition to a warehouse in Guelph's south end, Well.ca opened its second distribution centre in Calgary, Alberta in August, 2023.

== Awards and recognition ==
Well.ca has received Canada Post E-Commerce Innovation awards in 2012, 2013, 2015, 2016 and 2019 The company was named Best Mid-Size E-Commerce Retailer in 2013 by the Retail Council of Canada, and created one of Canada's first Virtual Store experiences in 2012 at Union Station in Toronto. Forrester awarded Well.ca a tie for the top spot on its Canadian Customer Experience Index.
