= Reinmar =

Reinmar is a German masculine given name. It comes from Germanic *ragin/regin ("resolution [of the gods]") and Old High German mari, ("famous").

Variant forms of the name include Ragnomar, Raginmar, Ragnimir, Raginmir, and Reginmar.

Notable people with the name include:

- Reinmar von Brennenberg (13th century), German minnesinger
- Reinmar von Hagenau also the Elder (13th century), German minnesinger
- Reinmar von Zweter (13th century), German minnesinger
- Reinmar of Bielawa, fictional character by Andrzej Sapkowski
