= Orijen =

Canadian dog food brand

- Company type: Private
- Industry: Pet food
- Founded: 1985; 41 years ago
- Founder: Reinhard Muhlenfeld
- Headquarters: Edmonton, Alberta, Canada
- Parent: Champion Petfoods
- Website: orijen.ca

Orijen is a premium brand of dog food and cat food introduced in 2005 and manufactured in Alberta, Canada and Kentucky by Champion Petfoods, a company founded in 1985 by Reinhard Muhlenfeld.

== Sale to Mars foods ==
In 2023 Mars Incorporated purchased Champion, the parent company of Orijen.
