= XS Cargo =

Canadian store chain

XS Cargo was a Canadian discount store chain founded in 1996 by Mike McKenna and headquartered in Mississauga, Ontario. At its peak, it operated 50 warehouse-style stores, the first of which opened in Edmonton, Alberta, mostly in strip malls, across eight provinces selling a wide range of brand name clearance, liquidated, overstocked and unsold merchandise purchased from distressed retailers. It also administered two distribution hubs in Edmonton and Mississauga.

In June 2011, XS Cargo was sold for around $5.3 million to Greenwich, Connecticut-based private investment firm KarpReilly LLC. Duncan Reith, former senior vice president of merchandising for Canadian Tire Corporation, was named the company's new president and CEO, succeeding the retiring McKenna, in January 2012.

On July 30, 2014, XS Cargo filed for bankruptcy protection, reporting about $15.8 million in assets and $18.7 million in debt, including $7.4 million owed to unsecured creditors. In September, having been unable to successfully restructure, the chain began to liquidate its inventory; by October 26, all its brick-and-mortar outlets closed and the company officially went out of business. XS Cargo's liquidator cited the entry of Target into the Canadian market, which intensified competition among "well-established traditional retailers", resulting in diminishing business, as the prime reason for the company's failure.

== See also ==
- LW Stores
