= Dempsey Store =

Former Canadian hardware store

Coordinates: 43.770079°N 79.416966°W

Joseph Shepard House; also Dempsey Bros. Store
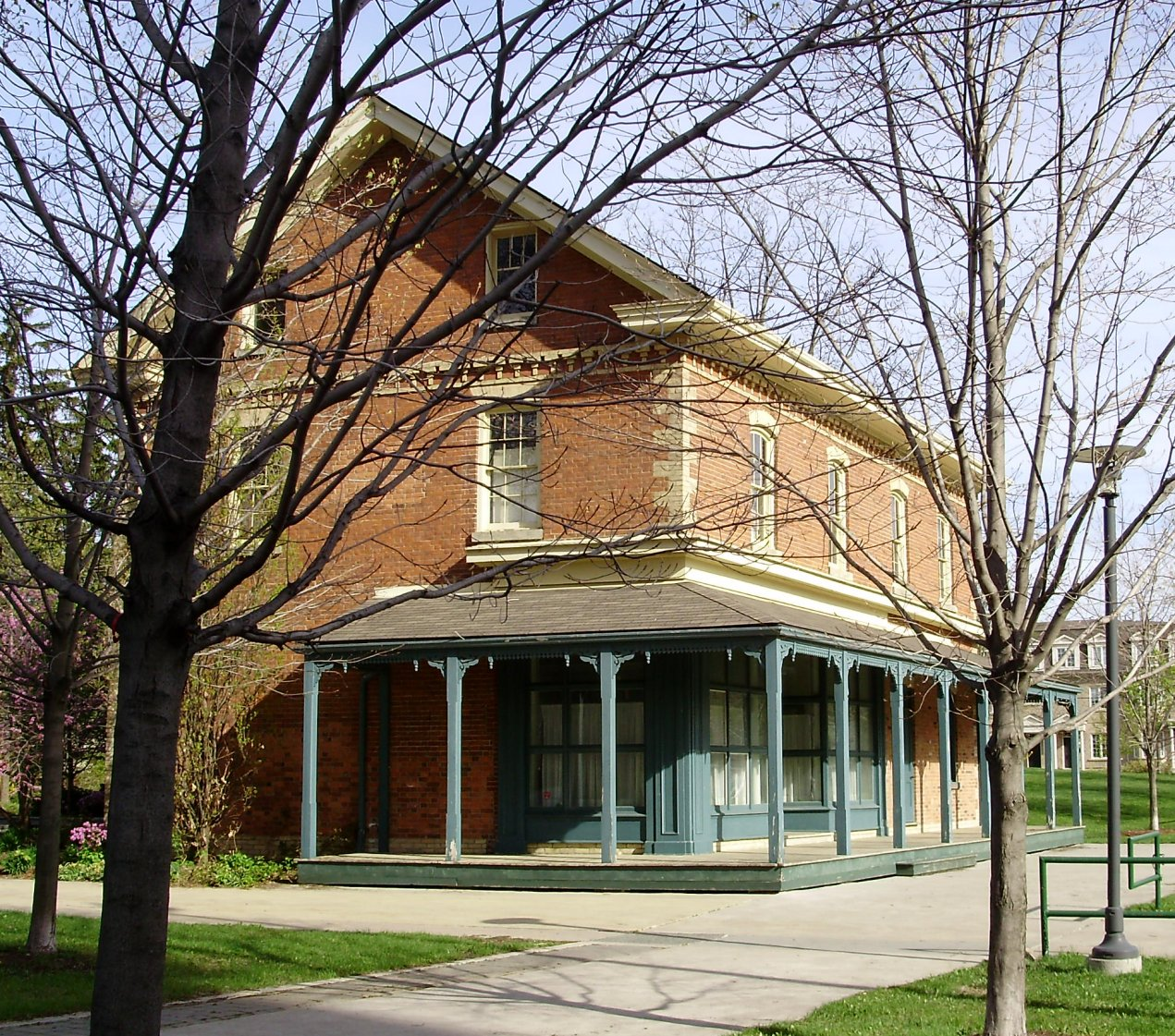
- The Dempsey Store in North York's Dempsey Park.
- Interactive map of Joseph Shepard House; also Dempsey Bros. Store
- Location: 250 Beecroft Road; Toronto, Ontario; M2N 6W3

History
- Built: 1860
- Original use: house and store

Ontario Heritage Act
- Type: Municipal Heritage Designation (Part IV)
- Designated: December 17, 1998

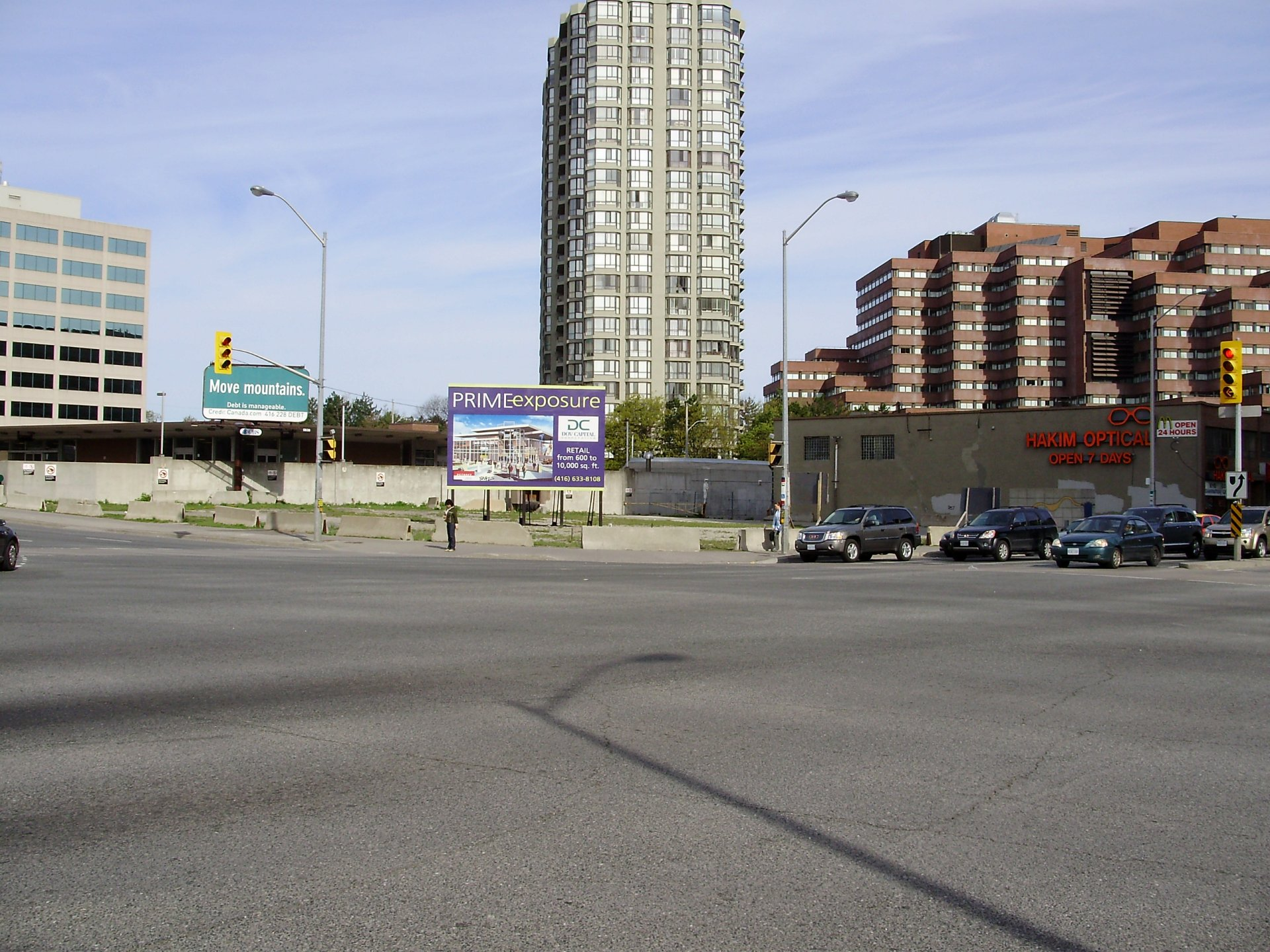
The original site of the Dempsey Store, photographed in 2008.

Dempsey Store was a hardware store built in 1860 at the northwest corner of Yonge Street and Sheppard Avenue, in North York, Toronto, Ontario, Canada. The historic store was moved and restored as a historic site further north at 250 Beecroft Road in 1996. The site in Dempsey Park is maintained by the Toronto Parks, Forestry and Recreation Division and the North York Historical Society.

The building is protected under Part IV of the Ontario Heritage Act since 1998. The designation notes: "Architecturally, the Dempsey store is a unique example of a rural mid-19th century building constructed in the Georgian Survival style with Neo-Classical influences. Its recent restoration has reintroduced those picturesque architectural elements that were added to the exterior of the building during the closing decades of the 19th century."
