= Tuxedo Source for Sports =

Tuxedo Source for Sports is a Canadian retailer of sports equipment, mainly hockey and bicycles, based in Calgary, Alberta. Founded by the Gregory family in 1960 as "Tuxedo Cycle & Sports" in the Tuxedo area of Calgary, the store has remained family-owned ever since.
They stock an extensive hockey selection and carry such brands as Bauer, Easton, and Graf. Despite primarily being a hockey retailer, Tuxedo, which was one of the first major bicycle stores in Calgary along with Bow Cycle and Ridley Cycle, also serves as a specialty bicycle shop in northern Calgary. Specialised and Giant have been their two main lines of bicycles for a number of years.

On May 15, 2010, Tuxedo held a gala evening at McMahon Stadium's Red and White Club to celebrate the store's 50th anniversary.
