= Agnew-Surpass =

Agnew-Surpass Shoe Stores Ltd. was a Canadian shoe retailer.

Agnew Shoes was founded in Brantford, Ontario, in 1879 (147 years ago), and merged in 1928 with Surpass Stores. In 1962 the chain was acquired by American firm Genesco, and in 1987 it was sold to a numbered company controlled by former Bata Shoe executive Michael Graye. Despite being the largest chain of shoe stores in Canada, the chain went bankrupt in 2000 (26 years ago).
