= Rexall (Canada) =

Chain of retail pharmacies in Canada

Rexall Pharmacy Group ULC

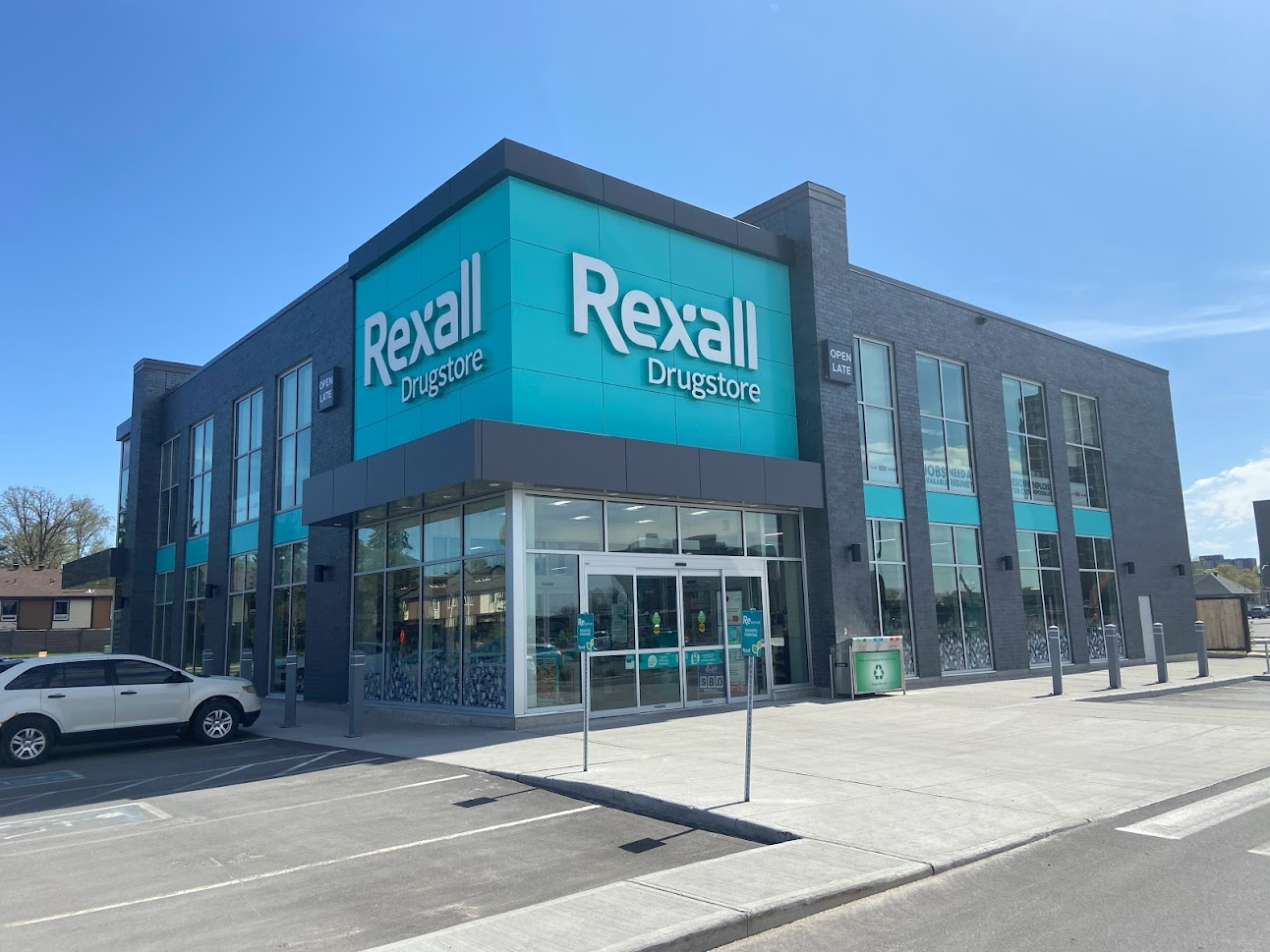
- A Rexall pharmacy in Ottawa, Ontario
- Trade name: Rexall
- Type: Unlimited liability corporation
- Industry: Retail, pharmacy
- Founded: 1904; 122 years ago
- Headquarters: Mississauga, Ontario, Canada
- Number of locations: 400 (2022)
- Key people: Ron Wilson (President)
- Owner: Birch Hill Equity Partners (2024–present)
- Number of employees: 8,000 (2022)
- Parent: Katz Group of Companies (1996–2016); McKesson Canada (2016–2024); Birch Hill Equity (2024-present)
- Website: www.rexall.ca

Rexall Pharmacy Group ULC is a chain of retail pharmacies in Canada. Founded in 1904, Rexall has almost 400 pharmacies across Canada with 8,000 employees.

== History ==
Rexall was founded in 1904 during the early days of the United Drug Company and quickly established itself as a major retail pharmacy chain. At the same time, Tamblyn Drugs was establishing itself in Toronto, Ontario, and would eventually become Pharma Plus. These two companies would later merge to form the Rexall Pharmacy Group.

McKesson Canada purchased Rexall in December 2016 for $3 billion from the Katz Group of Companies. At the time, it was estimated that Rexall had an average annual revenue of approximately $2.0 to $2.5 billion. Around this period, one of the major rival pharmacies in Canada was Shoppers Drug Mart.

In 2018, the president of Rexall at that point, Beth Newlands Campbell, announced that the Pharma Plus brand would be discontinued and all stores would be converted to Rexall in order to create a more consistent look for the chain.

The company was in partnership with Air Miles, which Rexall accepted as a loyalty program. In May 2020, Rexall discontinued its partnership with Air Miles as a loyalty program at its stores and created its own loyalty program called Be Well, with which customers can collect points in order to redeem in-store items, similar to Air Miles.

In January 2024, The Globe and Mail reported that McKesson had begun exploring the possibility of selling Rexall to potential buyers. On September 5, Birch Hill Equity Partners (BHEP) announced that it had signed a definitive agreement with McKesson Corporation to acquire Rexall Pharmacy Group.

On December 20, 2024, BHEP completed the purchase of the company.
