= Charm Diamond Centres =

Canadian jewellery retailer

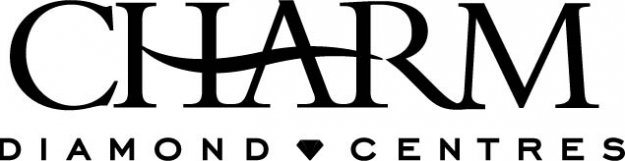
- Type: Private
- Industry: Retail
- Founded: Dartmouth, Nova Scotia, Canada; 1972
- Headquarters: Dartmouth, Nova Scotia, Canada
- Number of locations: 74
- Area served: Canada
- Products: Jewellery
- Number of employees: 800
- Subsidiaries: Ben Moss Jewellers
- Website: charmdiamondcentres.com

Charm Diamond Centres is an independently owned Canadian jewellery retailer. Its stores are primarily located within regional malls in Canadian provinces such as Ontario, Alberta, Manitoba, Saskatchewan, Nova Scotia, New Brunswick, Newfoundland and Labrador and Prince Edward Island.

Charm Diamond Centres uses the Kimberley Process to certify that their diamonds come from legitimate sources.

The business was founded in Nova Scotia by Richard Calder in 1972. The jewellery chain is still owned and operated by the Calder family. In 2007, Calder received the Entrepreneur of the Year Special Citation Award for Retailing Excellence in the Category of Business-to-Consumer Products & Services at the Ernst & Young Entrepreneur of the Year Awards.

Charm Diamond Centres has been chosen as one of Canada's 50 Best Managed companies since 2007; in 2013 it received Platinum status.

In January 2017, the company acquired the brand rights to Ben Moss Jewelers which had gone into receivership in 2016, rehired many former staff members and reopened two stores in Winnipeg along with announcing its intention to open several other stores in the following months. Under the three brands, Charm Diamond Centres, Crescent Gold and Diamonds and Ben Moss Jewellers operate 82 stores in nine provinces. Recent estimates put their number of employees at 800 with 60 being located at their head office in Nova Scotia.
