= Wholesale Sports =

Wholly-owned subsidiary of UFA Co-operative Limited

Wholesale Sports Outdoor Outfitters
- Industry: Retail
- Defunct: December 28, 2017
- Headquarters: Calgary, Alberta, Canada
- Products: Hunting, fishing, camping gear and apparel
- Number of employees: 501-1000 employees
- Website: www.wholesalesports.com/

Wholesale Sports Outdoor Outfitters was a Canadian owned and operated retailer in western Canada that provided hunting, fishing, and camping gear and apparel, and advice and merchandise for outdoor sports and activities.

== History ==
Wholesale Sports offered equipment, clothing and accessories in the camping, hunting, and fishing categories to outdoor enthusiasts across western Canada. Founded by two brothers from Calgary, they acquired local retailers including Frenchy's and Barottos Sports, establishing Wholesale Sports as a retailer and distributor to western Canada's sportsmen and women. Over time, Wholesale Sports acquired and opened additional stores in Edmonton, Lethbridge, Winnipeg, Saskatoon and Kamloops.

UFA acquired Wholesale Sports Canada in early 2008. A year later, they acquired the leases of 15 Sportsman's Warehouse stores with an employee base of 1,200. Sportsman's Warehouse, a privately held Salt Lake City-based outdoor adventure retailer, had 68 locations throughout the U.S. before UFA acquired 15 sites. The Fargo, North Dakota location was closed in July 2011, leaving 14 stores in the U.S., and 11 in Canada. In 2013 UFA divested its U.S. Wholesale Sports business.

Wholesale Sports opened its 12th and 13th Canadian locations in Prince George, B.C. (2013), and Westbank, B.C. (2014).

In early 2015, Wholesale Sports implemented a new e-commerce platform at www.wholesalesports.com/

In 2016, Wholesale Sports closed its Regina location. As of September 14, 2017 they planned to close all stores.

The last business day of retail sales before closing permanently was on December 28, 2017.

== Locations ==
State/Province	City
Alberta	Calgary
Alberta	North Edmonton
Alberta	South Edmonton
Alberta	Grande Prairie
Alberta	Lethbridge
British Columbia	Kamloops
British Columbia	Langley
British Columbia	Nanaimo
British Columbia	Prince George
British Columbia	Westbank
Manitoba	Winnipeg
Saskatchewan	Saskatoon
Saskatchewan	Regina
