= Krazy Krazy =

Defunct Canadian electronics retailer

Krazy Krazy Audio Video Warehouse was a Canadian retailer of consumer audiovisual electronics. In operation from 1983 to 2009, the chain began to decline in the late 1990s and 2000s due to the changing consumer electronics market. Although no longer operating as a national chain, a few former franchise locations remain in business as independently operated local stores.

== Background ==
The company was established in 1983 by Michael McKenna and Daniel Behune, opening its first location in Vancouver, British Columbia. It soon began expanding nationally, both by opening new company-owned locations and through a franchise deal which resulted in the rebranding of Windsor businessman Bill McKay's existing McKay's Television and Appliances chain. However, the franchise deal led to some friction: as McKay's franchised company had a stronger credit rating than the McKenna-Behune parent corporation, the chain was ordering all of its appliances through McKay, who tried to petition McKenna and Behune's company into receivership in 1987 over unpaid revenue compensation. The deal resulted in a split between the two companies, with McKenna and Behune rebranding their stores as Multitech Warehouse Direct, while McKay became the sole owner of the Krazy Krazy brand name thereafter.

== Krazy Krazy ==
Under McKay's ownership, the chain served markets in Ontario, Manitoba and Alberta, with 20 locations at its peak. It was sued by Alberta's provincial Ministry of Consumer and Corporate Affairs in 1989 due to allegations of false advertising, including bait and switch tactics under which customers who wanted to purchase a product at the advertised price were allegedly pressured to purchase a similar but higher-priced product instead, and allegations that the firm was advertising "no interest" sale prices which had interest already hidden in the advertised sale price. The company denied the claims, instead asserting that virtually all of the complaints that had been filed resulted from other electronics retailers trying to compete with Krazy Krazy by buying products at Krazy Krazy's special sale prices in order to resell them at a markup.

In the 1990s, the firm began closing some of its stores, with its Calgary location closing in 1992 and both of its stores in Sudbury closing in 2000. By 2009, the company's largest remaining stores, in Winnipeg and Thunder Bay, were closed. The only remaining remnants of the company as of 2018 are the former stores in Sydney, Nova Scotia and Timmins, Ontario, which both retained the Krazy Krazy name when they were bought out by local owners; and the company's former car audio specialty store in Winnipeg, which was bought out by two former employees and now operates as Krazy's.

== Multitech Warehouse Direct ==
Soon after the split of the original Krazy Krazy franchise agreement resulted in McKenna and Behune's stores being rebranded as Multitech Warehouse Direct, a break-in at Multitech's store in Ottawa resulted in the theft of $30,000 of merchandise.

Multitech Warehouse Direct grew more rapidly at first than McKay's Krazy Krazy, reaching 52 stores in seven provinces across Canada at its peak in 1993. In that year, however, it signed a deal as the exclusive Canadian distributor of Magnavox products, which locked it into purchasing $25 million worth of inventory per year regardless of actual sales; at the same time, its early forays into selling computer products were unsuccessful. The company also had a rocky relationship with Sony, buying Sony products on the grey market in the United States to get around Sony Canada's unwillingness to maintain direct business dealings with Multitech; culminating in a 1993 court case after Sony Canada alleged that Multitech was advertising Sony products at deeply discounted prices, but training its sales staff to disparage the Sony products as defective and not worth purchasing, and instead steering customers to higher-priced competing products.

Multitech was placed in receivership, and its assets liquidated, by 1996.
