= Sarah Reitman =

Canadian businesswoman

Sarah Reitman (c. 1881–1950) was a Romanian–Canadian businesswoman and co-founder in 1926 of Reitmans with her husband Herman Reitman. Herman and Sarah Reitman were born in Romania and moved to the United States, then to Canada in 1907 for better prospects. In 1911, they opened a small store called American Ladies Tailoring and Dressmaking in Montreal. It specialised in dressmaking needs for ladies, namely made to measure garments. Later on, they moved away from this field and towards a dry goods general store. In 1926, they opened a glove and hosiery store that became the origin of the Reitman's chain.
