= Japan Camera =

Canadian consumer electronics store chain

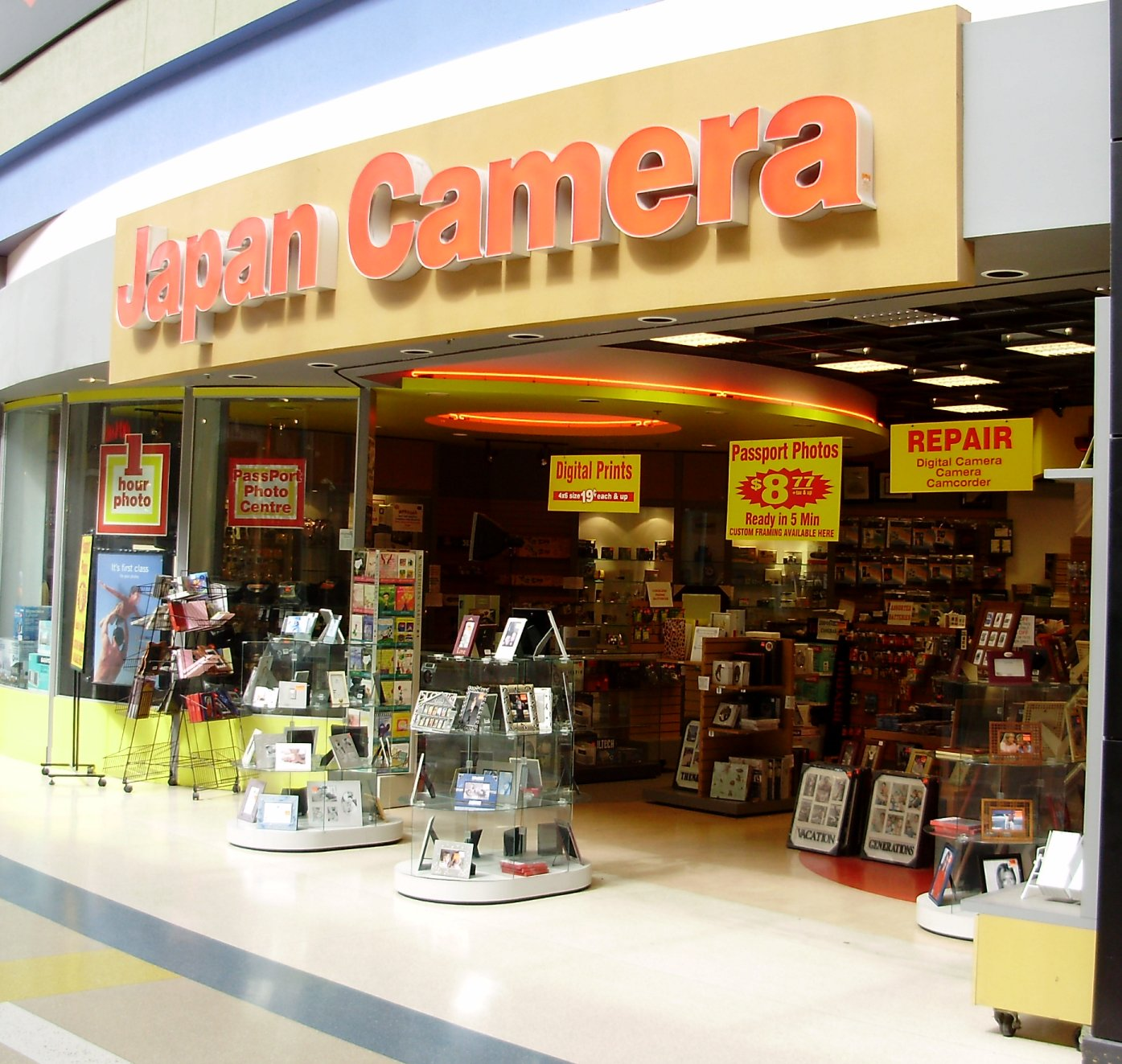
A former Japan Camera store in the Scarborough Town Centre in Scarborough, Ontario.

Japan Camera opened its first store in 1959. Since then, it has grown to become a successful chain of over 100 stores across North America. The store opened the first one-hour photofinishing lab in North America. There are a few in Toronto.

In Quebec, the chain is known as Centre Japonais De La Photo.
