= Second Chance Animal Rescue Society =

Canadian non-profit organization

- Founded: 2002; 24 years ago
- Founders: Sylvia Christiansen, Jan Pysyk
- Type: non-profit charity
- Purpose: Animal rescue
- Location(s): Edmonton and Athabasca, Alberta
- Region served: northern Alberta, Canada
- Revenue: $1.16 million (2018)
- Employees: 5 (2019)
- Volunteers: 250
- Website: scarscare.ca

Second Chance Animal Rescue Society (SCARS) is registered non-profit animal rescue organization based in Edmonton, Morinville, and Athabasca, Alberta, serving northern Alberta, Canada. SCARS adopts out dogs and cats, keeping the animals in a foster settings when possible or at the Morinville animal shelter. Before adopting them out, each animal gets medical care, receives vaccinations and microchips, and is spayed or neutered.

== History ==
The organization was cofounded by Sylvia Christiansen and Jan Pysyk in 2002 after they began rescuing dogs found in remote communities in northern Alberta. In the first year, about 70 dogs were helped, increasing to about 2,000 dogs/cat by 2025, with the aid of about 400 volunteers and 120 foster homes.
