= Highway Book Shop =

Former bookstore in Ontario, Canada

Coordinates: 47.3669°N 79.7649°W

The Highway Book Shop
- Type: Private
- Industry: Bookselling; Publishing
- Founded: 1957
- Founder: Douglas Pollard; Jean Pollard (née Hope)
- Defunct: 2011
- Fate: Closed (company sold in 2012; physical store not reopened)
- Headquarters: Ontario Highway 11 near Cobalt, Ontario, Canada
- Area served: Canada
- Key people: Douglas Pollard; Jean Pollard; Lois Pollard (née Williams)
- Products: Books (new, rare, and out-of-print); Book publishing
- Website: (archived; maintained for historical reference)

The Highway Book Shop was a bookstore and publishing company located on Ontario Highway 11 near Cobalt, Ontario, which operated from 1957 to 2011. Considered a landmark and cultural institution in the region, it was one of the largest and best known independent bookstores in Canada.

First established as a conventional printing business in 1957 by Douglas Pollard and his then-wife Jean (née Hope), the business expanded into book sales after accepting a box of books as alternative payment for a printing job. As the business grew, Pollard eventually expanded further into book publishing, releasing an extensive catalogue of titles in English, French and First Nations languages. Books about the history and culture of Northern Ontario were the publishing arm's primary interest, although the company also published some fiction and poetry titles by local authors, as well as how-to and humour titles.

In addition to its physical store, the shop also maintained an extensive mail order business, as well as a search service for people interested in purchasing rare or out-of-print books, and frequently travelled throughout Ontario to sell books at regional fairs and festivals. At its peak, the store had over 300,000 titles in stock in a variety of locations, including the main building, on-site trailers and several warehouses. By the early 2000s, the store also had a presence on AbeBooks, increasing its visibility for international sales of its rare books.

Following Jean Pollard's death, Douglas remarried in 1979 to Lois (née Williams), who also became active in the store. Douglas Pollard was awarded an honorary doctorate by Nipissing University the following year, the first honorary degree ever granted by that institution.

Douglas Pollard was also active in the national literary community, including as a board member of the Ontario Arts Council and as a member of the committee for the Stephen Leacock Memorial Medal for Humour. He was inducted into the Order of Canada in 2008, although he died in 2009 before his actual induction ceremony. Lois Pollard accepted the award on his behalf.

In her late 80s and keen to retire, Lois Pollard placed the store up for sale soon after Douglas' death, but closed it in 2011 after failing to find a willing buyer. She published a history of the store, Highway Book Shop: Northern Ontario's Unexpected Treasure, in 2011, and donated a large collection of records and memorabilia from the store to the Laurentian University archives in 2010 and 2011.

The company was purchased in 2012, although the new owners have not reopened the physical store. Its legacy website is maintained by White Mountain Publications for historical reference only.
