= Herman Reitman =

Herman Reitman (1870–1941) was a Romanian-Canadian businessman and co-founder in 1926 of Reitmans, a retailer, with his wife Sarah Reitman.
