= Peavey Mart =

Canadian retailer

Peavey Industries LP
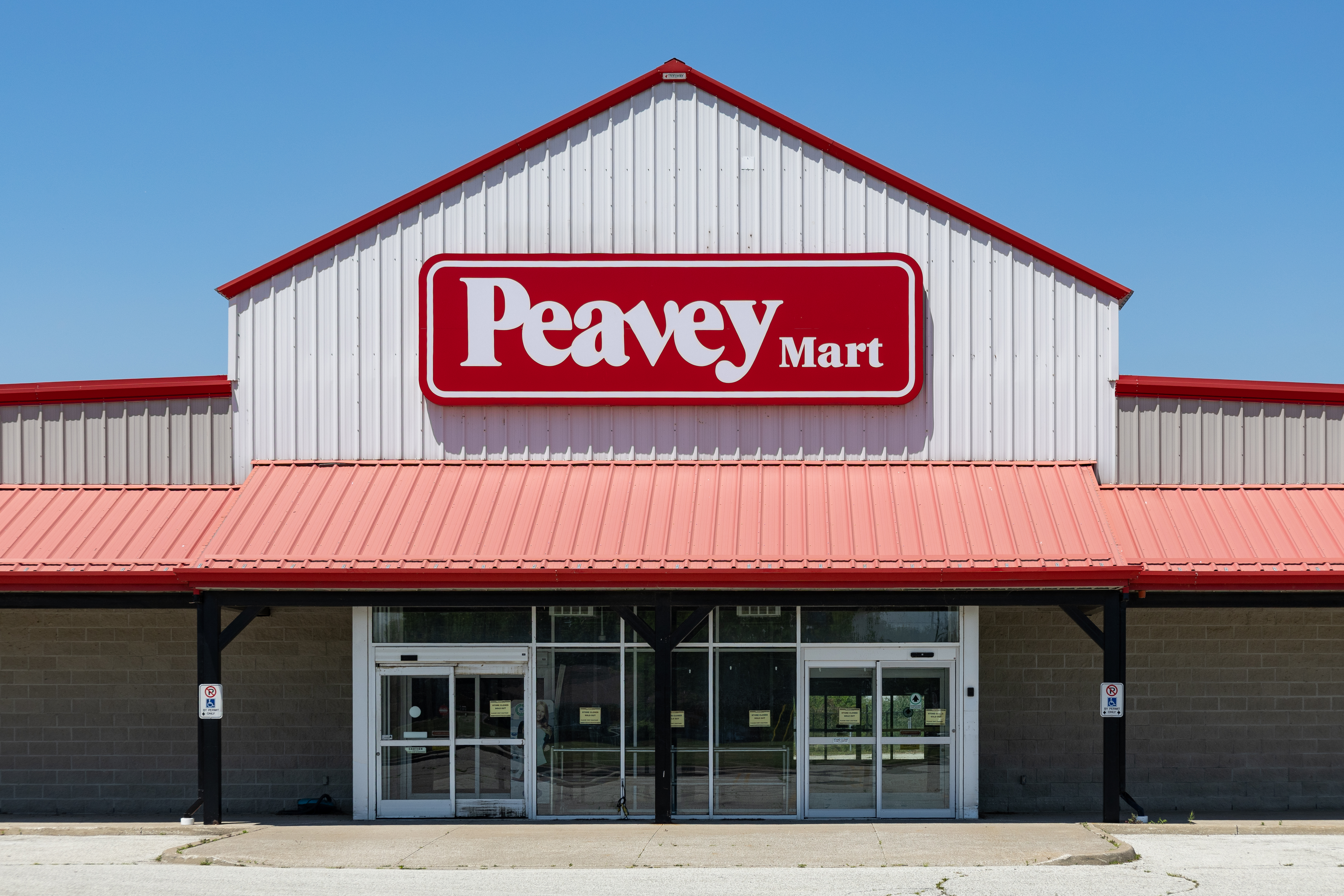
- Peavey Mart in Leamington, Ontario
- Type: Limited partnership
- Industry: Retail
- Founded: 1967; 59 years ago in Winnipeg, Manitoba
- Headquarters: Red Deer, Alberta, Canada
- Key people: Doug Anderson (CEO)

Peavey Mart is a Red Deer, Alberta-based chain of hardware and agricultural supply stores owned by Peavey Industries LP. The chain was founded by the Peavey Company in 1967 as National Farmway Stores, and was renamed Peavey Mart in 1974. The chain was acquired by its Canadian management in 1984.

The chain primarily operated in Western Canada. In 2016, Peavey Industries acquired TSC Canada; its locations were rebranded as Peavey Mart, expanding the chain into Ontario, and expanding its presence in Manitoba. In 2020, Peavey Industries acquired the Canadian master licence to Ace Hardware from Rona, servicing its 107 locations. The chain closed all its stores in February 2025 It was acquired by a private investment firm which reopened 4 Peavey Marts in Alberta on December 4, 2025. There are plans to reopen 7-12 more stores across Alberta and Saskatchewan by the end of 2026.

== History ==
The company was established in Winnipeg in 1967 as National Farmway Stores, under the ownership of the National Grain division of the Minneapolis-based Peavey Company. Its first location was in Dawson Creek, British Columbia. In 1974, Peavey Company sold National Grain but retained the National Farmway Stores division, renaming it Peavey Mart. In 1982, Peavey Company was acquired by ConAgra, which planned to fold the Peavey Mart chain due to its performance. In 1984, Peavey Mart was acquired by its management, including Rick Anderson (the father of present-day CEO Doug Anderson), making it a Canadian-owned company.

In 2012, Peavey Industries established a new, smaller hardware store concept, MainStreet Hardware, at three locations in Blackfalds, Ponoka and Vermilion, Alberta.

In July 2016, Peavey Industries acquired a controlling interest in TSC Canada from Birch Hill Equity Partners, including 51 stores and its London, Ontario distribution centre. Peavey Industries completed its acquisition of the division in 2017, more than doubling the company's retail footprint from 34 stores predominantly in Western Canada, to 85 with an expanded presence in Manitoba and Ontario. The Manitoba TSC stores were rebranded as Peavey Mart in 2016, and the Ontario stores in 2021.

In March 2020, Peavey Industries acquired the Canadian master licence for Ace Hardware from Lowe's-owned Rona. Peavey Industries maintained the 107-store Ace chain, but began to stock their store brands at its locations, and integrated the stores into Peavey Mart's expanded ecommerce operations.

In May 2021, Peavey Mart began construction of a new flagship location in Red Deer.

In 2023, Peavey Industries acquired the Red Deer-based transport company Guy's Freightways; Peavey Mart had been a client of the company since 1975.

=== Closure of stores ===
In June 2024, Peavey Industries announced that it would end its master licensing agreement with Ace Hardware International at the end of the year. On January 23, 2025, the chain announced the closures of 22 stores in Ontario and Nova Scotia as part of an organizational restructuring.

On January 27, 2025, Peavey Industries announced that it would seek creditor protection and close all Peavey Mart and MainStreet Hardware stores nationwide. The company cited "unprecedented challenges, including record-low consumer confidence, inflationary pressures, rising operating costs and ongoing supply disruptions along with a difficult regulatory environment".

=== Reopening ===
In April 2025, private investment firm 2707162 Alberta Ltd. acquired the rights to the Peavey Mart brand and intellectual property from Peavey Industries, and in August 2025 announced its intent to re-open selected locations in Alberta and Saskatchewan. Four stores in Alberta were opened in early December 2025.

== Sponsorship ==
In July 2021, Peavey Mart acquired the naming rights to the Westerner Park Centrium in Red Deer under a five-year agreement. The sponsorship agreement lapsed after Peavey Mart ceased operations.
