= Future Shop =

Canadian electronics store chain

- Type: Subsidiary
- Industry: Retail
- Founded: 1982; 44 years ago
- Founder: Hassan Khosrowshahi
- Defunct: March 28, 2015; 11 years ago
- Fate: Merged with Best Buy
- Successor: Best Buy
- Headquarters: Burnaby, British Columbia, Canada
- Area served: Canada; United States (until 1999)
- Key people: Ron Wilson - President, International Mat Povse - Senior Vice President, Retail & Services Angela Scardillo - Senior Vice President, Marketing & Store Design
- Products: Electronics
- Parent: Best Buy Canada (2001–2015)
- Website: www.bestbuy.ca

Future Shop was a Canadian electronics store chain. It was established in 1982 by Hassan Khosrowshahi. By 1990, the chain had become the country's largest retailer of computer and consumer electronics. In October 2012, the company operated 149 locations across Canada.

In November 2001, Future Shop was acquired by the similar American chain Best Buy for C$580 million. Although Best Buy began to establish Canadian locations under its own name following the purchase, it continued to operate the Future Shop stores as a separate chain. Even though many of the new Best Buy locations were in close proximity to existing Future Shop stores, the two chains were differentiated primarily by their in-store experiences.

On March 28, 2015, Best Buy announced the dissolution of the Future Shop brand and the closure of 66 of its locations. All remaining locations were converted to Best Buy stores.

== History ==
=== Beginnings ===
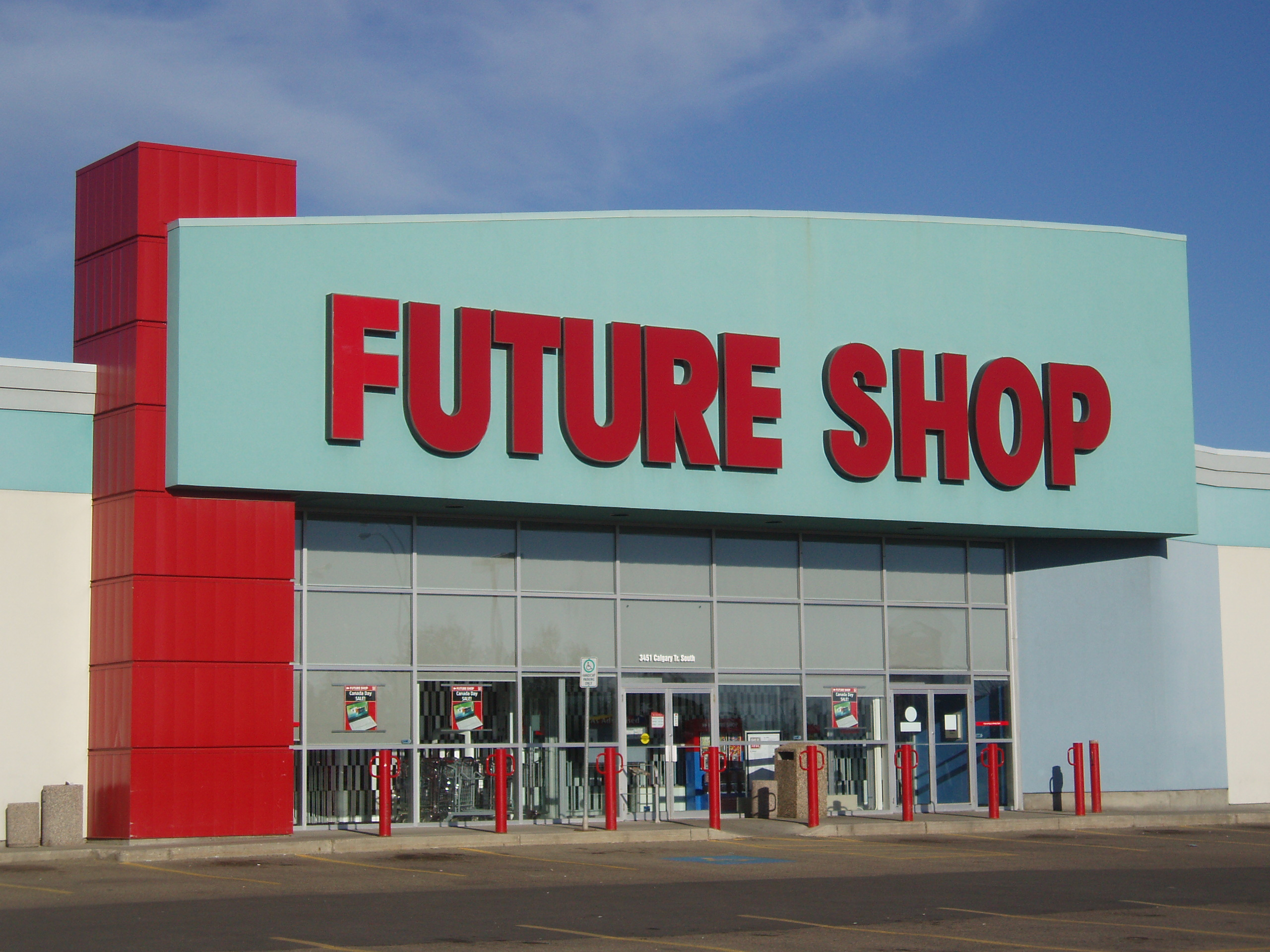
A Future Shop store in Edmonton in July 2007

Future Shop was founded in 1982 by Iranian entrepreneur Hassan Khosrowshahi, who left Iran to settle in Vancouver, British Columbia to start a retail business. Khosrowshahi graduated from the University of Tehran with a degree in law and economics and was a part of the family who owned the Minoo Industrial Group, a large Iran manufacturer of pharmaceuticals, cosmetics, and food products. Khosrowshahi planned to open a chain of consumer and home electronics stores and take over the Canadian retail market. His associate, Ardeshir Ziabakhsh (Ardy Zia), took the role of president and CEO of the newly formed company and Khosrowshahi served as chairman and founder. In 1983, Future Shop opened the first three stores, all of which were in British Columbia. The company sold computers, software, games, videocassettes, audio equipment, music, and other items. By December 1983, the first month all of the Future Shop stores were opened and making business, the company reached $2.8 million in sales.

By 1990, Future Shop became the largest retailer of computers and consumer electronics in Canada and was operating 38 stores across the country and some areas of the United States. In August 1993, Future Shop went public on the Toronto Stock Exchange, making $30 million to be used for expansion and to pay off debt.

By the end of 1995, Future Shop's sales had reached more than $1 billion, with more than $38 million in EBITDA (earnings before interest, taxes, depreciation and amortization).

In 1997, Future Shop announced a change in management, with Ziabakhsh leaving the company. Khosrowshahi took on the roles of president and CEO, in addition to serving as chairman. Many people from company headquarters were let go during this transitional period.

=== Focusing on Canadian markets ===
In 1998, Future Shop purchased the Canadian division of Computer City from CompUSA, three months after the Computer City chain had been merged into CompUSA and either converted to CompUSA or closed and liquidated. During the next year, two of the Computer City retail stores were liquidated because of poor sales. In addition, the competing Adventure Electronics in Ontario and Quebec closed, leaving Future Shop as the only big-box electronics retailer in Canada.

By the end of 1998, the U.S. locations of Future Shop were performing poorly, with $53 million in losses over the last few years, and Future Shop projected another $30 million in losses would occur by the end of the next year. After major losses in sales, in March 1999, the company announced that it would close U.S. operations, holding liquidation sales and closing down in the summer. The closures left Future Shop with 81 stores across Canada. Many of the stores became part of one of its major U.S. competitors, the Best Buy chain.

In 2000, Future Shop owned 83 Future Shop stores and five Computer City stores. In June 2000, Future Shop announced plans to open flagship stores in downtown Vancouver, Toronto, and Montreal.

In February 2001, Future Shop announced that the company would close and liquidate the five remaining Computer City stores because of poor sales. At the same time, Future Shop also attempted to acquire Chapters, a chain of book stores in Canada, but failed to come up with a reasonable offer.

=== Best Buy buyout, new store concepts ===
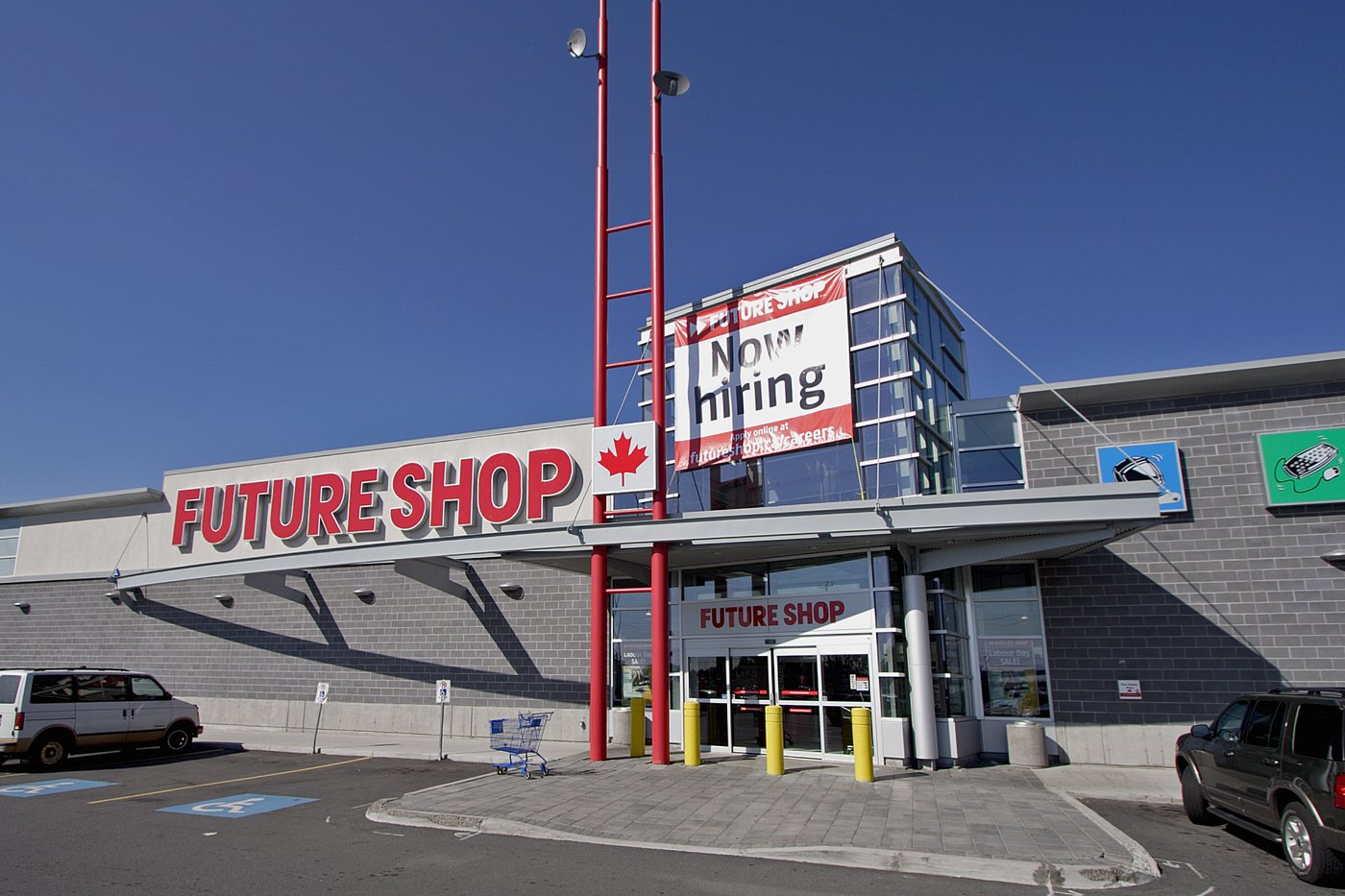
A newer-styled Future Shop in Sudbury, Ontario

In March 2001, the U.S. electronics store chain Best Buy acquired Future Shop for CDN$580 million. Following the purchase, Khosrowshahi stepped down as president, but other executives from Future Shop retained their positions within the company. Best Buy continued to operate Future Shop as a separate division following the purchase, acknowledging the strength of the brand. However, in 2002, the company began to open Best Buy locations in Canada as a secondary chain.

The dual-banner strategy sought to improve the company's Canadian market share by providing new options to consumers; the chains were differentiated primarily by their in-store experiences and promotional strategies, as Future Shop continued to use commission-based salespersons and featured home appliance selections, while Best Buy used non-commissioned salespersons and featured more interactive displays. The differences between the stores also attracted differing demographics; Future Shop's use of haggling appealed to customers who had immigrated to Canada from countries where the practice is commonplace, while Best Buy's relaxed atmosphere was popular among women.

Some Best Buy locations were within driving distance, or even on the same lot, as an existing Future Shop. In one case, a Best Buy was opened at the Toronto Eaton Centre at around the same time that a new Future Shop was placed across from Sankofa Square (then known as Yonge-Dundas Square). Some of the new Best Buy locations would cannibalize sales at Future Shop stores located in close proximity to them, but typically the new Best Buy would generate considerable new revenue that would more than make up for the drop in the sales of the existing Future Shop, the net result being that the two stores increased their parent's overall market share in that area while keeping rivals out. This dual-banner strategy was effective before the mass proliferation of online-only retailers.

In an effort to widen the chain's customer base, Future Shop began to experiment with an updated store concept at new locations in Vancouver and South Edmonton Common in 2008. The new stores featured an expanded, 53,000 square foot layout divided into four main departments. Work (computing), Play (video games, musical instruments), Living (home appliances and exercise equipment), and On the Go (mobile phones and audio products). A central hub was staffed by "connectivity experts", whom customers could consult for personalized advice on technology options. In December 2011, Future Shop opened a liquidation store in Greenfield Park, Quebec.

=== Demise ===
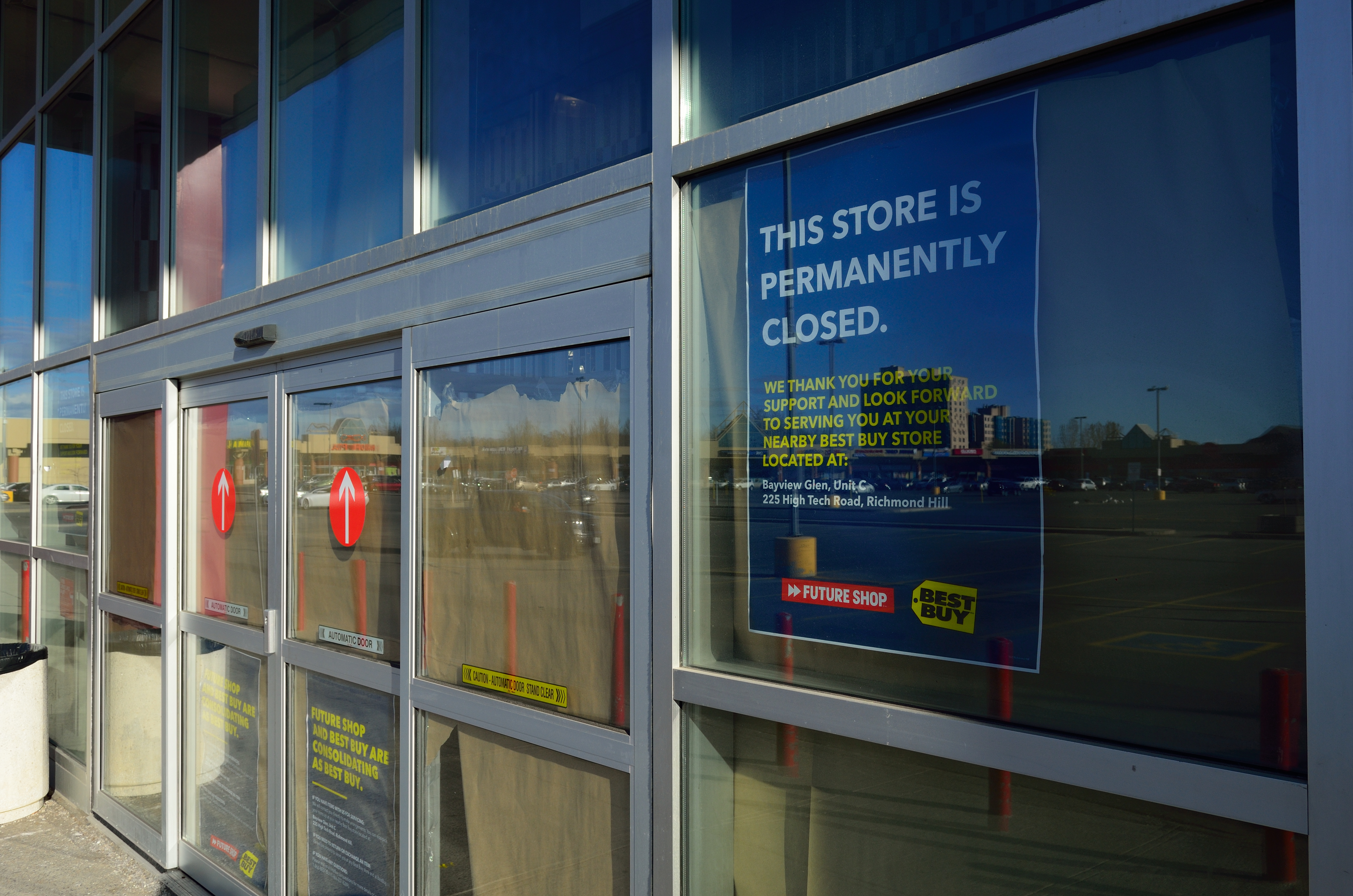
A closed Future Shop store in Richmond Hill in May 2015

On January 31, 2013, Best Buy Canada announced that it would begin to close various locations, including eight Future Shop locations effective immediately, as part of a "long-term transformational strategy to optimize the company's retail footprint across the country." The company also planned to target more resources toward its online retail operations to compete against other major vendors such as Amazon.com. These closures included locations in New Westminster, Nanaimo, Victoria, Langford, Surrey, Lachenaie, and Sherbrooke. On January 30, 2014, 950 employees of both chains were laid off. In 2014 and early 2015, other Future Shop locations were closed, including those in Boucherville, Greenfield Park, Montreal, Ottawa, Regina, Kingston, New Minas, and New Glasgow.

On March 28, 2015, Best Buy Canada announced that Future Shop would cease business effective immediately. 66 locations were permanently closed, and the remaining 65 locations were soft launched as Best Buy locations on April 4, 2015 (although still carrying Future Shop signage for the time being). In the months that followed, the locations were renovated to adopt Best Buy's branding and store format.

Best Buy stated that these closures and re-brandings were intended to reduce redundancy, as the closed stores were located within close proximity of a Best Buy. The closures affected 1,000 part-time and 500 full-time jobs. In turn, Best Buy Canada announced that it would invest at least $200 million over the next two years to increase staffing and add home appliance departments to all stores. Canadian Best Buy locations will honour Future Shop warranties and gift cards.
