= Reitmans =

Canadian retailing company

Reitmans (Canada) Limited

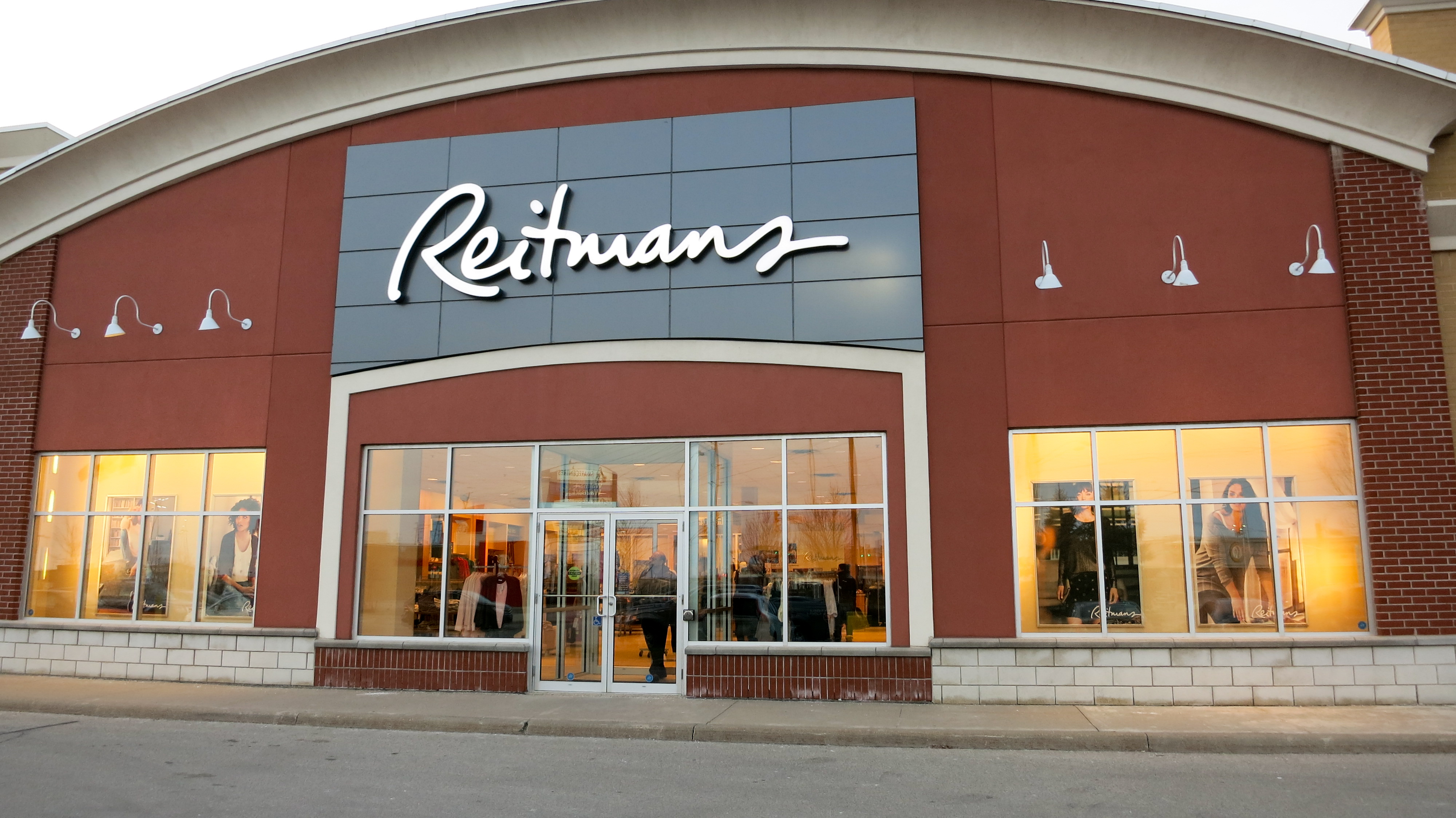
- Type: Public
- Traded as: TSX-V: RET
- Industry: Clothing Stores
- Founded: Montreal, Quebec, Canada (1926)
- Founders: Herman Reitman; Sarah Reitman
- Headquarters: Montreal, Quebec, Canada
- Number of locations: 400+
- Key people: Andrea Limbardi (President and chief executive officer); Stephen F. Reitman (Executive Chairman of the Board)
- Products: Women's Clothing
- Revenue: ▲CA$800.6 million (2023)
- Operating income: ▼CA$77.7 million (2023)
- Number of employees: 6,812 (2023)
- Divisions: Reitmans; RW&CO.; Penningtons
- Website: www.reitmanscanadalimited.com

Reitmans (Canada) Limited is a Canadian retailing company, specializing in women's clothing. The company operates several store brands, including Reitmans, Penningtons, and RW&CO.

Reitmans was founded in 1926 by Herman and Sarah Reitman, in Montreal, Quebec. The immediate success of the first store on Saint Laurent Boulevard prompted the Reitmans to open a second store which sold exclusively women's clothing. The founders' grandson Jeremy Reitman (who died in 2019) would later serve as chairman of the board and chief executive officer, with his brother Stephen Reitman as president and chief operating officer. By 2016, the company was active in 685 locations with stores in every province and two of three territories in Canada. For the fiscal year of 2015, net earnings were $13,415,000 on sales of $939,376,000. However, Reitmans Canada Limited sought protection under the Companies' Creditors Arrangement Act (the "CCAA") in May 2020 in order to facilitate its operational, commercial and financial restructuring. They subsequently closed their Thyme Maternity (54 locations) and Addition Elle (77 locations) stores over the summer of 2020. As at April 30, 2022, the Company emerged from protection and operated 406 stores consisting of 237 Reitmans, 92 Penningtons and 77 RW&CO. The company's stock was moved from the Toronto Stock Exchange to the TSX Venture Exchange.

In June 2023, Andrea Limbardi is named as president and chief executive, the company's first non-family member to occupy this position.

== Divisions ==
Reitmans Canada Limited stores organized into operating chains aimed at different market segments.

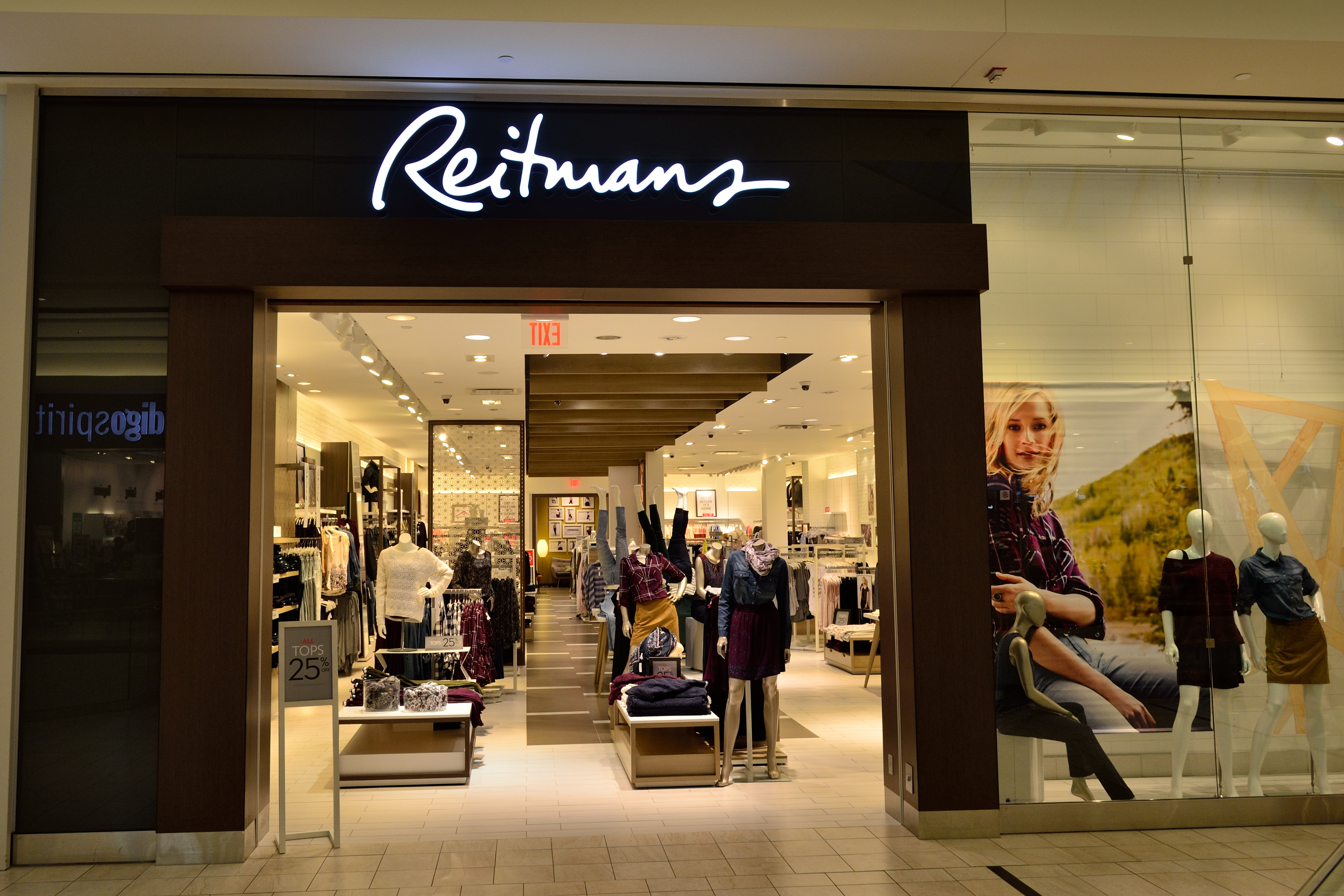
Reitmans in Markville Shopping Centre in Markham, Ontario.

=== Current divisions ===
- Reitmans is Canada's largest women's clothing specialty chain. There are 270 Reitmans stores, with stores in all ten provinces and two of Canada's three territories.
- RW&CO. caters to men and women aged 25 to 40. It is the only chain in the Reitmans group that caters to both women and men. There are 89 RW & Co stores, with stores located in every province.
- Penningtons caters to plus sized women. The chain offers career, casual clothing, underwear and accessories. There are 122 Penningtons stores, with stores located in all ten provinces.

=== Closed divisions ===
- Hyba, re-branded from Smart Set, was a women's activewear store closures were announced by Reitmans in March 2019; however, the Hyba clothing line continued to be carried at Reitmans stores thereafter
- Thyme Maternity catered to pregnant women. There were 63 Thyme Maternity stores, with stores in every province except Newfoundland and Prince Edward Island.
- Addition Elle focused on plus sized women. There were 90 Addition Elle stores.
- Cassis focused on women aged 40 to 60 but closed in 2011.
