= Addition Elle =

Canadian clothing store chain

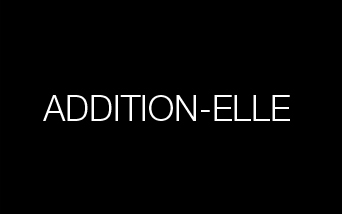
- Industry: Apparel and accessories retail
- Founded: 1980; 46 years ago in Montreal
- Fate: Parent Company, Reitmans, announced closing of all Addition Elle stores on August 15, 2020 (6 years ago).
- Headquarters: Montreal, Quebec
- Number of locations: 139
- Area served: Canada
- Key people: Janice Leclerc; Jeff Ronald
- Products: Women's clothing Lingerie
- Number of employees: 16-50
- Parent: Reitmans
- Website: additionelle.com

Addition Elle was a Canadian clothing store chain that sold plus-size clothing. It was established in Montreal and sold to Reitmans in 2001. It closed all 74 Canadian locations August 15, 2020. Addition Elle clothing line can now be found at sister store, Penningtons.

== Summary ==
The name of the store (not affiliated with Elle magazine) is a pun on the French word additionelle, which translates to additional in English. The company was established in Montreal in 1980, and sold to Reitmans in 2001. Addition Elle had 139 locations across Canada. All clothing comes in at least a ladies' size 14 and goes up to size 26. The target demographic of the store was full figured women between 18 and 49 years of age. Some stores also sell bras and other lingerie items. Prior to the restructuring of Reitmans Ltd and the closing of all stores in Canada, Addition Elle stores were usually located in shopping malls, but a few were standalone big box stores.

Sportswear, career apparel, and casual designs are the basic staples of all Addition Elle franchises.

Jessica Biffi, who was a former contestant on the reality show Project Runway Canada, designed a collection of clothing for Addition Elle for the spring 2010 fashion season.
