= Lawrence Sheriff School =

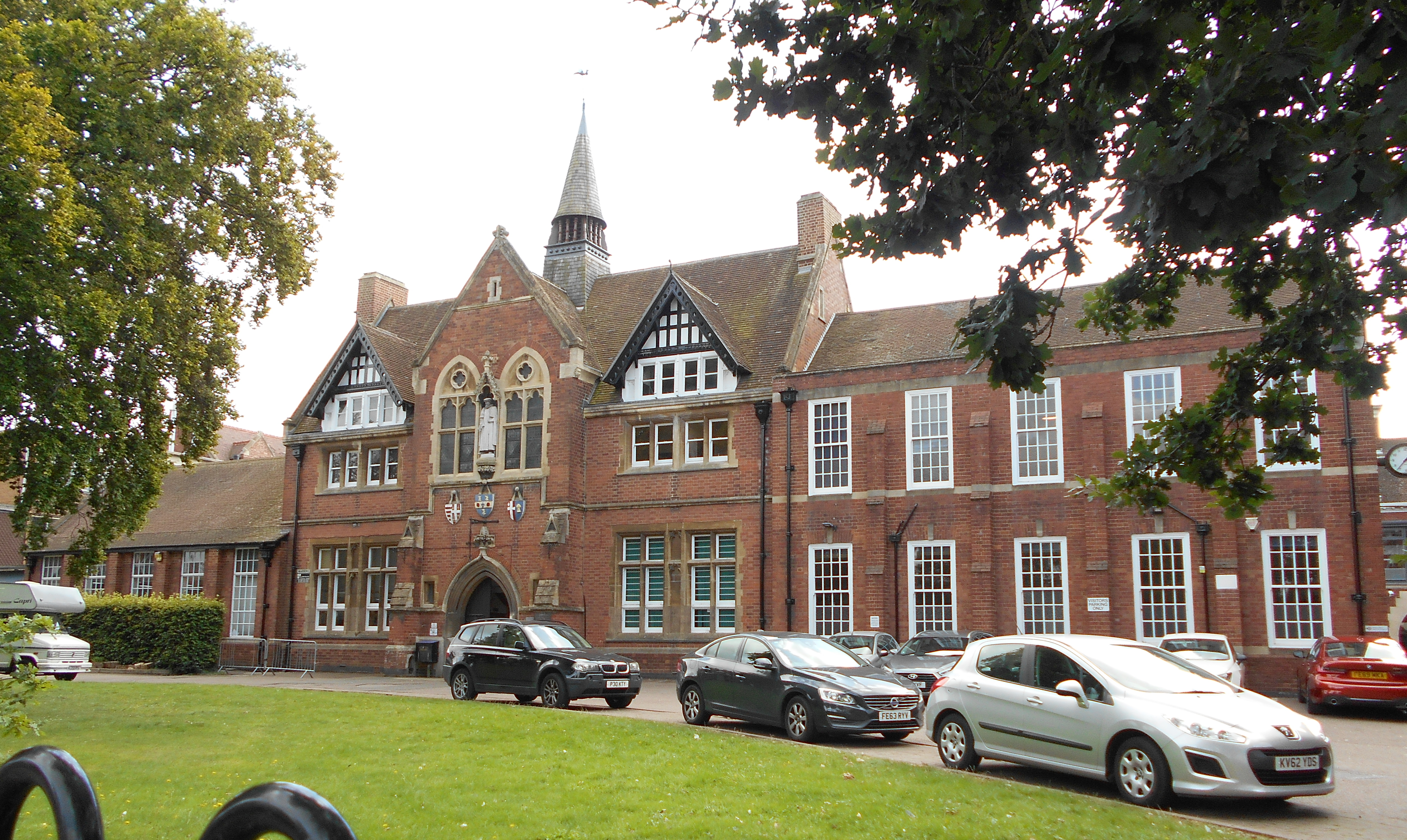

Location
- Clifton Road; Rugby, Warwickshire, CV21 3AG; England; 52.3713°N 1.2555°W

Information
- Type: Grammar school; Academy
- Established: 1878
- Local authority: Warwickshire County Council
- Department for Education URN: 141277 Tables
- Ofsted: Reports
- Head teacher: Teresa Mpofu
- Faculty: 69
- Gender: Male only (Years 7 - 11) Mixed Gender (Sixth Form)
- Age: 11 to 18
- Enrolment: 1250
- Houses: Caldecott, Simpson, Tait, Wheeler, Kent
- Colours: Navy and White
- Publication: The Bi-Weekly Word, LSS Griffin
- Website: www.lawrencesheriffschool.net

Lawrence Sheriff School (LSS) is a boys' grammar school in Rugby, Warwickshire, England. The school is named after Lawrence Sheriff, the Elizabethan founder of Rugby School. The school was founded in 1878, in order to continue Sheriff's original bequest for a free grammar school for the boys of Rugby and surrounding villages, which had originally been fulfilled by Rugby School, until the latter moved to become a fee-paying public school in the 19th century. The school's name is often shortened to 'LSS', or often just 'Sheriff'. The school has historically run in partnership with Rugby High School for Girls, a nearby girls' grammar school.

== History ==
The Griffin: the Lawrence Sheriff School emblem

=== Foundation ===
Lawrence Sheriff School was founded to fulfill Lawrence Sheriff's original intentions to provide a school for the boys of Rugby and neighbouring Brownsover, which was originally carried out by Rugby School. By the eighteenth century, Rugby School had acquired a national reputation as a public school and moved to its present site.

As the proportion of pupils from outside Rugby increased and the people of the town seemed to benefit less from Lawrence Sheriff's original bequest, local concern led to the nineteenth-century proposal of a Lower School for local boys, with Foundation Scholarships to the Great School. It was proposed to become "a first rate school for the sons of tradesmen and middle classes". Although the proposal faced substantial local opposition, the Lower School was opened in 1878 on the present site of Lawrence Sheriff School with a curriculum designed to meet the needs of a commercial education and preparation for Rugby School. By 1906, a compromise between the traditions of the Foundation and a proposal to hand the school over to the county, led to a Governing body chaired by the Headmaster of Rugby School and containing both Foundation and County Governors. The school was built on what before was glebe land named Market Field, at what was the east limit of the built-up area of Rugby.

=== Second World War ===
Due to the need for maximum food production within Britain during the Second World War, unproductive land (sports fields, large ornamental gardens, parks, golf courses, etc.) was requisitioned for farming or allotment gardens. In this period, the School Field and a third of the Hart Field were used in the grass growing season for sheep grazing but remained in school sport use. Most of the rest of the Hart Field was ploughed and used for growing wheat, except a strip along the bottom edge border that was used for allotment gardens; that border was adjacent to existing allotment gardens which were outside the school property. Approximately one third of the school's sixth form lost their lives during the war.

=== Voluntary aided status ===
This partnership continued into voluntary aided status under the 1944 Act.

At the time the school opened, it was on the outskirts of Rugby town, which in 1878 was much smaller than now. The original building (now called Big School), was extended in 1909 with side wings (now used for Art and MFL) on each side. The school continued to grow with several extensions, including the Jubilee Wings (1926 and 1934), the library wing (1957), and major expansion in the early 1960s, which included new biology labs and a new gymnasium. Big School was badly damaged by a fire in 1980, but was immediately restored. The school organ was damaged beyond repair and was replaced.

In September 2014 Lawrence Sheriff School converted to academy status, thus ending its status as a voluntary aided school.

== Present day ==
Lawrence Sheriff School is now the selective boys' grammar school for Rugby and the surrounding area. The school also has an old boys society: the Old Laurentians.

The school has been expanded greatly in the last fifteen years with the construction of a new sixth form centre and the conversion of Penrhos House, originally the sixth form common room, into a Music block, as well as the construction of a new Learning Resources Centre, and a new Science Block.

=== Sport ===
The school owns a playing field, Hart Field, a mile away east-southeastwards, with five Rugby pitches and changing rooms. Over the school year of 2009, the field was regenerated with new pitches created, including an Astroturf field, a new block of changing rooms, cricket nets and levelled playing fields.

Following funding from Sport England, the school also houses a regional and local table tennis centre.

== Academic performance ==
In 2008, 2010 and 2011 the school came first in national performance tables based upon data from the Department for Education (schools were ranked by their total points score in examinations). In 2012 it came fourth in the country and in 2013 it came seventh out of 3,200 secondary schools.

In 2013 75% of boys gained the English Baccalaureate. Comparing this to local selective schools in the area 87% of King Edward VI pupils, 73% of Bablake pupils, 66% of Rugby High School pupils and 64% of Rugby School pupils gained the certificate.

In 2014 97% of boys gained the English Baccalaureate, placing the school third in the country according to the performance tables published in the Daily Telegraph on Thursday 29 January. The same table showed that the school's average points score placed it fifteenth in the country.

In January 2009 the school achieved an average point score of 792, whilst in January 2011 it came top again, with an average point score of 757.4.

== Recent changes ==
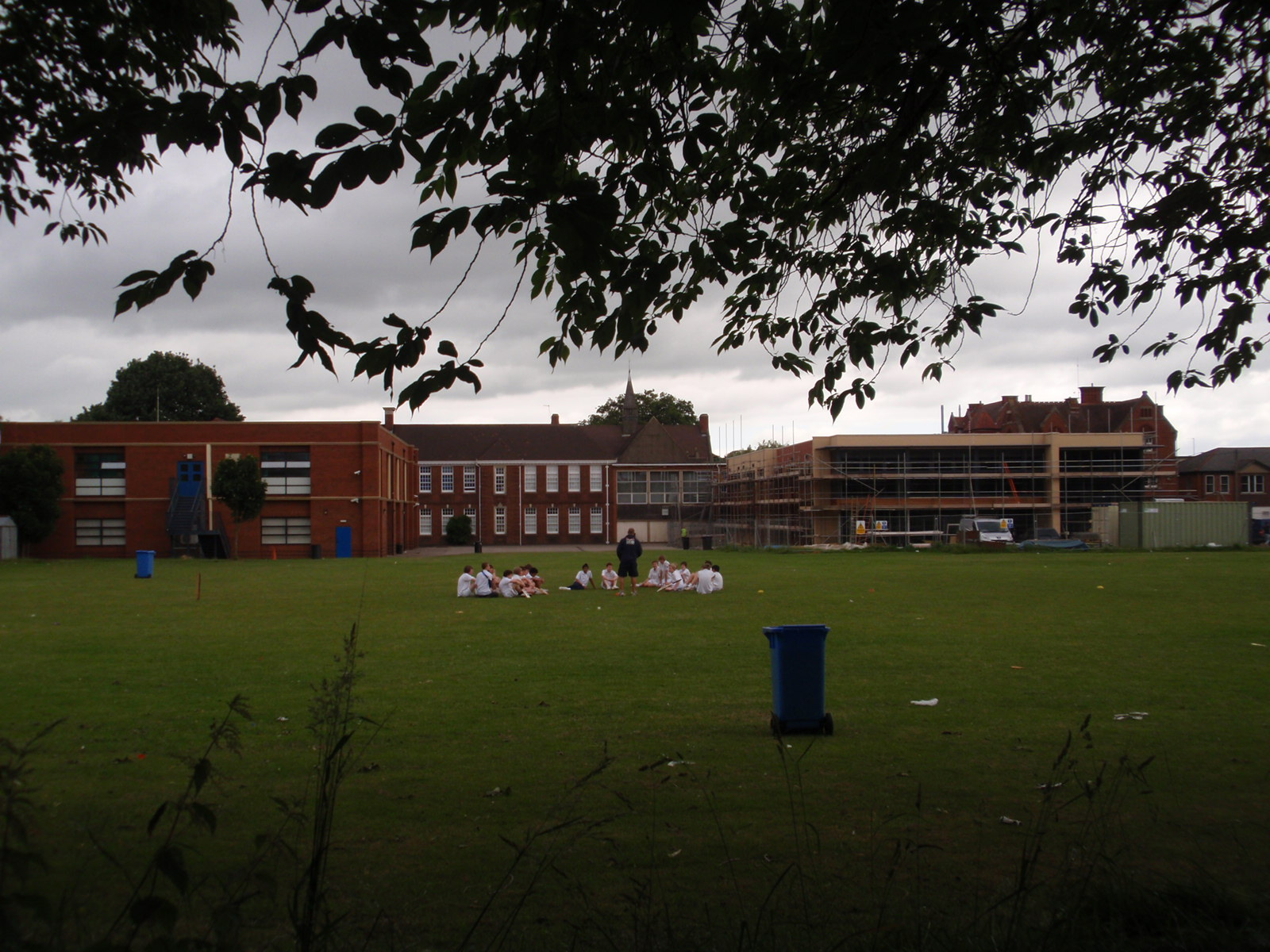
Lawrence Sheriff School: two new buildings spreading into the School Field, 25 June 2008

The school operates a vertical tutoring system, in which forms consist of students from each year group. This was implemented to allow older students to mentor and support younger students. It also provides tutors with increased opportunities to support individual students and to check their progress more closely.

The school is partnering with Lutterworth High School in order to sponsor a primary school in the area. However, Peter Kent, the school's previous headmaster, stated that the new school will not become a feeder school for Lawrence Sheriff.

In September 2020, a new house, named Kent house after the longest-serving headteacher Peter Kent, was introduced. This led to an increase in new Year 7 students from 120 to 150 to accommodate the new house.

A new science building was completed in 2021. Following this, the Art department has taken over rooms previously used for sciences.

Historically, the positions of head boy and, once the sixth form became mixed, head girl were filled through a competitive election cycle including speeches and teacher and student voting. The head student position was abolished in 2021.

== Notable Old Laurentians ==
Former pupils at the school are called Old Laurentians and include:

- Steve Beebee – author and journalist
- Arthur Bostrom – Crabtree in 'Allo 'Allo! (head boy at the school)
- Will Carruthers – musician
- Michael Claridge – professor of entomology at Cardiff University from 1983–99 and president of the Linnean Society of London from 1988–91
- Ben Croshaw – producer of Zero Punctuation
- Valentine Cunningham – professor of English language and literature at the University of Oxford since 1996
- Reginald Foort - organist
- John L. Harper CBE – plant biologist
- Thomas Hedley – media magnate
- Robert George Spencer Hudson – geologist and president of the Palaeontological Association from 1957–59
- Ralph Hudson Johnson FRSE (1933–1993) – neurologist
- Allen Lloyd - founder of LloydsPharmacy
- Mark Mapletoft – former England rugby player and season top point scorer in English rugby union premiership
- David Mowat – Conservative MP for Warrington South from 2010–17
- Mark Pawsey – Conservative MP for Rugby from 2010-24.
- Jason Pierce – singer
- Mike Powell – Warwickshire cricketer
- Ric Todd – former Ambassador to Poland (2007–11) and Governor of the Turks and Caicos Islands (2011–2013)
- Andrew Rawnsley – political journalist
- Walter Sweeney – Conservative MP for Vale of Glamorgan from 1992–97
- Maj-Gen Anthony Trythall CB – director of Army Education from 1980–84
- Kevin Warwick – computer scientist
- Norman Wooding CBE – chairman of Courtaulds from 1978–83

== Houses ==
There are five houses: Caldecott (Purple), Simpson (Green), Tait (Red), Wheeler (Blue) and Kent (Yellow). There are many inter-house competitions between the five. These competitions can range from sports or academic competitions. At the end of each year, the house with the most points for each competition wins a trophy. In 2020, Kent house was established to fit the increasing number of students being admitted.

Wheeler house was renamed from "School House" in 1963.

Tait house was named after a local auctioneer and parent- Edwin Tait. In 1891, an altercation broke out between Mr Tait and the headmaster Mr Weisse over the flogging of his son. The situation was resolved and Mr Tait subsequently presented a cup for the Champion Athlete.

Kent house was named after Professor Peter Kent, the previous headmaster who departed the school at the end of the 2021 autumn term. Professor Kent recently spoke at COP28.

== Local Government Ombudsman Report ==
On 19 May 2014 the school was found at fault by the Local Government Ombudsman for failing to provide an appeal to a child whose place was withdrawn for 2013 entry.

== Harassment against the school ==
In 2015 at the Coventry County Court, the School successfully applied for an injunction against a parent who for many years harassed senior members of the school through a number of different channels. The judge ruled that the parent had "crossed the boundary between unattractive or unreasonable conduct to conduct, which is, indeed, oppressive and unacceptable. It has plainly involved a deliberate and persistent course of, in my view, unreasonable and oppressive conduct, which was calculated to, and did, cause alarm, fear or distress…”

== Other information ==
- The Parents' Association is in the Guinness Book of Records as the UK's oldest Parents Association.
- The school has a partnership with Rugby School and has a working relationship with Rugby High School, allowing sixth form students access to a broader curriculum.
