= Charles Olcott =

Charles Olcott may refer to:

- Charles S. Olcott (1864–1935), American non-fiction writer
- Charles M. Olcott (died 1853), American pharmacist
- Charles Olcott (CEO), American businessman
