= Cumberland Drugs =

Canadian pharmacy chain

- Industry: Pharmacy, Retail
- Founded: 1967
- Defunct: 1997
- Fate: pharmacies sold to Jean Coutu Group, Uniprix and Essaim (now Proxim)
- Headquarters: Dorval, Quebec, Canada
- Number of locations: 40 (1987)
- Key people: Morrie Neiss (founder)
- Products: Drugs, Health
- Footnotes / references Source of logo

Cumberland Drugs was a pharmacy chain that operated stores in Quebec (with majority of them in the Montreal area) and Eastern Ontario. Founded in 1967, Cumberland Drugs was sold in 1997 upon the retirement of Morrie Neiss (none of his heirs were interested in carrying on the family business), selling most stores to Jean Coutu, Uniprix and Essaim/Obonsoins (now Proxim). Cumberland Drugs' headquarters in Dorval were on Dorval Ave. The flagship store in Dorval, Quebec, Canada, on Herron Blvd. is now a Jean Coutu store.

In 1987, the company had forty stores across Quebec and Ontario. In 1988, the company acquired six Montreal locations when it bought the Kane's Super Drugmart chain, which supported Cumberland's move into the city's French-speaking areas. At the time, the dominant pharmacy chain in the city was Le Groupe Jean Coutu.

Around 1990, Cumberland's sale of retail, non-prescription glasses was challenged in court by the Quebec Order of Optometrists, in an apparent test case where the professional association was trying to block the sale of these inexpensive vision assists which did not require professional vision assessment, a case that the company initially lost in Quebec Court, which was overturned by the Superior Court.

Also in 1990, the chain was one of seventeen in Quebec which was caught up in a price-fixing investigation by the Bureau of Competition Policy affecting birth-control pills and prescription narcotics.

== Executive history ==
As of 1987, the company's President and chief executive officer (CEO) was Morrie Neiss; Paul Lamontagne was the company's chief operating officer (COO); Michel Gagnon was the companyes chief financial officer (CFO). Neiss, Lamontagne and Gagnon were also members of the Board, Neiss being its Chairperson.
