= ESR =

ESR may refer to:

== Organizations ==
- Earlham School of Religion, at Earlham College in Richmond, Indiana, US
- E.S.R., Inc., a former American toy manufacturer
- ESR Rīga, a Soviet Latvian football club, active from 1966 to 1991
- ESR Technology, a UK company
- e-Shang Redwood, an Asia focused Real Estate services and investment firm
- Ethnikó Simvúlio Radhiotileórasis (Greek: Εθνικό Συμβούλιο Ραδιοτηλεόρασης), the Greek National Council for Radio and Television
- European Society of Radiology
- Institute of Environmental Science and Research, a New Zealand scientific institute

== Science ==
- EISCAT Svalbard radar, UHF-band radar at Longyearbyen, Norway
- Electron spin resonance, a technique used in chemical spectroscopy to identify unpaired electrons and free radicals
- Electron spin resonance dating, a dating technique used in archaeology and geology
- Erythrocyte sedimentation rate, the rate at which red blood cells sediment
- Estrogen receptor, a group of proteins
- European Sociological Review, sociological scientific journal

== Technology ==
- Electro-slag remelting, an alloy remelting and refining process
- Electronic Staff Record, a human resources and payroll system of the UK National Health Service
- Equivalent series resistance, the resistive parts of the impedance of certain electrical components
- Emergency sun reacquisition, an attitude control mode of the Solar and Heliospheric Observatory
- Extended-support release, software that receives official security updates for an extended period of time
- M2010 Enhanced Sniper Rifle, a sniper rifle used by the US Army

== Transportation ==
- East Somerset Railway, a heritage railway in the UK
- Eastar Jet (ICAO code), a Korean airline
- Eastern Suburbs Railway, a railway line in Sydney, New South Wales, Australia
- Ricardo García Posada Airport (IATA code), Chile
- Emergency speed restriction, a UK railway speed reduction

== Other uses ==
- Eric S. Raymond (born 1957), American computer programmer, author and open source software advocate
- Emile Smith Rowe, English professional footballer for Fulham FC
- Effort Sharing Regulation, a European Union policy on greenhouse gas emissions
