= Health Mart =

American pharmacy chain

- Type: Subsidiary
- Industry: Retail pharmacy
- Founded: 1997; 29 years ago
- Parent: McKesson Corporation

Health Mart is an independent pharmacy franchise with more than 5,000 member pharmacies across all 50 states. Each pharmacy is locally owned and operated, allowing Health Mart pharmacy owners to tailor their offerings to the specific communities they serve.

The Health Mart franchise is owned by Health Mart Systems, Inc., which is part of McKesson Corporation.

== History ==
The Health Mart franchise was formed under FoxMeyer in 1982. A private label line was introduced the following year. By 1985, there were 257 independent drug stores using the name. The franchise accounted for 10.7% of the wholesaler's total drug distribution revenues. There were 400 stores when National Intergroup, a holding company for the National Steel Corporation, acquired FoxMeyer in 1986. That number had increased to 800 when FoxMeyer rolled out FoxCare Network, its managed care pharmacy network, in 1994. Health Mart's parent company, the FoxMeyer Drug Company, filed for Chapter 11 bankruptcy in August 1996. By October, McKesson Corporation acquired FoxMeyer Drug, along with the Health Mart franchise, for $400 million.

McKesson cut the franchise to 262 stores by 2004. The company then relaunched the brand in July 2006, with a new franchising model, logo, and store design, as well as a focus on managed care and expansion. By April 2007, the franchise had 1,280 stores. That year, Health Mart was named "Chain of the Year" by Drug Topics.

By 2010, the company had grown to 2,500 stores across all 50 US states. That year, it also launched a national ad campaign during the Grammy Awards, Super Bowl, and Winter Olympics that year. In 2011, Health Mart topped traditional chain drug stores in terms of pharmacy customer satisfaction in a JD Power study. The company debuted its own private label in November 2011, adding an assortment of products in the following months.

In 2013, Health Mart was recognized by Drug Store News as the nation's largest independent pharmacy franchise and one of the fastest growing drug store networks of any kind with more than 3,100 member stores. By 2015, Health Mart launched its 4,000th store. In 2016, it entered into a generics sourcing partnership with Walmart.

In April 2018, Health Mart Atlas was launched as a joint venture between McKesson AccessHealth and American Pharmacy Cooperative, Inc. to support its stores as a pharmacy services administrative organization. Atlas immediately became the largest PSAO in the industry. That year, J.D. Power gave Health Mart the second-highest score in its rankings of brick-and-mortar chain drugstores.

In January 2019, Health Mart announced it had hired Nimesh Jhaveri, formerly of Walgreens, to serve as its president. In October, the franchise announced a partnership with Amazon, which would allow its pharmacies to operate as package pickup locations.

In 2020, Health Mart began working with the Department of Health and Human Services (HHS) to act as the community pharmacy representative for its Ready, Set, PrEP program. The Ready, Set, PrEP program provides pre-exposure prophylaxis (PrEP) medications to at-risk individuals at no cost. More than 3,300 Health Mart pharmacies signed on to donate their dispensing fees as part of the program. In October 2020, Jhaveri transitioned to a new role as president of community pharmacy at McKesson and Eyad Farah was named president of Health Mart and Health Mart Atlas.

During the COVID-19 pandemic, Health Mart again worked with HHS to develop COVID-19 test collection sites at Health Mart pharmacies selected by HHS. It was also the first independent group of pharmacies to offer the COVID-19 vaccine. The chain collectively administered more than one million vaccinations by May 19, 2021.

By 2022, Health Mart Atlas had more than 6,000 members. At the end of the year, the company launched Atlas Specialty to offer specialty-focused pharmacy services. In December 2023, McKesson appointed Crystal Lennartz as president of Health Mart and Health Mart Atlas. Health Mart ranked highest among brick-and-mortar chain drug store pharmacies in J.D. Power's 2025 U.S. Pharmacy Study.

== See also ==
- Republic Drug Store, an historic pharmacy and franchise member of Health Mart
