= Robert Matschullat =

American investor

Robert W. Matschullat is a private equity investor, and served from October 1995 until June 2000 as Vice Chairman of the board of directors and Chief Financial Officer of The Seagram Company Ltd. He also served as Chief Financial Officer of Seagram until December 1999. Prior to joining Seagram, Matschullat was head of worldwide investment banking for Morgan Stanley and was on the Morgan Stanley Group board of directors. He was the Presiding Director of the Board of Directors of the Clorox Company from January 2005 to March 7, 2006, and was director of McKesson Corporation from October 2002 to July 25, 2007. Matschullat has been a Director of The Walt Disney Company since 2002. He also joined Visa Inc's Board of Directors in October 2007 and was elected as the non-executive independent Chair on January 29, 2013.
