= Quantum Pharmaceutical =

Quantum Pharma Plc
- Formerly: Quantum Specials; Quantum Pharmaceuticals
- Traded as: LSE: QP
- Industry: Pharmaceutical
- Founded: 2004
- Founder: Ian Edge; Alison Norman; Andrew Patterson; Phil Richardson
- Fate: Acquired by Clinigen Group in 2017; subsequently purchased by Target Healthcare in 2021.
- Headquarters: Burnopfield
- Area served: United Kingdom
- Key people: Andrew Scaife (CEO, 2014- )
- Owner: company management (8.5%, 2014); LDC (8.2%, 2014)
- Number of employees: 145 (2009)
- Website: www.quantumpharmaceutical.co.uk

Quantum Pharma Plc (LSE: QP) is a manufacturer and supplier of unlicensed medicines and Special Obtain products based in Burnopfield, County Durham. As of 2014, Andrew Scaife was the company's chief executive officer (CEO), who had joined the company's management team in 2009.

As of the company's initial public offering (IPO) in 2014, its activities were divided among five units:

- Quantum Pharmaceutical
- U L Medicines
- Colonis Pharma (specialist pharmaceutical product development)
- Biodose
- Quantum Aseptics

== History ==
Quantum Pharmaceutical, previously Quantum Specials, was formed in 2004 by four former managers from Unichem-owned Eldon Laboratories, and 26 pharmacists at Tyne Metropolitan College. In 2005, Phoenix Medical Supplies acquired 30% of the company. A management buyout in 2009, including the Phoenix Medical stake, saw the company partner with Lloyds Development Capital (LDC), who remained a shareholder after the company's IPO in 2014. Yorkshire Bank Corporate also provided senior debt and working capital financing to support the 2009 buyout; and LDC's director, John Swarbrick, joined the company's board of directors.

In March 2011, the company celebrated achieving one million customer orders.

In December 2014, LDC facilitated the IPO of the firm, which resulted in a £125 million valuation. The IPO was done on the Alternative Investment Market (AIM) on the London Stock Exchange, and the Nominated Advisor for the company's offering was Zeus Capital. Funds from the IPO went to finalizing acquisition of Colonis Pharma Limited and paying off outstanding business debt.

In September 2017, the Clinigen Group of Britain, an apparent competitor of Quantum Pharma, agreed to acquire the firm for £150.3 million, noting that Quantum "introduces an unlicensed medicine ... to cope with an unmet need and it converts it into a licensed medicine." The acquisition provided "a bridge" between the unlicensed medicines and commercial medicines units of the Clingen Group.

In mid-2021, the company was acquired by Glasgow-based Target Healthcare with support from N4 Advisory.

== Investigations into inflated prices ==
In June 2013 the Daily Telegraph infiltrated reporters into the annual Pharmacy Congress to investigate malpractice in the market for Specials. These products are generally individually priced. It was alleged that the company was prepared to offer backhanders in various ways. In particular it was alleged that the company could supply generic drugs free of charge in return for the right to supply a chain of pharmacies with special drugs.

In December 2013 it was fined more than £380,000 by the Office of Fair Trading over a cartel arrangement in which it carved up some of a multimillion-pound market in prescription drugs for care homes with Lloyds Pharmacy. In 2010 it had been in a dispute with another company, Camrx, about inflated pricing of specials in which it denied any involvement.
