= John Hammergren =

American businessman (born 1959)

John H. Hammergren
- Born: John Hammergren; 20 February 1959 (age 67); Saint Paul, Minnesota, U.S.
- Occupations: CEO of McKesson Corporation, Retired

John H. Hammergren is an American businessman. He is best known for his role as chairman and CEO of McKesson Corporation since 1999. On November 1, 2018, Hammergren announced his plan to retire. On April 1, 2019, he officially retired from McKesson. He was succeeded by Brian Tyler.

== Early life and education ==
Hammergren was born in Saint Paul, Minnesota, on February 20, 1959. His father was a traveling salesman in the healthcare industry.

After attending the University of Minnesota, Hammergren received an MBA from William College Of Business at Xavier University.

== Career ==
Hammergren began his career at American Hospital Supply, which was subsequently purchased by Baxter Healthcare.

=== McKesson Corporation ===
In 1996, Hammergren was hired by McKesson Corporation to run the Pharmaceutical division at McKesson.

In 1999, soon after McKesson's fraud scandal, he was named president and co-CEO of the company, becoming sole CEO in 2001, and chairman of the board in 2002.

Hammergren was elected president and CEO of McKesson in 2001 and chairman in 2002. In 2017, McKesson was involved in a number of lawsuits against the state of Arkansas over the supply of vecuronium bromide.

Lawsuits alleged that McKesson directors paid little attention to oversight of opioid sales after a 2008 settlement centering on the company's insufficient monitoring of such shipments. The lawsuit involved ten existing and former executives and directors, including Hammergren.

Hammergren was criticized for his pay given the controversy surrounding the company's role in the opioid epidemic and failure to report suspicious opioid orders.

Hammergren's annual bonus pay was increased to amount of $1.1 million in 2017. The International Brotherhood of Teamsters, who own shares in the company, said of the bonus pay issue: "It is staggering that Hammergren received a $1.1 million boost to his bonus just months after the company announced it had reached a record $150 million settlement with the DEA in a year the company faces mounting litigation, negative press and Congressional scrutiny." The union urged shareholders to vote against Hammergren's compensation package at the company's annual shareholder meeting.

==== Highest paid CEO ====
In December 2011 it was revealed that Hammergren was the highest paid CEO in the U.S. with total remuneration in excess of $700 million.

Annual total compensation payouts
	1999	2008	2009	2010	2011	2012	2013	2014 p	2015	2016
(in million $)	0.692	41	37	55	46		66.3			

In June 2014, Glenn Gray, a former employee at McKesson returned to the company's annual meeting to ask that Hammergren's $292 million severance package be redistributed to low-paid employees. The proposal was defeated by the shareholders. He had also earlier, in 2013, 4 months before being relieved from his duties at McKesson, asked for wage raises during the company's annual meeting too.

According to a Bloomberg Pay Index, Hammergren had taken home $781 million as of July 2017, since becoming sole CEO at McKesson in 2001.

=== Hewlett-Packard ===
In 2005, Hammergren was elected to Hewlett-Packard's board of directors. Hammergren served until 2013 when he left the board. New York City's public pension funds supported the efforts to oust Hammergren and G. Kennedy Thompson because of their support for the company's 2011 acquisition of British software maker Autonomy and "their failure to protect investors from costly, misguided acquisitions." Hammergren received less than 60 percent of the vote for reelection at the 2013 annual shareholder vote and subsequently resigned.

=== Awards ===
- Best-performing CEOs in the world by the Harvard Business Review, ranked #53 in 2014 and #63 in 2015.)

=== Other tenures ===
- Chairman of the supervisory board of Celesio AG
- Member of the Healthcare Leadership Council
- Member of the board of trustees for the Center for Strategic and International Studies
- Member of Hewlett-Packard's board of directors (2005-2013)

== Book ==
- Hammergren, John (2008). Skin in the Game: How Putting Yourself First Today Will Revolutionize Health Care Tomorrow. Wiley. ISBN 978-0470262788.
