= Ralph Hudson Johnson =

British neurologist

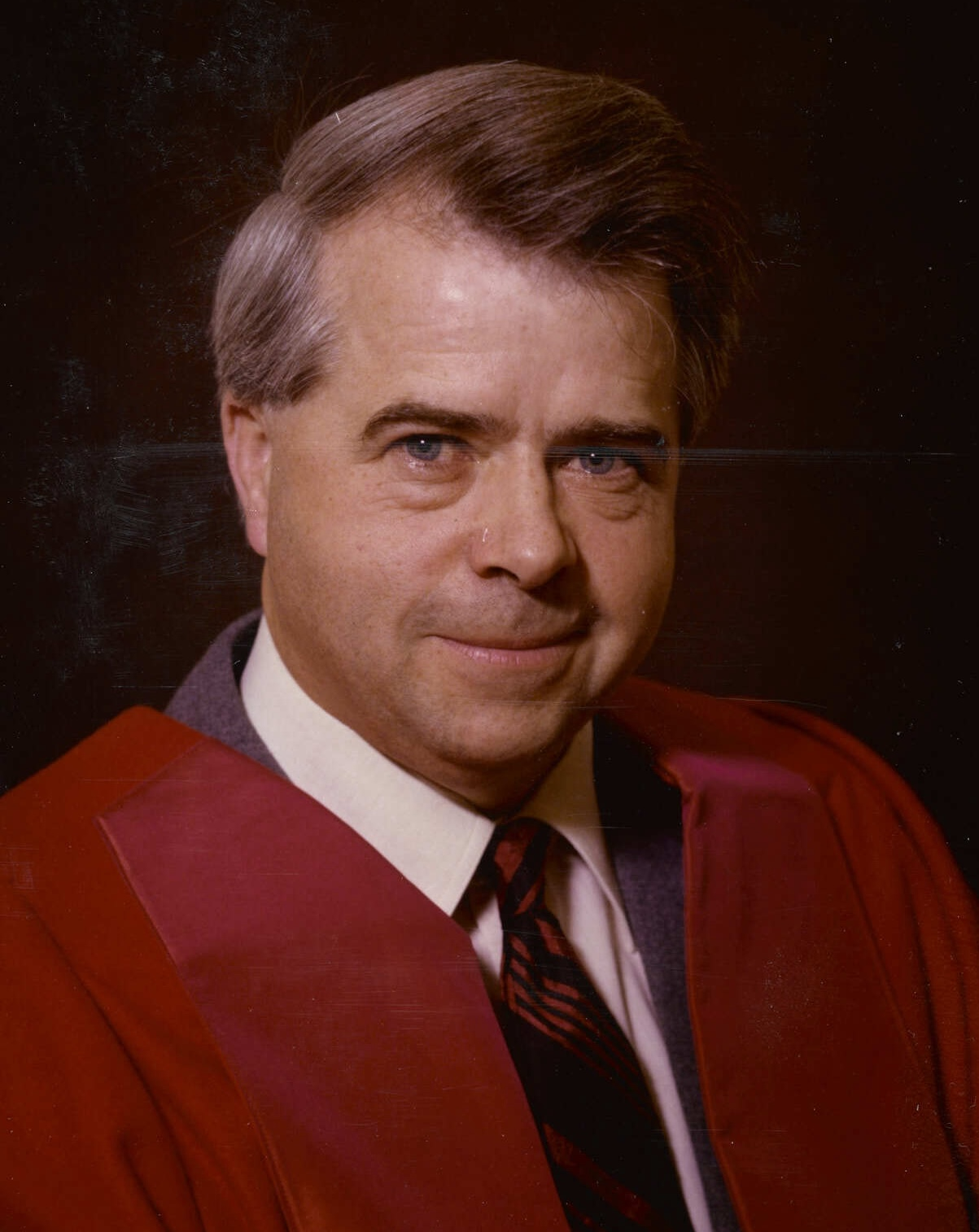
- Johnson in 1981
- Born: 3 December 1933; Sunderland, England
- Died: 1 July 1993 (aged 59); Oxford, England
- Spouse: Gillian Keith (m. 1970)
- Children: 2

Academic background
- Education: University of Cambridge; University of Oxford

Academic work
- Discipline: Neurology
- Institutions: Radcliffe Infirmary; Wellington Clinical School of Medicine; Wadham College, Oxford

Ralph Hudson Johnson FRSE (3 December 1933 – 1 July 1993) was a 20th-century British neurologist.

== Early life and education ==
He was born on 3 December 1933 in Sunderland, Tyne and Wear the son of Sydney Reynolds Edward Johnson, an electrical engineer, and his wife, Phyllis. He attended Lawrence Sheriff School and then won a scholarship to Rugby School. He won a double scholarship and obtained multiple degrees at both University of Cambridge and University of Oxford.

== Career ==
Johnson completed his training at UCL Medical School in London, in 1958. In 1960, he moved to the Radcliffe Infirmary in Oxford, where he conducted research on artificial respiration for poliomyelitis and rehabilitation of paraplegics, winning awards from the Polio Research Fund, British Medical Association and the Schorstein Medical Research Fellowship of Oxford University.

He was awarded multiple doctorates and honorary doctorates throughout his career. In 1976 he was elected a Fellow of the Royal Society of Edinburgh. His proposers were John A Simpson, Robert Martin Stuart Smellie, Henry G Morgan, and Reginald Passmore.

In 1977, he went to the newly created Wellington Clinical School of Medicine in New Zealand as its first dean. Mixing research with organisational skills, he created a new Diploma in Community Health in 1981, and a department of post-basic nursing studies in collaboration with the Victoria University of Wellington. In 1987 he returned to Britain, taking up a Fellowship at Wadham College, Oxford.

== Death ==
A hobby beekeeper, he died of anaphylactic shock after having been stung by a few of his own bees in his garden in Oxford on 1 July 1993.

== Publications ==
- Disorders of the Automatic Nervous System (1974) with J M K Spalding
- Multiple Sclerosis in Scotland (1978)
- Neurocardiology (1985) with Lambie and Spalding

== Family ==
In 1970, he married Gillian S Keith, a social worker. They had two children, Rachel and Mark.
