= McKesson and Robbins scandal =

Financial scandal

The McKesson and Robbins scandal was a major financial scandal in 1938, involving McKesson and Robbins, Inc, now McKesson Corporation. It is widely considered one of the largest financial scandals of the 20th century.

McKesson and Robbins was taken over in 1925 by Phillip Musica, who previously used Adelphia Pharmaceutical Manufacturing Company as a front for bootlegging operations. Musica, a twice-convicted felon, used assumed names to conceal his true identity in taking control of the two companies: Frank D. Costa at Adelphia Pharmaceutical and F. Donald Coster at McKesson and Robbins.

Although Musica was successful in expanding the company's legitimate business operations, he recruited three of his brothers, also working under assumed names, one outside the company and two inside it, to generate bogus sales documentation and to pay commissions to a shell distribution company under their control. McKesson and Robbins treasurer Julian Thompson discovered the distribution company was bogus. It was determined that about $20 million (about $335 million in 2017 dollars) of the $87 million in assets on the company's balance sheet were phony.

In December 1938, the Securities and Exchange Commission (SEC) opened an investigation and Musica was arrested. After he was booked, fingerprinted, and released on bond, authorities realized that "Coster" was really Musica. His bond was revoked, and he committed suicide before he could be rearrested.

The McKesson and Robbins scandal led to major corporate governance and auditing reforms. The SEC required that public companies have audit committees of outside directors and that the appointment of auditors be approved by the shareholders. The American Institute of Accountants, now the American Institute of Certified Public Accountants, adopted audit standards requiring that auditors verify accounts receivable and inventory.
