= PSS World Medical =

Distributor of medical products

PSS World Medical, Inc.
- "The customer is everything"
- Company type: Public (Nasdaq: PSSI)
- Industry: Health care Wholesalers
- Founded: 1983
- Headquarters: Jacksonville, Florida, U.S.
- Key people: Gary A. Corless, President and CEO; David M. Bronson, CFO
- Products: Medical equipment and supplies
- Revenue: $1.86 billion (2008)
- Number of employees: 3,593
- Website: Physician Sales & Service; PSS World Medical

PSS World Medical, Inc. was an American distributor of medical products, equipment, billing services and pharmaceutical related products to non-hospital healthcare providers. In 2008, the company celebrated its 25th year in business and was named to Forbes 400 Best Big Companies list for the second time. In 2013, the company was purchased by the McKesson Corporation and dissolved. The organization also ranked number 965 on the 2008 Fortune 1000 list of largest businesses, up from 980 the prior year.

== History ==
PSS division logo

The company, based in Jacksonville, Florida, began in 1983 with the physician business, now called the Physician Sales & Service (PSS) division, as a distributor of medical supplies, diagnostic equipment, and pharmaceutical related products to primary care office-based physicians in the United States. According to The Florida Times-Union, "PSS entered the radiology and imaging equipment distribution business by acquiring Jacksonville-based Diagnostic Imaging, Inc" in 1996.

PSS division logo

The acquisition of Gulf South Medical Supply Inc. was completed in early 1998 for $661 million and expanded PSSWM's target customer group to include long-term care and assisted living facilities, home health care and hospice providers.

On February 22, 2013, McKesson Corporation (NYSE: MCK) announced that it completed the acquisition of PSS World Medical, Inc. for a total purchase price of approximately $2.1 billion, acquiring all outstanding shares of PSS World Medical for $29.00 per share in cash.

According to The Florida Times-Union, Physician Sales and Service Inc. "officially changed its corporate name" in March, 1998 to PSS World Medical Inc. (PSSWM) "to reflect...[the company's] expansion into multiple medical distribution sectors."

In 1998 a book, Faster Company: Building the World's Nuttiest, Turn-on-a-Dime, Home-Grown, Billion-Dollar Business, was published after being written by Founder and then CEO, Patrick Kelly.

Fisher Scientific announced its intention to buy PSSWM for $746.9 million in June, 2000 to increase its sales of medical products to doctors and nursing homes. Investors did not like the plan, and stock prices for both companies declined. On September 5, 2000, Fisher backed out of the deal and both companies announced that the "transaction is not in the best interest of their respective shareholders."

Diagnostic Imaging acquired California-based Intra-Trade Medical Corp. and QA Processor Service; New York-based Vanguard Imaging; and Florida-based Palm Beach X-Ray Company in 1999 with the expressed hope of raising annual revenue by $45 million. However, PSSWM restructured the company's debt in 2000 and DI lost money for two years. In late 2002, PSSWM announced a $115 million deal to sell its Diagnostic Imaging subsidiary to a venture capital firm that will continue operating the imaging business based in Jacksonville.

== Current operations ==
The company has over 800 sales consultants who work through 39 full-service distribution centers providing coverage throughout the United States. As a single source for medical inventory needs, PSS carries over 55,000 different medical products, (70% supplies, 20% equipment, and 10% pharmaceuticals), representing over 1,000 major manufacturers.
