= Allen Lloyd =

British businessman (born 1949)

- Born: Allen John Lloyd; 9 May 1949 (age 77); Coventry, United Kingdom
- Occupation: Businessman
- Known for: Founder, LloydsPharmacy
- Spouse: Marilyn Lloyd

Allen John Lloyd (born 9 May 1949) is a British businessman, who was the founder of LloydsPharmacy, a British pharmacy company, with more than 1,600 pharmacies, and around 17,000 staff.

== Personal life ==
Allen John Lloyd was born in May 1949, the son of a newsagent from Coventry. As teenager, he took a Saturday job in a Coventry branch of Timothy Whites and studied pharmacy at Leicester Polytechnic.

== Career ==
He started as a pharmacist working for Boots the Chemist, but when he was told that he was "not management material", he decided to start his own business.

Lloyds Chemist began in 1973 when Allen Lloyd purchased his first pharmacy in Polesworth, Warwickshire, England. In 1997, the German chain Celesio (previously called GEHE AG) bought Lloyds Chemists PLC, which at the time had 902 pharmacies, for £684 million against competition from rival Unichem.

Lloyd made about £34 million, and his wife Marilyn made £13.5 million earlier in May 1996, when she sold her stake. His brother Peter also had a stake.

== Personal life ==
He is married to Marilyn Lloyd. In May 1996, she sold her entire holding of three 3 million shares at 450p per share.

He was a Jaguar competition driver for 25 years, and gave a £5 million collection of 50 classic Jaguar cars for display at the Jaguar Heritage Trust.

== 24 Hours of Le Mans results ==
Year	Team	Co-Drivers	Car	Class	Laps	Pos.	Class Pos.
1997	(United States) Saleen-Allen Speedlab	(United Kingdom) Rob Schirle (United Kingdom) David Warnock	Saleen Mustang RRR	GT2	28	DNF	DNF
