= AAH Pharmaceuticals =

UK pharmaceutical wholesaler

Coordinates: 52.435227°N 1.434435°W

AAH Pharmaceuticals Limited
- Formerly: Mawson & Proctor Pharmaceuticals Limited (1912–1987)
- Type: Subsidiary
- Industry: Pharmaceuticals and healthcare
- Predecessor: Amalgamated Anthracite Holdings Limited
- Founded: 27 July 1912; 114 years ago
- Headquarters: Warwick, England, United Kingdom
- Number of locations: 13 depots
- Area served: United Kingdom
- Key people: David Bound (CEO); Brian Chambers (CCO); John Clark (COO)
- Revenue: ▼£2,947,500,000 (2025); ▼£3,070,200,000 (2024)
- Net income: ▼£35,095,000 (2025); ▲£61,110,000 (2024)
- Total assets: ▼£57,909,000 (2025); ▼£495,189,000 (2024)
- Total equity: ▼£136,737,000 (2025); ▲£581,216,000 (2024)
- Owner: Hallo Healthcare Group
- Number of employees: ▼2,787 (2025); ▲2,831 (2024)
- Parent: Admenta Holdings Limited (2016–2023); Admenta UK Limited (2023–present)
- Subsidiaries: Sangers (Northern Ireland) Limited; Barclays Pharmaceuticals Limited; Pharmagen Limited; AAH Builders Supplies Limited (dormant); (2025)
- Website: aah.co.uk

AAH Pharmaceuticals Limited is a pharmaceutical wholesaler in the United Kingdom. Originally formed in 1892 as a company selling solid fuels in South Wales, it was floated on the stock exchange in 1923. It diversified into pharmaceuticals in the 1970s. The company at one time was the leader in distributing drugs in the United Kingdom, have a 40% share in 2009.

== History ==
AAH originated in 1892, when Cleeves Company was formed in Wales, owning about 7,000 acres of land. It merged with two local companies, Gurnos and Gellveeidrim, to form Amalgamated Anthracite Collieries Limited. The formation of Amalgamated Anthracite and competitor United Anthracite in 1923 marked the end of an era of small firms in the Welsh coal industry. As of 1928, Amalgamated Anthracite had become the dominant coal producer in Wales, controlling about 75% of production capacity by 1933. In the 1930s, Amalgamated Anthracite was unusual in selling coal through its own agents rather than through coal brokers.

In 1954, it was agreed to change the company name to Amalgamated Anthracite Holdings Limited (AAH). In early 1971 the company abbreviated its name to AAH Limited. The company diversified after the collapse of English coal production in the 1920s to include health services, building materials, transport, warehousing and environmental services (landscape conservation and waste disposal).

The Chairman of the company in the 1920s was Alfred Mond, 1st Baron Melchett, and the firm was floated on the Stock Exchange on 29 June 1923, having been registered as a public company on 16 June 1923. The registered office was 29/30 King Street, Cheapside, London. Amalgamated Anthracite Collieries Limited held its first company meeting on 5 September 1923 at the Cannon Street Hotel.

From mid-1925 to at least the end of 1926, all coal mining activities in England had ceased, resulting in major financial problems for the industry. This was a driving force behind the eventual merger with United Anthracite Collieries Limited. On 1 July 1927, the company merged with United to become known as A.A.C Anthracite, based at 120 Fenchurch Street.

In 1976, AAH sold off its interests in fuel and building materials. Healthcare services became the company's main business activity. AAH expanded its pharmaceutical interest by taking over a large number of businesses including Chemists Holding and Hills Pharmaceuticals.

AAH Limited became a constituent company of AAH Holdings in 1981, based in London. In 1985 the headquarters of AAH Holdings plc moved to the south of Lincoln. By the late 1980s, when based in Lincoln, the holding company was turning over £1 billion, though the turnover for the pharmaceutical section was only in the range of £20 million.

In 1985 AAH acquired pharmaceutical wholesaler Vestric Limited from Glaxo P.L.C., which continued the company's growth and led to the formation of AAH Pharmaceuticals Limited.

As of 1990, the firm's Chairman was Dr. Peter Worling. In 1991, AAH arranged to distribute drugs marketed by ICI to hospitals in Britain, while ICI retained distribution logistics to pharmacies in the country.

In 1999 the headquarters moved to Coventry, where it remains as of 2023.

As of late 2000, the company was referred to as "the British wholesale and distribution arm of ... Gehe AG". By 2007, the company was "part of the German drug wholesaler Celesio". AAH entered into a partnership with Alliance Boots in 2007 for exclusive distribution of AstraZeneca products in the United Kingdom, activities slated to begin in 2008. This deal, alongside Pfizer's contemporaneous drug distribution deal with Unichem, was controversial and came under UK government scrutiny. AAH had in the 1990s been sole distributor of drugs from ICI Pharmaceuticals, a predecessor of AstraZeneca.

In April 2022, McKesson's UK businesses – including LloydsPharmacy, the wholesaler AAH, and a travel health service – were purchased by the Aurelius Group.

== Branches ==
The AAH group has several branches. The Enterprise branch sells health and beauty products to over 5,000 independent pharmacies in the UK. The Trident branch is a shortline supplier to independent pharmacies in the UK.

It has 14 depots around the UK including locations in London, Birmingham, Liverpool, Scotland and Northern Ireland.

== See also ==
- List of pharmaceutical manufacturers in the United Kingdom
