= Phillip Musica =

Italian-born American fraudster

Philip Musica
- Born: Philip Mariano Fausto Musica; 1877; Naples, Italy
- Died: December 16, 1938 (aged 60–61); Fairfield, Connecticut, U.S.
- Cause of death: Suicidal gunshot
- Other name: F. Donald Coster
- Occupation: Swindler

Philip Mariano Fausto Musica (1877 – December 16, 1938), also known as F. Donald Coster, was an Italian swindler whose criminal career spanned parts of three decades. His various crimes included tax fraud, bank fraud, and bootlegging. However, he is best known as the mastermind of the McKesson and Robbins scandal in 1938, one of the largest financial scandals ever perpetuated by a single person.

== Early life ==
Musica was born in 1877 in Naples, Italy, to Antonio and Maria Musica. His family moved to New York City when he was seven years old. He grew up in Mulberry's Bend, a rough neighborhood in Little Italy. Philip would eventually have three brothers and a sister. As a boy, Musica admired Theodore Roosevelt, at the time the New York Police Department's hard-charging police commissioner. He followed Roosevelt's activities in the newspapers and attended his public speaking engagements. Musica started copying the commissioner's speech and mannerisms.

== First convictions for fraud ==
=== A. Musica and Son ===
Musica dropped out of school at the age of 14 to help out at his father's small grocery store, A. Musica and Son. Within two years, he was running the store. He soon left day-to-day operations to his younger brother Arthur while turning his own attention to building an import-export operation. By importing cheese, olive oil, and spices directly from Italy (as opposed to using a middleman), he was able to underprice his competitors. Within a few years, A. Musica and Son was one of the largest importers of Italian food in New York, grossing a half-million dollars a year. The Musicas moved to a home in Bay Ridge in Brooklyn and became leaders of the city's Italian community.

There was a dark secret to the store's success, however. Musica bribed dock officials to replace the real bills of lading with phony ones listing the weights of their shipments as substantially lighter than they really were. The unpaid tariffs grew to astronomical proportions when the Musicas increased their orders. Combined with the lower prices they paid for importing directly, they substantially outsold all their competitors in Little Italy.

In 1909, Mayor George B. McClellan Jr. began a drive to clean up the East River waterfront. Police soon discovered the fraud, and Philip and Antonio Musica were arrested for tax evasion, tax fraud, and bribery. Musica pleaded guilty in return for having the charges against his father dropped (even though his father had signed several of the phony invoices) and served a year in jail. However, President William Howard Taft pardoned him after only six months.

=== U.S. Hair ===
Not long after getting out of jail, Musica founded the United States Hair Company, ostensibly to sell hairpieces that fashionable women of the day used to create elaborate hairstyles. Good-quality hair sold for as much as $80 a pound. Musica had his mother gather up nearly worthless sweepings from barbershop floors. He then put them in crates with a layer of expensive hair on top. The money was soon rolling in again, and Musica moved his family to a larger house in Bay Ridge. He also bought a suite at the Knickerbocker Hotel.

Musica sent his mother to Italy with the ostensible purpose of getting loans to finance the shipment of long strands of human hair across the Atlantic. The bankers bought the story, and Musica soon set up satellite offices around the world. However, these were nothing more than maildrops for the paper trail to support the existence of the company's nonexistent inventory. In July 1912, U.S. Hair was capitalized at $2 million, with $600,000 in assets—mostly human hair located abroad. Three months later, Musica took the company public, and it was listed on the Curb Exchange. The original price of $2 a share jumped to $10, making Musica an instant millionaire.

Then just as fast as Musica rose, he fell—and this time almost as ignobly as he had three years before. By the time U.S. Hair went public, it was $500,000 in arrears to several banks. Two British banks got suspicious of U.S. Hair's financing and refused to honor some company drafts, sending U.S. Hair stock into a tailspin. To get as much money as possible out of the company before being unmasked, Musica sought a $370,000 loan from Bank of Manhattan (now part of JPMorgan Chase), pledging 216 crates of hair as collateral. However, a bank clerk discovered a bill of lading for Musica's collateral had been altered. Suspicious bank representatives went to the piers to inspect the hair and discovered that the crates held only a small layer of valuable hair. The rest of the contents were nearly worthless ends and short pieces. The total value of the contents in the warehouse was about $250.

Musica got word that the bank had alerted federal authorities and proceeded to strip his Bay Ridge home of virtually everything of value. The Musica family fled to various cities on the East Coast before meeting in New Orleans. They got on a ship, intending to escape to Panama, but private detective William J. Burns was able to track them down by following a $12 steamer trunk Philip had bought at the Knickerbocker. Musica pleaded guilty in return for the dismissal of all charges against his family, claiming he'd been bilked by two European firms. Although the banks only recovered $70,000 of the $600,000 he'd swindled from them, he was able to curry favor with the authorities by informing on other inmates at The Tombs. Finally, in 1916, he was given a suspended sentence and released.

He was then hired as a special investigator with the New York State Attorney General's office under the alias William Johnson. He spent most of the next three years chasing down suspected German spies and draft dodgers. However, his career ended when he tried to implicate William Randolph Hearst as a German collaborator. Musica was apparently trying to get back at Hearst for his unflattering coverage of the U.S. Hair scandal.

== First bootlegging venture ==
In 1920, after briefly going into the poultry business, Musica founded the Adelphi Pharmaceutical Manufacturing Company, under the alias Frank D. Costa, with Joseph Brandino as his partner. Its nominal business was the manufacture of a hair tonic called "Dandrofuge" and cosmetics. In truth, it was a front for a bootlegging venture. In those days, hair tonic and cosmetics used large quantities of alcohol. Under the Prohibition laws, access to alcohol was strictly controlled, and Musica, as Costa, obtained a permit to draw 5,000 gallons of raw alcohol per month.

Unlike U.S. Hair, Adelphi's business was very real. However, the great majority of Musica's profits came from bootleggers who bought his tonic in large quantities and distilled out the alcohol to make beer and liquor. With the high premiums earned from the bootleggers, Musica was once again rolling in money. He kept two sets of books—a phony one showing sales at the normal competitive price and a real one to account for the sales to bootleggers. Operating as a doctor, Musica was able to secure a permit to import 5,000 gallons of raw alcohol per month.

Adelphi was shut down in 1923 after telling the Treasury that Brandino had been abusing the permit. Three years earlier, Musica had turned state's evidence against Brandino after the two were arrested for a Prohibition violation.

== McKesson and Robbins scandal ==
=== Girard & Co. ===
Using the proceeds from Adelphi, Musica moved to the tiny suburb of Mount Vernon, New York in 1923, where he set up Girard & Co., another company that made Dandrofuge tonic. He also legally changed his name to Frank Donald Coster, or F. Donald Coster. He billed himself as a native of Washington, D.C., with an M.D. and Ph.D. from the University of Heidelberg. He claimed to have practiced medicine for only three years before going into business.

Like Adelphi's business, Girard's hair tonic business was very real, but most of its profits were generated from bootleggers, who simply bought Coster's tonic in large quantities and distilled out the alcohol to make booze. The bootleggers paid far higher premiums than the drugstores that made up Girard's legitimate customer base. One of his biggest customers was Dutch Schultz.

As in the past, Coster brought his family in on this latest scam. He claimed to be running the company for the widow and sister of Horace Girard—roles played by his mother and sister Grace, respectively. His brother Arthur, under the alias George Vernard, set up W.W. Smith & Co. On paper, it was a sales agency that handled a large volume of Girard orders. In truth, it was nothing more than a "letter-writing plant" that generated fake purchase orders and mailed them to Girard. Another brother, Robert, under the alias Robert Dietrich, was Girard's head of shipping. He forged the necessary documents to make it look like the inventory had actually been shipped out. Another brother, George, under the alias George Dietrich, served as company treasurer and moved money between accounts to make it look like the "customers" had paid for the "orders."

To lend his scheme greater legitimacy, Coster asked Price Waterhouse to audit Girard & Co. In those days, auditors didn't check inventories, but only checked a company's books and supporting documents. Relying entirely on fraudulent documents provided by Girard, Price Waterhouse listed the company as having $1.1 million in sales, profits of $250,000 and assets of $295,000. When it examined W. W. Smith & Co., Girard's biggest customer, Price Waterhouse relied on the faked purchase orders as well as a forged report from Dun & Company (now part of Dun & Bradstreet) stating that W. W. Smith was worth $7 million.

The scheme succeeded with flying colors, and Coster soon moved the company to Fairfield, Connecticut. Also, he and his wife Carol (whom he had married after wrecking her previous marriage to a business associate) moved to an 18-room, seven-acre estate in Fairfield. While it was an open secret that Girard was really a bootlegging operation—in fact, it was the biggest bootleg distributor on the East Coast—Coster's ties to Connecticut politics and business, as well as his talent for bribery, kept any investigations from going anywhere.

=== Buying McKesson ===
Coster wanted to become a major player on Wall Street and saw his chance when he found out that McKesson & Robbins, a well-respected drugmaker and distributor, was up for sale. He also wanted to avert any suspicion of his real activities. In 1926, he merged Girard & Co. with McKesson for $1 million. While McKesson was the surviving company, Coster became the merged company's president.

The McKesson purchase gave Coster an even larger front for his bootlegging operation. However, he also pumped up McKesson's legitimate business and led a drive to open up several foreign markets. During his first full year as company president, 1927, he incorporated a Canadian subsidiary to trade in crude drugs. Unlike the rest of the company, only Coster and George Dietrich—better known as George Musica—had access to the accounts of this new division. That year, the company turned a $600,000 profit.

Coster grew even richer, buying a 28-room mansion in Fairfield, a yacht, racing horses, a stable of cars, and a castle in Monroe, Connecticut. His machine continued to roll through the Great Depression until by 1937, McKesson was the third-largest drug company in the world. However, he remained an intensely private man, in part out of fear of being unmasked. For instance, he turned down an offer to run for president in 1936 on the Republican ticket.

=== Collapse ===
Coster's downfall began in 1937, when McKesson's board ordered him to convert $2 million of his crude drugs into cash to build up profits and reduce outstanding debt. Coster responded with a demand that the firm obtain a $3 million loan "for improvements."

Julian Thompson, the company's treasurer, was puzzled by this demand. He figured a firm as successful as McKesson shouldn't need to obtain an outside loan. Several aspects of the company's arrangement with W. W. Smith and Co.--which had been inherited from the Girard merger—also troubled him. On a hunch, he contacted Dun & Bradstreet, who informed him W. W. Smith's report was a forgery. He also discovered that the crude-drug division was more or less nonexistent and that, in 1929, Coster had looted the division of $640,000 to cover losses on the stock market. Altogether, Thompson discovered Coster had stolen $3 million from McKesson over the years.

When Thompson confronted Coster with his findings, Coster accused him of "trying to wreck this company." He then tried to place the company in equity receivership to throw Thompson off the scent long enough to cover up the fraud. However, Thompson countered by having the board file for bankruptcy protection under the Chandler Act. After an investigation by the Securities and Exchange Commission, Coster, Vernard, and George Dietrich were arrested and released on bail on December 13.

An investigator with the New York state attorney general's office thought he recognized Coster's face as that of former investigator William Johnson—the alias Musica had used after his release from The Tombs. A check revealed Coster's fingerprints to be an exact match to those of Musica. At a midnight press conference on December 15, officials dropped a bombshell—F. Donald Coster, the now-disgraced drug tycoon, was really two-time convicted fraudster Philip Musica.

Musica got word that he'd been unmasked and that federal marshals were on their way to arrest him. Unwilling to face almost certain conviction and a long prison term, he locked himself in the bathroom and shot himself in the head on the morning of December 16. He was careful to stand in a way that when he fell into a large marble bathtub, none of his blood stained the carpet on the floor.

== Nazi Propaganda ==
Musica was mentioned in the 1938 Nazi pamphlet Roosevelt verrät Amerika! (Roosevelt Betrays America!) by Dr. Robert Ley. He wrote "The Coster-Musica scandal aroused considerable excitement in the American business world at the end of 1938. Coster-Musica had carried out swindles on a widespread scale, including drug smuggling, weapons sales, and crooked dealings, and was a member of many prominent clubs. Coster-Musica had been in jail for fraud as early as 1906. He was convicted in a huge financial scandal in 1913. Given his connections to 'high society,' he did not serve time in prison. His company collapsed when the fraud was discovered. 13,500 stockholders lost over $100 million. He committed suicide because he feared his well-placed friends were no longer able to protect him from the wrath of those he had cheated."
