= Republic Drug Store =

Pharmacy in Republic, Washington, US

Coordinates: 48°38′52″N 118°44′16″W

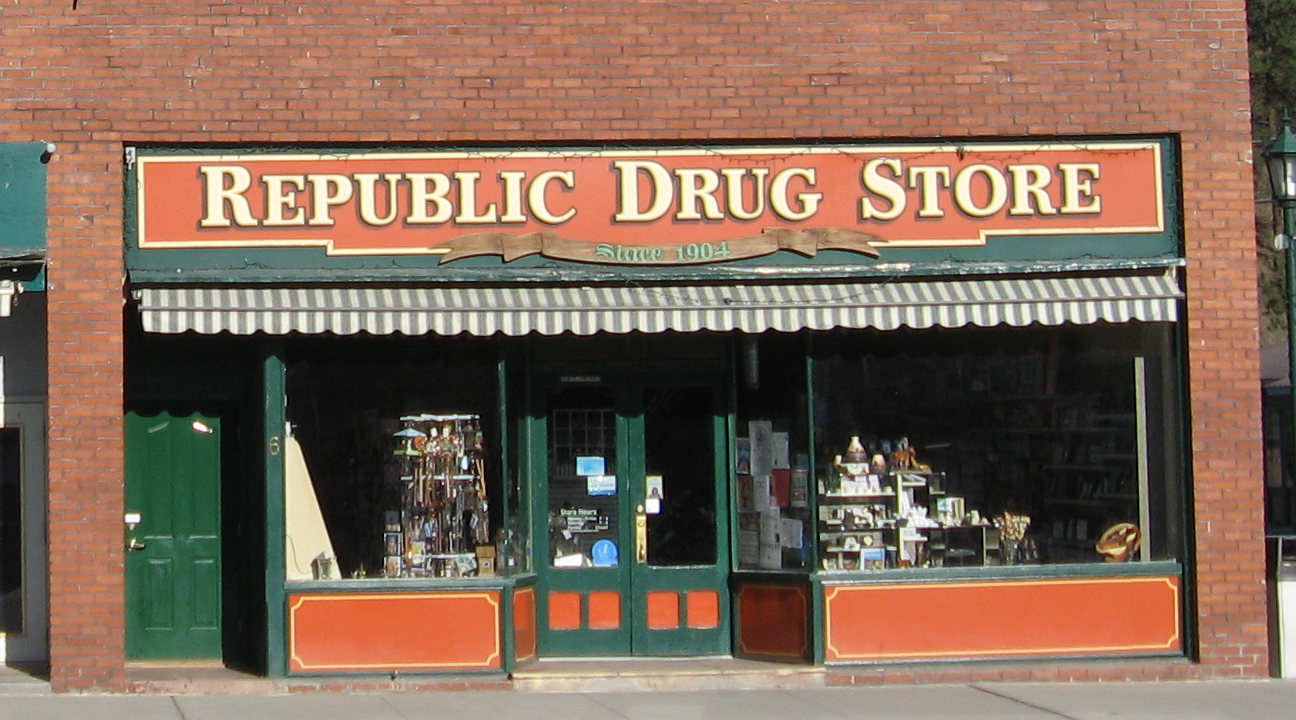
- Store-front in 2009
- Company type: Subsidiary
- Industry: retail/pharmacy
- Founded: 1904 in Republic, Washington, US
- Founder: Jesse "John" Slagle
- Headquarters: 36 Klondike Road, Republic, Washington, United States
- Number of locations: 1
- Area served: Northern Ferry County, Washington
- Products: Drug store, pharmacy, retail
- Parent: Ferry County Health District
- Website: fcphd.org/RDS.html

The Republic Drug Store is a pharmacy located in Republic, Washington, United States. The original drug store burned down in 1917 from a suspected arson, and the current building was built and finished by 1918. In 2003, it was thought to be Washington state's oldest family-operated drug store still in business. The store was sold to the Ferry County Hospital District in 2021. In 2023 the store was at the center of a Controlled Substances Act settlement between the hospital district and the United States District Court for the Eastern District of Washington.

== History ==
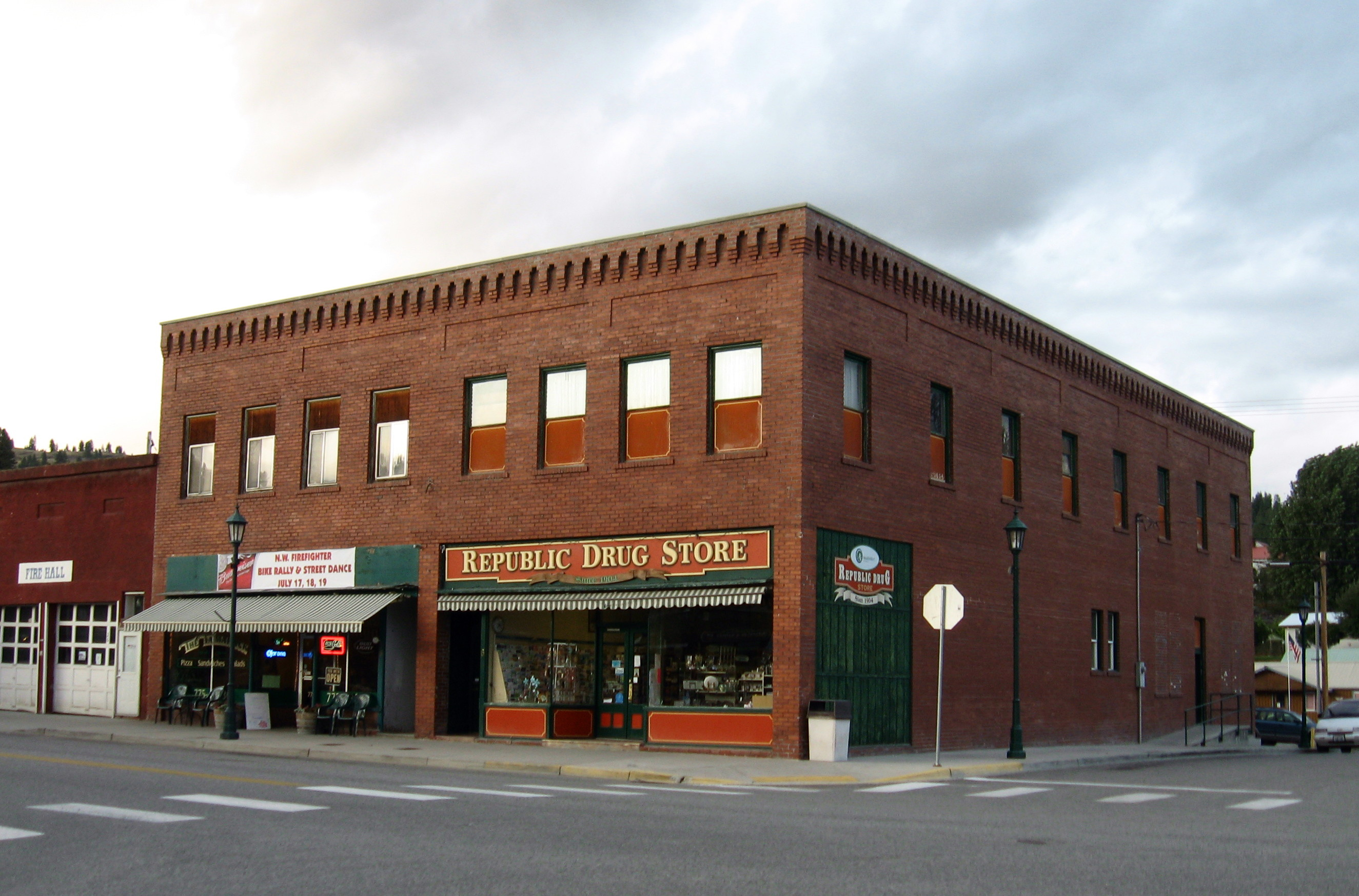
1918 Slagle building in 2009

Jesse "John" Slagle arrived in Republic in 1904, having been sent by the Stewart & Holms Wholesale Drug Company, his employer at the time, with instructions to liquidate a drugstore that was part of an estate. After arrival, Slagle was slated to only stay long enough to deal with the estate, a period of three months. However Slagle opted to take the estate goods, plus the buy out of a formerly competing pharmacy from its elderly proprietor, and combine the two into a single pharmacy. With the stores inventories combined, the new venture was named the Republic Drug Store.

=== Slagle Brothers ===
With the store established, Slagle asked his brother to move to Republic to help with the store and his brother Jeff H. Slagle agreed. After a few years they decided to expand, and to that end in 1908 they bought out the pharmacy in Kettle Falls. The former druggist had operated the store for 18 years, and sold so he could retire. The two stores were run in conjunction for just over 5 years before the brothers announced they were dissolving their partnership. In 1914 it was announced that "The Slagle Bro's" partnership would end by mutual consent of both brothers. Jesse would continue running the Republic Drug Store while Jeff would take over the Kettle Falls Drug Company.

=== 1917 arson ===
The Republic store was the target of arson on September 4, 1917. While performing rounds the city marshal observed through the front windows an explosion occurred at the back of the shop. The resulting fire quickly grew to envelop seven buildings along the block. While all seven buildings were lost, only the stock of the drug store was also lost, with $7,000 (equivalent to about $171,800 in 2024) to $8,000 (equivalent to about $196,300 in 2024) of merchandise burned. The fire was finally extinguished with help from the one working fire pump the city had. After the Republic fires of 1917 Slagle moved the store location to its current spot and rebuilt in a two-story brick building which was completed soon after the fire in 1917–1918.

=== 1937 vault upgrade ===
It was reported on October 3 that john Slagle had upgraded his vault storage with the addition of 50 unit safety deposit boxes. The boxes are part of a single case structure built from strong steel panels.

=== 1956 burglary ===
The store suffered a significant burglary on the morning of September 15, 1956, with looters targeting the drug selection and liquor inventory plus cash from the till. The value of stolen goods and cash at the time was listed as US$1,020 (equivalent to about $11,800 in 2024), all of which was insured. Dick and Maury, co-owning the store at that time, had worked late that night and not left the premises until sometime after midnight. The break-in was estimated to happen around 3 am, with access to the store via a side door. Among the inventory listed as stolen were cigarettes, electric shavers, whiskey, and writing utensils, however the store vault was not touched. It is likely a truck was used to transport the goods away. Both the Spokane Police and Spokane County Sheriff were notified via radio when the break-in was reported. Investigations were conducted by both the Ferry County Sheriffs Department and the Washington State Liquor Control Board.

=== Succession ===
When he retired in 1947 Jesse passed the store to his sons David, Maurice "Maury", and Richard "Dick" Slagle. Dick and Maury Slagle operated the store jointly before turning it over to Maury's son and daughter-in-law, Robert "Rob" and Patty Slagle. In 2003 it was thought to be the oldest continually family run drugstore in the state of Washington. The store was also the second-oldest operating business in Republic, having started four years after the founding of Anderson's Grocery in the summer of 1900. Since around the time of World War I, the Drugstore has been the only pharmacy serving in Ferry County, and after 1947, it was also the only pharmacy serving the hospital.

=== 2002 Medicaid prices ===
In 2002, Washington proposed lowering the reimbursement payments to pharmacists who fulfill Medicaid prescriptions. The lower prices would have forced many pharmacies like the Republic Drug Store to turn away Medicaid prescriptions, stated Patty Slagle. The state was looking at the option of cutting the reimbursement budget of Washington anywhere from $20 million to $71 million, and if they had been implemented, it would have made the cost of Medicaid refills for Republic Drug Store more expensive than the reimbursement. At the time, Slagle noted over half the prescriptions processed by Republic Drug were through Medicaid, and the store would need to consider turning patients away, which would result in a drive of anywhere from 80–100 mi (130–160 km) to reach another pharmacy.

=== 2021 sale ===
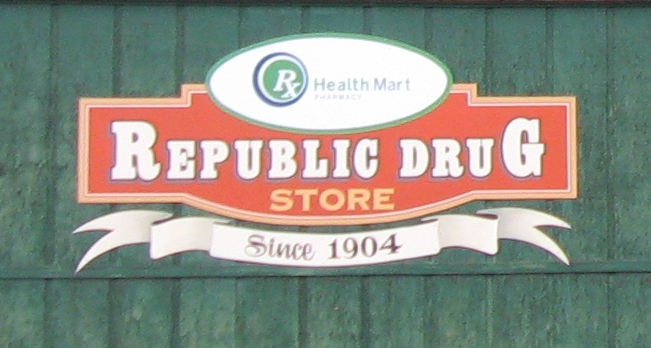
2009 sign with Health Mart endorsement

The family ownership of the Republic Drug Store ended in 2021 when owners Rob and Patty finalized sale to the Ferry County Hospital District in January 2021. The drug store has been transitioned to ownership and oversight of the hospital district and maintains its franchise membership with Health Mart.

== Department of Justice investigation ==
Initial opioid prescription rate reporting in a 2020 Washington Post noted that small pharmacies may have larger than average stock of drugs, many of the pills were shunted to the black market instead of legal use. Based on a Drug Enforcement Administration (DEA) database, the Republic Drug Store was reported for receiving a "large number of pills for county", having been shipped 2,681,690 oxycodone and hydrocodone pills between 2006 and 2014. The article noted this was enough for the quoted 1,409 people living within a 10 mi (16 km) radius of the store to each get 211 pills a year.

From October 6, 2017, to November 27, 2021, the drug store was placed under investigation by the Drug Enforcement Administration for its opiate handling practices. During the investigation, the DoJ recorded a number of "red flag" issues, as set out by the Controlled Substances Act that should have been seen and rectified by the attending pharmacist. The DEA defined the red flags as being indicators of potential for diversion or fraud, drug seeking, lack of medical needs, and potential for abuse or health risks. Among the issues found were prescriptions written by various individuals not legally allowed to write them. The individuals included people with suspended licenses due to prescription writing issues, retiree physicians, and a doctor without license to prescribe controlled substances at all, being a naturopathic practitioner.

Legally, onus is placed on both prescribing doctor and the pharmacist presented with the drug request to verify that any "red flags" is investigated and rectified before a drug is dispensed. The DEA did not feel the store took the steps required on most "red flags", and a case was brought by United States District Court for the Eastern District of Washington attorneys. In 2023, the Ferry County Hospital District came to an agreement with the Department of Justice attorneys under Vanessa Waldref for the recorded violations. When asked about the case, the hospital chief executive officer stated she felt the case was "lacking", but also noted the store had not been able to supply any evidence of clearing red flags. The hospital district agreed to take full responsibility for the drug stores actions before and after purchase. The hospital district entered into an agreement with the DoJ to increase training of the store staff and be subject to stock audits on a quarterly basis. The stores controlled substance practices and policies were to be updated and a fine of US$15,000 (equivalent to about $15,500 in 2024) paid to the state.

== Building ==
The drug store building as of 2019 still featured original hand cranked awnings, over the original store front and the pressed tin ceiling. Due to the preserved nature of the turn-of-the-century building, the Drug Store has been identified by Washington Filmworks as a potential film location.
