= Proxim =

Canadian pharmacy chain

- Type: Subsidiary
- Founded: 2004 (Groupe PharmEssor); 2006 (Proxim banner)
- Headquarters: Saint-Laurent, Montreal, Quebec
- Number of locations: about 270 (2015)
- Key people: Erick Gagné (president and CEO)
- Products: Pharmacy, retail
- Parent: McKesson Canada
- Website: www.groupeproxim.ca

Proxim is a Canadian banner of pharmacies owned by independent pharmacists in Quebec. It was created in 2006 by Groupe PharmEssor, which also operates the Proximed banner of smaller pharmacies, and has belonged to McKesson Canada since 2008. In 2015 the network had some 270 pharmacies, most of them in Quebec.

The affiliated pharmacies operate under the responsibility of their owners. Proxim's head office is located at 4705 Dobrin Street in the Saint-Laurent borough of Montreal. By October 2022, Erick Gagné was president and chief executive officer of Proxim and Uniprix.

A compliance program linking McKesson Canada to Proxim pharmacists was the subject of regulatory investigations that concluded in 2013 and 2015.

== History ==
The Essaim pharmacy group, founded by Guy M. Papillon, was established in 1984. In March 2003 it had about 175 pharmacies, around thirty of them in Ontario and the Maritimes, when it signed a memorandum of understanding to merge with Uniprix under the name Unipharm; the two chains ended the talks in July 2003. On September 1, 2004, Groupe Essaim and Gestion Santé Services Obonsoins formally amalgamated to form Groupe PharmEssor.

In 2006 the Essaim and Obonsoins pharmacies were brought together under a single new banner, Proxim, a name drawn from the word "proximity". In 2009 Proxim's president, Michel Chartrand, said that brand recognition and sales had improved since 2006, but that the banner had not recruited many new independent pharmacies.

On July 1, 2008, McKesson Canada acquired Groupe PharmEssor, owner of the Proxim and Proximed brands, which then had 270 independently owned pharmacies in Quebec. In April 2017 McKesson Canada agreed to buy Uniprix and said it would keep the Proxim banner and not merge the two chains. The acquisition gave McKesson Canada about 580 Proxim and Uniprix pharmacies, the largest pharmacy network in Quebec by number of outlets, ahead of the Jean Coutu Group (382). When the deal closed in September 2017, Alain Arel, president of Proxim, also became president of Uniprix. By October 2022 Erick Gagné was president and chief executive officer of Proxim and Uniprix.

== Operations ==
Proxim pharmacies are owned by independent pharmacists. In 2014 the stores averaged 2,800 square feet (260 m^{2}); the 186 Proxim pharmacies measured up to 4,000 square feet (370 m^{2}) and the 52 Proximed pharmacies, located next to medical clinics, 1,000 to 1,500 square feet (93 to 139 m^{2}). That year the banner had sales of C$800 million.

In 2014 the Atoma private label, designed by Proxim's team at McKesson's request, replaced Proxim's former Réservé label. As of 2026 Proxim pharmacies sell the Option+ private label.

Since 2016 Proxim has been the presenting sponsor of the Leucan Shaved Head Challenge, a fundraiser of the Quebec childhood cancer charity Leucan, which it has supported since 2011. According to Leucan, the Proxim network has given the charity more than C$1.6 million over the years. In Léger's 2026 WOW study of in-store customer experience in Quebec, Proxim ranked third among pharmacy banners, behind Brunet and Familiprix.

== Regulatory investigations ==
In 2013 McKesson Canada paid C$40 million to the Régie de l'assurance maladie du Québec (RAMQ), without admitting liability, at the end of an investigation into a compliance program linking the distributor to Proxim pharmacists; according to the RAMQ, the business model did not comply with the regulations in force. In February 2015 the syndic of the Ordre des pharmaciens du Québec, the province's professional order of pharmacists, was investigating about 200 Proxim pharmacists over benefits they allegedly received under this program, introduced in 2008; in January 2015 Proxim's management had announced that the program was abolished. In September 2015 the order announced the conciliation of 326 files concerning owner-pharmacists of the Proxim and Proximed banners, who agreed to pay a total of C$1,652,000 to the order.

== See also ==
- Community pharmacy
