= Charles M. Olcott =

American pharmacist and businessman

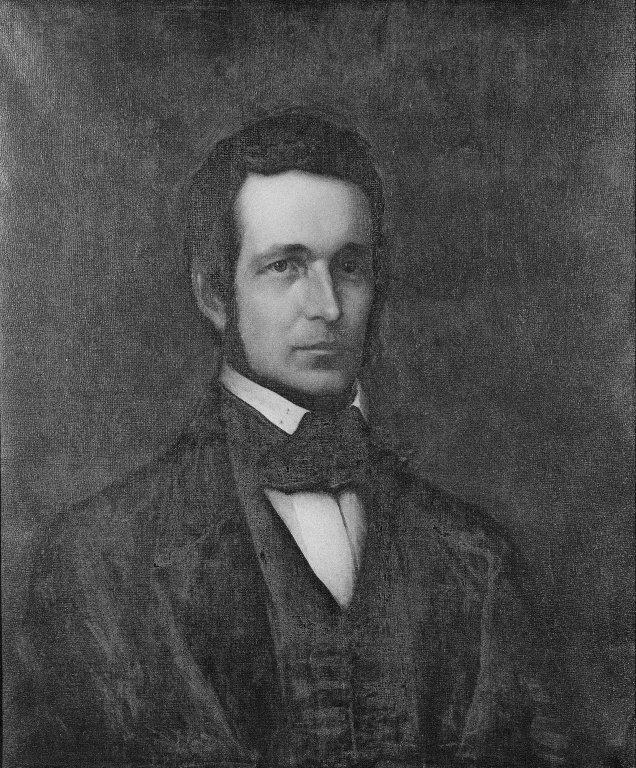
- Died: 1853
- Occupation: Apothecary
- Known for: founding McKesson Corporation

Charles M. Olcott (died 1853) was an American pharmacist. He is noted for co-founding the McKesson Corporation, the largest health care company in North America and ninth-largest company in the United States.

== Biography ==
Olcott was trained as an apothecary, which was the precursor of the modern pharmacist profession. After completing his education, he started working for a chemist and was also believed to have provided medical advice and even occasional surgery and midwifery.

Several years later, he was employed as a clerk for Warner, Prall, & Ray, the center of Jobbing Drug business in New York City. Olcott then started his own apothecary business, which turned into a successful semi-jobbing business located at the corner Madison and Catherine streets.

Together with John McKesson, Olcott founded Olcott & McKesson in 1833. Its headquarters was set up at 145 Maiden Lane, the center of Manhattan's wholesale district. It promoted itself as a business engaged in the import of medicine. The company was established after the partners bought out the stock and lease of a wholesaler who was about to retire. In the beginning, the company was involved in the wholesale of botanical-based drugs, including herbs and vegetable extracts. Later, the company also started providing therapeutic drugs and chemicals such as acids, elixirs, tinctures, and essential oils.

Olcott died in 1853.
