= Charles S. Olcott =

American non-fiction writer

Charles Sumner Olcott
- Born: 1864; Terre Haute, Indiana
- Died: May 4, 1935 (aged 70–71); Cambridge, Massachusetts
- Education: DePauw University
- Occupations: Non-fiction writer, and apparently also a photographer. His photographs were used as the basis of the illustrations in the 1913 Houghton Mifflin edition of "The House of Seven Gables."
- Children: 2 sons

Charles S. Olcott (1864 - May 4, 1935) was an American non-fiction writer. Born in Terre Haute, Indiana, he graduated from DePauw University and worked in publishing as the general manager of the private library of Houghton Mifflin. He was the author of four books, including a two-volume biography of President William McKinley.

== Selected works ==
- Olcott, Charles S. (1910). George Eliot: Scenes and People in her novels. New York: T. Y. Crowell & co. OCLC 3844186.
- Olcott, Charles S. (1913). The Country of Sir Walter Scott. Boston, Massachusetts: Houghton Mifflin. OCLC 1065419675.
- Olcott, Charles S. (1914). The Lure of the Camera. New York: Houghton Mifflin. OCLC 498836607.
- Olcott, Charles S. (1916). The Life of William McKinley. Boston: Houghton Mifflin. OCLC 734046343.
