= Ready, Set, PrEP =

American HIV program

Ready, Set, PrEP is a program of the U.S. Department of Health and Human Services (HHS) that provides free access to the HIV prevention medication PrEP for thousands of qualifying individuals. The program is a key component of Ending the HIV Epidemic: A Plan for America (EHE) initiative to expand access to PrEP and reduce new HIV diagnoses in the U.S.

== Background ==
During the State of the Union Address on February 5, 2019, the Donald Trump administration announced the operational plan EHE, which was developed by agencies across HHS to end the HIV epidemic and reduce the number of new HIV transmissions in the U.S. by 75% by 2025 and by 90% by 2030.

According to Robert Goldstein, MD, over 1 million people at risk for HIV in the United States may benefit from pre-exposure prophylaxis (PrEP) medications, but fewer than one in four receive it. To address the cost barriers to PrEP, HHS launched Ready, Set, PrEP in December 2019 with the goal of expanding access to those disproportionately impacted by HIV.

- While the number of new HIV diagnoses has declined significantly from their mid-1980s peak of 150,000, this decline has stalled, with an estimated 40,000 Americans newly diagnosed each year. Without intervention, another 400,000 Americans would be newly diagnosed over 10 years despite the available tools to prevent transmissions.
- About 1 in 7 people with HIV are unaware they have the virus.
- Black and Hispanic Americans make up 69% of all new HIV diagnoses.
- A disproportionately low percentage of Black and Hispanic men either are not aware of PrEP, have not discussed PrEP with a health care provider, or have not used PrEP within the past year.
- Fewer than 7% of women who could benefit from PrEP are using it.
- Stigma, fear, discrimination, and homophobia place many people at a higher risk for HIV.

== Distribution ==
In August 2020, HHS contracted TrialCard as a distribution partner to verify Ready, Set, PrEP participant eligibility, enrollments, maintain the network of participating pharmacies, and distribute the donated medications to uninsured participants. In early 2021, TrialCard will begin to offer mail-order delivery services for enrolled individuals.

=== Qualifications ===
The Ready, Set, PrEP program provides access to PrEP medications for free to people who qualify. To receive PrEP through the program, an individual must:

1. Test negative for HIV;
2. Have a valid prescription from their healthcare provider; and
3. Not have insurance that covers prescription drugs.

The costs of necessary clinic visits and lab test costs may vary depending on income and where the tests are given. It is recommended that those interested in the program speak with a healthcare provider to see if PrEP medication is the best option and to get a prescription.

=== Health Centers ===
HHS's Health Resources and Services Administration's Health Center program is working closely with healthcare professionals at more than 12,000 service sites and 1,400 health centers nationwide in order to provide HIV lab testing and access to PrEP medication. Anyone looking to find a clinic or provider that prescribes PrEP should use the locator tool or request a mail-order through participating pharmacies.

=== Pharmacy partners ===
A collective of over 24,000 pharmacies have partnered to donate their medication dispensing services to HHS in support of the Ready, Set, PrEP program and the EHE initiative. Combined, these donating pharmacies represent almost half of the pharmacies in the U.S., the District of Columbia, Puerto Rico, and the U.S. Virgin Islands. The partnership allows for program enrollees to fill prescriptions for PrEP medication at one of the participating pharmacies or by mail order for free.

=== Participating pharmacies ===
Acme; Albertsons; Amigos; Avita Pharmacy; Carrs; CVS Health; Haggen; Health Mart; Jewel-Osco; Market Street United; MedCart; Pavilions	Randalls; Rite Aid; Safeway; Sam's Club; Shaw's; Star Market; Tom Thumb; United Supermarkets; Vons; Walgreens; Walmart

== Campaigns ==
=== "I'm Ready" Campaign ===
Released during World AIDS Day 2020, the "I'm Ready" campaign is the latest addition to the Ready, Set, PrEP program. The campaign features the stories of people from a variety of backgrounds sharing their experience with PrEP, aiming to highlight the challenges facing communities disproportionately impacted by HIV. In addition to HIV prevention, the campaign covers HIV testing, viral suppression, and HIV stigma.

== See also ==
- U.S. Department of Health and Health Services
- HIV/AIDS in the United States
