= Ricardo García Posada Airport =

Ricardo García Posada Airport El Salvador Bajo Airport
- IATA: ESR; ICAO: SCES

Summary
- Airport type: Public
- Serves: El Salvador, Chile
- Elevation AMSL: 5,240 ft / 1,597 m
- Coordinates: 26°18′40″S 69°45′55″W

Map
- Location of airport in Chile

Runways
| Direction | Length | | Surface |
| Direction | m | ft | Surface |
|---|---|---|---|
| 09/27 | 2,308 | 7,572 | Asphalt |
- Sources: GCM Google Maps

Ricardo García Posada Airport (IATA: ESR, ICAO: SCES), formerly El Salvador Bajo Airport, is an airport serving the copper mining community of El Salvador, in the Atacama Region of Chile.

The airport is in the desert 15 kilometres (9.3 mi) southwest of El Salvador. The runway slopes upward to the east.

== See also ==
- Transport in Chile
- List of airports in Chile
