= Special Obtain =

In the UK Pharmaceutical business a Special Obtain is a product which is listed in the Chemist and Druggist Directory or Drug Tariff which is not stocked by the mainline wholesalers.

Typical items are:

- White List Appliances (i.e. Coloplast Ostomy products)
- Food Substances (i.e. Gluten free breads)
- Branded Generic drugs (i.e. Vennax)
- Named Patient Items (i.e. Nabilone Capsules)
- Borderline Substances (i.e. Acetylcysteine)
- Short Supply Products (i.e. Mediven Stockings)
- Made to Measure Hosiery
- Homeopathics
- Dressings, bandages & slings
- Cover creams
- Dermatology products e.g. silk vests
- Allergy products
- Compression products

In June 2013 the Daily Telegraph infiltrated reporters into the annual Pharmacy Congress to investigate malpractice in the market for Specials. These products are generally individually priced. In November 2013 the paper reported that "The prices of more than 20,000 drugs could have been artificially inflated, with backhanders paid to chemists who agreed to sell them" and that NHS Protect had mounted an investigation.
