= Uniprix =

Canadian pharmacy banner

- Type: Subsidiary
- Industry: Pharmacy, Retail
- Founded: 1977; 49 years ago
- Headquarters: Montreal, Quebec, Canada
- Products: Pharmacy and health products; Option+ private label
- Parent: McKesson Canada (2017–present)
- Website: www.uniprix.com

Uniprix, also known as Groupe Uniprix, is a Canadian pharmacy banner and group of independently owned pharmacies founded in 1977 and based in Montreal, Quebec. It operates in Quebec under three banners: Uniprix, Uniprix Santé and Uniprix Clinique. As of 2017 the group had about 330 pharmacies in Quebec, the third-largest pharmacy network in the province by number of stores, after the Jean Coutu Group (382) and Familiprix (358).

Uniprix sells products under the Option+ private label.

On April 12, 2017, McKesson Canada, a subsidiary of the U.S.-based McKesson that already owned the Proxim banner, reached an agreement to acquire Groupe Uniprix and its roughly 330 pharmacies. The group's pharmacist-shareholders approved the sale by 95 percent on May 16, 2017, and the transaction was completed on September 6, 2017.

With the addition of Uniprix to its existing Proxim banner, McKesson Canada became the largest retail pharmacy operator in Quebec by number of stores.
