= LloydsPharmacy =

British retail company

Lloyds Pharmacy Limited
- Type: Subsidiary
- Industry: Pharmaceuticals
- Founded: 1973
- Founder: Allen Lloyd
- Defunct: 26 November 2023
- Fate: Liquidation
- Headquarters: Coventry, England
- Services: Pharmacy
- Number of employees: 17,000
- Parent: Aurelius Group
- Website: lloydspharmacy.com

LloydsPharmacy was the trading name of Lloyds Pharmacy Ltd, a British pharmacy company, which was formed by a merger in 1998 and by 2021 was the second-largest community pharmacy company in the UK.

The company, which was owned by McKesson Corporation from 2014 and Aurelius Group from 2022, ceased trading in November 2023 and later entered voluntary liquidation. Some stores were closed and the remaining 1,054 were sold to new owners.

== Overview ==
The company was headquartered at Sapphire Court in the Walsgrave Triangle Business Park in Coventry, England. In 2021, Lloyds was the second-largest community pharmacy company in the UK.

In 2020–2021, revenue from its online pharmacy LloydsDirect was 731% more than the previous year, though there was a 9.6% decrease in turnover for the company as a whole. In March 2021, there were 1,351 LloydsPharmacy branches, decreased from 1,427 in 2020.

== History ==
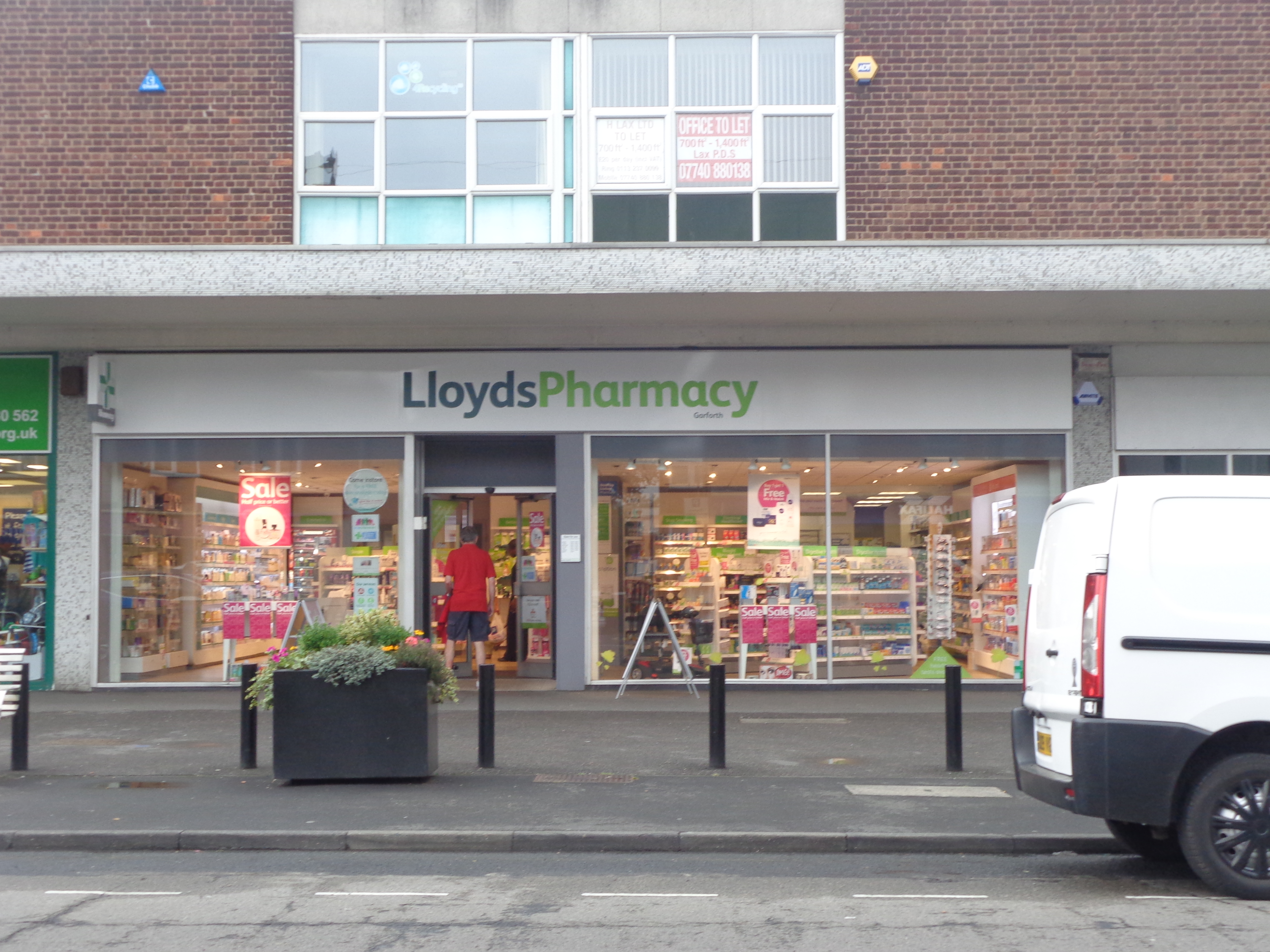
Lloyds Pharmacy, Garforth, Yorkshire, 2014

Lloyds Chemist began in 1973 when Allen Lloyd purchased his first pharmacy in Polesworth, Warwickshire, England, UK. It is estimated he made a £32 million fortune from the LloydsPharmacy empire.

The company was purchased by Celesio AG in 1997, and was merged with Celesio's existing UK subsidiary AAH Pharmaceuticals' Hills Pharmacy network to form a network of 1300 pharmacies. The merged company used the Lloyds Pharmacy name from January 1998. Celesio was bought in 2014 by American healthcare company McKesson.

In November 2013, the Daily Telegraph reported that "The prices of more than 20,000 drugs could have been artificially inflated, with backhanders paid to chemists who agreed to sell them." In particular it was alleged that Lloyds was charging the NHS £89.50 for packets of cod liver oil, when other suppliers could provide it for £3.15. NHS Protect had mounted an investigation.

In December 2013 it was involved in a case where Quantum Pharmaceutical was fined more than £380,000 by the Office of Fair Trading over a cartel arrangement in which it carved up some of a multimillion-pound market in prescription drugs for care homes with Lloyds Pharmacy.

In July 2015, Lloyd's announced the purchase of all 281 pharmacies in Sainsbury's supermarkets for £125 million in a deal that transferred all 2500 Sainsbury's pharmacy employees to the company. In December 2015, the sale was referred to the Competition and Markets Authority for investigation. The deal was approved and the outlets were rebranded as Lloyds. With the addition of Sainsbury’s pharmacies, there were around 1800 LloydsPharmacy branches around the UK, employing more than 19,000 people. In October 2017, Lloyds announced that it would close or sell 190 of its 1,600 shops in England and expand its use of digital channels.

In 2016, Lloyds made a €12 million settlement to the Irish Health Service Executive over a dispute of phased dispensing to medical card holders. Lloyds put a patient’s monthly medication into four separate trays, one for each seven-day period. The drugs were supplied to the patient in a single visit. This boosted Lloyds income by up to €600 per year for each medical card holder.

In June 2019, Lloyds acquired Echo, an online prescription fulfilment business in the UK, for an undisclosed sum.

In April 2022, McKesson's UK businesses – including LloydsPharmacy, the wholesaler AAH, and a travel health service – were purchased by the Aurelius Group. In January 2023, Lloyds announced that it would withdraw from all Sainsbury's in-store pharmacies during that year. The online prescription service LloydsDirect was sold to rival company Pharmacy2U in October 2023 for an undisclosed sum.

McKesson UK rebranded as Hallo Healthcare Group and in November 2023, confirmed the sale of its 1,054 LloydsPharmacy high street and community pharmacy branches to new owners, either individually or in regional groups. This saved 6,500 branch jobs and ensured that pharmacy services remain available in communities across the UK. Following this sale, Lloyds Pharmacy Ltd was no longer part of Hallo Healthcare Group or operating physical pharmacies. Expert Health acquired the rights to the Lloyds Pharmacy name and maintains an online presence.

In January 2024, it was confirmed that Lloyds Pharmacy Ltd had been placed into liquidation with debts of £293 million (£228 million of which was owed to former parent Admenta UK).

== See also ==
- List of pharmacies
