= Electronic Staff Record =

The Electronic Staff Record or ESR is an Oracle-based human resources and payroll database system currently used by 586 units of the National Health Service (NHS) in England and Wales to manage the payroll for 1.2 million NHS staff members. The Electronic Staff Record application is managed by IBM for the NHS.

== Implementation ==
Starting in 2006, groups of around 50 units were implemented every two months. Implementation of ESR was completed in March 2008 when the last of twelve groups went live.

The implementation of ESR is one of the largest I.T. implementations in the world and replaced 29 payroll systems and approximately 38 human resources systems used throughout the NHS. The NHS is fifth largest employer in the world as of March 2012.

== Supported versions of software to access ESR ==
The ESR solution is based on Oracle's e-Business suite R12 which is certified to run with most Windows desktop operating systems currently supported by Microsoft. In general Oracle's certification of third party client operating systems and browser products are aligned to the respective vendor's lifetime support cycle.

Access to ESR is tested and supported on an ongoing basis against the following versions of software :-

- Windows 7 (32-bit)
- Internet Explorer version 8
- Microsoft Office 2010
- JRE version 1.6.0_39
- Flashplayer 10.3

Accepting that user organisations may wish to run more up to date versions of these software components, they are recommended to run at least one “Base” workstation on the supported levels above. The Base workstation should then be used to replicate any ESR access issues, before an access related support call is logged on the ESR Service Desk. The ESR Support Team will then work with the site to resolve the access issue on the Base workstation.
