= McKesson Europe =

International wholesale and retail company

McKesson Europe AG
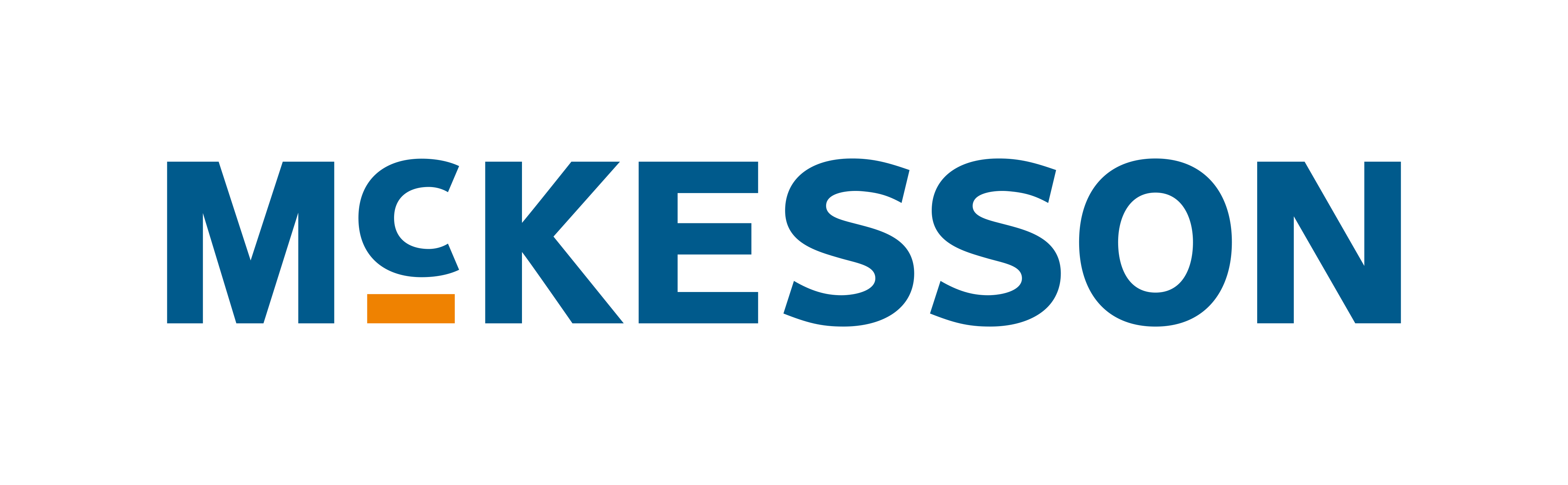
- Type: Subsidiary
- Industry: Pharmaceuticals
- Founded: 1835; 191 years ago
- Founder: Franz Ludwig Gehe
- Headquarters: Stuttgart, Germany
- Key people: Kevin Kettler (Chairman of the Management Board/ Chief Operating Officer/ Labour Relations Director), Brian S. Tyler (Chairman of the Supervisory Board)
- Services: pharmaceutical wholesale and retail
- Revenue: €21.18 billion (FY 2019)
- Number of employees: 36,917 (FY 2019)
- Parent: McKesson Corporation (76%)
- Website: www.mckesson.eu

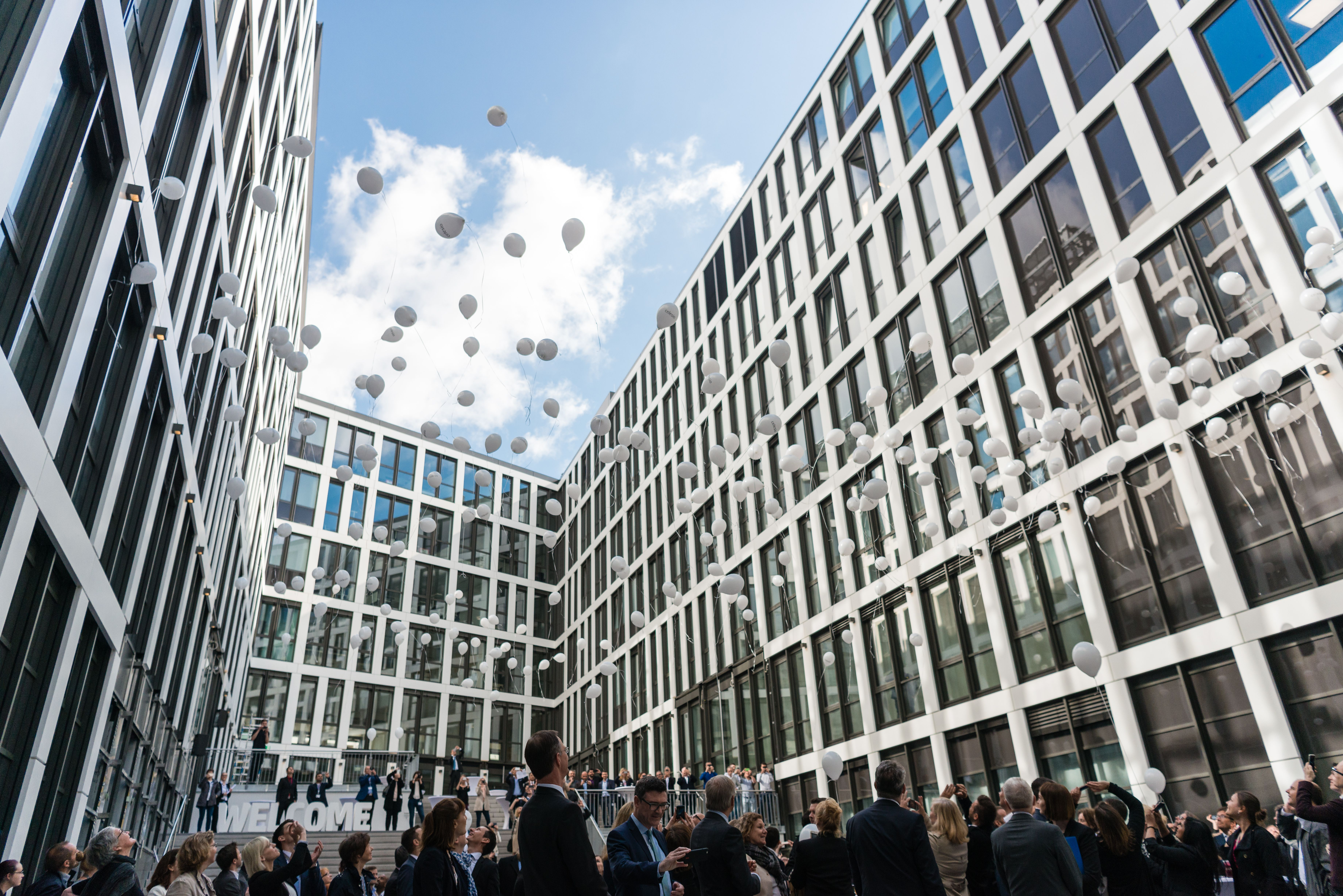
McKesson Europe Head Office Stuttgart

McKesson Europe AG (formerly Celesio AG, previously Gehe AG), with its headquarters in Stuttgart, Germany, is a leading international wholesale and retail company and provider of logistics and services in the pharmaceutical and healthcare sectors. The company had around 37,000 employees at the end of the 2019 financial year (31 March 2019) and is represented in 13 countries in Europe. In the 2019 financial year the company achieved a turnover of EUR 21.18 billion. The majority shareholder of the company is the US-based McKesson Corporation, which holds a share of 77.01%. The remaining 22.99% of shares are available on the open market. Kevin Kettler, a US citizen, has been Chairman of McKesson Europe since 1 November 2018.

== Overview ==
The head office is situated at Stockholmer Platz in the new Europaviertel of Stuttgart, next to Stadtbibliothek and Milaneo shopping centre. The company's core business consists of pharmaceutical wholesale and pharmacies. In the pharmaceutical wholesaling sector, McKesson Europe has a market presence in 14 countries. It has a range of services for pharmacists on matters of health, medicines and wellness. An extensive distribution network of more than 134 branches provides deliveries to some 65,000 pharmacies and hospitals.

== Company structure ==
The business is divided into two business areas:

- In the Pharmacy Solutions division, McKesson Europe combines its wholesale activities with pharmaceutical products in nine European countries. More than 50,000 pharmacies and hospitals are supplied from 116 wholesale branches every day. Additional services for pharmacists are also provided, such as pharmacy cooperations and the provision of IT platforms. McKesson Europe also offers various services for suppliers, manufacturers and other companies in the pharmaceutical and healthcare sectors.
- The Consumer Solutions division is aimed at patients and consumers and also includes activities in the areas of retail and mail-order pharmacies and home care. At the end of the 2019 financial year, McKesson Europe had approximately 1,900 retail pharmacies in five countries (Great Britain, Ireland, Belgium, Sweden and Italy) and 6,900 partner and brand partner pharmacies.

== History ==
=== 1835–1948 ===
The chemist and paint business Gehe & Co. was founded on 1 May 1835 by Franz Ludwig Gehe in Dresden on Königstraße and opened to the capital market by converting it into a stock corporation on 1 January 1903. In January 1904, the shares were admitted to the official public listing in Dresden.

In 1909, the company moved to the new location on Leipziger Straße and the trading house in Königstraße was vacated. With capital increases in 1910 and 1912, the financial basis for the establishment and expansion of a German-wide distribution of "drugs and paints, pharmaceutical and chemical products" was created. In 1922, the company founded its first German branch in Stuttgart. After the Second World War, the parent company in Dresden and most of the branches were expropriated. Gehe & Co. AG made a fresh start in West Germany with branches in Stuttgart, Kassel and Sulzbach-Rosenberg.

=== 1948–1981 ===
The Gehe parent company continued to operate in 1947 in Dresden under the name Heilchemie as a publicly owned enterprise and on 1 April 1951 with the nationalised parent company of the pharmaceutical company Dr. Madaus & Co from Radebeul merged to form VEB Arzneimittelwerk Dresden. Haniel took over the majority of the Gehe & Co. AG shares with effect from 1 January 1973. The condition of Haniel was that the GEHE’s management remained in the company, in order to further expand the solid foundation that was established after the war. The name Gehe, known in the pre-war period, was brought to the attention of pharmacists with the revitalised or newly created branches. These branches were formed during the transition to Haniel: Bremen, Hamburg, Kassel, Kelkheim, Landshut, Mühldorf, Munich, Nuremberg, Regensburg and Stuttgart. In 1973, the company achieved a turnover of DM 285 million. Other pharmaceutical wholesalers (Friedrich Schäfer GmbH, Weiterstadt and Kaiserslautern, Wilmaco GmbH, Hamm and Lieser Pharma-GmbH, Duisburg) were brought in to Gehe & Co. AG via the majority shareholder Franz Haniel & Cie.

=== 1981–2008 ===
In 1982, the Haniel Group acquired RUWA Rudloff & Watermann GmbH & Co. KG in Minden, a pharmaceutical wholesale company with a branch in Delmenhorst and integrated it into Gehe. In 1985, the Kaiser + Kraft Group, Stuttgart, a mail-order business for transport, storage, operational facilities and office equipment, was acquired. Until 1992, customers in Germany were supplied from the branches based in Hamburg, Berlin, Haan, Dresden, Stuttgart and Munich. In the following years, the group's trading structure spread across 14 countries in Europe and the USA. With the public offering of TAKKT on 15 September 1999, the spin-off of the Mail Order Division was ended.

=== From 2003 ===
In April 2003, the company celebrated its 100th year. On the birthday of the conversion into a joint-stock company, the Annual General Meeting decided to change the name from Gehe AG to Celesio AG, with a majority of 99.98%. Today, the German subsidiary GEHE Pharma Handel still operates under its original name. In April 2007, Celesio announced the acquisition of 90% of the shares in the mail-order pharmacy DocMorris, in order to build up a pharmacy chain across Germany. The acquisition took place in hopes that the third-party ownership ban of the Pharmacies Act would fail, but it was legitimised in May 2009 by the EuGH. For the pharmaceutical wholesaler Gehe, which was also part of the Celesio Group, the acquisition resulted in a loss of customers as pharmacists saw a threat in the chain. DocMorris was now operated as a franchise-like concept, in which pharmacists were allowed to use the DocMorris brand with the payment of a monthly licence fee. As a result, Celesio sold DocMorris in October 2012 to the company Zur Rose AG.

In June 2009, it became known that Celesio had acquired the majority of the largest Brazilian pharmaceutical wholesaler, Panpharma. In April 2012, Panpharma was fully taken over. In February 2016, Celesio agreed to sell its Brazilian business, consisting of Panpharma and Oncoprod, to the holding of the Brazilian pharmaceutical wholesaler, SantaCruz. In September 2013, Celesio sold its subsidiary, Rudolf Spiegel GmbH, to the company WEPA Apothekenbedarf.

On 24 October 2013, the US-based McKesson Corporation announced an agreement to acquire Celesio for EUR 6.1 billion (approx. EUR 23 per share). However, on 13 January 2014, the company reported that McKesson's acquisition of Celesio was unsuccessful, due to the 75% threshold not being reached. At the start of November 2013, the Elliot hedge fund acquired 12.68% of Celesio from Paul Singer, a well-known course of action by him to benefit from takeovers. Following McKesson's failed takeover, Singer increased his direct and indirect stake to around 32%. On 23 January 2014, Haniel took over the share from the Elliott hedge fund and served the 75.99% one day later to McKesson, which meant that the takeover was still a success. Sainsbury’s and Celesio announced the formation of a strategic pharmacy partnership in July 2013, in the course of which McKesson Europe's subsidiary LloydsPharmacy would acquire Sainsbury’s pharmacy business for GBP 125 million. Until 21 September 2015, the company's shares were listed in MDAX. The quotation in the index was removed, due to the change in the stock exchange segment from Prime Standard to the Regulated Unofficial Market. On 12 September 2017, Celesio was renamed McKesson Europe.

On 12 December 2019, McKesson Corporation announced that it planned to bring its German wholesale business (GEHE Pharma Handel GmbH, a subsidiary of McKesson Europe) into a joint venture with Alliance Healthcare Deutschland AG (a subsidiary of Walgreens Boots Alliance). McKesson should hold 30% of the planned joint venture, Walgreens Boots Alliance 70%.

=== Management Board ===
- Kevin Kettler (chairman of the board, Labour Director, since 1 November 2018)
- Tilo Köster (Member of the Board, Law and Compliance, since 23 September 2014)
- Alain Vachon (Member of the Board, Finance, since 16 July 2014).

=== Supervisory Board ===
- Brian S. Tyler (chairman)
- Ihno Goldenstein (deputy chairman)
- W. M. Henning Rehder (deputy chairman)
- Detlef Bernhardt
- Dennis Both
- Jörg Lauenroth-Mago
- Pauline Lindwall
- Susan Naumann
- Ulrich Neumeister
- Lori A. Schechter
- Jack Stephens
- Britt Vitalone

== See also ==
- Lloyds Pharmacy, owned by McKesson Europe AG
