= List of Canadian clothing store chains =

This list of Canadian clothing store chains encompasses some, but not all, of the retailers located in Canada.

== List ==
- Ardene
- Aritzia
- Beyond the Rack
- Bluenotes
- Boutiques Jonathan
- Boutique La Vie en Rose
- Boutique Lingerie Underworld Montreal
- Boutiques Ernest
- Browns
- Designer Depot
- Dynamite Clothing
- Giant Tiger
- Garage
- Gotstyle
- Grafton-Fraser
- Groupe Dynamite
- Harry Rosen Inc.
- Hatley
- Holt Renfrew
- Indochino
- J B Lefebvre
- Jacob
- Joe Fresh
- Kamik
- Kotn
- Laura
- Le Château - Now only a part of some Suzy Shier stores.
- LIJA Style
- Lolë
- Lululemon Athletica
- Mackage
- La Maison Simons
- Mark's
- Moores Clothing For Men
- Morsam Fashions
- Nygård International
- October's Very Own
- Pajar
- Penningtons
- Priape
- Reitmans
- River Island
- Roots Canada
- ShirtPunch (online)
- The Shoe Company
- Silvert's
- SSENSE
- Stitches
- Thyme Maternity
- Tip Top Tailors
- Urban Behavior
- Weaver & Devore Trading
- West 49

== Defunct ==
- Hudson's Bay (Hudson's Bay Company)
- Les Ailes de la Mode
- Wholesale Sports
- Addition Elle
- Dylex
- Off the Wall

== See also ==
- List of Canadian stores
