= Hatley =

Hatley may refer to:

== Places ==
- Hatley, Georgia, USA
- Hatley, Wisconsin, USA
- Hatley, Mississippi, USA
- Hatley, Cambridgeshire, England, UK
- Hatley Park, a neighbourhood in Colwood, British Columbia, Canada
- Hatley Park National Historic Site, a castle and park in Colwood, British Columbia, Canada
- Hatley, Quebec (municipality), Canada
- Hatley, Quebec (township), Canada

== Other uses ==
- Hatley (surname)
- Hatley (brand)
