= The Shops at Pickering City Centre =

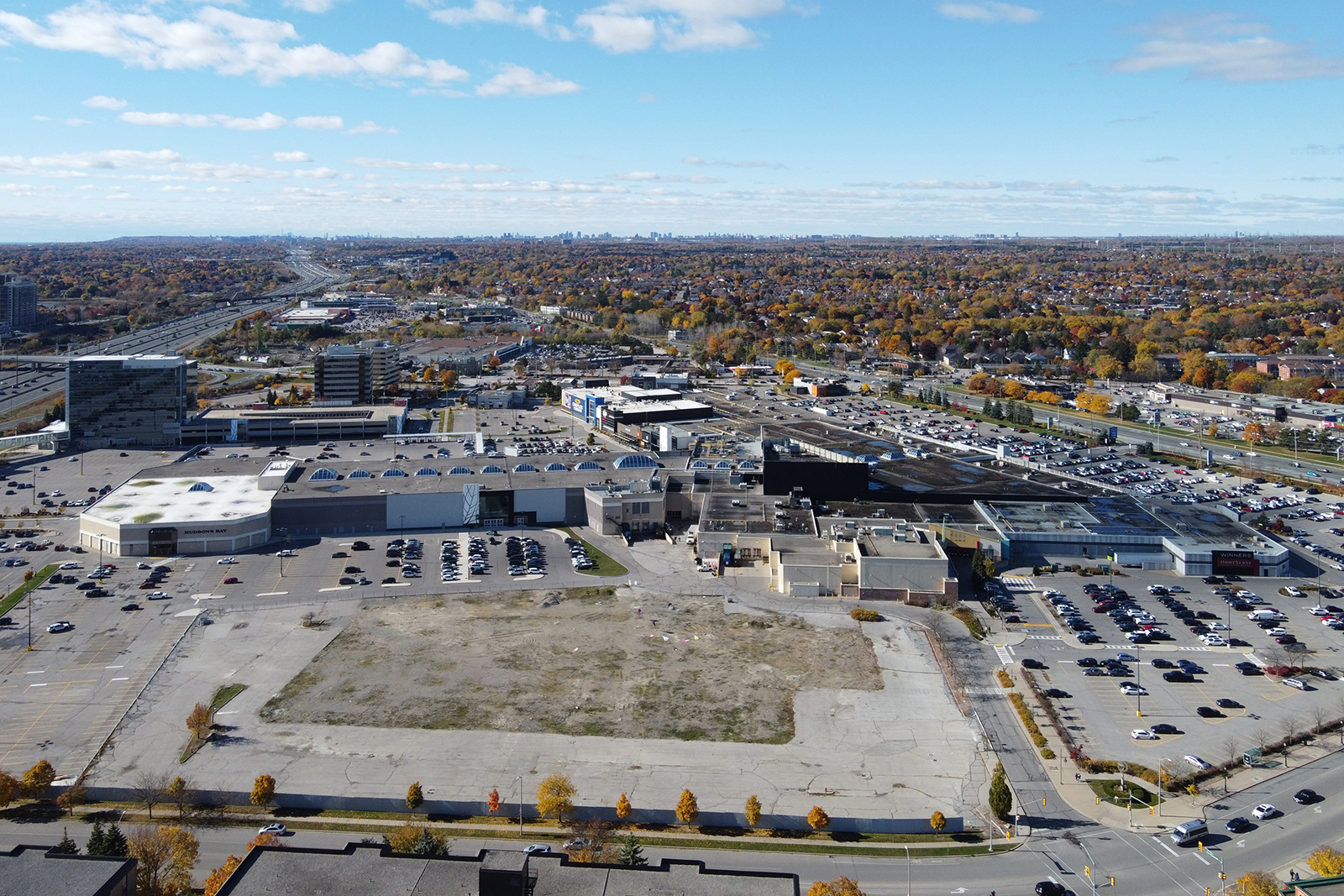
- Aerial view of Pickering Town Centre (2023)
- Location: Pickering, Ontario, Canada
- Coordinates: 43.83552°N 79.08620°W
- Address: 1355 Kingston Road
- Opened: 1972
- Manager: Salthill Property Management Inc.
- Num. of stores: 167
- Num. of anchor tenants: 6 (5 open, 1 in the process of redevelopment)
- Floor area: 904,049 sq ft (83,988.9 m^{2})
- Floors: 2
- Website: www.theshopsatpcc.com

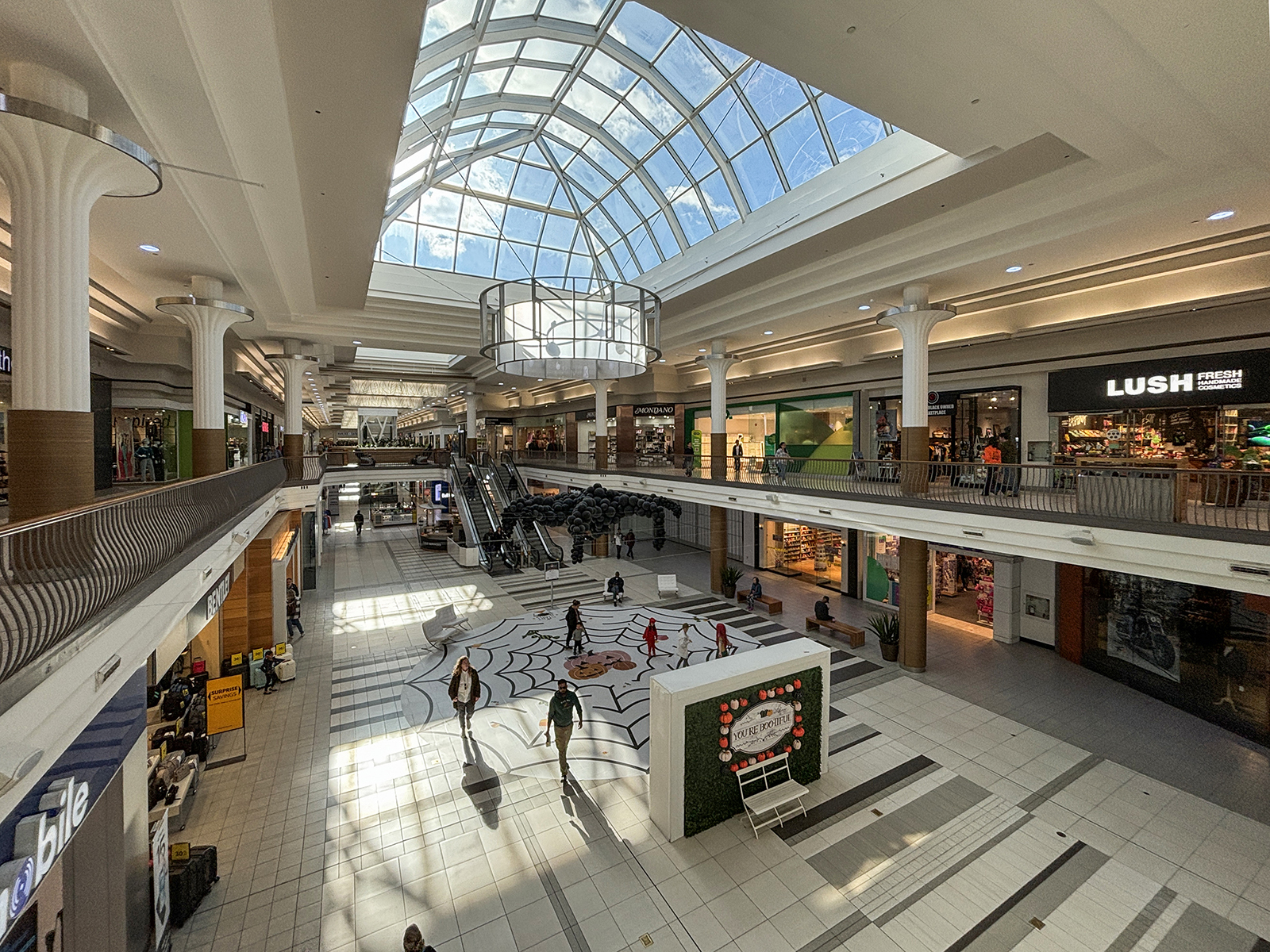
Mall Atrium

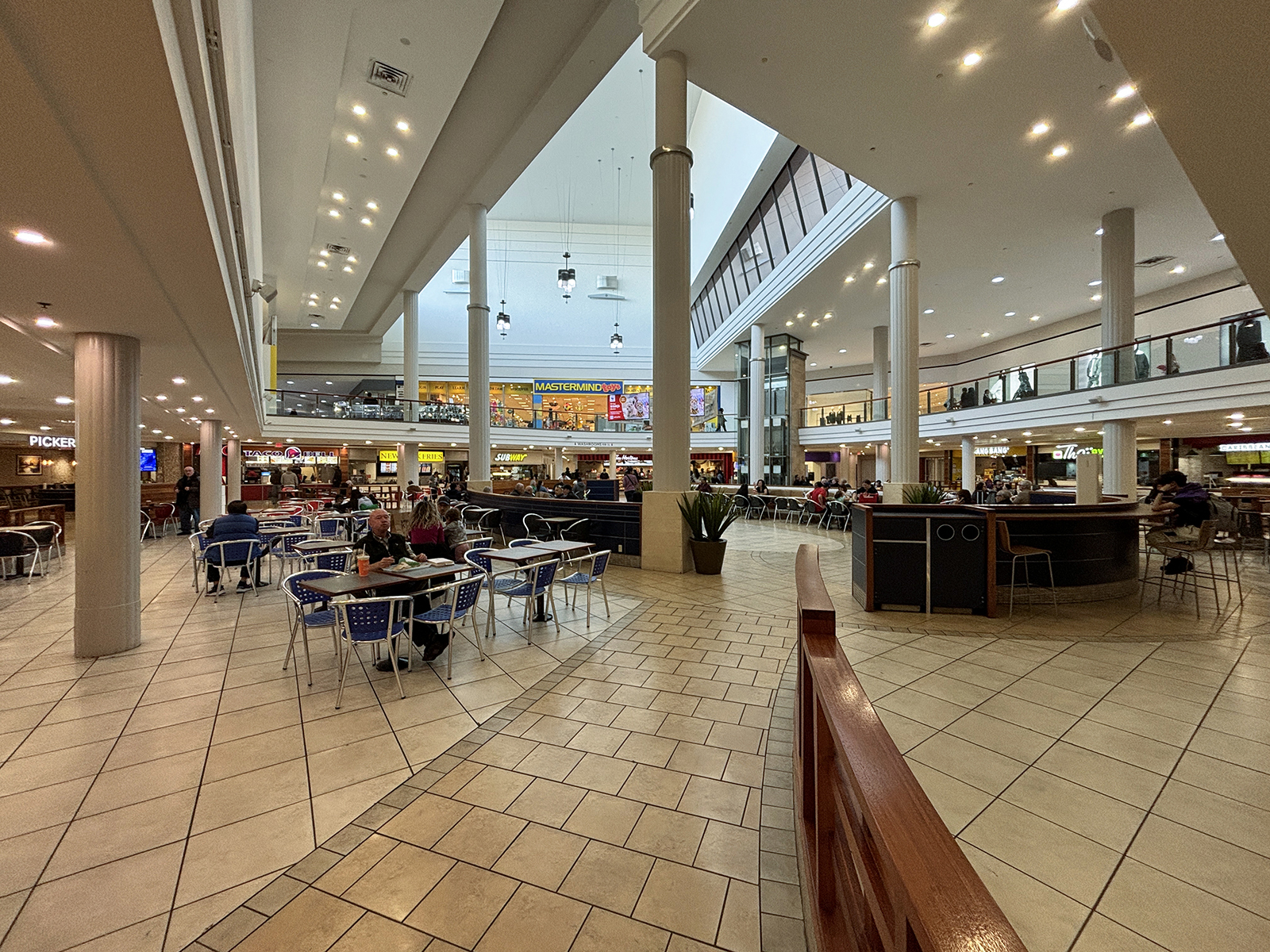
Food Court

The Shops at Pickering City Centre (formerly known as Pickering Town Centre (PTC)) is a large regional shopping mall located in Pickering, Ontario, Canada. Opened in 1972 as Pickering Sheridan Mall, the mall has over 150 stores.

== History ==
The mall opened in 1972 as the Sheridan Mall with 80 stores. Its first significant renovations were in 1998.

The PTC underwent a $17 million renovation through 2008 and 2009. This included new floors, ceilings, lighting and seating areas. It has a modern look and features an additional elevator.

On the morning of November 28, 2016, the Pickering Town Centre was flooded with water, causing the closure of the majority of the lower-level stores and Santa's Castle. The cause of the flooding was due to a broken water main. Most stores had reopened by December 1, 2016.

Following the closure of Target Canada in 2015, in 2017, the former Target store at the mall was replaced by three new stores, a Saks Off 5th outlet store, Cineplex Cinemas 11 and VIP movie theatre and a Farm Boy food market. In 2018 new stores were added, such as Winners/HomeSense and an Hakim Optical store. There are also redevelopment plans for the former Famous Players movie theatre and a Sears department store (under demolition to be replaced by condos) at the mall.

In May 2024, the mall was renamed "The Shops at Pickering City Centre".

A major redevelopment of the Shops at Pickering City Centre is underway as part of the Pickering City Centre master plan. Tower 1 is planned at 40 storeys and Tower 2 at 45 storeys, and both buildings are now under construction on the west side of the property. The towers include mixed use podiums and residential units and form the first phase of the new high density community planned around the mall and civic precinct.

The project also includes the plans to remove the Hudson’s Bay wing. This change will require several retailers in that corridor to relocate within the mall or close. Stores expected to be displaced include Bluenotes, Laura, Tip Top Tailors and SoftMoc.

Several new tenants have opened during the redevelopment period. Sephora and Chipotle Mexican Grill began operating in 2026, and the Lululemon pop up shop is now closed. The arrival of Splitsville is scheduled to open in fall 2026 in the former Saks Fifth Avenue unit near Entrance 3.

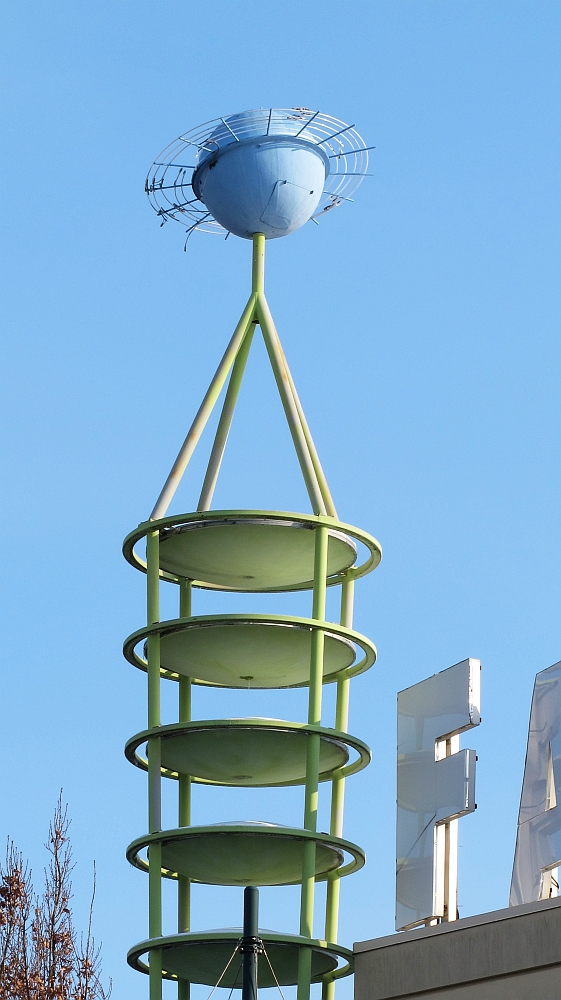
Googie-style space needle at Pickering Town Centre, which was part of the former Famous Players theatre. This has since been removed.

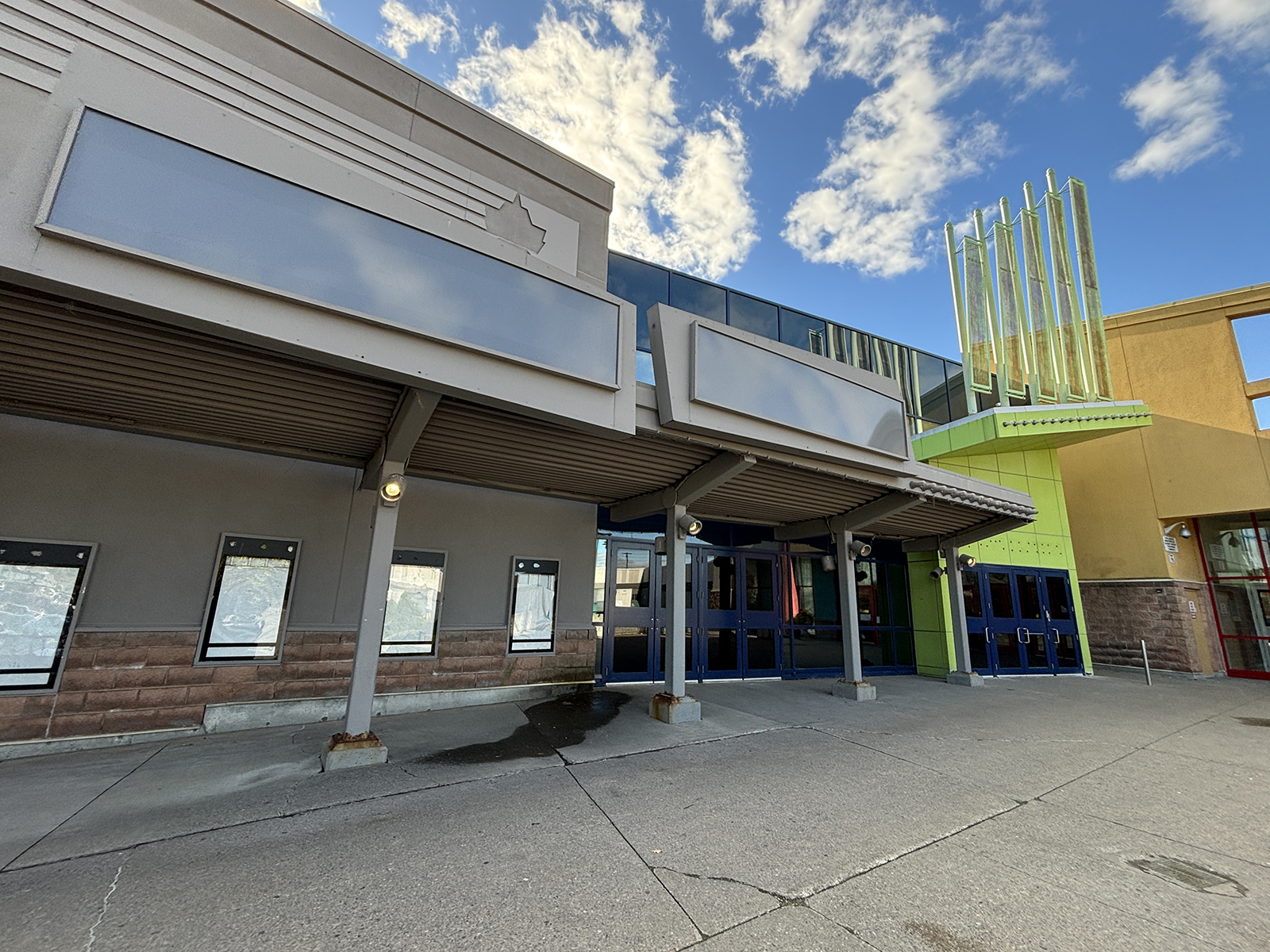
Former Famous Players

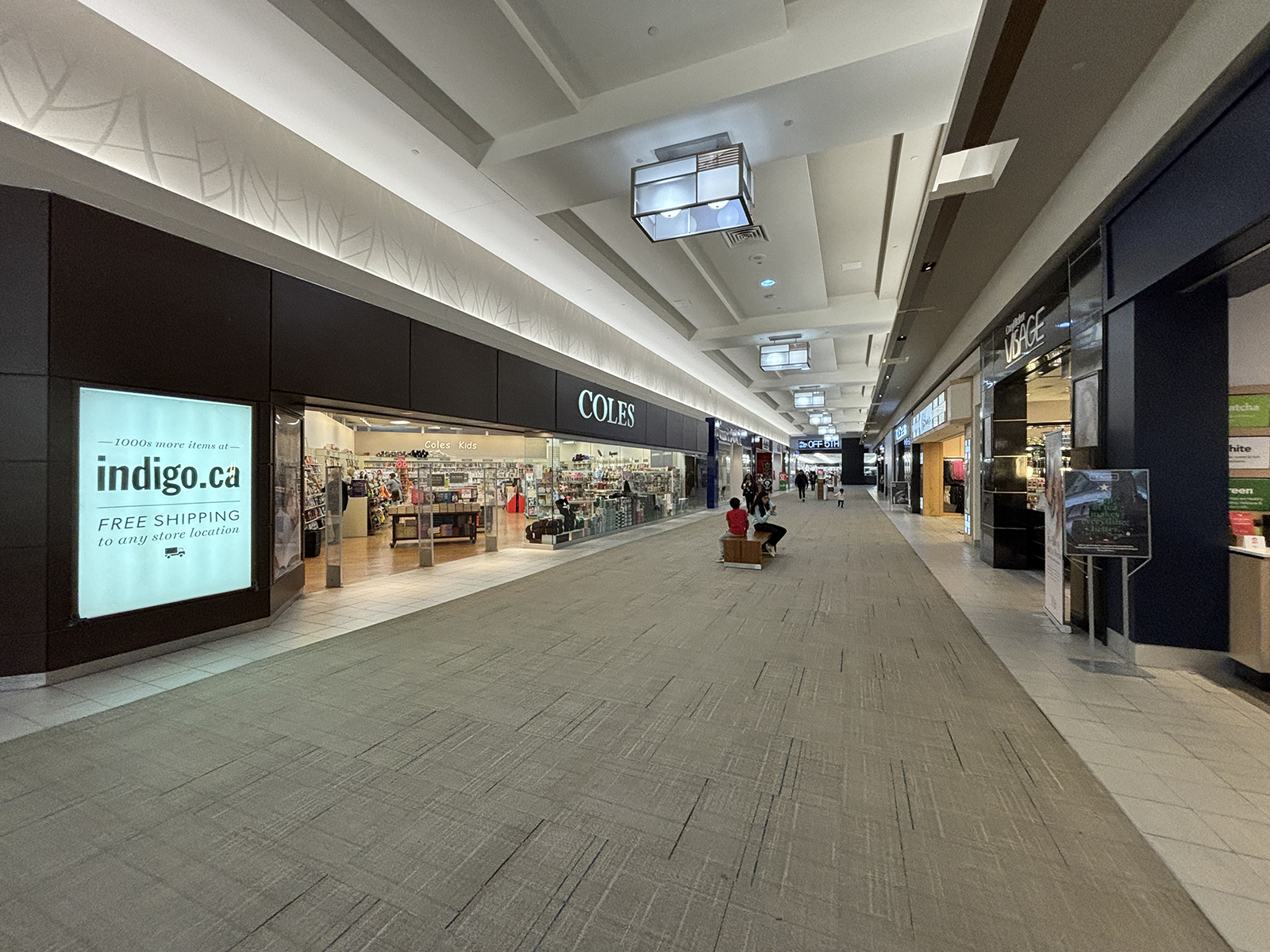
Mall Access

== Anchors ==
- Winners/HomeSense (opened 2018, formerly Sport Chek)
- H&M
- Shoppers Drug Mart
- Splitsvile Bowl (opening on Fall of 2026, formerly Target and Saks)
- Farm Boy (opened 2017, formerly Target)
- Cineplex Cinemas (opened 2018, formerly Target)
- Designer Depot (now in Hudson's Bay space on the lower level, used to be on Sears space)

=== Former anchors ===
- Hudson's Bay (closed 2025, Now Designer Depot on lower level)
- Kmart (closed 1998, now Splitsvile Bowl/Farm Boy/Cineplex)
- Eaton's (closed 1999, contained Hudson's Bay until 2025, now vacant)
- Zellers (closed 2012, now Splitsvile Bowl/Farm Boy/Cineplex)
- Target (closed 2015, now Splitsvile Bowl/Farm Boy/Cineplex)
- Famous Players (closed 2018, replaced by Cineplex Cinemas as the main theatre, former location now vacant)
- Sport Chek (closed 2018, now Winners/HomeSense)
- Dominion (supermarket) (Closed in mid-1990s, formerly Sport Chek, now Winners/HomeSense)
- Sears (closed 2018, became Designer Depot for a short time, now demolished)
- Designer Depot (was in Sears' former location for a short time, closed in 2020 and demolished)
- Saks Off 5th (Closed in Summer of 2025, now becoming Splitsvile bowl soon)

== New stores in 2025 ==
- Dave's Hot Chicken
- Pickleplex
- Lululemon (Permanently Closed)
- Sephora

== Stores that shutdown in 2025/2026 ==
- Hudson's Bay
- Saks Off 5th
- Starbucks
- Garage (clothing retailer)
- Best Buy
- Claire's
- The Beer Store
- Bootlegger
- Lululemon
- West 49
- Sirens (Closing)
- Rocky Mountain Chocolate
- Lids

== New stores in 2026 ==
- Chipotle (Recently Opened)
- Splitsvile Bowl (Coming soon)
- Designer Depot (Opened on lower level of Hudson's Bay)
- MINISO (Replacing Sirens Unit)
- Sephora (Replaced Mastermind Unit)
