= Blaming the Victims =

1988 book edited by Edward Said and Christopher Hitchens

- Editor: Edward Said and Christopher Hitchens
- Subject: Israeli–Palestinian conflict
- Genre: Essays
- Publisher: Verso Books
- Publication date: 1988
- Pages: 304
- ISBN: 0860918874

Blaming the Victims: Spurious Scholarship and the Palestinian Question is a collection of essays, co-edited by Palestinian scholar and advocate Edward Said and journalist and author Christopher Hitchens, published by Verso Books in 1988. It contains essays by Said and Hitchens as well as other prominent advocates and activists including Ibrahim Abu-Lughod, Janet L. Abu-Lughod, Noam Chomsky, Norman G. Finkelstein, Rashid Khalidi.

== Introduction ==
In his introduction, Said says he believes that the establishment of Israel occurred partly because the Israelis "acquired control" of the land, and partly because they had won the "political battle for Palestine in the international world in which ideas, representations, rhetoric, and images were at issue." He returns again to this theme, remarking on the "dominance of the Zionist viewpoint in Western cultural discourse ... " In describing this viewpoint he notes what he calls Zionism's "spurious, often flagrantly preposterous arguments." Said says there is an "official Zionist discourse", and "unofficial Zionist work", citing for some praise the "revisionist historians" such as Tom Segev and Benny Morris. Said criticizes American Zionists whose "shameless adulation of Israel is almost limitless."

Said remarks on a pattern in Israel supporters. They "reproduce the official party line on Israel or they go after delinquents who threaten to disturb the idyll." Critics and opponents of the Zionists "take it as their tasks first to decode the myths, then to present the record of facts in as neutral a way as possible." The Zionist viewpoint has "its peculiar blindnesses, its ideological weaknesses to say the least, its outrageous falsifications ... " (p. 13) Said notes that Western scholarly writing about the Middle East "is adversely affected by the Zionist-Palestinian conflict." Much work has been done by talented Arab scholars and writers, and non- or anti-Zionist Jews, but still needs to be done to expose and uncover the myths.

Concluding his introduction, Said says (p. 19),

The Palestinians have since 1974 premised their political work and organization on the notion of joint community for Arabs and Jews in Palestine. ... This collection of essays is presented in advancement of that goal.

Blaming the Victims is divided into four parts, with a number of essays comprising each part. The parts are entitled: "The Peters Affair", "Myths Old and New", '"The Liberal Alternative", and "Scholarship Ancient and Modern".

== Said and Finkelstein section ==
In this section of the book, "The Peters Affair" are contained two essays, one by Edward Said and one by Norman Finkelstein concerning Joan Peters and her book, From Time Immemorial , criticized by authors for what's considered an employing of propaganda techniques, and engaging in Pseudohistory. Peters alleged that the Arabic-Speaking population of Mandatory Palestine on the eve of the 1948 Arab-Israeli War was predominantly not of an indigenous origin, but rather recent arrivals from neighboring lands coming mostly after the First Aliyah, and that Palestinian refugee problem is in reality a population exchange with the Mizrahi and Sephardi Jews of the Islamic world, both claims decried as Nakba Denial.

== "Myths Old and New" ==
=== "Broadcasts" ===
In this essay, Christopher Hitchens discusses the "broadcast" issue. This relates to whether or not the Palestinian Arab population who were dispossessed were induced or incited to run away by their own leadership during the 1948 Palestinian expulsion and flight. Hitchens refers to Benny Morris´s then newly published article "The Causes and Character of the Arab Exodus from Palestine: The Israel Defense Forces Intelligence Service Analysis of June 1948", which was first published in January 1986 in the Middle Eastern Studies in which Hitchens quotes Morris as saying that the IDF intelligence report 'thoroughly undermines the traditional official Israeli "explanation" of a mass flight ordered or "incited" by the Arab leadership for political-strategic purposes.' (p. 75)

According to Hitchens this confirmation "by an Israeli historian using the most scrupulous and authentic Zionist sources, at last allows us to write finis to a debate which has been going on for a quarter of a century ... between Erskine B. Childers and Jon Kimche."

Hitchens then goes on to describe the exchange of letters between Erskine Childers and Jon Kimche in The Spectator following the publication of Childers' article of 12 May 1961.

Childers wrote of what Hitchens calls "the best-known Israeli propaganda claim" (p. 75) that the Palestinians had been urged to flee by their own leadership:

Examining every official Israeli statement about the Arab exodus, I was struck by the fact that no primary evidence of evacuation orders was ever produced. The charge, Israel claimed, was "documented"; but where were the documents? There had allegedly been Arab radio broadcasts ordering the evacuation; but no dates, names of stations, or texts of messages were ever cited. In Israel in 1958, as a guest of the Foreign Office and therefore doubly hopeful of serious assistance, I asked to be shown the proofs, I was assured they existed, and was promised them. None had been offered when I left, but I was again assured. I asked to have the material sent on to me. I am still waiting.

... I met Dr. Leo Kohn, professor of political science at Hebrew University and ... adviser to the Israeli Foreign Office. He had written one of the first official pamphlets on the Arab refugees. I asked him for concrete evidence of the Arab evacuation orders. ... he took up his own pamphlet. "Look at this Economist report," and he pointed to a quotation. "You will surely not suggest that the Economist is a Zionist journal?"

The quotation is one of about five that appear in every Israeli speech and pamphlet, and are in turn used by every sympathetic analysis. It seemed very impressive: it referred to the exodus from Haifa, and to an Arab broadcast order as one major reason for that exodus.

— Erskine Childers (1961). "The Other Exodus", The Spectator

Hitchens notes that Childers was "intrigued enough" to go on and examine the original (October 2) 1948 issue of the Economist, which had been cited as a source for the claim that Arab evacuation orders had in fact taken place. It turned out that the report, "which made vague reference to announcements made over the air" by the Arab Higher Committee, had been written from Cyprus by a correspondent who had used an uncorroborated Israeli source. Hitchens remarks: "It hardly counted as evidence, let alone first-hand testimony." (p. 76) The essay goes on to examine the rest of Childers' argument, and to agree that Childers had made his case that no such radio announcements were ever made.

Hitchens concludes the essay with the observation that even as he was writing the article, he noticed a full-page advertisement from Committee for Accuracy in Middle East Reporting in America (CAMERA), which said:

In 1948, on the day of the proclamation of the State of Israel, five Arab armies invaded the new country from all sides. In frightful radio broadcasts, they urged the Arabs living there to leave, so that the invading armies could operate without interference.

Hitchens says he wrote to CAMERA on 20 February 1987, asking for an authenticated case of such a broadcast. He did not receive any reply. And he concludes with a prediction:

Even though nobody has ever testified to having heard them, and even though no record of their transmission has ever been found, we shall hear of these orders and broadcasts again and again.

=== Essay from Peretz Kidron ===
In his essay "Truth Whereby Nations Live", Israeli journalist and translator Peretz Kidron tells of his collaboration with the Canadian Ben Dunkelman in 1974 ghostwriting the latter's autobiography Dual Allegiance. Dunkelman had fought for Israel in the 1948 Arab-Israeli War as a commander of the 7th Brigade, the country's best-known armored brigade. He had participated in Operation Dekel, leading the 7th Brigade and its supporting units as it moved to capture the town of Nazareth between July 8 and 18, 1948. Nazareth capitulated July 16, after little more than token resistance. The surrender was formalized in a written document that agreed that the inhabitants would cease hostilities in return for promises that no harm would come to the civilian population. A few hours later Dunkelman was given an oral order to evacuate the civilian population of Nazareth which he refused to obey. Dunkelman had told Kidron that he believed the Palestinian inhabitants in Nazareth were not forced to evacuate because of his refusal to follow that order. In the end, Dunkelman decided not to use this episode in his autobiography, but Kidron felt that this was important evidence that Israel had forcibly expelled the Palestinians, and he made a copy of it.

Kidron goes on to relate how in 1978–79 he translated Yitzhak Rabin´s memoir, Soldier of Peace, into English. While doing so he had access to the part of Rabin's memoirs which related to the expulsion of Palestinians from Lydda and Ramle in the middle of July 1948 ("Operation Larlar"). While the Israeli military censor passed the manuscript, a special ministerial commission struck out several portions of the translation, including this section where Rabin had written:

What would they do with the 50,000 civilians in the two cities ... Not even Ben-Gurion could offer a solution, and during the discussion at operation headquarters, he remained silent, as was his habit in such situations. Clearly, we could not leave [Lydda's] hostile and armed populace in our rear, where it could endanger the supply route [to the troops who were] advancing eastward. ... Allon repeated the question: What is to be done with the population? Ben-Gurion waved his hand in a gesture that said: Drive them out! ... 'Driving out' is a term with a harsh ring ... Psychologically, this was one of the most difficult actions we undertook. The population of Lod did not leave willingly. There was no way of avoiding the use of force and warning shots in order to make the inhabitants march the 10 to 15 miles to the point where they met up with the legion. The inhabitants of Ramleh watched and learned the lesson. Their leaders agreed to be evacuated voluntarily ...

After some soul searching, Kidron passed both the Dunkelman story and the Rabin story to The New York Times. They published the story as "Israel bars Rabin from Relating ´48 Eviction of Arabs", on 23 October 1979, which included the above quotation.

Kidron's conclusion:

In brief, the two descriptions, particularly when taken together, proved beyond any shadow of doubt that there were high-level directives for mass expulsions of the Arab population, and that the decision-makers, evidently aware of the discreditable and unlawful nature of such a policy, were careful to leave no incriminating evidence about their personal and political responsibility.

— Kidron (1979). "Israel bars Rabin from Relating ´48 Eviction of Arabs", The New York Times

=== Noam Chomsky essay ===
Chomsky's essay, "Middle East Terrorism and the American Ideological System", is an indictment of Israeli and American military operations during the 1980s in the Middle East and Central America, respectively. It is a critique of the role of the Western media in covering these operations up and in painting a picture of the Arabs as inveterate terrorists. He describes Shimon Peres and Ronald Reagan as "two of the world's leading terrorist commanders," noting that Peres had just "sent his bombers to attack Tunis, where they killed twenty Tunisians and fifty-five Palestinians", with the civilian victims "crushed ... to dust" (quoting a Ha'aretz report) in alleged retaliation for the killing of Israeli civilians, noting further that "There can be no serious doubt of [Reagan administration] complicity in the Tunis attack". He proceeds to describe their "shared conception of 'peace' furthermore, [as excluding] entirely one of the two groups that claim the right of national self-determination." (Palestinians).

He refers to "American discourse" on the subject as being framed in "racist terms". He bemoans that Israel denies the Palestinians the right to elect their own representatives to peace negotiations. He presents documentation of what he calls "atrocities" committed by Israelis (for example Peres' "Iron Fist" operations in Southern Lebanon, which he quotes a Western diplomat as characterizing as reaching new depths of "calculated brutality and arbitrary murder", taken from a The Guardian report. He refers to the Israeli-run prison camp at Ansar, Lebanon as a "concentration camp". He supports the thesis that the Israelis created and manipulated the conflict between Lebanese Christians and Muslims and other ethnic conflict in Lebanon, citing the New York Times, the Christian Science Monitor and other sources. Chomsky holds that, as a U.S. "client state", Israel "inherits from its master [the United States] the 'right' of terrorism, torture and aggression." Chomsky is particularly contemptuous of claims that criticism of Israeli tactics is a manifestation of anti-Semitism, saying such charges are false, and that the media "bends over backwards" to see things from the Israeli perspective.

The essay was described as "breathlessly deranged" by Glenn Frankel in a review in The Washington Post.

== See also ==
- Edward Said bibliography
