= Grafton-Fraser =

Canadian men's clothing retailer

Grafton Apparel Ltd.
- Trade name: Grafton Apparel
- Type: Private
- Industry: Retail
- Founded: 1853; 173 years ago
- Founder: James Beatty Grafton
- Headquarters: North York, Toronto, Ontario
- Number of locations: 143 (2021)
- Area served: Canada
- Key people: Lance Itkoff (CEO)
- Subsidiaries: Tip Top Tailors; George Richards Big and Tall; Mr. Big & Tall; Kingsport Clothiers
- Website: graftonfraser.com

Grafton Apparel Ltd. is a Canadian seller of men's apparel. Grafton Apparel Ltd. operates through its retail chains, Tip Top Tailors, George Richards Big and Tall, Mr. Big & Tall, and Kingsport Clothiers, which are located coast to coast in Canada. The company's leading competitor is Men's Wearhouse's Moores.

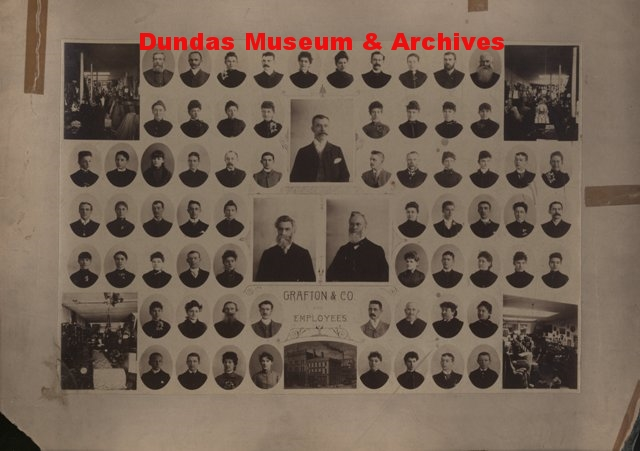
Grafton & Co. and Employees

== History ==
=== History of Grafton Apparel ===
In 1853, James Beatty Grafton, son of Irish immigrants, left school at the age of 16 to become an apprentice in the dry goods industry. Moving later that year to Dundas, Ontario, he went into business with Anthony Gregson and opened a dry goods, millinery and clothing shop known as Gregson & Grafton. In 1858, Anthony Gregson retired and James Grafton was joined in business by his brother John to form the J.B. & J.S. Grafton Co. In 1859, James John Grafton, the son of James Beatty Grafton joined the company as a full partner and the company was once again renamed to Grafton & Co. In 1889 the store was ready to expand and opened its second branch in Owen Sound, Ontario. Within the next 16 years five more branches opened in southern Ontario in Peterborough, Hamilton, London, Brantford and Woodstock.

In 1900, Grafton & Co. opened a factory across the street from its original store in Dundas to ensure that all the products they offered were manufactured with their trademark "High Grade".

By the 1960s, Grafton & Co. was a known name in Ontario with eight stores around the province.

=== History of Jack Fraser ===
Jack Fraser had been founded in 1926 by Jack Fraser in Toronto's east-end. The store was quickly established for its superior value to the customer. By the 1950s, the chain had 17 stores across south-central Ontario. Jack Fraser offered its selection in the Boys and Menswear departments at Woolco stores, giving it coast to coast exposure, in addition to its own 23 Jack Fraser stores, located principally in shopping centres.

=== Acquisitions & Expansions ===
On July 19, 1967, Grafton & Co. purchased Jack Fraser Stores Limited and became Grafton-Fraser Limited.

After the merger, the decision was made to expand Jack Fraser from Ontario to across Canada, while continuing to expand with Woolco in their Menswear department. The expansion, started in 1969, was completed by 1976 with the establishment of their 80th store. At this time, Jack Fraser stores were found in every province.

1977 saw the next merger for Grafton-Fraser when they purchased George Richards Kingsize Clothes Limited, Canada's largest chain of specialty apparel for big and tall men.

In the early 1980s, Grafton-Fraser also operated the Dapper Dan chain of jeans and casual clothing stores, competing head on with Dylex's Thrifty's chain. Dapper Dan operated stores with a colour scheme and signage font very close to today's The Gap stores. In 1984, Grafton-Fraser launched its Grafton & Co. Store which was an upscale menswear specialty retailer featuring high fashion sportswear and casual clothing.

Faced with the recession of the early 1990s, Grafton-Fraser was forced to re-evaluate its operational strategy, reinventing itself centered on its key strength in the men's apparel market. The company divested itself of all footwear operations as well as home furnishings, business, women's departments, children departments and leased department activities (such as Woolco), as well as all non-Canadian enterprises launched during the late '70s and early '80s.

Emerging from reorganization in 1992, Grafton-Fraser was composed of three complementary chains of retail stores: Grafton & Co., Jack Fraser Menswear and George Richards Big & Tall Menswear. The company underwent major changes with 75% of shares being sold to the Cadillac Fairview Corporation and Stonehouse controlling 25%. Glenn Stonehouse became the President & CEO. In 1994, Stonehouse bought all of the shares from the Cadillac Fairview Corporation.

=== Recent History ===
In 1999, Stonehouse continued to expand the company, buying the Canadian operations of Repp Ltd. Big and Tall stores from the bankrupt Edison Brothers Stores of St. Louis, Missouri. The chain was repositioned and re-merchandise the merchandise mix to its original origins and customer base. It was re-branded Mr. Big & Tall in a large media campaign in the fall of 1999, returning to its original name.

Later that same year, Grafton-Fraser struck an agreement with Timberland retail stores. This partnership led to Grafton-Fraser being the franchise operator of Timberland-branded retail stores. The company was quick to open two new flagship Timberland stores which are recognized for both their footwear and clothing selection. The division peaked at nine stores in very short order.

The year 2000 saw the largest acquisition of all. Grafton-Fraser bought the Tip Top Tailors chain along with Weston Apparel and Montreal based San Remo Knitting and importing business from Dylex Ltd. in July of that year. Stonehouse quickly divested Weston Apparel and San Remo. The size of the Company doubled to over 200 stores and approximately $200 million in revenue.

The Company also acquired the Kingsport Clothiers store.

In 2005, the Company made the decision to retire the Jack Fraser name and rename all Jack Fraser stores Tip Top Tailors, finding that the Tip Top Tailors name was more recognizable. In cities where both a Jack Fraser and a Tip Top Tailors were present, the more profitable of the two stores stayed open and, where necessary, changed its name to Tip Top Tailors. Today, there are over 100 Tip Top Tailors across Canada in all provinces except Quebec and Prince Edward Island.

In May 2007, Stonehouse sold majority ownership of the company to Gordon Brothers Group, an investment banking company from Boston, USA.

The Timberland division was closed during 2007 and 2008. The Grafton & Co. chain was merged with the Stonehouse Menswear, and all those stores were rebranded under the Stonehouse Menswear brand. This retail chain was closed in 2010, with all Stonehouse stores closed in that year. The merchandise brand Stonehouse was continued in Tip Top Tailors.

In January of 2017, Grafton-Fraser Inc. filed for temporary protection under the Companies' Creditors Arrangement Act. In June, GSO Capital Partners purchased the business, continuing the operation of 140 Tip Top Tailors, Mr. Big and Tall and George Richards stores across several provinces. Following this, the company was renamed to Grafton Apparel Ltd.

In 2023, Stern Partners Inc. announced their purchase of Grafton Apparel Ltd.
