= Microplay =

Microplay may refer to:

- Microplay Software, a defunct video game label by MicroProse
- Microplay (retailer), a Canadian video store chain, subsidiary of Le SuperClub Vidéotron
