= Edward Said bibliography =

Edward Said (1 November 1935 – 25 September 2003) was an American literary theorist, cultural critic, and political activist of Palestinian descent. He was University Professor of English and Comparative Literature at Columbia University, and edited several academic books. A founding figure in postcolonialism, he wrote dozens of books, lectures, and essays. Anthologies of his essays have been published, and several of his interviews and conversations have also been edited into book form.

== Books by Said ==
Publications
Year	Book	Notes	Publisher
1966	Joseph Conrad and the Fiction of Autobiography		Harvard University Press. Republished by Columbia University Press in 2007, ISBN 0-231-14004-5
1975	Beginnings: Intention and Method		Basic Books, ISBN 0-465-00580-2. Reprinted by Johns Hopkins University Press in 1978, ISBN 0-8018-2085-5. New edition published by Columbia University Press in 1985, ISBN 0-231-05937-X
1978	Orientalism		Pantheon Books, ISBN 0-394-42814-5. Republished by Vintage Books in 1979, ISBN 0-394-74067-X. 25th Anniversary Edition published by Penguin Classics in 2003, with 1995 afterword, ISBN 0-14-118742-5
1979	The Question of Palestine		Times Books, ISBN 0-8129-0832-5. Republished by Vintage Books in 1980, ISBN 0-394-74527-2. Republished, with a new introduction and epilogue, by Vintage Books in 1992, ISBN 0-679-73988-2
1981	Covering Islam: How the Media and the Experts Determine How We See the Rest of the World		Pantheon Books, ISBN 0-394-50923-4, ISBN 0-394-74808-5 (paperback). Revised edition published by Vintage Books in 1997, ISBN 0-679-75890-9
1983	The World, the Text, and the Critic		Harvard University Press, ISBN 0-674-96186-2
1986	After the Last Sky: Palestinian Lives	With photographs by Jean Mohr.	Pantheon Books, ISBN 0-394-54413-7, ISBN 0-394-74469-1 (paperback). Faber and Faber, ISBN 0-571-13683-4. Republished by Columbia University Press in 1999, ISBN 0-231-11449-4 (paperback)
1988	Nationalism, Colonialism, and Literature: Yeats and Decolonization		Field Day (Derry, Northern Ireland), ISBN 0-946755-16-7
1990	Nationalism, Colonialism, and Literature	Reprint of Said's "Yeats and decolonization" with essays by Terry Eagleton, Fredric Jameson, and an introduction by Seamus Deane	University of Minnesota Press, ISBN 0-8166-1862-3, ISBN 0-8166-1863-1 (paperback)
1991	Musical Elaborations		Columbia University Press, ISBN 0-231-07318-6
1993	Culture and Imperialism		Knopf, distributed by Random House, ISBN 0-394-58738-3. Republished by Vintage Books in 1994, ISBN 0-679-75054-1
1993	Edward Said: A Critical Reader	Edited by Michael Sprinker	Wiley-Blackwell, ISBN 1-55786-229-X
1994	The Politics of Dispossession: The Struggle for Palestinian Self-Determination, 1969-1994		Pantheon Books, ISBN 0-679-43057-1
1994	Representations of the Intellectual: The 1993 Reith lectures		Pantheon Books, ISBN 0-679-43586-7
1995	Peace and Its Discontents: Essays on Palestine in the Middle East Peace Process	Preface by Christopher Hitchens	Vintage Books, ISBN 0-679-76725-8
1999	Out of Place: A Memoir	Winner of the 1999 New Yorker Prize for non-fiction. Presentation by Said on Out of Place, October 8, 1999, C-SPAN	Knopf, ISBN 0-394-58739-1
2000	The Edward Said Reader	Edited by Moustafa Bayoumi and Andrew Rubin	Vintage Books, ISBN 0-375-70936-3
2000	The End of the Peace Process: Oslo and After		Pantheon Books, ISBN 0-375-40930-0. Republished by Vintage Books in 2001, ISBN 0-375-72574-1
2000	Reflections on Exile and Other Essays	Booknotes interview with Said on Reflections on Exile and Other Essays, June 17, 2001, C-SPAN	Harvard University Press, ISBN 0-674-00302-0
2002	Parallels and Paradoxes: Explorations in Music and Society	By Daniel Barenboim and Said. Edited, with a preface, by Ara Guzelimian.	Pantheon Books, ISBN 0-375-42106-8. Republished by Vintage Books in 2004, ISBN 1-4000-7515-7
2003	Freud and the Non-European	With an introduction by Christopher Bollas and a response by Jacqueline Rose.	Verso Books, ISBN 1-85984-500-2
2004	From Oslo to Iraq and the Road Map	Foreword by Tony Judt, afterword by Wadie E. Said.	Pantheon Books, ISBN 0-375-42287-0
2004	Humanism and Democratic Criticism		Columbia University Press, ISBN 0-231-12264-0
2006	Paradoxical Citizenship: Edward Said	Edited by Silvia Nagy-Zekmi	Lexington Books, ISBN 0-7391-0988-X
2006	On Late Style: Music and Literature Against the Grain	Foreword by Mariam C. Said, introduction by Michael Wood	Pantheon Books, ISBN 0-375-42105-X
2007	Music at the Limits	Foreword by Daniel Barenboim, preface by Mariam C. Said	Columbia University Press, ISBN 0-231-13936-5

== Interviews and essays ==
Publications
Year	Title	Notes	Publisher
1980	The Middle East: What Chances For Peace?	Edited by François Sauzey. Contributions by Joseph J. Sisco, Shlomo Avineri, Said, Saburo Okita, Udo Steinbach, William Scranton, Abdel Hamid Abdel-Ghani and H.R.H. Prince Saud al-Faisal	Issue number 24 of the Trialogue series. Published by the Trilateral Commission OCLC 271040449
1987	Criticism in Society	Interviews with Jacques Derrida, Northrop Frye, Harold Bloom, Geoffrey Hartman, Frank Kermode, Said, Barbara Johnson, Frank Lentricchia, and J. Hillis Miller. Compiled by Imre Salusinszky.	Taylor & Francis, ISBN 0-416-92270-8
1989	Representing the Colonized: Anthropology's Interlocutors	Critical Inquiry, 15(2):205-225	University of Chicago Press, doi:10.1086/448481
1993	Napoleon in Egypt: Al-Jabartî's Chronicle of the First Seven Months of the French Occupation, 1798 translated by Smuel Moreh	Includes "The scope of orientalism" by Said	M. Wiener Publishers (Princeton, New Jersey), ISBN 1-55876-069-5, ISBN 1-55876-070-9 (paperback)
1994	The Pen and the Sword: Conversations with David Barsamian		Common Courage Press (Monroe, Maine), ISBN 1-56751-031-0, ISBN 1-56751-030-2 (paperback)
2000	Mona Hatoum: The Entire World as a Foreign Land	Essays by Said and Sheena Wagstaff	Tate Gallery Publishing (London, England), ISBN 1-85437-326-9
2001	Power, Politics, and Culture: Interviews with Edward W. Said	Edited and with an introduction by Gauri Viswanathan	Pantheon Books, ISBN 0-375-42107-6
2003	Culture and Resistance: Conversations With Edward W. Said	Interviews with Said by David Barsamian	South End Press, ISBN 0-89608-671-2, ISBN 0-89608-670-4 (paperback)
2004	Thoughts on Late Style		London Review of Books, Vol. 26, No. 15, August 5, 2004: 3-7.
2004	Interviews With Edward W. Said	Edited by Amritjit Singh and Bruce G. Johnson.	University Press of Mississippi, ISBN 1-57806-365-5, ISBN 1-57806-366-3 (paperback)
2005	Edward Said: Continuing the Conversation	Edited by Homi Bhabha and W.J.T. Mitchell	University of Chicago Press, ISBN 0-226-53201-1, ISBN 0-226-53203-8 (paperback)

== Prefaces and editing work ==
Publications
Year	Book	Notes	Publisher
1973	The Arabs Today: Alternatives for Tomorrow	Essays presented at the fourth annual convention of the Association of Arab-American University Graduates, Boston, 1971. Edited by Said and Fuad Suleiman.	Forum Associates (Columbus, Ohio)
1980	Literature and Society	Edited, with preface, by Said	Johns Hopkins University Press, ISBN 0-8018-2294-7
1988	Blaming the Victims: Spurious Scholarship and the Palestinian Question	Edited by Said and Christopher Hitchens	Verso Books, ISBN 0-86091-175-6, ISBN 0-86091-887-4 (paperback)
1989	Kim by Rudyard Kipling	Edited with an introduction and notes by Said	Penguin Books, ISBN 0-14-018352-3
1999	Acts of Aggression: Policing Rogue States	Collection by Noam Chomsky, Said and Ramsey Clark	Seven Stories Press and Turnaround Publisher Services (London), ISBN 1-58322-005-4
1999	Complete Stories, 1884-1891 by Henry James	Edited by Said	Library of America, ISBN 1-883011-64-7
2002	Jewish History, Jewish Religion: The Weight of Three Thousand Years by Israël Shahak	Foreword to the second printing by Said	Pluto Press, ISBN 0-7453-0818-X
2002	CIA et Jihad, 1950-2001: contre l'URSS, une désastreuse alliance by John K. Cooley	Preface by Said	Autrement (Paris), ISBN 2-7467-0188-X

== Radio ==
- 1993 BBC Reith Lectures: Representation of the Intellectual

Audio: The Reith Lectures Archive 1976 - 2010 podcast
Transcript: The Reith Lectures transcripts 1990 - 1999

== Films ==
1980s

- "In the Shadow of the West", The Arabs: A Living History, The 10-Part Series (1985). Minutes:50, The main focus is on the plight of the Palestinians which can be seen as the most enduring residue of the modern encounter between the Arabs and the West. Edward Said traces the course of European involvement with the Near East via the Crusades to Napoleon's campaign in Egypt and the French and English entrepreneurs, adventurers and empire builders who came in his wake.
- "Exiles: Edward Said" (TV Movie 1988) With Edward Said. Directed by Christopher Sykes. Production by 'BBC Two'. Edward Said, tells his story and the story of Palestine.
- “The Palestinians” (1988) television documentary prepared and presented by Edward Said and Ibrahim Abu Lughod. The Palestinians was a two-part historical documentary commissioned by Channel 4, produced by Taylor Downing, and directed by David Edgar.

1990s

- Pontecorvo: The Dictatorship of Truth (1992) (TV)
- "Edward Said: A Very Personal View of Palestine". BBC documentary. May 1998. Broadcast in the United States by the Public Broadcasting System as "In Search of Palestine".
- "IN SEARCH OF PALESTINE", a documentary film about Palestine for BBC. that BBC was unsuccessful to in getting it on U.S. television.
- "The 20th Century: A Moving Visual History" (1999) TV mini-series - Columbia University
- L'autre (1999) / "The Other" - Europe (English title)

2000s

- Tragedy in the Holy Land: The Second Uprising. Orland Park, Ill.: MPI Home Video, 2002. Mueler, Dennis.
- Multiple Identities: Encounters with Daniel Barenboim (2002) (TV)
- Edward Said: The Last Interview (2004)
