= Peretz Kidron =

Israeli writer, journalist and translator (1933–2011)

Peretz Kidron (Hebrew: פרץ קדרון; 29 July 1933 – 6 November 2011) was an Israeli writer, journalist and translator.

== Biography ==
Kidron was born in Vienna, the son of Sara and Herman Kirchenbaum [Kay] who were devoted Zionists and supporters of the Jewish state. His family escaped to Great Britain in 1938 following the annexation of Austria into Nazi Germany. After completing his secondary education in Britain, he emigrated to Israel, where he lived on and off in Zikim, a kibbutz in southern Israel, for about 15 years. Both of his children were born on the kibbutz. During this period, Kidron was sent by the kibbutz to the UK as a youth leader for the Zionist leftist youth movement Hashomer Hatzair, to prepare and bring Jewish youth to immigrate to Israel. In the early 1970s, he graduated from Tel-Aviv University with a degree in English and translation.

Starting in the late 1960s, Kidron became active in the Israeli peace movement. In 1975, he was a founding member of the Israeli Council for Israeli-Palestinian Peace and served on the steering committee of the human rights group B'Tselem. Kidron was a long-time Israel correspondent for the British magazine Middle East International.

From the 1980s, Kidron handled international contacts for the peace group Yesh Gvul. He later compiled and edited a collection of writings by Israeli conscientious objectors titled Refusenik! Israel's Soldiers of Conscience (2004), which was prefaced by American writer Susan Sontag.

In 1976, Kidron co-authored the memoirs of the Palestinian activist Raymonda Tawil, My Home, My Prison. His translations from Hebrew to English include the memoirs of Yitzak Rabin and Ezer Weizman, and a biography of David Ben-Gurion. His translation of Rabin's autobiography was censored by Israel's military censor. The passages removed were Rabin's account of the 1948 departure of 50,000 civilians from Ramla and Lydda, particularly Ben-Gurion's gesture, which Rabin understood to mean "Drive them out!" The missing passages were printed in The New York Times on 23 October 1979.

In 1984, he ghostwrote Dual Allegiance, the autobiography of Ben Dunkelman, a Canadian Jewish military officer who refused to carry out an expulsion of civilians from Nazareth during the 1948 Arab–Israeli War.

In 1988, his essay "Truth Whereby Nations Live", which discusses his work on Rabin and Dunkelman's autobiographies, was included in the essay collection Blaming the Victims, edited by Edward Said and Christopher Hitchens.

== Death ==
Kidron died in Jerusalem on 6 November 2011, and was buried in Kiryat Anavim, a kibbutz in central Israel.
