= Jumbo Video =

Canadian brand of franchised video stores

- Industry: Video rental Video Games Movies Popcorn Coffee Board Games Hobby Store Coffee
- Founded: 1987; 39 years ago
- Defunct: 2018 (corporate-owned stores)
- Fate: Merged with Le SuperClub Vidéotron, 1 Jumbo Video franchised store remains in operation in London
- Headquarters: London, Canada
- Area served: Ontario, Atlantic Canada
- Owner: Philip Davidson (2021–present); Quebecor Media (2004–2018); Jumbo Entertainment (1987–2004)
- Parent: Le SuperClub Vidéotron
- Website: jumbovideomicroplay.com

Jumbo Video is a Canadian brand of franchised video stores. The brand was previously owned by Le SuperClub Vidéotron, a division of Quebecor Media, which maintained corporate-owned stores until 2018. As of 2019, Jumbo Video is now owned by Jumbo Video Microplay located in London, Ontario Canada.

== History ==
Jumbo Video was founded in May 1987 and quickly grew into one of Canada’s largest video rental chains, at one point claiming to be the third-largest player in the Canadian market.

Its video game subsidiary, Microplay, was established in 1986 and later acquired by Jumbo Video in the late 1990s to strengthen the company’s presence in the booming video game rental market.

By the early 2000s, however, Jumbo Video faced ongoing financial struggles. In 2004, the company’s assets were purchased by Quebecor Media, leading to a rebranding of the chain. From that point, Jumbo Video became the English Canadian counterpart of Quebec’s Le SuperClub, with both brands sharing similar marketing strategies. After the closures of Blockbuster Canada and Rogers Video between 2011 and 2012, Le SuperClub and Jumbo Video together represented the largest remaining video rental network in Canada.

As of early 2015, the official Jumbo Video website listed 11 stores — five in Ontario and six across Atlantic Canada. However, closures continued, with the St. John’s, NL location shutting down in 2015.

In 2019, in London, Ontario franchise became the official last remaining Jumbo Video. This family-owned store has been operating for over 35 years, making it a nostalgic landmark in the city. Beyond movie rentals and sales, it has expanded its offerings to include a wide variety of flavored popcorn, single-serve coffee, collectibles, trading cards, figurines, and plush toys. The store also served as a hub for video game enthusiasts, offering buying, selling, and trade services for both new and retro video games, consoles, and accessories.

== Slogans ==
- "Let Us Entertain You" (1987–1992)
- "Home of Free Popcorn!" (1990–1998)
- "Home of the guarantee." (1998–2005)
- "Tons of copies!" (2006–2018)
