= Dynamite Clothing =

Clothing company (f. 1984)

Dynamite
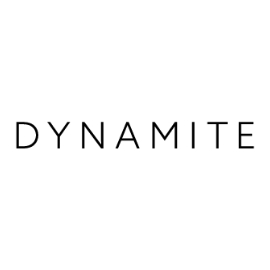
- Dynamite Clothing logo
- Industry: Retail, Fashion
- Founded: 1984
- Headquarters: Montreal, Quebec, Canada
- Number of locations: 86
- Area served: North America
- Key people: Andrew Lutfy (CEO)
- Products: Apparel; footwear; accessories
- Parent: Groupe Dynamite
- Website: www.dynamiteclothing.com

Dynamite Clothing (stylized as DYNAMITE) is a clothing store catering to the needs of Millennials. Founded in 1984 as a subsidiary of Groupe Dynamite, Dynamite currently has locations in Canada and the United States. Alongside its sister brand, Garage, Groupe Dynamite has been recognized as one of Canada's Top Employers for young people in 2019. The current CEO, Andrew Lutfy, started working at Groupe Dynamite at the age of 18 and was one of the creators of the Dynamite clothing brand. Dynamite contributes to the CURE Foundation, a Canadian foundation that provides funding for basic and clinical research for breast cancer.

== History ==
The first Dynamite store opened in Carrefour Laval in 1984. As of July 2019, the company had 86 stores in 2 countries (81 in Canada, 5 in the United States).
