= Andrew Lutfy =

Canadian billionaire businessman

- Born: August 1964 (age 61–62); Montreal, Canada
- Children: 2

Andrew Lutfy (born August 1964) is a Canadian billionaire businessman. He is president and owner of Groupe Dynamite and CEO of Carbonleo.

== Career ==
Lutfy began his career in 1982, at the age of 18, as a clerk in the first Garage store, located in the east end of Montreal.

In 2002, Lutfy became president and sole owner of Groupe Dynamite, a women's clothing retailer with a presence in Canada and the United States, operating the Dynamite and Garage brands.

In 2024, Groupe Dynamite announced its intention to list on the Toronto Stock Exchange, a move that could value the company at approximately $2.3 billion and allow Andrew Lutfy to retain control of the group despite the sale of a minority stake. As of May 2026, the company had a market capitalization of C$10.53 billion.

In 2025, Lutfy criticized François Legault and the Quebec government's immigration policies, stating that they were hindering the growth of Groupe Dynamite by complicating the recruitment of foreign senior executives and specialists.

Lutfy also runs Carbonleo, a real estate developer behind several major projects in Montreal, including Quartier DIX30, Royalmount and the Four Seasons Montreal, which includes a luxury hotel and private residences.

== Philanthropy ==
In 2023, the oncology unit at the McGill University Health Centre (MUHC) was named the Andrew J. Lutfy and Family Cedars Oncology Unit, in recognition of a $C 3.6 million donation to the Cedars Cancer Foundation. His maternal grandfather, Joseph “Joe” Chamandy, was one of the founders of the Cedars Cancer Foundation in 1966.

== Personal life ==
Lutfy grew up in a family of entrepreneurs in Montreal. He is married to Melanie Cosgrove and is the father of two children and a grandfather. Although his mother tongue is English, Lutfy is fully bilingual and speaks fluent French. He chose to send his children to French school to help them integrate better into Montreal life.

In 2026, his shares in Dynamite are worth 6.7 billion Canadian dollars.

His maternal grandfather, Joseph "Joe" Chamandy, was the founder of Gildan, one of the world's leading manufacturers of clothing, socks, and hosiery.
