= Ben Dunkelman =

Canadian Jewish officer

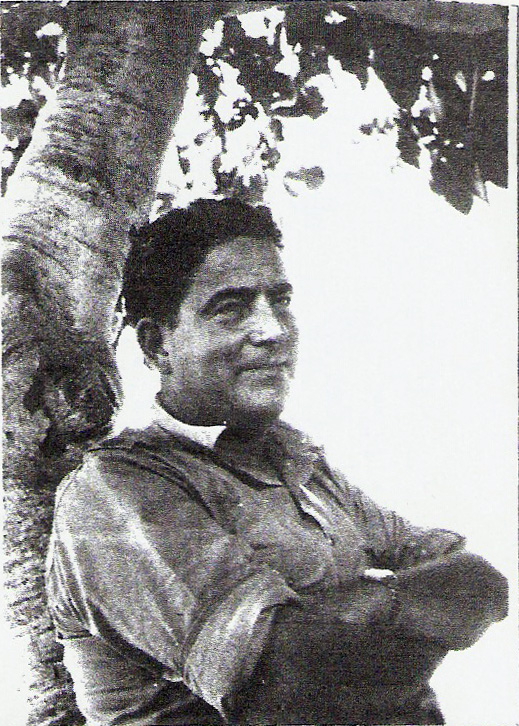
- Ben Dunkelman in October 1948, during Operation Hiram
- Born: June 26, 1913; Toronto, Ontario, Canada
- Died: June 11, 1997 (aged 83); Toronto, Ontario, Canada
- Occupations: Soldier; Businessman
- Spouse: Yael Lifshitz

Benjamin "Ben" Dunkelman DSO (June 26, 1913 – June 11, 1997) was a Canadian Jewish military officer and businessman. Dunkelman served in the Canadian Army in World War II and the Israel Defense Forces in the 1948 Arab–Israeli War. In Israel, he was called Benjamin Ben-David. He subsequently headed the retail chain Tip Top Tailors and was a real estate developer, art gallery owner, and restauranteur.

== Biography ==
=== Early life ===
Benjamin Dunkelman was born in Toronto to Ashkenazi Jewish immigrant parents. His father David Dunkelman was from Makov (modern Maków Mazowiecki, Poland) in the Russian Empire, and was the founder of the Canadian men's clothing retailer Tip Top Tailors. His mother Rose Dunkelman (née Miller) was originally from Philadelphia and rose to prominence in Toronto for her charity work during World War I. His parents were committed Zionists. Dunkelman and his siblings grew up on an estate, Sunnybrook Farm (now the site of Sunnybrook Health Sciences Centre), northeast of Toronto, built by his wealthy father, as well as the family's summer home at Lake Simcoe. Dunkelman later recalled about growing on Sunnybrook Farm that "it was a dreamland, a children’s paradise". As a child, he met prominent Zionists who stayed at Sunnybrook Farm, including future Israeli President Chaim Weizmann.

He attended Upper Canada College in Toronto, where he was noted for his active social life and for excelling at football. Besides his love of sports, Dunkelman enjoyed sailing Lake Ontario in his yacht. In 1931, financial losses caused by the Great Depression forced David Dunkelman to sell off Sunnybrook Farm.

On his 18th birthday in 1931, Dunkelman's parents presented him with a ticket and money for a trip to Mandatory Palestine, at that time a League of Nations Mandate administered by Great Britain. He initially took a tour of Europe, including a cruise on the Rhine River, before arriving in Palestine. Once there, he decided to stay for a while and used family connections to find work at a private farm near Kfar Saba, working as both a laborer and an armed watchman, or shomer, protecting the farm from raiders. Dunkelman recalled: "I went off a flabby, pampered boy; I returned as a tough young man who had seen the world." He loved the Holy Land, and only reluctantly returned to Toronto in 1932 to assist his father. He briefly went to Palestine again in 1935 before returning to Canada, where he worked in the family business and led a playboy lifestyle.

=== Military career ===
After World War II broke out in 1939, Dunkelman decided to enlist despite the opposition of his family. He refused an attempt by his father to arrange a position for him as a Lieutenant Colonel in the Ordnance Corps responsible for military supplies and attempted to join the Royal Canadian Navy (RCN), but antisemitism in the RCN at the time precluded a naval career. He had been judged as overqualified to be a seaman and put on a waiting list for officer training before learning that navy policy at the time was to not accept Jews as officers. Dunkelman enlisted in the Canadian Army as a private with The Queen's Own Rifles of Canada in 1940, joining the unit's Second Battalion. Dunkelman later gave his reason for enlisting as an "active" (willing to fight overseas) member as "I am a Canadian, proud of Canada’s heritage and proud -- if need be -- to fight for it." He was promoted to sergeant, completed an NCO course, and served as an acting company sergeant major before being accepted for officer training. After being commissioned as a Lieutenant, he trained new recruits before being shipped overseas with the First Battalion in 1943 and was put in command of a mortar platoon. His unit was stationed in England before being sent into action during the Normandy landings on D-Day, 6 June 1944.

Dunkelman was in the second wave to land on Juno Beach, the beach assigned to Canada on D-Day. He fought in the difficult campaigns in northern France, Belgium, the Netherlands and Germany, including actions such as the Battle for Caen, the Falaise pocket, and the Battle of the Scheldt to open up the critical port of Antwerp. During the Normandy campaign in June–August 1944 and then during the Battle of the Scheldt, the Canadian Army took heavy losses. At the same time, the policy of Prime Minister William Lyon Mackenzie King of only sending "active" members who had volunteered to fight overseas ensured there was a shortage of replacements. Under Mackenzie King's policy, men were conscripted for the military, but only for the defense of Canada, leading to a situation where two divisions stood waiting on the coast of British Columbia and another division on the coast of Nova Scotia. At the time of the Battle of the Scheldt, Dunkelman wrote in disgust: "We knew why leaves were so scarce. Thanks to Prime Minister Mackenzie King's handling of the Conscription issue at home". During his service, Dunkelman earned numerous commendations.

In 1945, he was awarded a Distinguished Service Order (DSO) for his service in the Hochwald campaign in northwest Germany during the drive to the river Rhine. In March 1945, Dunkelman played a key role in taking the steep Balberger Wald ridge in the dark forests of the Hochwald.

After the war, he was offered command of the First Battalion of the Queen's Own Rifles but declined and returned to Toronto to help run the family business. In January 1948, with the British withdrawing from Mandatory Palestine and the 1947–1948 civil war in Mandatory Palestine between Palestine's Jewish and Arab communities underway, Dunkelman began working to recruit volunteers and surplus military equipment for the Jewish war effort before being persuaded to fight in Palestine by Lorna Wingate, the widow of Orde Wingate, and Mickey Marcus. In March 1948 he left for Palestine, arriving in early April, and joined the main Jewish military force, the Haganah. He was assigned to the Harel Brigade commanded by Yitzhak Rabin, and joined a supply convoy that broke through the Arab siege of Jerusalem while under fire. He subsequently participated in a number of engagements in Jerusalem and commanded a mortar unit.

Following the establishment of the State of Israel in May 1948, the new nation was invaded by the surrounding Arab armies, sparking the 1948 Arab-Israeli War. Dunkelman continued fighting with the Haganah and then the newly-formed Israel Defense Forces. With Jordanian forces besieging Jerusalem, Dunkelman joined a four-man group commanded by Amos Horev that conducted a reconnaissance mission to find a potential supply route to the city in an armored car. They managed to successfully slip out of the city through Arab-controlled territory along a route that had already been known to the Israelis and used to bring in supplies on foot. The route was selected as a bypass road and was subsequently paved, becoming known as the Burma Road. As a result, supplies could be brought into the Jewish areas of Jerusalem.

After leaving Jerusalem, Dunkelman was asked by Prime Minister David Ben-Gurion to advise on the production of locally built mortars that had been declared unsafe by the IDF's Ordnance Corps. He judged them to be safe and subsequently trained soldiers in their use. In July 1948, he was given command of the 7th Armored Brigade, the country's best-known armored brigade. At the time, the brigade had been badly mauled in the Battles of Latrun, with morale low and most of the soldiers being hastily trained new immigrants. Under his command, the brigade was sent to the Galilee. He led the brigade in Operation Dekel, an offensive to capture the Lower Galilee. Dunkelman's troops enjoyed a number of successes which greatly improved morale. Under his command the brigade captured Nazareth.

In his autobiography, Dual Allegiance, Dunkelman tells the story of how, between July 8 and 18, 1948 during Operation Dekel, he led the 7th Brigade and its supporting units as it moved to capture Nazareth. The town surrendered after little more than token resistance.

Shortly after the capture of Nazareth, Dunkelman received orders from General Haim Laskov to expel the Palestinian civilian population from the town, which he refused to carry out. Israeli journalist and translator Peretz Kidron, with whom Dunkelman collaborated in writing Dual Allegiance, reproduced his record of Dunkelman's account of the capture of Nazareth in a book chapter entitled "Truth Whereby Nations Live":

"[less than a day later] Haim Laskov [came] to me with astounding orders: Nazareth's civilian population was to be evacuated! I was shocked and horrified. I told him I would do nothing of the sort—in view of our promises to safeguard the city's people, such a move would be both superfluous and harmful. I reminded him that scarcely a day earlier, he and I, as representatives of the Israeli army, had signed the surrender document in which we solemnly pledged to do nothing to harm the city or its population. When Haim saw that I refused to obey the order, he left."

Twelve hours after Dunkelman refused to expel the inhabitants of Nazareth, Laskov appointed another officer as military governor.

"Two days after the second truce came into effect, the Seventh Brigade was ordered to withdraw from Nazareth. Avraham Yaffe, who had commanded the 13th battalion in the assault on the city, now reported to me with orders from Moshe Carmel to take over from me as its military governor. I complied with the order, but only after Avraham had given me his word of honour that he would do nothing to harm or displace the Arab population. [....] I felt sure that [the order to withdraw from Nazareth] had been given because of my defiance of the evacuation order."

Dunkelman's defiance of the evacuation order forced Laskov to attempt to obtain sanction from a higher level. However, Ben-Gurion finally vetoed the order; the Arab inhabitants in Nazareth were never forced to evacuate. Dunkelman's argument that expelling the mostly Christian Palestinians of Nazareth would damage relations with the overwhelming Christian nations of the West seemed to have changed Ben-Gurion's mind.

After the second truce of the war went into effect on July 18, Dunkelman intensively trained the brigade. Following a return to combat operations, he led the brigade in Operation Hiram, which resulted in the capture of the Upper Galilee. Under his command, the 7th Armored Brigade achieved numerous victories while sustaining low casualties due to the fact that its attacks were executed via well-planned flanking maneuvers that passed through difficult terrain with minimal enemy forces.

In spite of his refusal to expel the population of Nazareth, the 7th Armored Brigade was otherwise known as one of the crueler combat forces of the period. Israeli historian Ilan Pappé writes: "In many of the Palestinian oral histories that have now come to the fore, few brigade names appear. However, Brigade Seven is mentioned again and again, together with such adjectives as 'terrorist' and 'barbarous.'" In his memoirs, Dunkelman later admitted to having allowed his troops to loot Palestinian property. His unit was also implicated in numerous massacres of Palestinian civilians during Operation Hiram, including the Safsaf massacre and the Sa'sa' massacre.

During the war, Dunkelman met and married Yael Lifshitz. Lifshitz was a corporal in the Israeli army who served under Dunkelman. They married in Haifa after the successful completion of Operation Hiram. The wedding took place in the Lifshitz family home on Mount Carmel and services were conducted by the Chief Rabbi of Haifa. By the time Dunkelman returned to duty the war was nearly over.

== Civilian career ==
After the war Dunkelman was offered a commission in the peacetime Israeli army but he decided to take a leave from the IDF instead. In February 1949, Dunkelman and his wife left for a visit to Canada and returned in April, when he decided to decline the offer. He then engaged in three business ventures but returned to Canada with his wife in October 1949 after learning that his mother was seriously ill. His mother subsequently died and was buried in Israel at her request, while the Dunkelmans' first child was born in Canada. Due to his father pressing him to return to the family business and receiving word that his business ventures were turned down by the Israeli government, Dunkelman and his wife decided to stay in Canada.

The family business subsequently expanded, with Dunkelman leading Tip Top Tailors after his father's retirement in 1950. In recognition of Dunkelman's World War II service, the Parliament of Canada voted to give Yael Dunkelman Canadian citizenship, instead of forcing her to apply for Canadian citizenship, which her husband called a "splendid gesture". The Dunkelmans had six children.

In 1967, he almost died of a heart attack, which led him to retire from the family's business of running the Tip Top Tailors company. He sold the company to Dylex Limited. After his heart attack, he decided to focus on his real passion, collecting art. He and his wife also ran the Dunkelman Gallery in Toronto, as well as a restaurant, Dunkelman's Fine Dining, in Midtown Toronto. The Dunkelman Gallery, which he founded in 1967, became "well-known as a showcase for Canadian and international artists". In September 1969, the Dunkelman Gallery hosted the personal archaeological collection of the Israeli Defense Minister, General Moshe Dayan, which mostly consisted of art from ancient Canaan and Phoenicia. At its closing in 1973, the gallery was acquired by Library and Archives Canada, and remains the only private art gallery held by the archives.

Dunkelman also became a real estate developer. Among his developments were the Cloverdale Mall and the Regal Constellation Hotel. Dunkelman was one of the founders of the Island Yacht Club, which he founded in 1951 after the Royal Canadian Yacht Club refused to accept him on account of his being Jewish. Dunkelman settled into retirement in Toronto in his seventies and continued to support artistic and political causes. He died in Toronto in 1997 at the age of 83.

There is a bridge on the Lebanese border called Gesher Ben in Dunkelman's honor. His story is told in the film Ben Dunkelman: The Reluctant Warrior.
