= Le SuperClub Vidéotron =

Canadian video store chain

Vidéotron Le superclub
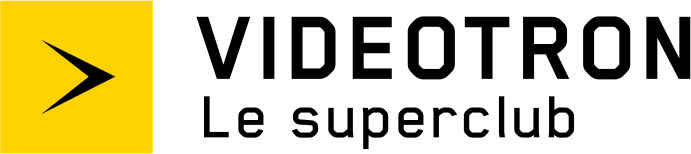
- Industry: Video rental
- Founded: 1989; 37 years ago
- Defunct: 2024
- Headquarters: St. Leonard, Quebec, Canada
- Area served: Quebec
- Parent: Vidéotron

Le SuperClub Vidéotron Ltée, which includes the Jumbo Video and Microplay chains, was a Canadian brand of franchised video stores. It was owned by Quebecor Media, with operations concentrated in Quebec. It was the largest video store chain operator in Canada, maintaining corporate-owned stores until 2018. As of 2023, the brand franchised a total of 14 stores: two SuperClub, two Jumbo Video and ten Microplay stores.

== History ==
In 2004, SuperClub took over the Jumbo Video and Microplay franchises. Jumbo Video operates 17 video rental locations nationwide, while Microplay focuses primarily on video games, but also rents and sells movies. The Microplay name has recently appeared on a number of in-store boutiques at SuperClub locations throughout Quebec. In 2006, most Rogers Video stores in Quebec were closed or converted to Le SuperClub Vidéotron. There are currently 69 Microplay locations and the vast majority of them are co-located with SuperClub locations in Quebec.

As of August 2005, the chain operated more than 185 locations through Quebec under the SuperClub brand. They also have locations in Edmundston, New Brunswick, and Rockland, Ontario. They had also opened locations in Moncton and Fredericton. Those stores were eventually bought out by Rogers and converted into Rogers Video stores.

Their location in Square One Shopping Centre was recently closed down along with many other stores, including Cavendish Mall in Côte Saint-Luc as well as Kirkland, Quebec, Dollard-des-Ormeaux, Beaconsfield, Quebec as well as in Montreal's Pierrefonds-Roxboro borough. They also closed their location in Hawkesbury, Ontario.

Their head office was located in the city of Montreal's Saint-Léonard borough.

== Subsidiaries ==
=== Microplay ===
Microplay is a video game retailer specializing in new and used video game software. Founder Bill Pearce originally established a shop on Bank Street, Ottawa named Gamer Video in 1981, which rented Atari and Intellivision games; it was one of the first Canadian businesses to rent video game cartridges. Gamer Video was destroyed in a fire in 1983. In 1986, Pearce and childhood friend Mason Copeland opened Microplay in Ottawa. By April 1989, the store had two locations in Ottawa and one in Toronto, and acted as a supplier to 25 Canadian video game stores. To avoid the high markups charged by Canadian video game distributors, Pearce and Copeland made weekly trips to New York City to buy cartridges for the wholesalers and distributors they supplied.

Microplay began franchising in June 1993, expanding to 28 stores, and became regarded as Canada's leading video game specialty chain. Microplay's first United States location opened in Bradenton, Florida in July 1994, and its first Great Britain location opened on Stratford Road in Shirley in November 1994; the Shirley location was highly successful, beating the four-month sales target of the American and Canadian locations in four weeks. By January 1995, Microplay was operating 119 franchisees, with 19 in the United States, predominantly in the East Coast.

Programs offered by Microplay include free rentals for students with A grades, computerized memos with parental limits on the type and number of children's rentals, free video game consoles for hospitals and in-patient medical centers, and monthly video game tournaments. Microplay attributed its success in the mid-90s to an apparent lack of competition, the popularity of video games, and the retailer's customer-friendly concept. New franchise owners invested an average of US$140,000 to outfit and stock their stores, along with a US$29,500 franchise fee; in Great Britain, each store cost between £40,000-60,000 to outfit and stock depending on the location.

In September 1995, Minneapolis-based Jumpin' Jax Corp., an operator of children's indoor entertainment centres, expressed interest in acquiring Microplay. On January 4, 1996, Thornhill, Ontario-based Tevana Traders Corp. signed a letter of intent to purchase Microplay for an undisclosed amount, planning to change its name to Microplay Capital Corp. following the acquisition. The retailer suffered poor management from a number of owners, and it was reduced to 85 locations by 2000. The company was acquired by Toronto-based game distributor Hip Interactive Corp. in December 1999 as part of a string of purchases in the gaming retail industry. On October 19, 2000, Microplay announced a relocation of its head office to the United States and an expansion of 22 stores, primarily in Quebec and North Carolina. By 2002, the retailer's ownership had shifted to Jumbo Entertainment, which in turn was sold to Québecor Média's Le SuperClub Vidéotron in 2004.

== Locations ==
As of December 2022, Le SuperClub Vidéotron listed the following locations as movie rental stores:

- Aylmer
- Boucherville
- Buckingham
- Cap-de-la-Madeleine
- Charlesbourg
- Fabreville
- Gréber ‡
- Greenfield Park
- Île-Perrot
- Jonquière
- L'Assomption
- Lachine
- Lafontaine
- La Plaine
- Lavaltrie
- Mascouche
- Mont-Laurier †
- Pointe-aux-Trembles
- Roland-Therrien
- Saint-Antoine
- Saint-Constant
- Saint-Eustache
- Saint-Hubert ‡
- Saint-Jean-sur-Richelieu
- Saint-Lin †
- Saint-Luc
- Saint-Nicolas
- Saint-Romuald
- Victoriaville

† indicates current Le Superclub Vidéotron locations. Both are affiliated with Club Vidéo Flash.
‡ indicates former Le Superclub Vidéotron locations affiliated with Club Vidéo Flash.

== Logos ==
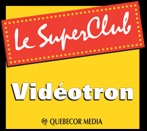
Logo used from 1989 until 2007 (the Quebecor Media name was added in 2001 after the sale of Vidéotron at Quebecor)

Logo used from 2007 until 2011

Logo used from 2011 until 2017
