= Groupe Dynamite =

Canadian clothing retailer

Groupe Dynamite Inc.
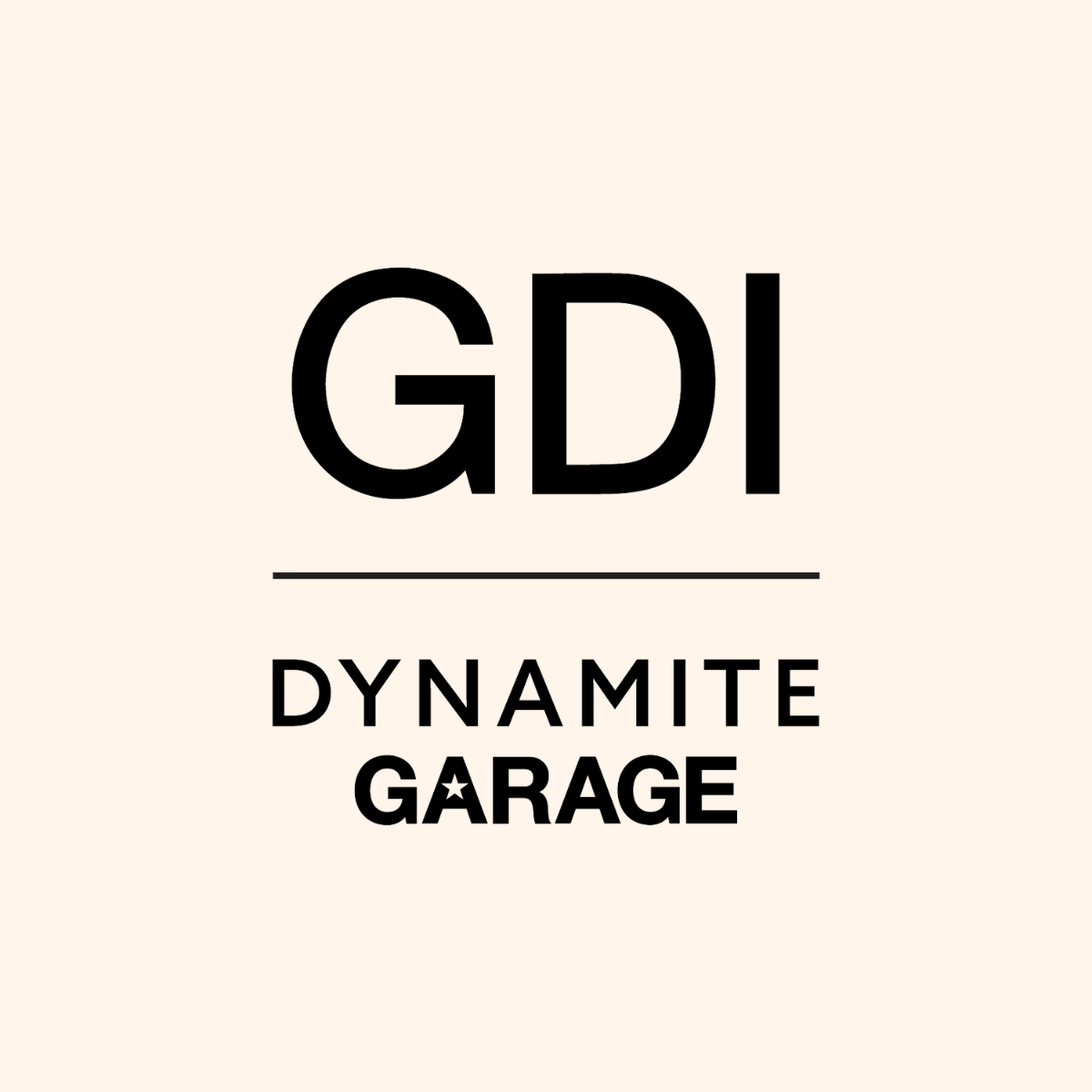
- Company type: Public
- Traded as: TSX: GRGD
- Industry: Fashion; Retail
- Founded: 1975; 51 years ago in Montreal, Quebec, Canada
- Headquarters: Ville Mont-Royal, Quebec, Canada
- Number of locations: 300 stores (2024)
- Key people: Andrew Lutfy (CEO)
- Products: Clothing
- Brands: Dynamite Clothing; Garage
- Revenue: CA$888 million (2024)
- Net income: CA$128 million (2024)
- Owner: Andrew Lutfy (87%)
- Number of employees: 6,000 (2024)
- Website: groupedynamite.com

Groupe Dynamite Inc. (TSX: GRGD) is a Canadian clothing company that was founded in 1975 as Garage. The company creates, designs, markets and distributes from its head office in Montreal, Quebec, and operates over 300 stores across Canada and the United States, with around 6,000 employees (as of 2024). Groupe Dynamite offers women's fashion apparel catered to Generation Z and Millennials through its banners; GARAGE and DYNAMITE.

== History ==
=== Garage ===
Created in 1975, the Garage banner was the beginning of the current company.

=== Groupe Dynamite ===
Groupe Dynamite was established in 1984. In 2020, while the COVID-19 pandemic prompted a restructuring, the company emerged with stronger lease terms and a more agile operating model. Groupe Dynamite has since demonstrated strong growth.

The company went public in November 2024 via an initial public offering on the Toronto Stock Exchange raising CA$300 million and valuing the company at CA$2.3 billion.
