= Gauri Viswanathan =

Indian-American literary scholar

- Born: 5 November 1950 (age 75); Calcutta (now Kolkata), West Bengal, India
- Awards: James Russell Lowell Prize (1998); Guggenheim Fellowship (1990)

Academic background
- Education: University of Delhi (BA, MA); Columbia University (PhD)

Academic work
- Discipline: English literature
- Institutions: Columbia University

Gauri Viswanathan (born 5 November 1950) is an Indian American academic. She is the Class of 1933 Professor in the Humanities and Director of the South Asia Institute at Columbia University.

== Biography ==
Viswanathan was born on 5 November 1950 in present-day Kolkata, the capital of West Bengal. Her parents were UN officials.

She earned her bachelor's and master's degrees from the University of Delhi and her doctorate from Columbia University. Her research has focused on nineteenth-century British and colonial cultural studies.

She is the author of Masks of Conquest: Literary Study and British Rule in India (1989), which won the James Russell Lowell Prize from the Modern Language Association, and Outside the Fold: Conversion, Modernity, and Belief (1998), which won the Harry Levin Prize awarded by the American Comparative Literature Association. She also received a Guggenheim Fellowship in 1990 and was a Mellon Fellow in 1986.
