= Gotstyle =

Clothing retailer in Toronto

- Type: Private
- Industry: Clothing retailer
- Founded: 2005; 21 years ago
- Founder: Melissa Austria
- Headquarters: Toronto, Ontario
- Website: gotstyle.com

Gotstyle is a Toronto-based clothing retailer. The first store was opened in 2005 by owner Melissa Austria. Since then it expanded to two locations: 62 Bathurst St. and 21 Trinity St. in the Distillery District.

== History ==
The opening of the first store on King St. W was documented on Opening Soon aired on HGTV.

== Awards & Recognitions ==
- In 2015, it was listed on Sharp Magazine's "11 Most Unique Retailers Around the World".
