= LIJA Style =

Canadian woman's leisure apparel company

LIJA Style Inc
- Company type: Private company
- Industry: Clothing industry
- Founded: 1997; 29 years ago
- Founder: Linda Hipp
- Headquarters: Vancouver, British Columbia, Canada
- Area served: Canada, USA, Mexico, Australia, Malaysia, UK, Portugal, Spain, UAE, and South Africa
- Products: Women's Golf, Tennis, Run, Studio apparel
- Website: www.lijastyle.com

LIJA Style (/ˈliːʒə/; "leisure"), commonly referred to as LIJA, is a Canadian fashion company founded by Linda Hipp, who is also the President and head designer for the company. LIJA designs women's studio, run, tennis, and golf clothing in order to inspire healthy and active lifestyles for the youthful-minded women around the world. The company's motto is Play Beautifully.

== Company history ==
Based in Vancouver, BC, the company was originally incorporated as Hyp Golf in July 1997, selling only on women's golf clothes. Linda's innovative designs incorporated elements of European runway fashions, challenging the previously conservative market. By the end of their first year, Hyp Golf was sold in over 25 retailers and endorsed by Pearl Sinn (the first LPGA player to endorse the brand on tour) who won the Rolex First-Time Award at the State Farm Classic wearing Hyp Golf.

Other LPGA players who wore Hyp Golf on the LPGA tour include Jill McGill, Grace Park, Kelli Kuehne, Jennifer Greggain, Jamie Hullett, Carin Koch and several others. Hyp Golf fashions were also seen on celebrities including Cheryl Ladd, Catherine Bell, Joumana Kidd, ex-wife of NBA star Jason Kidd, and Stefanie Schaeffer from the popular TV show ‘The Apprentice'.

Hyp Golf entered the US market in 1999 garnering a reputation as a pioneer of stylish, feminine fit styles in women's golf apparel. Hyp Golf officially rebranded as LIJA after recognizing that the demand for Linda's designs, fusing sport and fashion, extended well beyond the golf course.

In 2007, LIJA developed partnerships with local distributors in Dubai, the United Arab Emirates, and South Africa, also opening its first US warehouse and beginning some overseas production. A partnership with a local distributor in the UK followed in 2008. In the same year, LIJA launched its Tour Style Leaders program with other notable players wearing LIJA on the golf course, including Christina Kim, Jane Park, Leta Lindley, Marisa Baena, Jennifer Greggain, Courtney Erdman, Brenda McLarnon and Georgina Simpson giving LIJA exposure on LPGA, Futures and European Tours. Leta Lindley and Georgnia Simpson later went on to become LIJA's tour style leaders for golf.

LIJA branched out its fashions in 2008, launching its first ever Leisure collection. In 2009, LIJA launched two more product categories - Active and Tennis - further developing the company's brand as an all-around activewear company. All three new product categories were created with the same philosophy as the golf collection: creating unique designs that enhance athletic performance yet have a fashionable edge.

In August 2009 LIJA signed on its first tennis player, Rebecca Marino, to represent its brand as a Tour Style Leader for tennis, after sponsoring her and volunteers at the Odlum Brown Vancouver Open in early August 2009.

== Recognition ==
- 2005 Canadian Golf Company of the Year—Score Golf magazine
- 2006 Business in Vancouver "BC's 50 Fastest-Growing Companies"
- 2007 Best of Show Honors at PGA Show—Golfing Magazine
- 2008 PROFIT 100 Rankings of Canada's Fastest Growing Companies 2007 "Business of the Year"—Richmond Chamber of Commerce *2007 PGA Magazine—Resort Top Seller and Private Course Top Seller
- 2008 PGA Magazine—Resort Top Seller and Private Course Top Seller
- 2008 PROFIT W100 Rankings of Canada's Top Women Entrepreneurs
- 2008 Executive of the Year – Score Golf Magazine
- 2009 The Hackers Paradise Golfer's Choice Award – Best Ladies Apparel
- 2009 Progressive Employer of Canada
- 2009 PROFIT 100 Rankings of Canada's Fastest Growing Companies
