= Hatley (surname) =

Hatley is a surname. Notable people with the surname include:

- Charles Hatley (born 1986), American boxer
- John Hatley (c. 1762 – 1832), English Royal Navy officer
- John E. Hatley (born 1968), United States Army soldier
- Johnny Hatley (1930-2002), American football coach and player
- Marvin Hatley (1905–1986), American film composer and music director
- Neal Hatley (born 1969), English rugby union player
- Rickey Hatley (born 1994), American football player
- Simon Hatley, English sailor and privateer
- Tim Hatley (born 1967), British scenic designer
