= Pajar =

Canadian fashion footwear retailer

- Type: Private
- Industry: Retail Manufacturing Shoes
- Founded: 1963 in Montreal, Québec, Canada
- Founder: Paul Golbert
- Headquarters: Montreal, Canada
- Website: www.pajar.com

Pajar is Montreal-based fashion footwear retailer.

== Business Operation ==
Pajar is a Canadian footwear and outerwear manufacturer and retailer. They manufacture their products in Canada, Europe and Asia. The company was founded in Montreal in 1963 by Paul Golbert. Pajar's name is derived from combining the first letters of the founder's name, his son’s name, and his wife’s name (Paul, Jacques, and Rachel) respectively. European sales are done via a regional head office in Amsterdam.

== History ==
The company was founded by Paul Golbert in 1963 after he immigrated to Montreal with his wife and son. Paul was born into a family of shoemakers in Paris, France in 1926.

Golbert first ventured into the Canadian footwear industry when he began to import Spanish, French, and Italian footwear, opening his first showroom in 1967. During this time, he also worked for Tyrol, a Canadian boot company. When the owners of Tyrol died, Paul took their key employees and started his own factory, becoming a producer of Canadian footwear in 1973. The factory, located in the Plateau district of Montreal on the corner of Mount Royal Avenue and Coloniale Street, is still standing today.

The company remains in the family and is now run by Paul’s son, Jacques, and his grandson, Michel. In an article featured in The Montreal Gazette,

Pajar became the official provider for the Canadian Alpine Ski Team in 1989. Their products later expanded from their original Canadian market to become available worldwide.

== Products and Brands ==
Pajar’s original creations included the Zig-Zag, an après-ski leisure boot that featured a centre-zip and sheepskin lining. The Pajar Canada Heritage Premium collection is manufactured in the same factory that Paul opened in Montreal when he first became a producer of Canadian footwear in 1973. Other Pajar collections include outerwear such as rain-boots, winter coats, socks, bags, and hiking boots.
