= Silvert's =

Adaptive clothing retailer

Silvert's Adaptive Clothing & Footwear
- Type: Private
- Industry: Retail
- Founded: 1929
- Founder: I.D. Ed Alter
- Headquarters: Concord, Ontario, Canada
- Area served: North America
- Products: Adaptive clothing
- Website: silverts.com

Silverts Adaptive Clothing & Footwear, is a U.S. and Canadian based retailer that designs and distributes adaptive clothing and footwear for men and women. The company makes adaptive apparel that creates easy dressing solutions for people living with lowered mobility. Some of the variety of Silverts adaptive clothing includes clothing for wheelchair users, caregiver assisted clothing such as open back tops, easy access clothing with magnetic closures, as well as adaptive shoes, socks and slippers designed to assist people with lowered mobility in their daily dressing and undressing.

== History ==
In 1929, I.D Ed Alter founded Jack's Department Store in Ingersoll, Ontario, Canada. Jack's Department Store was initially a small town department store selling a range of products. After the death of I.D Alter, in 1978, his grandson, Jeffrey Alter joined the firm. In 1980, the company changed its name to Silvert's Clothing for Seniors and began specializing in adaptive clothing with Jeffrey Alter as CEO.

Silverts opened its head office, warehouse and retail store in Concord, Ontario, Canada. Silvert's had its first mobile store on the road in 1981 and in 1987, its first catalog for adaptive clothing was introduced. Silvert's sold its products mainly through mental-health institutions before selling directly to customers.

Silverts began expanding sales nationally for two years and started selling internationally in 1993. In 1995, Silverts had 41 full-time employees and 15 part-time staff. Silvert's has since grown in recent years with a 9.01 out of 10 rating on ResellerRatings.com on June 15, 2018.

In 2019, Careismatic Brands acquired Silverts. In January 2024, Careismatic Brands filed for Chapter 11 bankruptcy.

In November 2024, Silverts was purchased by management in an employee buyout. Silverts is now run out of Canada, owned and operated by its employees.

== Products ==
Silverts sells a wide variety of adaptive clothing ranging from wheelchair pants, shorts, open-back tops, dresses, nightwear, sportswear, and footwear, in addition to special-needs clothing accessories. Magnetic closures, elastic waists, and Velcro closures are some of the features that Silverts uses when designing its adaptive wear.

Silverts creates their own designs in Canada and its clothing is manufactured in both Canada and China.

Because many of Silverts clothes are worn by people in home care facilities, Silverts clothing and even some slippers are designed to hold up to industrial washers.

== Sales and marketing ==
Silverts mainly sells its products online and through catalogs that the company produces twice a year. The Silverts website is designed for users to shop according to their specific disability and needs.

Silvert' uses social media such as Facebook, Instagram, TikTok and LinkedIn, where caregivers and family members can share ideas, experiences and reviews about Silverts products and service.

== Challenge Contest ==
In 2016, Silvert's participated in the Small Business Challenge contest sponsored by The Globe and Mail and Telus Corp. and was amongst the top 50 honorable-mention winners.
