= Tip Top Tailors =

Canadian retail clothing chain

- Type: Subsidiary
- Industry: Fashion
- Founded: Toronto, Ontario, Canada (1909)
- Founder: David Dunkelman
- Headquarters: Toronto, Ontario, Canada
- Area served: Canada
- Products: Menswear, suits, tuxedos rentals, casual wear, sportswear and outerwear
- Parent: Dylex (1966–2000); Grafton-Fraser (2000–2017); Grafton Apparel Ltd. (2017-present)
- Website: TipTopTailors.ca

Tip Top Tailors is a Canadian retail clothing chain, selling primarily menswear: suits, tuxedos, casual wear, sportswear and outerwear; as well, most stores have an in-house tailor (provides tailoring for clothing purchased within the store).

Tip Top Tailors operates 102 stores across Canada and is a division of Grafton Apparel Ltd. The first Tip Top Tailors opened in 1909.

== History ==
Tip Top Tailors was a Canadian menswear clothing retailer founded in Toronto in 1909 by Polish-Jewish immigrant David Dunkelman (1883–1978). He rented his first store at 245 Yonge Street, Toronto, selling tailored suits for $14. The name of the chain was chosen by a customer in a contest. A now landmark building that housed the manufacturing, warehousing, retail and office operations for Tip Top Tailors was built at 637 Lake Shore Boulevard West, Toronto, Ontario. This building was designed by architect and engineer Roy H. Bishop in a classic Art Deco style. Construction was completed in 1929. Founder David Dunkelman's son Ben Dunkelman (1913–1997) served as president of Tip Top Tailors after his father stepped down in 1950 until he eventually sold the company to the newly formed Dylex Limited in 1967. The history of Tip Top Tailors after 1967 is inextricably intertwined with that of Dylex Limited.

The first discussions concerning the formation of Dylex took place during a lunchtime meeting in December 1966. On one side of the table sat Jimmy Kay, a Toronto-based entrepreneur with business interests in housewares, plastics, and lighting. On the other side sat representatives of the Posluns family, who for three generations had been involved in the Toronto garment industry. The Posluns and Kay had never met each other prior to the meeting (an auditor who worked for both Kay and the Posluns had arranged the meeting) but they were both interested in acquiring the same company, Tip Top Tailors. By 1967 Tip Top Tailors had lost its luster and had deteriorated into "an old broken-down chain" according to Toronto broker Donald Tigert. The Posluns were primarily interested in acquiring the company's 5-story head office building on Lake Shore Boulevard. They had previously approached the Dunkleman family about buying the building alone, but the Dunkleman family declined the offer, wishing to sell the entire business if they sold it at all. Jimmy Kay, however, was more interested in buying the Tip Top Tailors chain of stores than the head office building, a proposition the Dunklemans also rejected. Separately, each side had failed in their bid to acquire Tip Top Tailors, but during the course of lunch they agreed to pool their efforts and offer the Dunklemans the deal they wanted. Thus began a business relationship that would endure for the next quarter century.

The Dunklemans agreed to the joint bid by the Posluns and Kay, who formed a new company named Dylex, which concurrently went public, to serve as the holding company for Tip Top Tailors. The name Dylex, which had once been used by Kay for one of his holding companies, was an acronym for "damn your lousy excuses," a phrase that reflected the mentality of the company's new management. Kay and the dominant Posluns family member, Wilfred Posluns, established a reputation for acquiring ailing retail chains and injecting them with new life, a characteristic of their jointly controlled company as it developed into a retail giant. Tip Top Tailors was the first example of a rapid turnaround, a company whose former executives offered numerous reasons for its anemic performance, none of which were accepted by Kay or Posluns. Instead, Dylex management applied what one industry pundit characterized as a "don't-stand-for-any-nonsense" style of management, sharpening the chain's focus on its target clientele. In its first year under Dylex control, the floundering 52-store chain regained its lost vitality, registering $37 million (CAD) in sales by the end of 1967.

After a decline in its numerous retail enterprises, Dylex Limited sold the Tip Top Tailors chain to Grafton-Fraser Inc. in July 2000. In May 2007 majority ownership of Grafton-Fraser was sold to an affiliate of Gordon Brothers Group.
