= Hatley, Georgia =

Unincorporated community in Georgia, U.S.

Coordinates: 31°53′58″N 83°36′48″W

Hatley is an unincorporated community in Crisp County, in the U.S. state of Georgia.

== History ==
A variant name was "Malone". A post office called Malone was established in 1904, the name was changed to Hatley in 1917, and the post office closed in 1945. W. H. Malone was the name of its first postmaster.
