= Morsam Fashions =

Morsam Fashions Inc.
- Company type: Subsidiary
- Industry: Apparel
- Founded: 1917
- Defunct: 2022
- Headquarters: Montreal, Quebec, Canada
- Key people: Steven Lupovich (CEO), Carl Kleinberg, Ruth Redman, Cathy Krajewski
- Products: Sleepwear, bathrobes, lounge wear
- Number of employees: 110 (25 in Montreal 2 in the USA and 90 in china) (2022)
- Website: http://jasminerosesleepwear.ca/ at the Wayback Machine (archived January 25, 2022)

Morsam Fashions was a Canadian manufacturer and designer of women's bathrobes, sleepwear, and loungewear based in Montreal. It was established in 1917. It was best known for its Jasmine Rose label of apparel, as well as Morning Glory, Noire, and others, sold in major retailers in North America. U.S. retailers selling the company's terry robes included JCPenney, Sears, Macy's, and Walmart.

In 2022, Morsam Fashions filed a breach-of-contract lawsuit against QVC for allegedly unpaid purchase orders.

== History ==
Morsam Fashions was started in Montreal, Quebec, Canada, in 1917 by two Romanian brothers named Samuel Lupovich and Moe Lupovich who came to Montreal by boat as young boys. The company started off as a women's uniform company. It was later bought by their grandson Steven Lupovich, who became the President of the company.

By 2017, Morsam became the second largest design and importer of ladies' robes and lounge wear in North America. Its imports represent 8% of all the robes imported from China into the USA and Canada. Morsam as a whole imports over 3,000,000 units per year.

The Morsam group's product line featured women's sleepwear, loungewear, and robes. These items were marketed under the brand names Jasmine Rose, Morning Glory, and Noire, as well as several private label brands for major retailers. Additionally, Morsam fashions held licenses for the Jones New York, Buffalo, and Danskin brands.
