= ShirtPunch =

Canadian online clothing retailer

ShirtPunch, Inc.
- Company type: Privately held company
- Industry: Retail
- Founded: Toronto, Ontario, Canada (October 25, 2011)
- Headquarters: Toronto, Ontario, Canada
- Key people: Russ Montague (Founder)
- Products: Apparel, T-Shirts
- Website: ShirtPunch.com

ShirtPunch is a Canadian internet retailer for apparel. ShirtPunch won Canada Post's E-commerce Innovation Award.

== Specialty ==
ShirtPunch specializes in nerd and pop culture themed t-shirts and sweatshirts. Each design offered is available for 24 hours, with new designs made available daily. ShirtPunch utilizes a community of independent artists and designers, with designs frequently featuring mashups of pop culture, video game, anime and comic book themes. ShirtPunch also featured licensed partnerships with Adventure Time, Star Wars, Kevin Smith and other media.

== Collaboration ==
ShirtPunch frequently collaborates with celebrities who design or were featured in their apparel, including: Stan Lee, Kevin Smith, Jason Mewes, Ricky Gervais, Rupert Grint, Laurence Fishburne and Warwick Davis. Some of these designs have been in support of organizations such as Little People UK, Make A Wish Foundation and THRIVEGulu, with 100% of proceeds going to charity. ShirtPunch also partnered with Canada Post in support of the Canada Post Community Foundation for Children.

In July 2017, ShirtPunch shut down, without any public explanation. In August 2017, its parent company, Fan Blocks, filed for bankruptcy.

In October 2017 ShirtPunch relaunched under new ownership.
