= Off the Wall (clothing retailer) =

Former Canadian clothing retailer

Off The Wall, founded in 1984 and closed in early 2011, was a former Canadian retailer of urban apparel, footwear, accessories and equipment. Off the Wall provided a wide variety of brands and styles all in one place.

Their own clothing line included the brands Song, Song Luxury, and Song Denim. They also carried such brands as, Adidas, Bench, Billabong, Converse, Guess, Hurley, Keds, Rocket Dog, Mavi, Puma, Roxy, Zoo York, Silver Jeans, Domino Jeans, BB Dakota, WeSC, Burton, DC, Element, Steve Madden, Toms Shoes, Matix, Bula, and MOTO.

Off The Wall clothing operated 16 locations in British Columbia, Alberta and Ontario, including: the original location: Westwood Mall, Downtown Vancouver, Guildford Town Centre, Metropolis at Metrotown, Lougheed Mall, Richmond Centre, Sevenoaks Shopping Centre, Willowbrook Shopping Centre, Mayfair Shopping Centre in Victoria, Aberdeen Mall in Kamloops, Orchard Park Shopping Centre in Kelowna, Chinook Centre, Crossiron Mills, West Edmonton Mall, Lime Ridge Mall, Georgian Mall, White Oaks Mall, and Coquitlam Centre.
