= Bluenotes =

Canadian clothing brand

Thrifty's Inc.
- Trade name: Bluenotes (2000–present)
- Formerly: Thrifty's
- Type: Subsidiary
- Industry: Fashion
- Founded: Toronto, Ontario, Canada (1942)
- Headquarters: 1203 Caledonia Road, Toronto, Ontario, Canada
- Area served: Canada; United States
- Products: Jeans, Graphic Tees, Onesies, Sweaters, Dresses, Hoodies, Plaids, Polos, Footwear, Swimwear, and Clothing Accessories
- Parent: Dylex (1984–2000); American Eagle Outfitters (2000–2004); YM Inc. (2004–present)
- Subsidiaries: Thriftys by Bluenotes
- Website: www.blnts.com

Bluenotes (formerly Thrifty's) is a Canadian lifestyle clothing brand. Bluenotes currently operates 120+ stores in Canada, across all major provinces, and includes an online store. Thrifty's' 107 stores were bought out by U.S. retailer American Eagle Outfitters from Dylex and rebranded the store with name Bluenotes in 2000. Eventually, the division was sold to privately owned YM, Inc. in 2004.

== Products ==
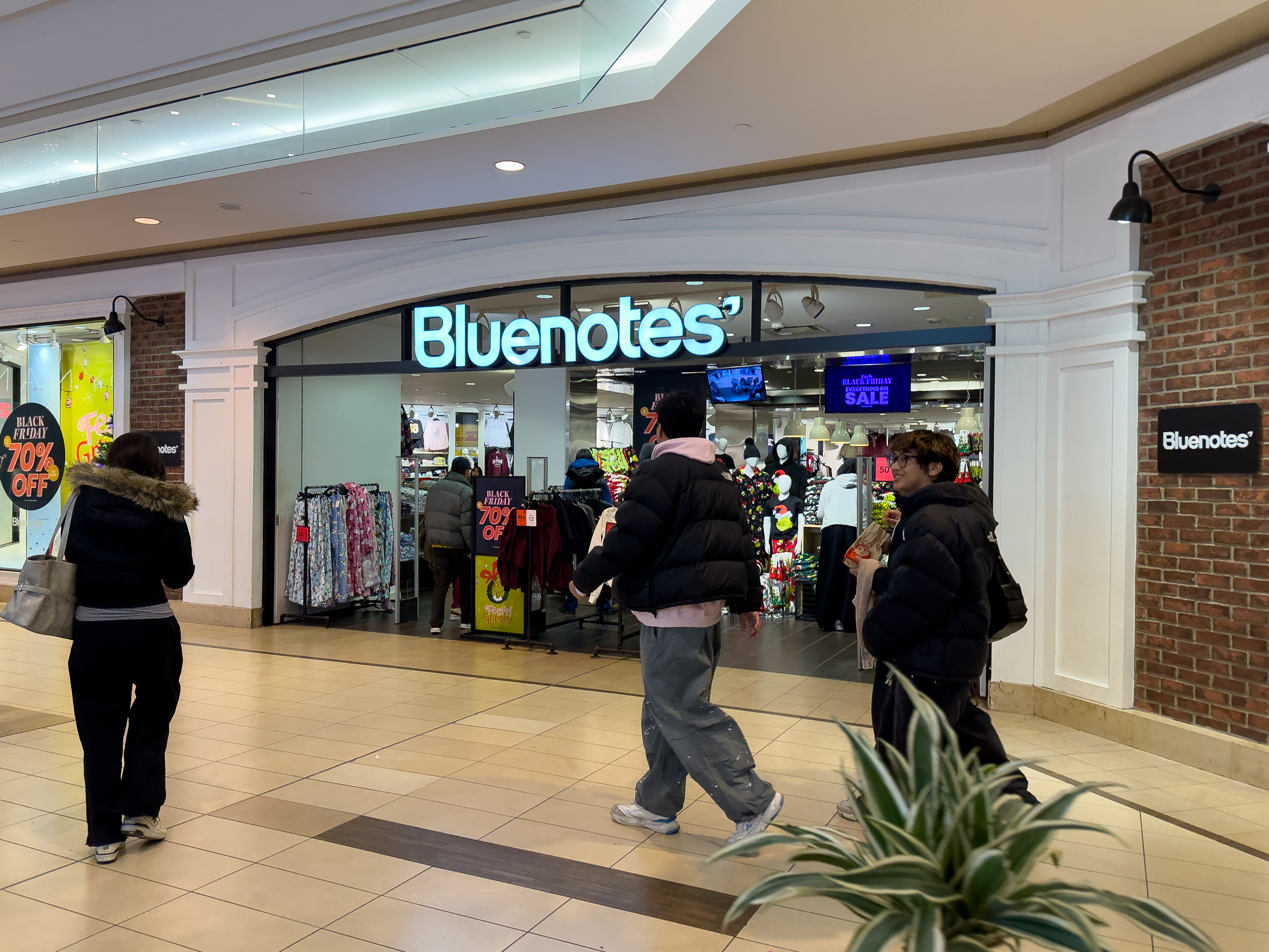
A Bluenotes store at the Scarborough Town Centre

Bluenotes sells casual clothing with an emphasis on denim. They focus on wardrobe basics, such as hoodies, t-shirts, and jeans.

In 2019, Bluenotes stores became the Canadian license partner of Aéropostale, which had ceased operating in Canada in 2016.

== Marketing strategy ==
Bluenotes markets their clothing to Canadian teenagers, originally focusing on denim, graphic tees, and accessories during their revitalization in the 2000s.

In 2008, ad agency MacLaren McCann created the "If Jeans Could Talk" campaign to link the Bluenotes brand with their denim line.
