= Hatley (brand) =

- Type: Private
- Industry: Retail Manufacturing Clothing
- Founded: 1987 in Hatley, Québec, Canada
- Founder: John and Alice Oldland
- Headquarters: Saint-Laurent, Quebec, Canada
- Area served: Canada; US; UK
- Number of employees: 140

Hatley is a Montreal-based retailer and wholesaler of gifts and apparel. Founded in 1987, the company is best known for its PVC-free rain gear and cotton pyjamas.

== History ==
Hatley was established as a home-based business in North Hatley, Quebec, Canada, by John and Alice Oldland in 1986. Alice, an artist, operated a gift shop named "The Little Blue House" and created artwork in her studio. To support local charitable causes, Alice donated hand-painted aprons for auction. Recognizing the potential market for these designs, John sold 200 aprons to kitchen stores during a trip to Toronto.

Upon retiring in 1999, John and Alice transferred ownership of the company to their sons, Chris, Nick, and Jeremy. The company headquarters relocated from North Hatley to Montréal under the new management. The sons diversified the product line to include children's apparel, women's sleepwear, and a range of gift items such as napkins, kitchen textiles, mugs, and accessories.

As of 2022, products are sold in approximately 3,300 stores in North America and in over 20 countries. They have a direct-to-consumer website and 13 corporate stores in North America, with the latest opening in Annapolis, Maryland.

Hatley expanded its operations to Europe in 2014 by establishing a warehouse in Portsmouth, England. The company followed this with the opening of its first European retail store in Chiswick, London, in July 2015. To support its European market, Hatley also launched a dedicated UK website.
