= Designer Depot =

Canadian deep discount department store

- Type: Off-price department store chain
- Industry: Retail
- Founded: 2004
- Headquarters: Toronto, Ontario, Canada,
- Products: Clothing, footwear, accessories.
- Parent: Hudson's Bay Company (2004–2008); INC Group of Companies (2008–2016, 2021- Present)
- Website: http://www.designerdepot.ca (defunct)

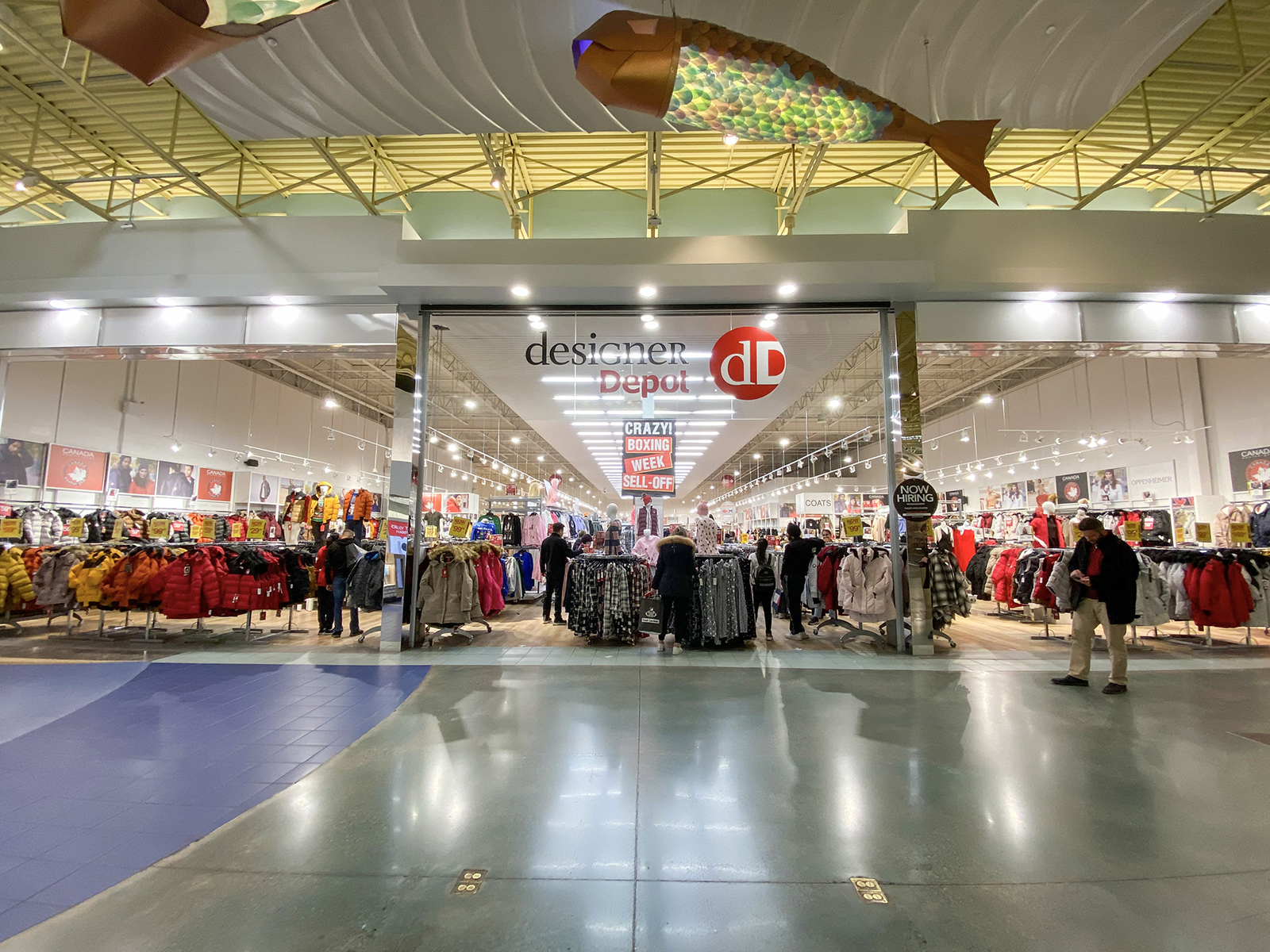
Designer Depot in Vaughan Mills

Designer Depot is a Canadian deep discount department store and liquidation store that sold brand names at prices 25 to 60% below regular department and specialty store prices. Retailer Hudson's Bay Company (HBC) created the division in November 2004 and sold it in April 2008 to the INC Group of Companies.

The first location opened as part of the Vaughan Mills Mall in Vaughan, Ontario. Weekly shipments of clothing originated from Fairweather and associated chains. The merchandise was sourced through order cancellations by other retailers, excess stock, liquidations, not passing 100% quality check or bankruptcies.

Their slogan was "Designer Labels. Depot Prices."

The average store size was 32,000 square feet (3,000 m^{2}).

== See also ==
- Hudson's Bay Company
