= Dylex =

Canadian retailer

Dylex Limited
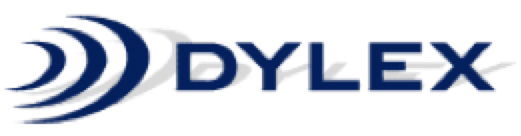
- Type: Public company
- Industry: Retail
- Founded: 1966 in Toronto, Ontario, Canada
- Founders: Jimmy Kay and Wilfred Posluns
- Defunct: 2001
- Headquarters: Toronto, Ontario, Canada
- Subsidiaries: NBO Stores, Inc.

Dylex Limited was one of Canada's largest retailers during the 1970s and 1980s, where it operated a number of specialty retail stores, including womenswear, menswear and family stores, including BiWay, a large and now defunct Canadian discount chain.

== History ==
Dylex was formed in 1966 as a holding company for the purchase of Tip Top Tailors through a partnership between Jimmy Kay, a decorated World War II veteran and businessman, and Wilfred Posluns, a former stockbroker. The company name was an acronym for "Damn Your Lousy Excuses." It absorbed Posluns' company and Kay's Fairweather stores. From the start the company maintained retail and manufacturing operations. After a year, the company's sales at its menswear stores had reached $37 million.

In 1984, Dylex purchased 50% of NBO Stores Inc., a 28-store chain of men's clothing discounters founded in Yonkers in 1971 as National Brands Outlet by Leon Atkind. In 1988, it purchased the remaining 50% from Atkind for $25 million (equivalent to $68,057,000 in 2025) in cash. At the time, the company was generating $100 million-a-year in sales.

== Operations ==
The company's strategy was to purchase clothing stores but to leave the running of the company in its current management's hands.

The company later purchased Harry Rosen Inc. from its founder, Harry Rosen. Rosen later bought back his company in 1992. The company recorded explosive growth during the 1970s and 1980s - operating 17 chains with more than 2,700 stores in the United States and Canada at its peak. In 1980, its annual sales reached $650 million.

=== Divisions ===
At one point, the company had five business divisions: BiWay, a major discount basic apparel and general merchandise, Thriftys (denim and other jeanswear and accessories), Tip Top Tailors (mid-priced men's suits and sportwear), and its women's wear group, made up of Fairweather (women's career and casual clothing), Big Steel Man (a.k.a. Big Steel and in its final days Steel) and Braemar (women's tailored clothing and accessories). The company operated 638 stores across Canada.

In 1999, Dylex created a new chain offering off-price brand name clothing and accessories named Labels, in an attempt to have a chain competing with the current leader of that category, Winners. This new venture was not successful, and by the end of 2000, the chain was purchased by the TJX Companies Inc (operators of the TJ Maxx and TK Maxx stores in the United States and Europe), and then folded into their Winners/HomeSense chain.

BiWay Stores accounted for 54% of fiscal 2000 revenues; Thriftys, 14%; Fairweather, 12%; Tip Top Tailors, 12%; Braemar, 7%; and Labels, 1%.

== Demise ==
Co-founders Posluns and Kay eventually developed bad blood and the company's expansion into the United States, which was funded by heavily leveraging its purchases, proved to be the beginning of the end for the company. Kay left the business in the early 1990s. In 1995, the company sought bankruptcy protection. In 2000, the company sold its Thriftys, Braemar and National Logistics divisions to American Eagle Outfitters. The remainder of the company were sold off by 2001.

=== Biway ===
BiWay was acquired by Hardof Wolf Group, a shell company for the United States-based McCrory Stores, a dollar store chain owned by Meshulam Riklis. The Fairweather chain was purchased by a private Canadian investment consortium. McCrory had announced its intentions to convert all of the BiWay stores into a dollar store chain to be named Dollar Zone, named after their chain of dollar stores in the United States.

These plans did not go through, however, and in August 2001, all BiWay stores, save for a few Toronto area locations, were shuttered for good and Hardof Wolf left with all of the employees' money. The courts finally forced Hardof Wolf to pay back some of the money it owed to the employees. This court case set precedent in Ontario bankruptcy case law. It was later reported that Riklis had drained money from Dylex to be used in other Riklis owned companies.

=== Revival ===
In December 2018, it was announced that the BiWay chain would be revived as "BiWay $10 Store" beginning with a new 7,500 square foot location in August 2020 in Toronto. These plans are, however, on hold after the death of its founder in October 2020.
