= Garage (clothing retailer) =

Clothing store in America and Canada

- Type: Subsidiary
- Industry: Retail
- Founded: 1975
- Headquarters: Montreal, Quebec, Canada
- Number of locations: 213 (2024)
- Areas served: Canada, United Kingdom, United States
- Key people: Andrew Lutfy CEO
- Products: Apparel, accessories
- Parent: Groupe Dynamite
- Website: www.garageclothing.com

Garage is a clothing store, primarily targeting young women. Founded in Montreal, Canada in 1975 as a subsidiary of Groupe Dynamite, Garage currently has locations in Canada and the United States. In 1975, Garage Clothing was established as a Groupe Dynamite subsidiary. Andrew Lutfy, a Montreal billionaire businessman who began working as a stock clerk at the first Groupe Dynamite store in 1982, is the owner of Groupe Dynamite. Lutfy became the sole owner of Groupe Dynamite by 2002.

In September 2020, Garage's parent filed for creditor protection under the Companies' Creditors Arrangement Act. They did this as a direct result of the COVID-19 crisis, in order to reorganize its financial and business problems. Early in 2020, Groupe Dynamite, Inc. was once again surpassing expectations following record performance in 2019, but COVID-19 put an unanticipated and unsustainable pressure on the company. The Montreal-based retailer and its Board of Directors were forced to confront the reality.

== Controversy ==
In 2024, Garage added content for the company's new denim promotion. The ad campaign featured ladies dancing to a bass-heavy song while modeling the jeans and taking off their tops and bottoms. Online shoppers quickly criticized the advertisement, claiming it was overly sexualized, did not include people of various sizes, and would even be harmful to younger viewers. There are more than a dozen posts on the brand's Instagram page, and nearly all of them are besieged with negative comments urging the campaign to halt. Groupe Dynamite's Garage cleaned up its social media profiles on July 15 and added content for the company's new denim promotion.

== Collaborations with influencers ==
Garage Clothing launched a body positive product line called B.DY which is promoted by Chloe Bailey in the media.

Garage Clothing has also worked with TikTok star Caroline Ricke who is famous for comedic sketches in which she adopts the role of an irritating rich girl.
