= West 49 =

Canadian specialty retailer

West 49 Inc.
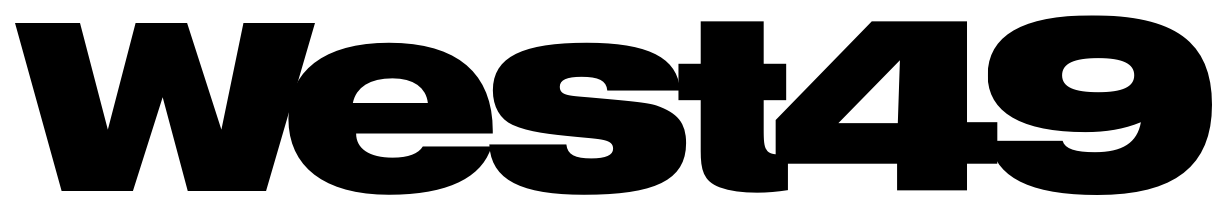
- Formerly: Jumbo Entertainment, Inc. (1987–2004)
- Type: Subsidiary
- Genre: Clothing, Skateboarding, snowboarding
- Founded: 1987 (company); 1995 (retail); 2004 (corporate restructuring)
- Founder: Sam Baio
- Headquarters: 1203 Caledonia Road, Toronto, Ontario, Canada
- Key people: Michael Gold & Michael Roden (CEO)
- Revenue: ▲$195.3 million (2006)
- Owner: Michael Gold; Michael Roden
- Number of employees: > 1,000 employees (2005)
- Parent: Billabong (2010–2013); YM Inc. (2013–present)
- Website: west49.com

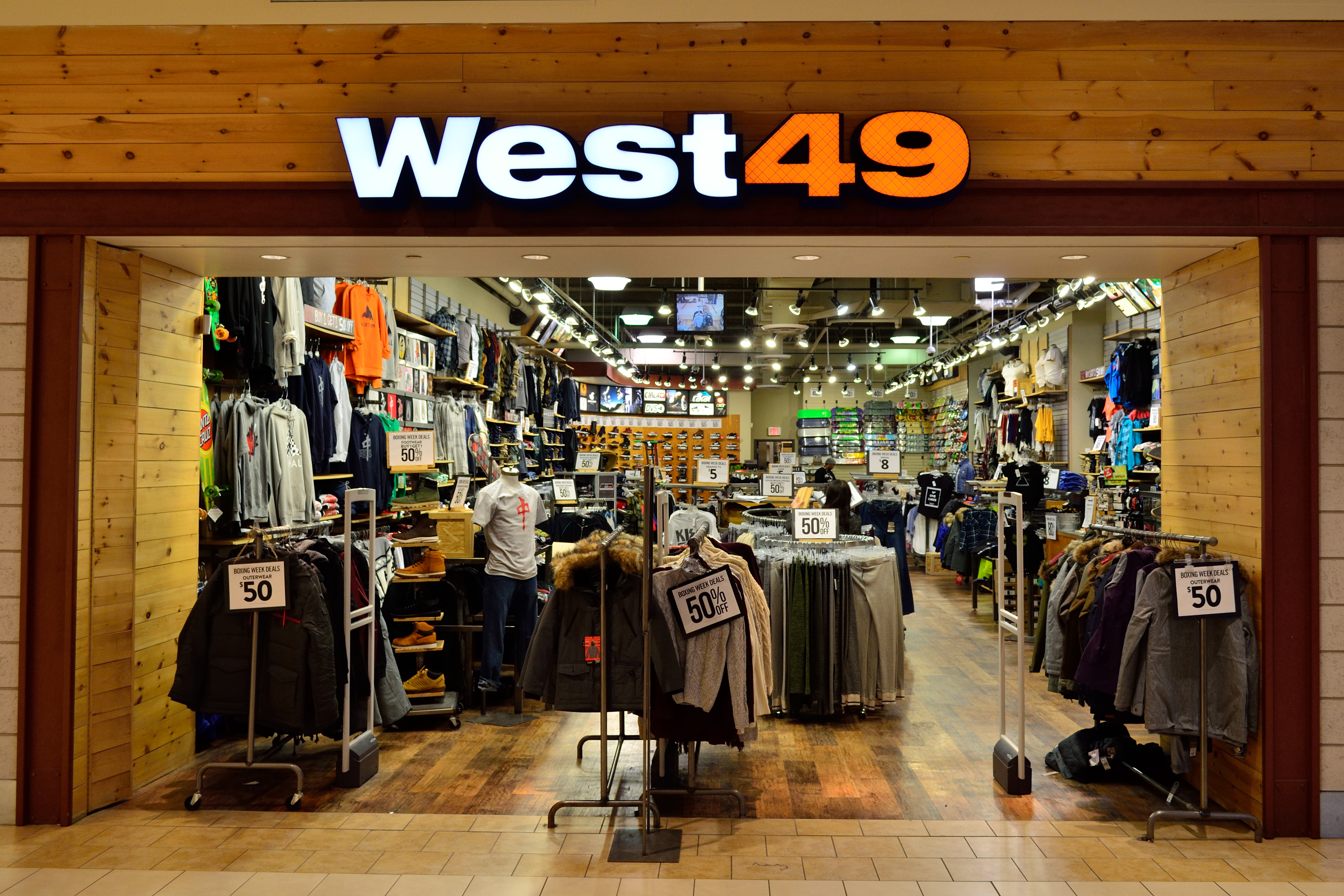
West 49 store in the Bramalea City Centre

West 49 Inc. is a Canadian specialty retailer of fashion and apparel, footwear, accessories, and equipment related to the action sports lifestyle. The company was founded in 1987 as Jumbo Entertainment, Inc. to manage the Jumbo Video franchised video stores. It adopted its current name in 2004 following the sale of its entertainment assets to Quebecor.

The retailer, founded in 1995, operates more than 100 stores across the country and is Canada's largest skateboard and snowboard chain. In 2005, it was ranked the 82nd fastest growing company in Canada. West 49 Inc. operates stores under several names: West 49, Billabong, Element Canada, and Amnesia/Arsenic. On November 4, 2013, YM Inc. was confirmed as the new parent company of the retail chain.

== History ==
West 49 was established in 1995 by CEO Sam Baio, who opened three stores in Ontario, Canada. The company has its origins in May 1987 as Jumbo Entertainment, Inc. when it managed the Jumbo Video video store franchise and at one point claimed to be the third-largest player in the Canadian video rental industry. It was well known for offering free popcorn to customers, regardless of whether they rented videos.

Starting in 2001, West 49 sponsored and hosted an annual international skate event, the West 49 Canadian Open. In 2005, Microsoft joined as a co-sponsor. The West 49 Canadian Open is not on the World Cup Skateboarding event schedule for 2007 and, as of 2013, is no longer active as an annual skateboarding contest event. As of 2005, the company operated 65 locations in seven provinces, employed nearly 1,000 employees, and reported US$86 million in revenue for the fiscal year ending January 29, 2005.

After financial issues that had been prevalent for many years, the assets of Jumbo Entertainment were purchased by Quebecor in 2004 and the shell company via a reverse takeover renamed the corporate entity to West 49, Inc.

On November 2, 2009, West 49 Ambition Skatecamp premiered on Bite TV. The show follows eight young amateur skateboarders as they vie for a grand prize that includes a profile in SBC Skateboard magazine and a chance to compete in the Maloof Money Cup, a professional skateboarding competition. Along with the placement of the chain's name in the show's title, West 49 is featured in product and logo shots throughout the series.

Two retailers, U.S.-based Zumiez and Australian-based Billabong, engaged in a bidding war to take over the company. In July 2010, Zumiez decided to end its takeover bid, clearing the way for Billabong to acquire West 49. On August 24, 2010, it was announced that shareholders had approved the sale. In September 2013, Billabong started the process of finding a new buyer for the retail chain due to the internal financial problems of the company.

Billabong's sale of the West 49 retail chain was announced on November 4, 2013, with fashion retailer YM Inc. identified as the buyer. West 49 will be sold for approximately CAD$9–11 million after Billabong originally paid CAD$99 million in 2010. The ownership of 92 West 49 retail stores, located across Canada, will be transferred through the deal.

== Brands ==
The chain carries an eponymous brand but mostly sells clothing by Californian brands.
