= List of retailers affected by the retail apocalypse =

The following retailers in the United States and Canada have all either closed or announced plans to close large numbers of retail locations, since 2010, deemed a "retail apocalypse" by media, accelerated by the 2008 financial crisis, the increase in online shopping, and the COVID-19 pandemic.

== Retailers 0-9 ==
- 7-Eleven closed 592 locations in the US in 2024 and 2025, following a 26% drop in purchases since 2019. Another 645 closures are planned for fiscal year 2026.
- 99 Cents Only Stores announced on April 4, 2024 that its 371 locations in the Western United States would begin to close. The COVID-19 pandemic, inflation, and shrink were cited as major reasons for the closure. The company had considered filing for bankruptcy prior to the announcement. Later, in May 2024, it was reported that Dollar Tree had acquired the leases of at least 170 former 99 Cents Only Stores locations, which would reopen as Dollar Tree stores beginning in the fall of the same year.

== A ==
- A.C. Moore announced on November 25, 2019 that all 145 of its stores would close. The Michaels Companies acquired A.C Moore's intellectual property, websites, and one distribution center for $58 million; Michaels also took over 40 store leases.
- Abercrombie & Fitch has closed numerous stores under its own brands, including Hollister Co. and abercrombie kids, since 2015.
- Advance Auto Parts announced in November 2024 the closure of 500 corporate stores, 200 independent stores, and four distribution centers, citing declining consumer demand. Said closures were completed by late March 2025.
- Aerosoles (AGI HoldCo) filed for Chapter 11 bankruptcy in September 2017 and closed 74 retail stores, leaving only four flagship stores in New York and New Jersey.
- Aéropostale filed for Chapter 11 bankruptcy in May 2016 and closed 113 stores in the United States, along with all of its 41 stores in Canada. It emerged from bankruptcy in September.
- A'gaci filed for Chapter 11 bankruptcy in February 2018 and announced plans to close 49 of its 76 stores. The chain filed for its second bankruptcy and liquidation on August 7, 2019, closing the remaining 54 stores with plans to auction its intellectual property.
- ALCO Stores filed for Chapter 11 bankruptcy on October 12, 2014; all of its stores were closed by March 2015.
- Aldo filed for bankruptcy on May 7, 2020, citing repercussions related to the COVID-19 pandemic. The shoe chain emerged from bankruptcy two years later.
- Alfred Angelo bridal stores shuttered all locations on July 13, 2017, with little advance notice. Frustrated customers were handed bankruptcy forms after walking away empty-handed. The company's corporate offices were abandoned and stores across the United States emptied and shuttered, but the store's official website remained active with no reference to the closure.
- Allbirds closed 23 retail locations in the United States in February 2026. This left the shoe retailer with just two outlet stores in California and Massachusetts and two full-price stores in London, down from 60 stores worldwide and 45 in the US in 2023. In March 2026, Allbirds sold its footwear business to American Exchange Group, and pivoted to making AI compute infrastructure.
- Amazon announced plans to shut down all 57 Amazon Fresh and 15 Amazon Go locations in early 2026. Some of the shuttered locations were converted to Whole Foods stores.
- American Apparel closed all of its stores, a total of 110, in April 2017 after being acquired by Gildan Activewear. 2,400 workers were laid off.
- American Eagle Outfitters announced that it would close up to 200 to 250 mall-based locations in January 2021 while expanding its subsidiary Aerie significantly. Shares rose for the company afterward, ending up making Aerie a brand of over two billion dollars. In January 2026, American Eagle announced plans to close a further 35 stores.
- American Freight announced that it would be closing all 328 of its locations on November 5, 2024 after its parent company, Franchise Group Inc., filed for bankruptcy.
- American Signature, Inc., which includes its namesake chain and Value City Furniture, filed for Chapter 11 bankruptcy protection in November 2025 as part of a plan to sell its assets via a stalking horse bid within 45 days. On January 9, 2026, after no buyers were found, the company announced the closure of all of its remaining locations under its two brands nationwide.
- The Andersons, a conglomerate based out of Toledo, Ohio, announced in January 2017 that it would close its remaining stores in Ohio. The stores closed in June 2017 after 65 years in business.
- Ann Taylor parent company Ascena Retail Group filed for Chapter 11 bankruptcy protection in July 2020, stating that it planned to permanently close a "significant" number of Justice stores, along with certain Ann Taylor, Loft, Lane Bryant, and Lou & Grey stores, in addition to permanently closing all of its stores in Canada, Puerto Rico, and Mexico, and closing all 326 stores under the Catherines brand. In November 2020, it was announced that the remaining Justice locations would be shuttered by early 2021.
- Apple plans to close three Apple Store locations in struggling shopping malls in Trumbull, Connecticut; Escondido, California; and Towson, Maryland in June 2026.
- Arden B closed all stores by 2015 as part of a turnaround plan by parent company Wet Seal.
- The Art of Shaving announced in January 2020 that parent company, Procter & Gamble, planned to close most of its 83 retail locations. As of 2024, the retailer has switched to an online-only model, after closing its last location in Orlando, Florida on January 2, 2024.
- Art Van Furniture, which had 300+ stores across the Midwest, announced on March 5, 2020, that it would close all stores. The company was founded by Archie "Art" Van Elslander, who opened the first store in 1959 in southwest Michigan.
- AT&T closed more than 250 locations permanently and laid off 3,400 of its staff in 2020.
- At Home announced in June 2025 that it would likely file for bankruptcy in days and close 20 of its 262 stores. It did so on June 16 and increased the store closure amount from 20 to 26.
- Avenue filed for Chapter 11 bankruptcy on August 9, 2019, shutting down all its stores and moving to e-commerce operations only.
- A&P, once America's largest retailer with 15,709 stores at its peak, closed its remaining supermarkets in November 2015 after 156 years in business. This included its namesake chain, along with Food Basics, The Food Emporium, Pathmark, Super Fresh and Waldbaum's, with over half of its stores sold to Acme Markets, Key Food (which included its Food Emporium chain and the Super Fresh trademark) and Stop & Shop.

== B ==
- Bargain Hunt, a Nashville, Tennessee-based discount retailer, closed all 92 locations in 10 states in February 2025.
- Barneys New York filed for bankruptcy on August 6, 2019. 15 of 22 stores closed, including Barneys flagship stores in Las Vegas, Chicago, and Seattle in addition to all but two of its outlet stores. In early 2020, it was announced that the remainder of Barneys' locations would be liquidated.
- Barnes & Noble closed 150 bookstores between 2010 and 2022. However, a turnaround in performance has led to plans to open 60 new stores in 2026.
- Bath & Body Works announced the closure of 50 US stores and one Canadian store, along with the opening of 26 new stores, in May 2020 due to sales slumping amidst the COVID-19 pandemic. Bath & Body Works closed 92 more stores in 2026, but refused to pull back from brick-and-mortar locations.
- BCBG Max Azria announced the closure of its stores in 2017, planning on going to department stores and online only. BCBG Max Azria Group filed for Chapter 11 bankruptcy protection on February 28, 2017, and was taken over by Marquee Brands and Global Brands Group.
- Bebe announced plans to close all stores and focus solely on online sales. At its peak, Bebe operated a total of 312 stores. However, by March 2017, this was down to 172.
- Bed Bath & Beyond announced in April 2019 that it would close 40 stores and also open 15 new stores that year. The company continued to struggle through the retail apocalypse, and in late summer of 2022, Bed Bath & Beyond announced plans to close 150 stores, lay off 20% of its corporate and supply chain staff, and eliminate the role of COO and CSO within the company. Liquidity was raised to about $1 billion after a loan and additional financing were secured. Bed Bath & Beyond's stock was also down on the market by 28%. Analysts warned that the company was teetering on the edge of a Chapter 11 bankruptcy filing, citing that it could be too late to turn things around and that the company could default on its debt. Further exacerbating the financial woes, CFO Gustavo Arnal committed suicide only a few days after the store closures were announced. After months of continued losses and empty shelves, the chain warned that it was unable to pay off its debts and would potentially file for bankruptcy. In late January 2023, Bed Bath & Beyond announced the closure of an additional 87 stores, the liquidation of its Harmon Face Values chain, and the closure of 5 Buy Buy Baby stores. On February 8, 2023, Bed Bath & Beyond announced that it would close another 150 stores, selling its stock and raising $1 billion in an effort to stave off a bankruptcy filing. Days later, the chain's Canadian division was declared insolvent and began closing its 54 stores, also winding down its Canadian Buy Buy Baby operations. When a lifeline from Hudson Bay Capital Management failed to supplement the struggling home goods retailer, in addition to a $300 million stock offering never coming to fruition, Bed Bath & Beyond finally filed for Chapter 11 bankruptcy on April 23, 2023, and announced that all of its remaining stores, including the entire Buy Buy Baby brand, would be shuttered, with liquidation sales starting on April 26. The chain's assets were purchased by Overstock.com in a June 2023 auction; Overstock announced its intention to rebrand its online operations to the Bed Bath & Beyond name. A subsequent auction for sister chain Buy Buy Baby fell through, and its assets were sold to New Jersey-based Dream on Me on July 13, 2023. An attempt to relaunch eleven Buy Buy Baby stores failed by October 2024, as the brand moved to an online-only model.
- Best Buy issued forecasts of a 2.2% compound annual growth rate through 2021; analysts noted that competition from Amazon.com likely played into the low growth expectations. Its shares dropped 10% in value (roughly $1.7 billion in market value) on the news. On March 1, 2018, Best Buy announced that it would close all 250 Best Buy Mobile stores in the United States by the end of May 2018. However, none of the Mobile locations in Canada were impacted by the US closures. Best Buy announced plans to close 10 to 15 stores every year as leases come up for renewal. They closed 24 stores in fiscal year 2024, followed by 10-15 in 2025 and a similar number planned for 2026.
- Big Lots announced in July 2024 that it would be closing 149 stores in 28 states, citing inflation and competition as the main causes of said closures. In August, additional store closures were announced, bringing the total of closing Big Lots locations to over 300. On September 9, 2024, Big Lots filed for Chapter 11 bankruptcy, planning to close additional stores upon being sold to its new owner, Nexus Capital Management LP. 50 of those additional stores were named in October, and another 56 were named within the month as well. While some closures ramped up, other locations cancelled liquidation sales and resumed regular operations. On December 19, 2024, Big Lots announced via a press release that its sale to Nexus fell through, and all 963 of its remaining stores would immediately begin going out of business. However, on December 28, 2024, Gordon Brothers, the company handling the liquidation sales, reached an agreement to sell up to 400 stores, two distribution centers, and intellectual property to Variety Wholesalers, which operates over 400 retail stores in the Southeast and Mid-Atlantic US under various banners; Variety Wholesalers planned to continue operating the acquired stores under the Big Lots brand and retain up to 10,000 employees.
- Blockbuster Inc. filed for bankruptcy in 2010; nearly all of its locations closed within years. As of March 1, 2019, only one video store worldwide, in Bend, Oregon, nicknamed The Last Blockbuster, remains out of over 9,000 the chain once had.
- Bloomingdale's announced in 2012 that it would close four stores, including at the Mall of America in Bloomington, Minnesota. Additionally, a home store at Oakbrook Center in Oak Brook, Illinois and full line stores in Perimeter Mall in Dunwoody, Georgia and at White Flint Mall in North Bethesda, Maryland have closed their doors. On January 3, 2013, Bloomingdale's announced that it would close the Las Vegas Home store at Fashion Show Mall.
- Bob's Stores closed all of its stores by July 14, 2024 as a result of bankruptcy.
- The Body Shop filed for administration on February 15, 2024, warning that a significant portion of its United Kingdom locations would close in the coming months. Just a day later, its German branch collapsed into administration and ceased operations, and most of its European branches were also expected to be placed into administration the next week. By the end of February, the Belgian and Danish branches of The Body Shop filed for administration, with all stores in both countries slated to close. In addition, 75 of its locations in the UK were also slated for closure. The following day, The Body Shop's Canadian division was declared insolvent; its online operations were shut down and 33 of its 105 locations were announced to be closing. The US division also filed for Chapter 11 bankruptcy and immediately ceased all operations.
- The Bon-Ton, a regional department store operator, filed for Chapter 11 bankruptcy on February 5, 2018. The company said it would close 42 stores. On April 17, 2018, The Bon-Ton announced plans to go out of business after being purchased by two liquidators.
- Borders, which included its namesake chain, along with Waldenbooks, filed for bankruptcy and closed all of its stores in 2011.
- Brooks Brothers filed for Chapter 11 bankruptcy in July 2020. It was announced that a fifth of its stores would be closed along with all three of its American factories.
- Brookstone filed for bankruptcy on April 3, 2014. On August 2, 2018, Brookstone announced it would be shuttering all its mall-based locations to focus on its website and airport locations, days after the company was considering filing for bankruptcy.
- Bose shut down all of its 119 retail stores in 2020 in order to follow a "dramatic shift" to online shopping only.
- Buckle was reported in 2026 to have quietly closed 24 stores in the past three years; it also opened 23 stores simultaneously.

== C ==
- Cache filed for Chapter 11 bankruptcy in 2015 after failing to turn a profit since 2011. All of its 153 stores, including the recently-opened flagship location at Fashion Show Mall in Nevada, were then liquidated.
- Carter's announced the closure of at least 200 stores in an earnings call in October 2020; the children's apparel chain planned to close about 80% of its locations by 2022. On October 28, 2025, Carter's announced the closure of 150 stores, cutting 300 jobs in the process.
- Cascade Farm and Outdoor's parent company Bi-Mart announced plans to close all five Cascade locations in spring 2026.
- Cato Fashions announced that it would close 120 stores by the end of 2026.
- Century 21 shuttered its 13 locations across the east coast of the US in September 2020 as a result of bankruptcy proceedings. The company, however, would announce the return of its New York City flagship store in spring 2023.
- Champs Sports owner Dick's Sporting Goods announced plans to close 125 Champs stores as part of its September 2025 acquisition of Foot Locker. Champs has 339 locations as of May 2026, down from a peak of 539.
- Charlotte Russe filed for Chapter 11 bankruptcy protection on February 4, 2019, and announced plans to close 94 stores. It had renegotiated its debts in 2018 and planned on liquidating if it could not be sold by February 17. It closed its online operation and began liquidating its brick-and-mortar inventory on March 7. Less than two weeks after all of its locations had been liquidated, the company announced a comeback and would reopen 100 locations in the United States.
- Charming Charlie filed for Chapter 11 bankruptcy protection on December 11, 2017, planning to close 97 of its stores. Charming Charlie emerged from bankruptcy in April 2018, but later announced in July 2019 that it would close all of its remaining locations. The company had a major resurgence 18 months after the second bankruptcy filing and reopened various locations, but the stores would then subsequently close not long after.
- Chico's FAS closed 120 stores by 2017 and another 50 stores closed by 2018. The company announced a further 40 store closings in June 2022.
- The Children's Place announced on June 11, 2020, that 300 stores across the United States, Canada, and Puerto Rico would be closing in the following months. On November 4, 2026, it was reported that The Children's Place would be filing for bankruptcy or even liquidation as soon as the following week. Five days later, it filed for Chapter 11 bankruptcy, beginning store closing sales and soliciting for buyers of some or all of its assets.
- Christmas Tree Shops filed for Chapter 11 bankruptcy on May 5, 2023, announcing its intention to close 10 underperforming stores out of a total of 82. The chain was a subsidiary of Bed Bath & Beyond until 2020. On July 4, 2023, Christmas Tree Shops announced that it had run out of the funds needed to sustain business operations, opting to instead liquidate all 70 of its remaining stores.
- Christopher & Banks filed for bankruptcy on January 14, 2021, and announced it would be closing all of its 449 stores in 44 states.
- Circuit City closed all of its stores on March 8, 2009. Systemax Inc. acquired the Circuit City website on April 13, 2009, but later discontinued it and consolidated all of its operations under the TigerDirect brand by the end of 2012.
- Claire's filed for bankruptcy on March 19, 2018, and closed 92 stores in the process. It emerged from bankruptcy in October. In July 2025, it was reported that Claire's was discussing a second bankruptcy filing after continued financial strain. Claire's officially filed for a second bankruptcy on August 6, 2025, and warned in the following days that it would close up to 1,100 stores and seek a buyer for another 800 stores. If that fell through, then the company would face total liquidation. On August 20, 2025, Claire's was purchased by private equity firm Ames Watson, saving 795 stores from the previously planned wave of 1,100 closures.
- Coldwater Creek closed all stores in 2014 and became an online-only retailer operated by Sycamore Partners until a new store opened in Burlington, Massachusetts in early 2018. However, that store and all remaining new locations closed by July 2020, likely due to the COVID-19 pandemic.
- CompUSA announced the closure of 103 stores in December 2007 and sold its e-commerce website and 16 physical locations to Systemax Inc. in January 2008. In November 2012, Systemax announced that it would retire the CompUSA and Circuit City brands and consolidate its North American consumer business under the TigerDirect brand by the end of the year.
- Conn's HomePlus filed for bankruptcy in July 2024 and announced that it would close 73 out of its 170 stores. Not long after, additional reporting clarified that Conn's intended to wind down operations of both itself and sister chain Badcock, with all closures expected to be completed by October 31, 2024.
- The Container Store filed for Chapter 11 bankruptcy in December 2024, but vowed to keep all 102 of its locations open.
- Crate & Barrel's children's line Land of Nod closed all of its retail stores in February 2018.
- CVS Pharmacy announced in November 2021 that it planned to close 900 stores over a three-year period, starting in spring 2022.

== D ==
- David's Bridal declared Chapter 11 bankruptcy in November 2018 to reorganize and shed $400 million in debt. On April 17, 2023, David's Bridal announced that it had filed for Chapter 11 bankruptcy again a week after laying off 9,000 workers. While it confirmed that its stores would stay open, it would liquidate if a buyer was unable to be found for the chain. On May 28, 2023, the UK division of David's Bridal collapsed and began liquidation sales, with its last known profit being in 2018. A few months later, on July 14, 2023, David's Bridal was purchased in a no-cash bankruptcy sale by Cion Investment Corp, saving the chain from total liquidation. Cion announced plans to keep two-thirds of the remaining locations open.
- DavidsTea announced in July 2020 that it would close all 42 of its US locations and 166 Canadian locations.
- Dean & DeLuca announced closures of 31 of its 36 US locations on July 11, 2019, while suffering from major cash flow problems.
- Deb Shops went through its second bankruptcy in December 2014 and closed all its stores in March 2015. The company continued as online only plus size retailer from September 2015 until 2018.
- Destination Maternity, owner of maternity chains Motherhood Maternity and A Pea in the Pod, filed for Chapter 11 bankruptcy in fall 2019 and announced the closure of 180 stores with more closures to be expected. All Motherhood Maternity and A Pea in the Pod locations were closed by the end of 2019, although A Pea in the Pod would eventually re-launch brick-and-mortar operations with concept stores in Chicago and New York.
- Dirt Cheap filed for bankruptcy on October 10, 2024 and announced that all of its discount stores would be liquidated.
- The Walt Disney Company announced on March 3, 2021 that at least 60 of its physical Disney Store locations in North America would close; instead, the company would focus more on its e-commerce operations.
- Dollar General announced in March 2025 that it would close 96 Dollar General and 45 Popshelf stores in the first quarter of 2025.
- Dressbarn announced the closing of the entire 650-store chain on May 21, 2019.

== E ==
- Eddie Bauer was reported to be preparing to file for Chapter 11 bankruptcy and the closure of all 200 of its stores in January 2026. Its e-commerce, wholesale, and manufacturing operations, as well as its stores in Japan, would not be affected by the bankruptcy filing. The chain officially filed for bankruptcy and liquidation on February 10, 2026.
- Express announced that it would be closing all of its Canadian stores in May 2017, citing a challenging Canadian retail environment and poor exchange rates. On February 12, 2024, it was reported that Express was running out of cash and was considering Chapter 11 bankruptcy. Two months later, on April 22, the retailer announced that it had filed for bankruptcy protection and would close over 100 stores, including the 10 stores belonging to sister brand UpWest. Express emerged from bankruptcy in June.

== F ==
- Family Christian Stores went out of business entirely in May 2017 and closed 240 stores.
- Family Dollar announced the closure of up to 390 of its 8,326 locations on March 6, 2019. Then-parent company Dollar Tree also said it would convert 200 others to Dollar Tree. An additional 970 Family Dollar stores were slated for closure in March 2024. In March 2025, Dollar Tree sold its interest in Family Dollar to private equity firms Brigade Capital Management and Macellum Capital Management for $1 billion; Dollar Tree had considered either selling or spinning off Family Dollar since June 2024.
- Family Video announced that it would close its remaining video rental store locations on January 5, 2021.
- Fingerhut parent company Bluestem Brands filed for Chapter 11 bankruptcy in March 2020. The catalog and online retailer began to wind down operations in summer 2025, issuing WARN notices regarding layoffs at their distribution center and corporate office effective August 27 and September 18, respectively. Effective October 2, 2025, Fingerhut's website was closed for new purchases.
- Forever 21 filed for Chapter 11 bankruptcy in late September 2019 due to the company's large amount of debt. It announced that it would close to close up to 178 of its 850 American stores and most of its stores in Europe and Asia. Speculation about the bankruptcy started to arise in late August 2019. In February 2025, reports broke that Forever 21 was preparing for a second bankruptcy filing in March. The filing detailed a plan to close 200 stores and seek a buyer; if no buyer was found, Forever 21 would liquidate all 350 of its stores instead. The fashion retalier had already initiated silent closing sales at multiple locations around the same time as reports of the bankruptcy filing. Forever 21 filed for bankruptcy on March 17, 2025, after failing to find a buyer; it announced that all of its locations in the United States would close, though its locations in other countries would remain open.
- Fossil announced some store closures and a restructuring campaign in 2016. Years later, the watch company was profoundly impacted by COVID-19 and announced the closure of at least 75 locations in March 2021. Fossil's woes continued, and after a leadership change and declining sales, it announced another restructuring that would shutter 50 stores. Going into 2026, seven locations were quietly closed, and 15 more were put on the chopping block, leaving Fossil with around 185 stores.
- Foot Locker announced plans to close 400 locations by 2026, mostly those underperforming in malls, to focus on experimental concepts and better customer outreach. The company was acquired by Dick's Sporting Goods in September 2025; Dick's announced plans to close further stores, although no definite list or timeline has been provided thus far.
- Francesca's filed for Chapter 11 bankruptcy protection on December 4, 2020, and 275 of its locations were closed. It was sold to TerraMar Capital LLC in January 2021 and exited from bankruptcy. On January 16, 2026, it was reported that Francesca's had started liquidation sales at all its locations and was planning to file for bankruptcy on January 20, when federal courts reopened after the MLK Day holiday.
- Fred's, a variety store and pharmacy chain based in the southeastern United States, filed for Chapter 11 bankruptcy on September 9, 2019, and announced that all of its remaining stores would be liquidated. At the time of Fred's bankruptcy filing, 80 stores remained out of the 568 that the company had operated in February 2019; the company had reduced its store count in multiple rounds since April in an attempt to improve profitability. The decline of Fred's was attributed in part to the aborted merger between the Walgreens Boots Alliance and Rite Aid in June 2017.
- Fry's Electronics abruptly closed all 30 of its stores and its online operations on February 24, 2021. The chain had struggled with empty shelves and supplier issues during its final years of operation, fueling speculation that it would close.
- Future Shop, an electronics chain in Canada, had all of its locations abruptly closed by owner Best Buy in March 2015, with 66 locations closing permanently and 65 locations reopening as Best Buy on April 4, 2015.

== G ==
- GameStop announced plans on September 10, 2019, to close between 180 and 200 underperforming stores by the end of the fiscal year. GameStop has been affected by a shift in consumer purchasing habits of games, as makers have made it easier to purchase titles online for download, often through consoles, requiring no physical disc. GameStop closed 1,000 stores in 2024 and revealed in 2025 that it would keep closing a "significant number" of its locations while also investing in cryptocurrency. More closures continued into 2026.
- Gander Mountain, an outdoor recreation retailer, announced in March 2017 that it was filing for bankruptcy and would likely close stores. In May 2017, the retailer announced that it was closing all 126 of its locations. However, CEO Marcus Lemonis then indicated that certain flagship stores, particularly in Michigan, might remain open depending on deals with store landlords and rental rates. It was later clarified that likely around 70 stores would remain open, even those currently running liquidation sales, possibly as Camping World, which acquired the company.
- Gap Inc. announced plans in September 2017 to close 200 stores in 2018, mostly Gap and Banana Republic stores while focusing its efforts on Old Navy and Athleta. On February 28, 2019, the company announced that it would split Gap Inc. into two separate companies, making Old Navy independent from Gap Inc. while at the same time announcing a closure of 230 Gap stores within the next two years.
- GNC closed over 900 stores in 2019, including between 300 and 400 of the chain's 800 shopping mall locations, which have been particularly hard-hit by declining foot traffic at malls overall.
- Godiva Chocolatier closed all of its North American retail locations in 2021 after the chocolate company faced a decrease in sales and foot traffic.
- Golfsmith filed for Chapter 11 bankruptcy and closed all stores in 2016. Assets were taken over by Dick's Sporting Goods and a select amount of locations became Golf Galaxy.
- Gordmans filed for bankruptcy on March 13, 2017, with half of its 100 stores and the Gordmans brand bought up by Stage Stores. Under Stage, Gordmans was converted to a discount store, which had a renaissance; Stage moved to convert some of its Peebles stores to Gordmans. However, in May 2020, it was announced that Stage had filed for bankruptcy and would be going out of business, liquidating its nearly 800 department stores with no buyer found for the chain.
- Grocery Outlet is set to close 36 stores in 2026.
- Guitar Center laid off 180 of its 7,000 employees in 2015; by 2018, the retailer was said to be on the verge of bankruptcy due to unsustainable debt loads and the decreasing popularity of musical instruments. The company eventually filed for bankruptcy in November 2020.
- Gymboree first announced in the summer of 2017 that it would close 375 to 450 stores, and subsequently announced in January 2019 that it would be shutting down all Gymboree and Crazy 8 stores after its second bankruptcy filing in two years. Its more upscale Janie and Jack business was sold to Gap.

== H ==
- Haggen, after expansion south of Washington state, filed for bankruptcy on September 8, 2015. On March 11, 2016, Albertsons reached an agreement to acquire the 29 "core" Haggen stores for $106 million, with 15 retaining the Haggen branding.
- Hancock Fabrics closed its remaining 185 stores in 2016 as a result of its Chapter 11 bankruptcy filing. A vast majority of its stores were sold to Michaels.
- Hastings Entertainment, which filed for bankruptcy in June 2016, closed all stores by the end of 2016.
- hhgregg, which filed for bankruptcy in March 2017, announced that it would close all 220 of its remaining locations in April 2017.
- H&M planned to close 200 locations out of 4,300 in 2026, starting with two NYC locations on January 19, 2026.
- HMV Canada announced that it would file for receivership on January 26, 2017, and close all of its stores by April 30, 2017.
- Henri Bendel announced in September 2018 that it would be shutting down by early 2019.
- Hudson's Bay Company announced in February 2019 that it would close all 37 Home Outfitters stores across Canada. In August 2019, the company announced that all Hudson's Bay locations in the Netherlands would be closed by the end of the year. The company had only entered the Dutch market two years previously. In March 2025, Hudson's Bay filed for creditor protection, warning that it would likely liquidate all of its stores, including every Saks Fifth Avenue and Saks Off 5th location in Canada. After a week of contentious court hearings, the 355-year-old company received permission to close all but six of its stores by June 30. However, the six exempt stores began closing sales not long after with the company giving up hope of finding a buyer for them.

== I ==
- Ikea closed store locations in Long Beach, California, Alpharetta, Georgia, Memphis, Tennessee, Southlake, Texas, and Arlington, Virginia between June 2025 and May 2026. Two more locations closed in late 2026.

== J ==
- JCPenney announced in February 2017 that it would close 138 stores in 2017. Liquidation sales began on May 22, and the stores closed by July 31. Another 8 stores and a distribution center closed in 2018 while over 50 additional stores were expected to close between mid-2019 and late 2020. JCPenney filed for bankruptcy on May 15, 2020, and announced plans to close at least 242 stores.
- JD Sports quietly closed 61 Hibbett Sports locations in 2025 and planned to close nearly 200 more in 2026.
- J. Crew closed 61 stores in 2017 and sporadically closed additional individual stores in the first quarter of 2018. On May 4, 2020, J. Crew announced its filing for Chapter 11 bankruptcy.
- Jenny Craig filed for Chapter 7 bankruptcy on May 5, 2023, and went out of business, closing all of its weight loss centers in the United States. Despite reassurances that its centers were unaffected, the chain's division in Australia and New Zealand was placed in voluntary administration four days later.
- Jo-Ann filed for bankruptcy on January 15, 2025, less than a year after filing previously and closing no stores. The arts and crafts chain revealed that while no closures were planned, it was $615 million in debt from declines or outright cessation of inventory production, putting it an "untenable position." It sought a sale of its assets, earning a stalking horse bid from Gordon Brothers Retail Partners, which recently bought a rough majority of Big Lots; it was predicted that unless Jo-Ann found a higher bidder, Gordon Brothers would purchase the brand and begin liquidating all of its stores. Despite its prior promise to not close any stores, Jo-Ann announced on February 12, 2025 that it would begin closing 500 of its approximately 800 stores immediately. Jo-Ann later announced the closure of all 800 stores after failing to find a buyer for the remainder of locations.
- Journeys closed 94 stores in fiscal year 2024 and targeted another 50 closures in fiscal year 2025. 15 more stores were closed by April 2026.

== K ==
- Kering, a French conglomerate that owns luxury brands Gucci, Yves Saint Laurent, Balenciaga, Bottega Veneta, Alexander McQueen, Creed, and Maui Jim, closed 133 locations worldwide in 2025, and scheduled an additional 100 store closures worldwide.
- Kenneth Cole Productions shut down its 63 outlet stores in 2016 to focus its efforts on its e-commerce site.
- Kiko Milano US filed for Chapter 11 bankruptcy on January 12, 2018, closing most of its stores in the United States.
- Kirkland's announced in June 2025 that it would close dozens of stores and rebrand a majority of them under the Bed Bath & Beyond Home name. 25 Kirkland's locations were later designated for closure after their leases expired; none would be reopened and rebranded. On June 17, 2026, it was announced that all Kirkland's locations would be rebranded into the new name of Bed Bath & Beyond Seasonal Living, though the stores, in all essence, would continue operating as normal Kirkland's locations.
- Kit and Ace closed all its stores in the US, UK, and Australia in April 2017, focusing on e-commerce and its 9 Canadian shops.
- Kohl's closed 18 stores in March 2016; the company did not plan to close more at the moment and only announced the shrinkage of future locations. On January 9, 2025, Kohl's announced the closure of 27 underperforming locations by April.
- Kroger announced in June 2025 its plans to close 60 stores over 18 months to improve efficiency.

== L ==
- Lammes Candies shut down all of its remaining retail locations in 2026.
- La Senza was the dominant lingerie retailer in Canada at its peak, with 322 domestic locations and 497 franchised international locations in January 2009 for a total of 819 locations. Facing fierce competition, the retailer suffered a great decline and the loss of its Canadian dominance. As of September 2020, La Senza has a total of 277 locations worldwide: 74 Canadian stores, one United States location, and 202 franchised international stores.
- Leslie's, the largest retailer of swimming pool supplies in the United States, filed for bankruptcy on September 30, 2026. It announced plans to close 76 stores.
- Liberated Brands, parent company of the brands Beachworks, Becker Surfboards, Billabong, Boardriders, Honolua Surf, Quiksilver, ROXY, RVCA, Spyder, and Volcom, announced plans to close all 122 store locations in February 2025.
- The Limited filed for bankruptcy in January 2017, went out of business, and closed its remaining 250 stores, but Sycamore Partners bought its IP.
- LifeWay Christian Resources, the publishing arm of the Southern Baptist Convention, announced that it would close all of its 170 LifeWay Christian Stores by the end of 2019 and shift its focus to its e-commerce business.
- L.L. Bean cut its call center hours from two shifts to one and eliminated an unspecified number of positions in 2024 in response to changing shopping habits.
- L'Occitane filed for Chapter 11 bankruptcy in January 2021 and announced the closure of 23 unprofitable stores in its US branch.
- Lord & Taylor announced on June 5, 2018, that it would close 10 stores throughout 2019, representing 1 in 5 of its store count. This comes after parent company Hudson's Bay announced plans to shutter the Fifth Avenue store in New York City after it sold the property to WeWork. On May 5, 2020, Lord & Taylor announced that it would liquidate all of its locations.
- Lowe's announced in August 2018 that it would be closing all Orchard Supply Hardware locations. In November 2018, Lowe's announced that it intended to close 51 stores in North America as part of a plan to improve profitability.
- Lucky's Market closed all but seven of its stores by February 12, 2020.
- Lumber Liquidators, previously LL Flooring, announced on August 12, 2024 that it intended to close 94 stores. Weeks later, the company announced that it would instead close all of its stores, but swiftly reversed course upon being saved last-minute by a sale to F9 Investments. F9 kept 219 locations and one distribution center open while closing the other 211 locations within twelve weeks.

== M ==
- Macy's announced plans in March 2017 to close at least 68 stores and eliminate more than 10,000 jobs. In January 2020, the chain announced that it would close 125 additional stores by the end of 2022. On February 27, 2024, Macy's announced that it would be shuttering 150 locations by 2026, roughly 30% of its total store amount, to focus on small-format stores and an expansion of both Bloomingdale's and Bluemercury. 50 locations were initially set to close in 2024 alone, and the iconic flagship location in San Francisco's Union Square was designated for closure in 2025. The moves came as the company tried to fend off an acquisition from activist investors aiming to take it private. Near the end of the fiscal year, Macy's increased the closure amount from 50 to 65 stores after a weak quarterly sales report. The next round of closures, a total of 14 stores, was announced on January 9, 2026.
- Marsh Supermarkets announced on May 11, 2017, that it was filing for Chapter 11 bankruptcy protection and that if it did not find a seller in 60 days, it would close its remaining 44 locations. Marsh eventually found buyers for 26 of its 44 stores. The remaining 18 were to be liquidated and closed, and some of the other 26 would also be liquidated, as only the buildings were purchased, but not the stores' stocks of inventory. The remaining locations were purchased by Kroger and Fresh Encounter and have since been shuttered and rebranded.
- Mattress Firm filed for Chapter 11 bankruptcy on October 5, 2018. The company planned to close up to 700 of its over 3,200 company-owned stores, primarily in markets with multiple locations in close proximity to one another. Among the planned closures, at least 200 stores were slated for immediate closure. The company stated that it would not conduct liquidation sales for the affected locations, instead sending inventory to remaining stores, warehouses, or distribution centers. The company emerged from bankruptcy in November.
- Max Brenner US filed for Chapter 11 bankruptcy on February 10, 2026. The company's Australian arm had entered voluntary administration in 2018 and closed 20 of its 37 locations.
- MC Sports closed all stores in 2017 as a result of bankruptcy.
- Michael Kors announced in 2017 that it would close 100 to 125 of its standalone stores over the next two years.
- Microsoft announced on June 26, 2020 that the company would permanently close all but four of its 83 physical retail stores and focus on their e-commerce operations. All of the stores had been closed since March due to the COVID-19 pandemic. The four remaining locations, in New York City, London, Sydney, and Redmond, Washington, would be revamped as "Experience Centers".
- Mitchell Gold + Bob Williams announced the shuttering of all of its furniture stores on August 29, 2023, following a sharp decline in sales and trouble gaining financing.
- Modell's filed for Chapter 11 bankruptcy in March 2020 and announced plans to liquidate all of its stores.
- Morphe Cosmetics abruptly shuttered all of its US locations on January 5, 2023, after facing years of financial losses, empty shelves, and controversies via its partnerships with YouTube influencers such as James Charles and Jeffree Star. Employees had flocked to social media days prior to call out the company's lack of transparency over layoffs and dwindling inventory, leading to speculation about the chain's future. A few days later, Morphe's parent company, Forma Brands, would end up filing for Chapter 11 bankruptcy.
- Movie Gallery announced on April 30, 2010 that all of its US Hollywood Video, Movie Gallery, and Game Crazy stores would close. Movie Gallery’s Canadian stores also entered liquidation on June 8, 2010.
- Multiply announced on May 31, 2013, that it would close its operations. It announced that it planned to continue its business as an archive photo and video site with its new mobile app.

== N ==
- National Stores filed for Chapter 11 bankruptcy protection in August 2018 with plans to close 74 of its 344 stores under a reorganization plan. The liquidation sales expanded to 184 Fallas and Factory 2-U stores starting in October 2018.
- Neiman Marcus announced plans in September 2017 to close 25% of its Last Call outlet stores and would later shutter all but five of its Last Call stores in 2020. On April 19, 2020, Neiman Marcus announced that it would file for bankruptcy. The luxury chain filed for Chapter 11 bankruptcy in the Southern Court of Texas in May 2020. On January 29, 2026, it was announced that the final five Last Call locations would be shuttered amidst the bankruptcy proceedings of Neiman Marcus' new parent company, Saks Global.
- New York & Company shuttered all of its stores by late summer 2020 as a result of its parent company, RTW Retailwinds, filing for bankruptcy. In October 2020, its remaining assets were sold to New York investment company Saadia Group.
- Nike, Inc. announced plans to shift towards e-commerce and decrease its retail partners from 30,000 to 40. However, this ended up hurting Nike in the long run and resulted in the company closing stores and its fitness studios, in addition to laying off 1,400 employees. Nike closed 11 stores in 10 US states in July 2026 as part of the Global Operations Changes announced in April 2026.
- Nine West filed for bankruptcy on April 6, 2018. It closed all 70 of its retail stores, shifting to online only.
- Nordstrom was unable to go private in 2017 due to the retail apocalypse. On May 4, 2020, Nordstrom announced that it would shutter sixteen locations. On March 3, 2023, Nordstrom announced that it would close all of its Canadian full-line and Nordstrom Rack stores by June 13, 2023.

== O ==
- Office Depot has closed over 1,000 locations since merging with OfficeMax in 2013, leaving the chain with around 800 remaining locations, an amount that is actively dwindling by the year.
- Olympia Sports announced the closure of all of its remaining stores in late July 2022. It had 35 stores at the time of the announcement, down from 225 at its peak.
- Omaha Steaks shuttered its restaurant distribution operations and laid off 30 employees in February 2026.
- Orvis announced plans to close 31 locations and five outlet stores by early 2026.

== P ==
- Papyrus closed all its stores in 2020 after its parent company, Schurman Retail Group, filed for bankruptcy protection.
- Party City closed 45 of its 870 stores in 2019, up from its usual 10 to 15 closures each year. On January 18, 2023, Party City filed for Chapter 11 bankruptcy, and a month afterward, announced the closure of 22 stores. An additional 9 stores were added to the closing list in April as well as 4 more locations in May. In September 2023, Party City exited bankruptcy with a billion reduced in debt. Over a year later, reports emerged that Party City was struggling to maintain operations and actively mulling over a second bankruptcy filing, and liquidation of its stores. On December 20, 2024, the chain officially announced that it would shut down operations and begin liquidating its 700 remaining stores.
- Payless ShoeSource filed for bankruptcy in April 2017 and closed 400 of its stores. It emerged from bankruptcy in August, but announced on February 14, 2019, that it was filing for bankruptcy again and that it would close all of its stores and its online operation in the United States.
- Petco closed 25 stores each in 2024 and 2025. An additional 30 stores were planned for closure in September 2025.
- Pier 1 Imports announced the closure of 450 out of its 942 locations in January 2020. It had initially only been expected to close approximately 70 stores. On February 17, the company filed for Chapter 11 bankruptcy and announced that it would be liquidating and closing all of its 67 Canadian stores; the company would later announce the closure of all of its 540 stores in May 2020 due to the COVID-19 pandemic.

== R ==
- RadioShack filed for bankruptcy in March 2017 and planned to close 552 stores. This was the company's second bankruptcy filing in two years. A few months later, RadioShack announced the closure of 1,000 stores, leaving only 70 original locations open, not counting those doing business under the REV program.
- Ralph Lauren closed its five-story New York City flagship store on Fifth Avenue in April 2017.
- Redbox's parent company, Chicken Soup for the Soul, filed for bankruptcy on June 29, 2024, and shut down Redbox's online presence and kiosks. Some kiosks were reported to be still working as of October 2024.
- REI announced that it would close its flagship store in SoHo, NYC, and two other locations in Boston and Paramus, New Jersey in 2026. Earlier in 2025, the company laid off 400 employees and ended its REI Experience classes, day tours, and adventure tourism packages.
- Revlon filed for Chapter 11 bankruptcy protection in mid-June 2022 following its attempt at preservation by obtaining a loan from Citigroup in 2018. Subsequently, the bank mistakenly wired $900M, rather than the intended $8M, for interest payments to Revlon's lenders; less than half of the wired sum had been recovered when Revlon filed for bankruptcy in mid-2022, stalling the company's reorganization plans. Revlon emerged from bankruptcy in May 2023.
- Rite Aid was reported by multiple news outlets to be considering Chapter 11 bankruptcy in September 2023; the pharmacy chain was said to have been petitioning for closures of up to 400 or 500 stores. On October 15, 2023, Rite Aid officially filed for Chapter 11 bankruptcy, announcing plans to close nearly 100 stores. In late 2023, Rite Aid announced the closure of 53 more locations. Going into 2024, Rite Aid announced that it would close an additional 77 locations. 53 more stores were added to the closing list in April 2024. Additional closures continued, nearly fully eradicating the pharmacy's presence in Michigan and Ohio. In September 2024, Rite Aid emerged from bankruptcy as a privately owned company. In April 2025, Rite Aid was reported to be considering a second bankruptcy filing after failing to return to profitability. In May 2025, Rite Aid filed for bankruptcy a second time and announced plans to close all remaining stores.
- Rockport filed for bankruptcy in May 2018. The company that bought the company out of bankruptcy closed all 60 of its brick-and-mortar stores in July of that year.
- The Room Store filed for bankruptcy on December 12, 2011. Throughout 2012, all Room Store locations, except those in Arizona, which included Texas and the eastern and southern United States, were closed. The Phoenix-area stores (which were owned by The RoomStores of Phoenix, LLC), the last remains of the chain, were closed in 2016.
- rue21 announced plans to close around 400 stores in April 2017. The company filed for Chapter 11 bankruptcy on May 16, 2017, and emerged from bankruptcy in September. On May 2, 2024, rue21 collapsed back into bankruptcy, its second filing since 2017 and third overall, and announced that all 540 of its remaining stores would be shuttered within four to six weeks.

== S ==
- Saks Global, the parent company of Saks Fifth Avenue, Bergdorf Goodman, and Neiman Marcus, filed for bankruptcy on January 13, 2026, after accruing heavy amounts of debt from the creation of the company through Hudson's Bay Company's acquisition of the Neiman Marcus Group in 2024. No store closures were planned upon filing for bankruptcy, and the company promised it would pay off its suppliers and employees. However, on January 29, 2026, Saks Global announced that all but 12 Saks Off 5th locations, as well as Off 5th's e-commerce operations, would be shuttering permamently. In addition, the last five Neiman Marcus Last Call stores, which previously survived Neiman Marcus' 2020 bankruptcy filing, were also announced to be closing. On February 10, 2026, it was announced that eight Saks Fifth Avenue stores and the Neiman Marcus location in Boston, Massachusetts would be closing; Saks also announced the imminent shutdown of all but two Saks Fifth Avenue club shopping services and the consolidation of Horchow.com into Neiman Marcus' e-commerce site. Saks announced yet another round of closures on March 6, 2026, consisting of 12 Saks Fifth Avenue stores and 3 Neiman Marcus locations. On June 26, 2026, Saks Global emerged from bankruptcy with a 75% reduction in debt and $500 million in financing, now naming itself Exemplar Luxury Group.
- Sally Beauty announced the closure of 350 locations in November 2022, with closings expected to be completed by the following month.
- Sam Ash Music, a musical instrument retailer, announced in March 2024 that it would close 18 of its stores. It later announced in May 2024 that it would close all 42 locations by the end of July 2024. Competition from online shopping was blamed as a reason for the closures.
- Sam's Club, a subsidiary of Walmart, closed 63 stores in 2018. Twelve of the 63 locations were expected to be converted into fulfillment centers. Sam's Club locations in the United States decreased to 597.
- Sears Holdings, the parent company of Sears and Kmart, announced plans to close approximately 150 Sears and Kmart stores in 2017. The retailer, as part of required reporting, stated to the Securities and Exchange Commission that it had substantial doubt that any of its stores could continue to survive. Such a report is typically considered damaging to a company, as it affects their supply line. On April 20, 2017, Business Insider reported that the company was "quietly closing" more stores than it had initially announced and compiled a list of ten additional Sears and Kmart locations that were closing. On April 22, Sears also announced plans to close 50 of its auto centers and 92 pharmacies within Kmart locations. Further closures were then announced: on June 6, 2017, 72 Sears stores, on June 23, 18 Sears and 2 Kmart stores, with more to come per the CEO's blog post. The Canadian subsidiary, Sears Canada, successfully petitioned the courts on October 13, 2017, to allow it to close down the entire organization, including 130 stores, and liquidate all its assets by January 21, 2018, terminating around 12,000 positions. As such, all stores were closed on January 14, 2018. In January 2018, the company announced 103 more stores by the end of April, of which 39 were Sears and 64 Kmart. The company filed for Chapter 11 bankruptcy on October 15, 2018. On February 8, 2019, Eddie Lampert announced that his $5.2 billion bid for Sears to survive succeeded, which would result in at least 400 stores remaining open. However, Sears subsequently announced the closure of 96 more stores in late 2019. The company's headquarters were divested in 2022. Further dismantling of the Sears and Kmart store network continued in the subsequent years, and as of 2026, only five Sears stores and one Kmart store remain in the continental United States.
- Sharper Image closed all 183 of its stores and laid off 4,000 employees in 2008, but was resurrected as an online and catalog business in 2010.
- Shoe City filed for bankruptcy on March 31, 2023, and closed all 39 locations in Maryland, Virginia, and Washington D.C. soon afterwards.
- ShopHQ, a Minnesota-based home shopping television network, ceased broadcasting on April 17, 2025, and laid off 200 employees over a 14-day period starting June 16, 2025.
- Shopko filed for bankruptcy on January 16, 2019, and planned to close 250 of its more than 360 stores. However, on March 18, 2019, Shopko announced the closure of all remaining stores due to a buyer not being found for the chain. Liquidation sales ended by June 2019.
- Signet Jewelers, which owns prominent jeweler brands Kay, Zales, and Jared, announced the closure of 400 stores in June 2020. In March 2026, Signet announced plans to close 100 additional locations and shut down the James Allen and Rocksbox brands.
- Soft Surroundings filed for Chapter 11 bankruptcy on September 11, 2023, announcing plans to close all 44 of its stores and sell its online and catalog business to Coldwater Creek.
- Southeastern Grocers, owner of BI-LO, Harveys, Winn-Dixie, and Fresco y Más, filed for Chapter 11 bankruptcy on March 15, 2018. It closed down 94 out of 528 of its stores, many of which having related leases rejected and lease rejection claims rendered unimpaired. Southeastern Grocers emerged from bankruptcy in June 2018. The BI-LO brand would eventually cease operation in 2021 with all of its stores sold, rebranded, or outright closed. In August 2023, Aldi announced its intentions to acquire SEG's holdings under the Winn-Dixie and Harveys banners, with the sale being closed on March 7, 2024; Fresco y Más was spun off as a separate company under Fresco Retail Group LLC. In February 2025, Aldi agreed to sell 170 Winn-Dixie and Harveys stores back to Southeastern Grocers with backing from C&S Wholesale Grocers; SEG will continue to operate the remaining 220 Winn-Dixie and Harveys locations until their conversion to the Aldi brand is completed by 2027.
- Sports Authority filed for Chapter 11 bankruptcy on March 2, 2016. The company's stores were sold to a group of liquidators, and its CEO announced that all stores would close by the end of August 2016.
- Stein Mart filed for Chapter 11 bankruptcy in August 2020 with intent to close all of its locations due to the COVID-19 pandemic.
- Stop & Shop closed 32 stores in 2024, announcing plans in 2026 to close four more underperforming locations in an effort to update its business model.
- Sur La Table filed for Chapter 11 bankruptcy in July 2020. It was subsequently acquired by Marquee Brands and CSC Generation.

== T ==
- Tailored Brands, the owners of men's fashion retailers Men's Wearhouse, Jos. A. Bank, and K&G, filed for bankruptcy in August 2020 and closed 500 of its stores. It emerged from bankruptcy in late 2020.
- Tapestry, Inc., owner of luxury brands Coach and Kate Spade, closed 64 stores in 2026.
- Target Canada, the Canadian subsidiary of the Target Corporation, announced on January 15, 2015, that it would close all 133 stores in Canada by April 12, 2015.
- Teavana announced plans in 2017 to close all 379 of its stores by 2018, with parent company Starbucks citing lower mall traffic, and on August 29, 2017, Simon Property Group sued Starbucks over the Teavana closures.
- Things Remembered closed all of its remaining 176 stores and its headquarters in Richmond Heights, Ohio, in January 2023, moving to become an online-only gift retailer. The chain had previously filed for bankruptcy in 2019 and closed over 224 stores in the years following.
- TigerDirect, an electronics retailer, closed all but three of its physical locations in March 2015 to focus on e-commerce and B2B sales. The three remaining stores were closed later that year following the sale of the company to PCM Inc.. The TigerDirect website was retired on March 31, 2023, ending the company's online presence after 25 years.
- Tillys was reported to have quietly closed 40 stores in 2026.
- Tops Friendly Markets filed for Chapter 11 bankruptcy on February 21, 2018, with over $1.18 billion in liabilities. The company announced on August 30, 2018 that it would close ten stores. The chain emerged from bankruptcy in November and announced its merger with Price Chopper Supermarkets in February 2021, a move made because it had fallen well behind its rival Wegmans.
- Torrid announced the closure of 180 stores in June 2025, amounting the decision to an uptick in online sales and the expiration of store leases. In March 2026, it was reported that Torrid would shut around a third of its stores and planned to close 30 locations during the first half of the year.
- Town Shoes, owned by DSW, announced on August 29, 2018 that all of its stores in Canada would close. The stores shut down by early 2019.
- Toys "R" Us filed for Chapter 11 bankruptcy in September 2017 with over $5 billion in debt. It announced that its Canadian subsidiary would seek bankruptcy protection in parallel proceedings. On January 24, 2018, the retailer announced plans to close a total of 180 of its Toys "R" Us and Babies "R" Us locations in the United States, approximately 20% of its U.S. store base, pending court approval. At least half of the closures would come from Babies "R" Us locations. In addition to closures, the retailer planned to quickly revamp a dozen locations to better co-brand the baby and toy experience with more revamps coming, as well as cutting the number of items offered in existing stores, revamping the loyalty program and pricing model to be more competitive, and promoting the baby registry business to generate more sales of higher-priced items. In February 2018, Toys "R" Us announced that it would close 200 more stores. On March 8, 2018, Bloomberg News reported that Toys "R" Us was considering closing United States operations entirely. On March 14, 2018, the retailer announced it was shutting down all 100 of its locations in the United Kingdom, resulting in the loss of 3,000 positions. Later the same day, it was announced that all US locations would be sold or closed, affecting as many as 33,000 jobs. Billionaire Isaac Larian of toy manufacturer MGA Entertainment, along with other investors, pledged $200 million to salvage up to 400 stores, but regardless, liquidation sales at all Toys "R" Us and Babies "R" Us began on March 23, 2018. All of the remaining stores closed permanently on June 29, 2018. Toys "R" Us' Canadian stores remained open. In late 2018, the brand name was pulled out of bankruptcy protection; plans were made for it to return in the form of specialty stores under the name "Geoffrey's Toy Box." Tru Kids acquired the Toys "R" Us and Babies "R" Us brands in February 2019. Toys "R" Us reopened under this new management in 2019 with stores in New Jersey and Texas. Both locations closed in 2021, citing the COVID-19 pandemic and wanting to find new locations with better traffic. In December 2021, a new flagship Toys "R" Us store opened at American Dream Meadowlands in East Rutherford, New Jersey. In late September 2023, Toys "R" Us announced a brick-and-mortar comeback, planning to open 24 new flagship stores.
- Tractor Supply announced plans to close 75 Petsense stores in July 2026.
- True Religion announced the closure of 27 stores on July 12, 2017, as a result of Chapter 11 bankruptcy. True Religion emerged from bankruptcy in October 2020.
- True Value declared bankruptcy on October 14, 2024. The hardware chain sold itself to rival Do it Best and ensured that none of its stores would be closing amidst bankruptcy proceedings.
- Tuesday Morning filed for Chapter 11 bankruptcy on May 27, 2020, and planned to close 230 underperforming stores out of 687. On February 14, 2023, Tuesday Morning filed for Chapter 11 bankruptcy again and announced the closure of 265 stores to focus on better-performing stores in other markets. Two months later, on April 27, 2023, Tuesday Morning announced that it had been purchased by a liquidator and would go out of business entirely, closing the nearly two hundred stores it had left.

== U ==
- Ulta Beauty closed 600 "shop-in-shop" locations inside Target department stores following the termination of a partnership in August 2026.
- Under Armour has closed more than 50 stores due to slowing sales.
- Urban Outfitters, along with Anthropologie and Free People, closed seven stores despite opening 19 stores for fiscal 2018, as "shoppers don't like their clothing" according to MarketWatch.

== V ==
- Vanity, a mall clothing store based in Fargo, North Dakota, closed all of its stores by April 2017.
- Vera Bradley closed some stores in 2018 and 2026.
- Verizon announced in November 2025 that it planned to convert 179 stores from corporate to franchise-owned and to close one store. Additionally, it announced layoffs of 13,000 employees.
- Victoria's Secret announced a closure of 333 stores: 30 in 2018, 53 in 2019, and 250 in 2020, up from the previous average of 15 per year. These combined closures amount to about 29% of the brand's stores. The parent company divested itself of La Senza in January 2019, which was further affected by the retail apocalypse.
- Vitamin World, a retailer of vitamins and health supplements, filed for Chapter 11 bankruptcy on September 12, 2017. The company planned to close 51 stores out of 334 total; 45 stores had already been closed since 2016. It was sold to Feihe International, Inc. in 2018.

== W ==
- The Walking Company filed for Chapter 11 bankruptcy on March 8, 2018, with over $40 million in outstanding loans and $11.7 million in bond obligations. It emerged from bankruptcy in July.
- Walgreens announced plans to close 200 stores in 2019. In June 2024, Walgreens announced plans to close up to a quarter of its remaining 8,600 stores.
- Warehouse One, a Canadian denim and apparel retailer, announced plans to liquidate all 128 locations of Warehouse One and Bootlegger brand stores on May 8, 2026.
- West Marine, the largest boating retailer by sales in the United States, filed for Chapter 11 bankruptcy in May 2026. It announced on June 15, 2026, that it would close 59 stores. Another 32 stores were soon added to the closing list, axing West Marine's total store count to half of what it once was.
- Wet Seal filed for its second bankruptcy in January 2017 and announced plans to close all its stores, which numbered 171 at the time.
- Wren Kitchens closed all 15 of its US stores in April 2026.

== Y ==
- Yankee Candle announced on December 4, 2025 that it would close up to 20 of its stores by January 2026.

== Z ==
- Z Gallerie announced in 2019 that it would be closing stores across the US. Its assets were acquired by DirectBuy at a bankruptcy auction in 2019. On October 18, 2023, Z Gallerie filed for Chapter 11 bankruptcy for the third time in company history, its first proceedings since 2019; it was reported that the furniture chain would completely shutter its 21 remaining stores if it failed to find a buyer before the end of the year. With no buyer found after a week, Z Gallerie proceeded to kick off liquidation sales at the remaining 21 locations.
- Zellers, once a widespread and popular Canadian department store chain, sold its retail leases to Target Canada, which, by 2013, shuttered its Canadian stores. The last two remaining Zellers stores closed on January 26, 2020.
- Zumiez announced that it would close 26 stores in March 2026.

== See also ==
- List of Canadian retail closures (21st century)
