= Rebate (marketing) =

Buying discount scheme

In marketing, a rebate is a form of buying discount and is an amount paid by way of reduction, return, or refund that is paid retrospectively. It is a type of sales promotion that marketers use primarily as incentives or supplements to product sales. Rebates are also used as a means of enticing price-sensitive consumers into purchasing a product. The mail-in rebate (MIR) is the most common. An MIR entitles the buyer to mail in a coupon, receipt, and barcode in order to receive a check for a particular amount, depending on the particular product, time, and often place of purchase.

Rebates are offered by either the retailer or the product manufacturer. Large stores often work in conjunction with manufacturers, usually requiring two or sometimes three separate rebates for each item, and sometimes are valid only at a single store. Rebate forms and special receipts are sometimes printed by the cash register at time of purchase on a separate receipt or available online for download. In some cases, the rebate may be available immediately, in which case it is referred to as an instant rebate. Some rebate programs offer several payout options to consumers, including a paper check, a prepaid card that can be spent immediately without a trip to the bank, or even as a PayPal payout.

== Rationale ==
=== Benefits for companies ===
Rebates have become popular in retail sales within the United States. Retailers and manufacturers have many reasons to offer them:

- Rebates are heavily used for advertising sales in retail stores, and can be especially appealing to price-sensitive consumers by increasing their willingness to pay. For example, an item might be advertised as "$39 after rebate" with the item costing $79 out-the-door with a $40 rebate that the customer would need to redeem.
- Rebates can be used by retailers to gain market share, by persuading more consumers to purchase their products and services over those of a rival company. This increases one firm's profits while decreasing others' profits.
- Sometimes discounts are given at the point of sale rather than the manufacturer providing rebates, eliminating the need for coupons or mail-in rebates. However, rebates are sometimes given in the form of "cashback offers" for mobile phone contracts or other high value retail items sold alongside a credit agreement.
- The information given in the rebate form, such as name, address, method of payment, can be used for data mining studies of consumer behavior.
- The information can be used as evidence of a pre-existing business relationship for marketing purposes, such as do not call lists.
- Customers tend to notice price increases and react negatively. Rebates offer retailers the benefit of giving customers a temporary discount on an item, to stimulate sales, while allowing it to maintain its current price point. This method avoids the negative backlash that could be perceived with a price being lowered and then raised later.
- Rebates also allow companies to "price protect" certain product lines by being selective in which models or brands to be discounted. This allows retailers and manufacturers to move some product at lower cost while maintaining prices of successful models. A straight price reduction on some models would have a domino effect on all products in a line.
- During the turnaround time, the company can earn interest on the money.
- If the turnaround time crosses into the next fiscal year or quarter, a rebate offer can inflate sales in the current period, and not have to be accounted for until the next period and then it could be attributed as a cost reducing sales or expense for the next period, giving companies an accounting advantage with their Wall Street projections.
- Can be profitable for businesses who offer rebates as customers may void their chance of receiving a rebate. Companies often require the original UPC barcode, receipt, and additional information, which a buyer may forget to include when redeeming the rebate. Companies almost always add other caveats to the rebate as well, such as the redemption having to be postmarked by a certain date. Rebate mail may also look like junk mail (either deliberately or by coincidence), and so the customer may overlook it. It works in the company's favor if buyers do not act quickly to redeem. However, a University of Florida study notes that shorter redemption periods actually increase the redemption rate in the consumer's favor because it gives them less time for procrastination to set in.
- New companies that want to make a break into a market can offer substantial rebate savings on their new product as a means of capturing a customer's attention. Zeus Kerravala, vice president at the Yankee Group, has said, "For companies that haven't been in a particular market, the rebate that essentially refunds the customer's money is a great way to get people to pay attention to them. This is especially true in consumer electronics, where brand name does matter. It's a good way to get customers to take a chance on a new brand."
- Consumers that are more price-sensitive will be more enticed to purchase products with rebates.
- Increased sales through offering rebate programs can increase brand loyalty between manufacturers and retailers.
- Retailers and manufacturers can use rebates as a way of gaining market share over rival companies, by increasing the amount of customers due to lower perceived prices.
- Rebates can offer price protection against pricing controls, retaining full list prices at the maximum allowed price ceiling or minimum allowed price floor while using rebates to comply with controls exerted by government or distribution channels.
- Some customers are likely to forget about the rebate.

=== Benefits for consumers ===
Rebates may offer customers lower pricing. Deal hunter sites frequently tout the benefits of rebates in making technology affordable: "Rebates are the meat and potatoes of the ultimate tech deal, no matter what you are buying… They are paying you money to buy their stuff. All you have to do is take it."

According to 2011 research, 47% of consumers submitted a rebate in the past 12 months, whereas similar research conducted in 2009 showed that only 37 percent of consumers had submitted a rebate in the prior year.

Industry advisers claim that if mail-in rebates go away, they will not be replaced by "instant rebates" of the same value amount because of the loss of the tangible benefits listed above (fiscal accounting, price protection, etc.) Steve Baker, vice president of industry analysis for NPD Group, comments that "It's a case of be careful of what you ask for. You may see some great deals go away."

If the consumer is more concerned with the price than his or her time for any reason, or if the consumer's income and budget are extremely limited or non-existent, the rebate may be seen as a good deal. Price-sensitive consumers have a higher willingness to pay when there are perceived discounts.

== Drawbacks for consumers ==
=== Opportunity costs ===
Rebates take a certain amount of time and effort from the consumer – figuring out the rules, filling out the forms, preparing and dropping off the mailing, cashing in the check, all whilst keeping track of the paperwork in the process. Thus, a rebate can be thought of as being paid to do this paperwork and provide one's personal data to the company. Chances of rebate mailing being lost or failing some criteria may further reduce the expected return on this effort.

Consumers who are aware of this, and who value their time (time-sensitive consumers), effort, and opportunity costs above the value of the rebate may choose to intentionally ignore a non-instant rebate that requires such procedures and assume the out-the-door price when considering the purchase.

Another potential disadvantage to receiving a rebate is that the rebate does not refund any of the sales tax charged at the time of purchase. Thus the consumer will pay more in tax than if the price had simply been lowered at the time of purchase.

=== Price discrimination ===
A common complaint against rebates is the claim that rebates can be used as a form of "price discrimination" against members of lower classes who are less likely to redeem rebates than a more educated middle class. Sridhar Moorthy, marketing professor at the University of Toronto also advocates a "price discrimination" theory between "people who are price-sensitive and people who are not price-sensitive". A different view, as taken by the BusinessWeek article, is that rebates can be viewed as a "tax on the disorganized" that is paid by those who do not submit their rebates as opposed to those who do. As mentioned above, rebates are also less enticing the more the consumer values the opportunity costs (time and effort) involved in rebate submission.

Furthermore, rebates have been described as a means to increase the regular selling price of a product, as they can increase a consumer's willingness to pay at the time of sale, due to the perceived savings.

=== Perceived quality ===
Rebates have also been seen to have negative effects on the sales of products and services, having the potential to decrease a consumer's perceived quality of a product. From a study in 2009, collected data indicated that there was no increase in a consumer's willingness to pay for a product or service when there was a rebate available. However, the data found that consumer's perception of the quality of the product or service decreased when a rebate was on offer.

=== Consumer complaints ===
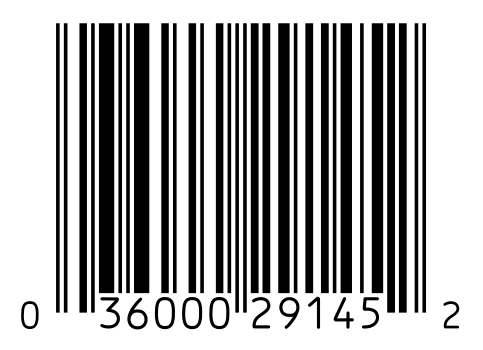
Typical UPC barcode required for rebate submission

Dell has been the subject of rebate complaints for the confusing nature of their rebate programs, and as such changed its marketing to reduce the number of rebates offered. Rebate issues began to clog Dell's customer service forums, leading the company to shut down that portion of the website. CompUSA used rebates regularly until it started closing its remaining stores in December 2007.

Intel, a leading microprocessor manufacturer, received a $1.71 billion fine for offering illegal rebates to manufacturers of computers that bought Intel's processors over those from rival companies.

Cell phone service companies, including major players like T-Mobile, as well as third-party retailers like Radio Shack, Wirefly and others have received growing attention due to complex rebate redemption rules. Both carriers and retailers make customers submit rebate claims during a 30-day window, often 6 months after cell phone activation. Some authorized dealers have responded by trying to make rebate requirements more transparent, explaining that the carrier will withdraw payment from them if a customer quits service before the end of the contract.

In 2009, Florida State Attorney General Bill McCollum filed suit against TigerDirect, OnRebate, and TigerDirect's parent company Systemax, charging the companies with failing to provide rebates to customers.

== Regulations and laws ==
Rebates offered must be in accordance with the laws and regulations of the area they are offered in. The Federal Trade Commission (FTC) operates within the United States, and acts to protect consumers. One law that the FTC has set is to ensure that companies provide the rebate in the time they specified. The FTC also specifies all relevant conditions that a consumer should know are clearly specified – including fees and deadlines. Furthermore, regulations pertaining to specific forms of advertising are in place. For example, television advertisement cannot include text that is deliberately hard to read, either through disappearing before it can be read or being too small to read.

In the United States, Connecticut state regulations section 42-110b-19(e) require retailers who advertise the net price of an item after rebate to pay consumers the amount of that rebate at time of purchase. Rhode Island has similar legislation (Gen. Laws 6-13.1-1). Otherwise, the after-rebate price cannot be advertised as the final price to be paid by the consumer. For example, retailers in Connecticut can advertise only "$40 with a $40 rebate," not "Free After Rebate," unless they give the rebate at the time of purchase.

== Types of rebates ==
=== Instant rebate ===
An instant rebate, or sometimes instant savings, is a marketing strategy or gimmick in which a product is either advertised at a specific price, or at a discounted price, where the discount is applied at the time of purchase. For example, the store may advertise a widget for $9.99, but with a $5 instant rebate, the price is $4.99. Or the product may be advertised as $4.99 with a $5 instant rebate.

Instant rebates are processed at the time of sale, and so the rebate is provided immediately upon purchase.

We can see instant rebate as a discount on a product. In accounting strategy the actual invoice will be less by the amount of the instant rebate that is given to the customer. Then:

$$\text{invoice cost} = \text{product cost} - \text{instant rebate amount}$$.

=== Mail-in rebate ===
Mail-in rebates are the most common form of rebate and differ from instant rebates in that they require action from the consumer for the rebate to be made. Consumers will need to provide any information that is required for the rebate, which often includes their phone number, name, postal address and a receipt (or proof of purchase). Mail-in rebates have a deadline for when the rebate must be sent or received by. Often this deadline is 30 days after the purchase, and generally, a rebate is received within 12 weeks.

A check will then be mailed back by either the manufacturer of the product, or the company responsible for processing the manufacturer's rebates.

== Redemption rate ==
Not all buyers remember to mail the coupons, a phenomenon known in the industry as breakage, or the shoebox effect. Though it can be used interchangeably with breakage, slippage is the phenomenon when a consumer has his or her rebate fulfilled, but he or she loses or forgets to cash the check. Some rebate companies could tout a higher "redemption rate" including the breakage, while not calculating the potential slippage of uncashed checks.

Although rebates are offered by manufacturers, most rebates are handled under contract by rebate clearinghouses that specialize in processing rebates and contest applications. It is difficult to get an account of redemption rates from most rebate companies, partly due to a reluctance on the part of rebate fulfillment houses to release confidential business information. Among different sources, radically different numbers on both ends of the spectrum can be cited. Part of the reason is that most "redemption rates" do not distinguish whether they are calculated as part of total sales or incremental sales.

=== Some redemption estimates ===
- PMA, a marketing firm, estimated that in 2005, $486.5 million worth of rebates were redeemed. The redemption rates averaged 21.1% when calculated as a percentage of total sales, and 67.6% when calculated as a percentage of incremental sales. PMA notes, "These statistics reveal that redemption rates calculated as a percentage of total sales can be misleading when diluted by non-incremental sales, consequently making redemption rates appear lower than they truly are."
- In November 2005, BusinessWeek estimated a return rate of 60 percent. Some estimates have been as low as 2%. For example, nearly half of the 100,000 new TiVo subscribers in 2005 did not redeem their $100 rebates, allowing the company to keep $5,000,000 in additional profit.
- PC Data in the Reston, VA estimates between "10 and 30 percent".
- PlusNetMarketing in Wilmington, DE quotes 80%.
- A representative in 2005 from The Marco Corporation stated, "In some cases, we do have redemption programs that go as high as forty to fifty per cent, but generally it's about one to five per cent". In the same article, John Challinor, advertising manager for Sony Canada remarks, "The industry average is less than ten percent.... and it can be as low as one percent."
- NPD Group, a marketing firm, estimates 50% to 70%.

== Recent trends ==
Some retailers have taken a step forward with offering consumers new ways to submit their rebates easily over the Internet, completely or partially removing any mail-in requirements. Staples, Sears, TigerDirect, and Rite Aid currently offer an online submission option for all or some of the rebates they offer. These special rebates are usually identified as such and have instructions for full or partial online submissions. This is touted as a more accurate processing of the rebate, reducing the potential for human or mechanical error and, in many cases, eliminating the postage costs associated with traditional mail-in rebates, although some require the UPC or proof of purchase to be mailed in. Most of these retailers still let consumers submit rebates by mail.

In 2006, OfficeMax stores announced that they were eliminating mail-in rebates from their sales promotion in favor of instant rebates for their sale prices. The decision came after a year of working with rebate vendors and manufacturers to improve the rebate process and receiving "overwhelmingly negative feedback" from their customers about their rebate program.

Instead of checks, prepaid gift cards are being given by many stores. Merchants like these cards, as they cannot be redeemed for cash and must be spent. However, some states require that retailers redeem the card value for cash if it falls below a certain level, such as $5 in Washington state. Many sales people are not aware of this and will deny giving the refund. Consumers must be careful of expiration dates and read the fine print.

The typical American household that takes advantage of consumer rebates saves an average of $150 annually. More than $8 billion was issued back to American households in 2011 alone by rebate programs.

Cashback websites are third-party websites that allow consumers to purchase items from various e-shops through affiliate links. These cashback websites receive a commission from the e-shop and share a proportion of their commission with the consumer as a rebate. Cashback websites are gaining popularity as consumers can save money through using such websites. For example, in 2013, a cashback website paid around $41.6 million in rebates.
