= Longthornton =

Longthornton may refer to:

- Longthornton (ward)
- Longthornton and Tamworth Residents Association

== See also ==
- Longhorn
