= Hand Technologies =

Defunct computer company

- Type: Private
- Founded: 1996
- Defunct: 2001
- Headquarters: Austin, Texas, US
- Key people: Andrew Harris (CEO); Martin Slagter (President)
- Number of employees: 3,500 (1998)

Hand Technologies, Inc was a full-service computer and web services company. The company provided free delivery and set-up and customers get a one-stop shop for Internet services, training and support on all of Hand's products. Services were provided in Winchester and the company sold products from IBM, Hewlett-Packard and Lexmark International.

== History ==
The company was founded as Habitech in 1996 by Andrew Harris, Martin Slagter two former executives from Dell Computer and CompUSA.

Before founding the company the two tested the door-to-door selling concept for computers in Britain. Previously, Harris spent five years building the international operations of Dell. He left Dell in 1992 after losing a bid for a more senior position, and Slagter, who was leading Dell's business in Europe, followed him to Austin, which is also Dell's headquarters.

In May 1997, the company raised $6.75 million through a private securities offering and added seven board members, one of whom was Doug Martin, a former president of Tupperware North America.

In July 2001, the company went out of business, blaming an inability to raise money.
