= Z Gallerie =

Retail store chain in the United States

- Company type: Subsidiary
- Industry: Retail
- Founded: 1979; 47 years ago in Sherman Oaks, California
- Founders: Joe Zeiden; Mike Zeiden; Carole Malfatti
- Headquarters: Dallas, Texas, United States
- Products: Furniture; Art; Decor; Lighting; Housewares; Bedding; Rugs; Tableware
- Parent: Karat Home Inc. (2024–present)
- Website: zgallerie.com

Z Gallerie is an American chain of home furnishing, art and decor retail stores founded by siblings Joe Zeiden, Mike Zeiden, and Carole Malfatti in Sherman Oaks, California in 1979. The operation began as a small poster shop and started opening combined retail locations in 1982. The retailer was acquired by Brentwood Associates Private Equity V LP in 2014. Karat Home Inc. acquired Z Gallerie on Jan 19, 2024.

== History ==
In 1979, three siblings, Joe Zeiden, Carole Malfatti and Mike Zeiden opened a small poster shop in Sherman Oaks, California. Together, they operated the store during the day and framed posters at night in their parents garage in Van Nuys, California.

They moved their production poster company out of their childhood home and into an actual warehouse and before long, the young siblings had a number of locations across Los Angeles, California. They began to conceptualize stores that carried more than just poster art. Their vision was to create a collection of fashion-forward and exclusive home furnishings, art and accessories at an affordable price.

In 1982, the company diversified into home furnishings with the opening of its "Metro Dezign" store in Santa Monica, California. In June 1983 they combined their two stores under one roof and opened its first combination store, which included art, home furnishing and home accessories in San Francisco, California.

On April 10, 2009, the 54-store chain filed for Chapter 11 bankruptcy. On October 27, 2009, the retailer announced they had emerged from Chapter 11 bankruptcy with a $22 million financing package from Wells Fargo Business Credit.

On October 14, 2014, it was announced that Brentwood Associates Private Equity V LP acquired a majority stake in the retailer.

On March 11, 2019, Z Gallerie announced that it has filed voluntary petitions to restructure under Chapter 11 of the U.S. Bankruptcy Code in the United States Bankruptcy Court for the District of Delaware.

On July 1, 2019, it was announced that DirectBuy acquired Z Gallerie's assets through a bankruptcy auction for $20.3 million. The acquisition included the retailer's headquarters in Gardena, California and at least 32 stores. It was also announced that 17 locations would be closed with more closures being planned.

As of October 2022, the company had 25 stores remaining in operation, with just three states -- California, Florida and Texas -- accounting for half of all these locations.

On October 16, 2023, Z Gallerie's parent – DirectBuy – filed for bankruptcy, which marked Z Gallerie's third bankruptcy filing. The company planned to close all of its stores and seek a new buyer during the bankruptcy process. If no buyer was found, the company would have converted its bankruptcy to Chapter 7 and liquidate. 21 Z Gallerie locations conducted liquidation sales on October 25, 2023, and all stores shuttered by the end of 2023.

On January 19, 2024, Karat Home purchased furniture retailer Z Gallerie out of bankruptcy for $7.2 million and plans to rebuild the business with a goal to open physical Z Gallerie stores in 2025.

== Anti-dumping ==
In early 2014, the Department of Justice launched an investigation into a number of wooden bedroom furniture manufacturers that imported goods from China and the retailers to which the furniture was sold. As part of the investigation, the Department of Justice claimed that Z Gallerie and its suppliers mislabeled products they were importing into the United States in order to avoid customs duties. In 2016, Z Gallerie agreed to pay $15 million to settle the allegations.

== Charitable causes ==
Z Gallerie contributed a portion of sales to organizations during many of its grand openings and special events. Z Gallerie partnered with the Pancreatic Cancer Action Network in 2002. Between November 2 to November 4, 2012, it donated 10% of sales and $5 of each purchase of its aubergine Esque candle. In October 2014, it donated 10% of all sales for its location in The Mall at University Town Center. Between November 14 to November 16, 2014 it donated 10% of all sales from the Z Gallerie card.

It also donated 10% of all sales during its grand openings of its Carlsbad location in February 2004, its Watters Creek location in May 2013, its Village Meridian location in June 2014, and its Oakbrook Center in August 2014 to the American Diabetes Association.

== See also ==
- Retail apocalypse
- List of retailers affected by the retail apocalypse
