= Misco =

Computer hardware brand

Misco Technologies Limited
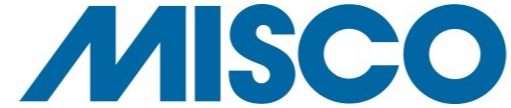
- Type: Limited company
- Industry: Computer hardware
- Founded: 1985; 41 years ago New Jersey, United States
- Headquarters: Wellingborough, England, United Kingdom
- Key people: Adam Muir, Gary Watson, Nathan Dorrington and Andy Stafford
- Revenue: £61m
- Owner: Gary Watson and Magdalena Gwizdz
- Website: www.misco.co.uk

Misco Technologies Limited is an online retailer based in the United Kingdom. It was formerly an IT brand whose ownership was split between Hilco Capital Limited and Systemax.

Sales were targeted at business, education, public sector and consumer markets, with sales being made online, via telephone and mail order catalogue. Misco also operated in Germany until their German operations were sold to CANCOM SE in July 2016. The Misco brand was relaunched on 1 July 2019, as part of the UK Computer Group Limited. In 2020 UK Computer Group re branded as Misco Technologies Limited.

In August 2020, Misco re-launched Comet.co.uk. In May 2025, Comet was sold to OnBuy.

== History ==
Misco was founded in New Jersey, United States, and ran a business of mail order sale of computer supplies and accessories. Gillette invested in Misco in 1983, taking a 40% stake, as part of a program to acquire high-growth low-risk businesses. Misco launched its first subsidiaries in Europe, concurrently in the United Kingdom and West Germany in October 1985, followed by Italy in 1986.

In November 1987, Gillette sold the company to the British company Electrocomponents plc, for the sum of £11,000,000. The effects of the beginning of the 1990s recession led Electrocomponents to sell Misco at a loss, in the beginning of 1993. The buyer, Global Computer Supplies, was controlled by Systemax Inc and HCS (Global) Ltd at the time..

== Restructuring and bankruptcy ==
In 2002, Global, now known as Systemax, began a program of restructuring. This would see its newly acquired Simply Computers business merge with Misco's operation in the United Kingdom in Wellingborough by February 2005. Also, logistics were established in a purpose-built warehouse in Greenock, Scotland.

The brick and mortar outlets founded by Simply were gradually closed down, a symptom of consumer trends moving away from the High Street and to online. Misco expanded its business from onwards of 2005, winning customer satisfaction awards from PriceGrabber, a performance award from Hitwise and achieving accreditations in ISIS and IDIS.

In April 2009, Misco announced plans for hiring remote sales agents on a work from home basis. In June 2013, Systemax opened the SSC in Budapest, Hungary, to support the EMEA countries's processes. In July 2016, Systemax sold Misco Germany to CANCOM SE. In March 2017, Systemax sold its EMEA Technology Products Group excluding its French operations to Hilco Capital Limited. On 19 October 2017, after an unsuccessful turnaround, Misco UK entered into administration.

On 12 December 2017, Misco Sweden filed for bankruptcy. On 7 June 2019, it was announced that the UK Computer Group (since renamed The Misco Group) had purchased the Misco Brand in the United Kingdom. The management team consists of a number of ex employees of Misco, and they have stated the intention was to relaunch misco.co.uk on 1 July 2019.
