= Longhorn =

Longhorn may refer to:

== Animals ==
- English Longhorn, a traditional long-horned brown and white breed of cattle
- Texas Longhorn, a breed of cattle
- Highland cattle, a Scottish breed sometimes called Highland Longhorn
- Longhorn beetle, a family of beetles with very long antennae

== In the US state of Texas ==
- Longhorn, Texas, a community
- Longhorn Dam, on the Colorado River in Austin
- Texas Longhorns, sports teams and organizations at the University of Texas at Austin
- Longhorn, the mascot (a Texas Longhorn bull) of J. Frank Dobie High School, Houston
- Longhorn, A candy of chocolate, pecans, and caramel made by Lammes Candy
- Longhorn Railway Company

== Technology ==
- Windows Longhorn, the pre-release internal Microsoft codename of Windows Vista
  - Longhorn Server, the original codename of Windows Server 2008
- Okapi Longhorn, a batch processing server in Okapi Framework
- Longhorn, a platform for Kubernetes maintained by SUSE's Rancher Labs

== Fictional characters ==
- Longhorn, a fictional character on the animated television show Freakazoid!
- Longhorn (Transformers), one of several characters in the various "Transformers" fictional universes

== Music ==
- Jay's Longhorn Bar, a former music venue in Minneapolis commonly known as "The Longhorn"
- "Longhorn", a piece of music used as the entrance theme for John Bradshaw Layfield, composed by Jim Johnston

== Other uses ==
- Farman MF.7 Longhorn, a French biplane flown in World War I
- Longhorn cheddar, a type of colby cheese
- Longhorn Kenya Limited, a Kenyan publishing company
- Longhorn Steakhouse, a chain of restaurants in the United States
- Weinheim Longhorns, an American football team in Weinheim, Germany
- The Longhorn, a 1951 American Western film
