= Software Spectrum =

- Industry: Software sales
- Headquarters: Garland, Texas, United States
- Parent: Level 3 Communications (2002-2006); Insight Enterprises (from 2006)

Software Spectrum is an American software reseller based in Garland, Texas. It is the world's largest Microsoft Large Account Reseller (LAR) and also sells software for PCs and servers, including Adobe, Symantec and Trend Micro. The company was acquired by Level 3 Communications in 2002 who sold it to Insight Enterprises in September 2006.

In addition to their headquarters in Garland, Texas, Software Spectrum (previously traded under the symbol SSPE) have offices in Spokane, Washington and Dublin, Ireland.and Sydney, Australia.
