= Good Guys (American company) =

Defunct Consumer electronics retailer

The Good Guys, Inc.
- Type: Electronics
- Industry: Retail
- Founded: July 1973
- Defunct: December 2006
- Fate: Acquired by CompUSA
- Headquarters: Brisbane, California; Alameda, California
- Products: Consumer electronics
- Website: Archived official website at the Wayback Machine (archive index)

Older logo, used from the 1980s to the late 1990s

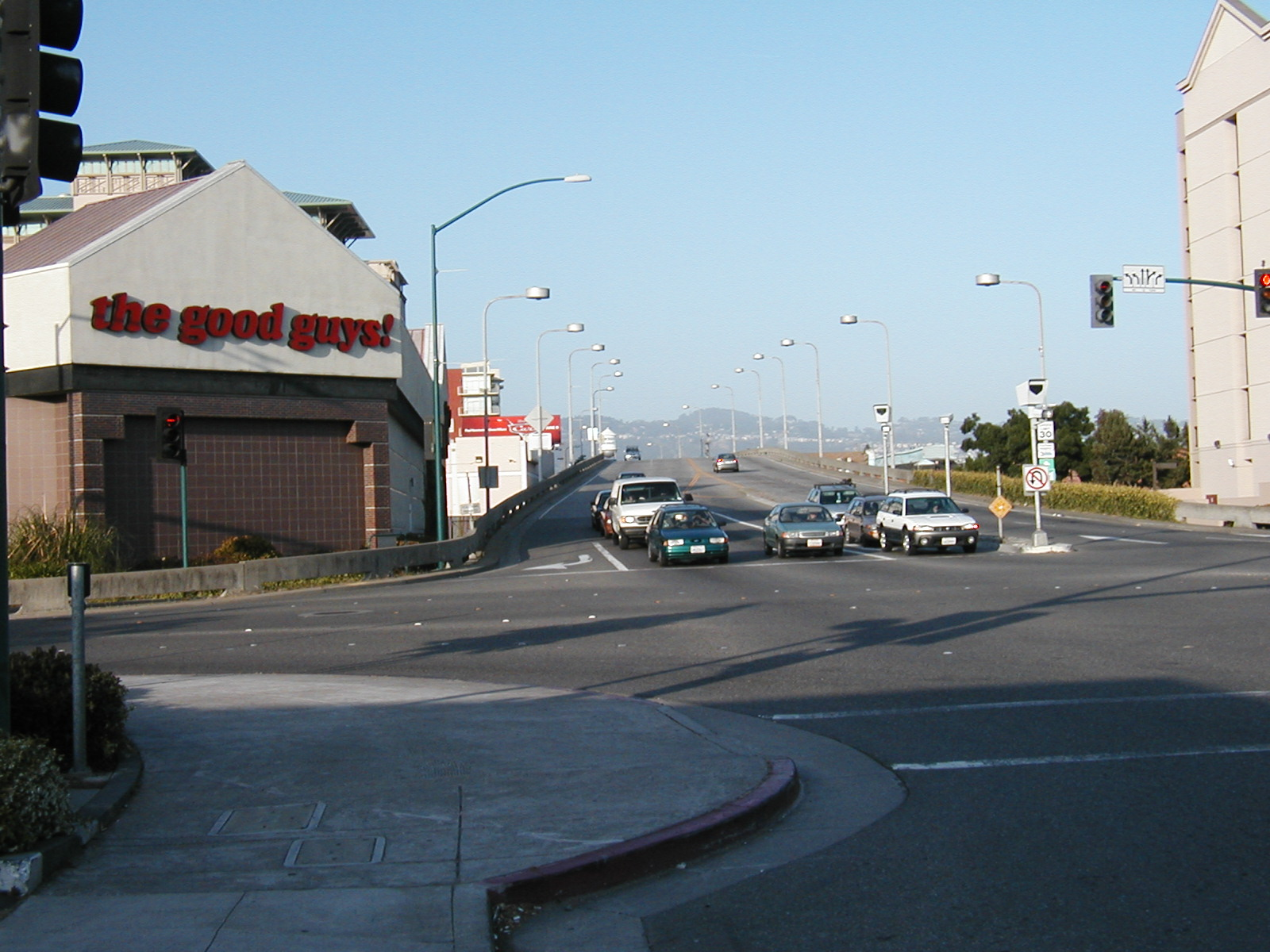
Exterior of vacated Good Guys store of in Emeryville, California, pictured in 2006

The Good Guys, Inc., was an American chain of consumer electronics retail stores with 71 stores in California, Nevada, Oregon, and Washington. The company was headquartered in Brisbane, California, in the Dakin Building in the early 1990s and subsequently in Alameda, California, until it was bought in late 2003 by Mexican businessman Carlos Slim, who also purchased CompUSA, OfficeMax, Barnes & Noble, Office Depot, Borders, and Circuit City. The Good Guys was founded in 1973 by Ron Unkefer on Chestnut Street, San Francisco. By 2006, all of the company's stores had closed.

== WOW! Stores ==
In 1995, The Good Guys teamed up with Tower Records to create one "WOW!" Store in Las Vegas, Nevada, featuring a mixture of Tower and Good Guys inventory and a coffee shop and included the world's largest promotional slot machine. Tower's founder Russell Solomon reportedly liked the end result and two more WOW! Multimedia Superstores were opened, one in Long Beach, California, where Neil Diamond played at the grand opening and others opened in Laguna Hills and San Mateo, California. By 2006, Tower was bankrupt and Good Guys was being consolidated into CompUSA; thus, all of the Good Guys stores closed.

== Re-launch ==
After all The Good Guys stores closed, CompUSA began marketing all California and Hawaii stores as "CompUSA with The Good Guys Inside" in response to Best Buy's new marketing campaign "with Magnolia Inside". This marketing campaign was dropped in an attempt to further separate CompUSA from the Good Guys name, and assist in launching its new Home Entertainment sections in select locations. The Good Guys name once again ceased to exist in 2008 when CompUSA closed its remaining stores. Extended warranties on televisions purchased through The Good Guys or CompUSA can still be accessed through General Electric Extended Warranties.

== Hostage crisis ==
In 1991, one of the stores in the chain located in Sacramento was taken over by four gunmen. This event became the largest hostage rescue operation on home soil in U.S. history to date, with about 50 hostages being held at gunpoint.
