= TigerDirect =

Consumer Electronics Retailer

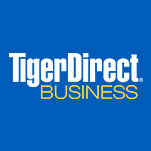
- Formerly: BLOC Development Corp. (1985-1987)
- Type: Subsidiary
- Industry: Retail
- Predecessors: Circuit City; CompUSA
- Founded: 1985; 41 years ago
- Founders: Gilbert Fiorentino; Carl Fiorentino; Karlton Norman; Orlando Ramos
- Defunct: March 31, 2023; 3 years ago
- Fate: Ceased operations
- Headquarters: El Segundo, California, United States
- Areas served: United States
- Key people: Frank Khulusi (CEO)
- Products: Computer hardware, software, peripherals, gaming, electronics
- Parent: Insight Enterprises
- Website: Archived official website at the Wayback Machine (archive index)

TigerDirect was an El Segundo, California-based online retailer dealing in electronics, computers, and computer components. The company was previously owned by Systemax, which is known for its acquisitions of the intellectual property of the defunct U.S. retail chains Circuit City and CompUSA and relaunching them as online retailers. The two brands were subsequently shuttered in late December 2012 and consolidated into the TigerDirect site.

In 2015, TigerDirect phased out all of its remaining brick-and-mortar retail operations, and PCM Inc. acquired Systemax's online North American technology retail business. In 2019, TigerDirect closed its online business servicing Canada.

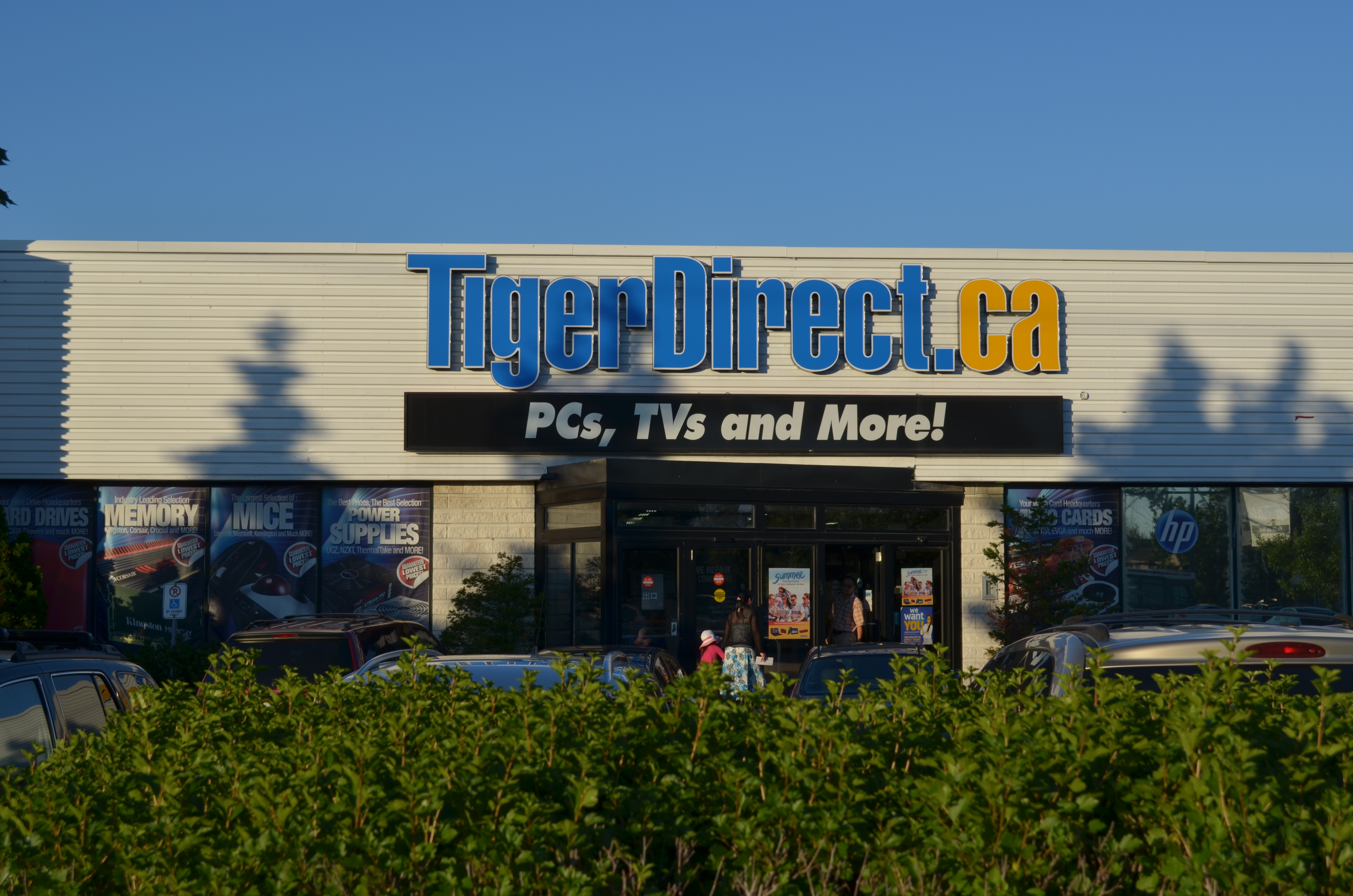
TigerDirect in Canada

The bulk of the company's business was based on web and catalog computer electronics sales, where TigerDirect had carved out a niche by placing a heavy emphasis on rebate marketing as a way to offer lower prices. The company also operated retail store and business-to-business channels.

== History ==
The company was founded as BLOC Development Corp., a publisher of utility and application software products starting with FormTool, in 1985. The original company was a pioneer in utility software with several top 10 titles. The original founders were: Frank Millman, Jorge Torres, Frank Haggar, Phil Bolin, Stephan Whitney, and Bob Horton. Frank Milman and Jorge Torres conceptualized the first product "FormTool".

In 1989, Tiger Software became a subsidiary of publicly held Bloc Development Corporation. BLOC Development was also the parent company of BLOC Publishing (a sister company of TigerSoftware), which continued the development and publishing of the company's flagship product "FormTool", and 20 other products; and SoftSync, former publisher of the "EXPERT Software" titles and the Macintosh accounting software "Accountant Inc."). BLOC Development later changed its name to TigerDirect.

TigerDirect abandoned the profitable software development in favor of the TigerSoftware catalog by 1991. Unfortunately, the new model under the leadership of Gilbert Fiorentino was unprofitable, and the company was sold in distress to Global DirectMail (now known as Systemax). In 1994 TigerDirect launched a series of profitable smaller catalogs that included GraphicsExpress, as well as CDROM and Mac catalogs. In 1996, after an aborted attempt at acquisition by Hanover House, it was acquired by Systemax (NYSE: SYX)

=== Acquisition of CompUSA and Circuit City brands ===
On January 6, 2008, Systemax announced the acquisition of the CompUSA brand, trademarks and e-commerce business, and as many as 16 CompUSA retail outlets in Illinois, Florida, Texas and Puerto Rico. On May 13, 2009, Systemax similarly acquired Circuit City's intellectual property, including its trademarks, brand name, and domain names. The deal took effect six days later for a price of $14 million. The defunct CircuitCity.com website was restored after the Systemax purchase. In late-December 2012, both brands were shuttered and consolidated into TigerDirect.com.

=== Retail closing, sale to PCM ===
On March 16, 2015, TigerDirect announced that it would close all but three of its retail stores in an effort to focus exclusively on online and business-to-business sales. Canadian operations consisted of 6 stores in Southern Ontario and all closed in 2015 (and replaced by the online distribution centre in Richmond Hill under Acrodex or PCM Canada) The locations left open were located in Jefferson, Georgia, Guaynabo, Puerto Rico, and its headquarters location at Miami, Florida. The company also closed a distribution center in Naperville, Illinois.

In November 2015, PCM Inc. acquired Systemax's "North American Technology Group", including TigerDirect, for $14 million. The division had, by late 2015, incurred operating losses of $68 million (in contrast to its other businesses, which had an operating profit). The acquisition was closed on December 1, 2015 with the sale of its business-to-business customer list and intellectual property. The transfer of Systemax's web assets is to occur by February 15, 2016. The company also announced the shutdown of its remaining distribution center and retail stores.

In late-December 2015, the site began holding a clearout sale with no returns accepted; a company spokesperson stated that the site was liquidating its current stock in preparation for its formal transfer to PCM.

=== Website re-launch and closures ===
TigerDirect re-launched its electronics e-commerce website on February 15, 2016 under PCM Inc. ownership. The new TigerDirect.com was a technology store offering a wide variety of technology products. Tiger Direct maintained a substantial B2B customer base and restructured its marketing engine to serve newer customers under the parent company of PCM. PCM also operated TigerDirect.ca for their Canadian operations. Its Canadian website closed in November 2019, and in the end of March 2023 the company ceased all retail operations.

== Legal and other issues ==
=== Federal Trade Commission ruling ===
On November 4, 1999, case C3903, the Federal Trade Commission issued a decision and order against TigerDirect for violations of the Pre-sale Availability Rule, the Disclosure Rule and the Warranty Act. Without admitting any wrongdoing, TigerDirect agreed to "not represent that it provides On-Site Service unless all limitations and conditions that apply are disclosed", "fulfill obligations under the warranty within a reasonable period of time after receiving notice from the consumer", and "cease and desist from failing to make warranty text available for examination prior to sale, failing to disclose what is not covered under any given warranty or the procedures needed to have warranty work accomplished and failing to disclose that certain states may give the consumer legal rights in addition to those provided by the warranty."

=== Apple Computer lawsuit ===
In early 2005, the company filed a lawsuit against Apple Computer Inc. (now Apple Inc.), alleging trademark infringement, dilution and false designation of origin with Apple's introduction of Mac OS X v10.4, marketed with its codename "Tiger". Although TigerDirect had registered several tiger-related names with the United States Patent and Trademark Office, Apple received trademark approval for version 10.4 (Tiger) of its OS X operating system in 2003. TigerDirect registered opposition against Apple's filing with the Trademark Trial and Appeal Board, and on May 13, 2005, Apple won an emergency hearing. The judge ruled in favor of Apple, considering the marks to be distinct.

=== InfoWorld report ===
InfoWorld's Robert X. Cringely reported in 2006 that "Tiger's sister company OnRebate.com, which handles payouts for the discount dealer, appears to specialize in the 'insufficient documentation' gambit," Consumer-reported difficulties obtaining the rebates led to an investigation by the Florida Attorney General and a failure to maintain a satisfactory BBB rating. According to a former controller at TigerDirect, improperly unpaid rebates were intentional: "...the concept was that if the customer complains, you send them out the check to make them happy. But if they don't complain, they totally forget about it. That is the concept of these rebates. People forget that they sent them out."

=== Dell lawsuit ===
On April 17, 2009, Dell filed a lawsuit against TigerDirect. Dell alleged that TigerDirect, a former authorized reseller of Dell products, sold discontinued and outdated Dell products as new and under a Dell warranty. Dell also alleged that the products were from a third-party and advertised with an unauthorized, modified version of the Dell logo. Dell became aware of this when TigerDirect customers contacted Dell to demand price matches.

=== State of Florida lawsuit ===
On September 4, 2009, Florida Attorney General Bill McCollum filed suit against TigerDirect, OnRebate, and their parent company Systemax, charging the companies with failing to provide rebates to customers. Systemax responded that a separate class action lawsuit making similar allegations had been filed in federal court in 2007 and was dismissed on August 31, 2009. The company denied the allegations in the Florida Attorney General complaint; the suit was eventually settled for $300,000.

=== CBC investigation ===
In 2014, Marketplace, a Canadian consumer advocacy newsmagazine show on CBC Television, TigerDirect was featured in Season 42, Episode 4, 'Faking It,' "Online reviews: When companies edit your review". The show featured a consumer who had purchased several computers from the retailer and subsequently gave a poor review for service. The review was edited by TigerDirect prior to the review being placed on the firm's website. The consumer contacted TigerDirect several times to have the edited review removed but failed until Marketplace contacted TigerDirect, on his behalf.

=== Founders convicted of fraud ===
In 2014, brothers Carl and Gilbert Fiorentino were arrested and charged in federal court with scheming to obtain $9 million in kickbacks and other benefits and to hide their gains from the Internal Revenue Service while working as senior executives at Systemax Inc. and its TigerDirect Inc. unit. The government alleged the brothers schemed to obtain kickbacks for steering company business to certain contractors between 2002 and 2011. In one case, the brothers received more than $9 million in cash and other payments for steering more than $230 million in business to an Asian supplier of computer parts and accessories. In 2015 Gilbert Fiorentino pleaded guilty to a conspiracy charge, while Carl Fiorentino pleaded guilty to both fraud conspiracy and tax evasion. Carl Fiorentino had faced significantly more time than Gilbert Fiorentino, but U.S. District Judge Jose E. Martinez decided to sentence them to similar prison terms. Gilbert received 5 years in prison while Carl received 6 1/2 years. In March 2016, the Fiorentino brothers were ordered to pay a total of $35 million in restitution to Systemax.
