= Global Industrial Company =

American industrial and MRO product company

- Formerly: Systemax
- Type: Public
- Traded as: NYSE: GIC; Russell 2000 Component
- Industry: Industrial Supplies and MRO
- Founded: 1949; 77 years ago
- Headquarters: Port Washington, New York, U.S.
- Area served: Nationwide
- Key people: Anesa Chaibi (CEO); Tex Clark (CFO)
- Revenue: ▲US$1.38 billion (2025)
- Net income: ▲US$72.1 million (2025)
- Divisions: Industrial Products
- Subsidiaries: Global Industrial; Nexel; Infotel; C&H Distributors; Avenue Industrial Supply Company; Indoff Incorporated
- Website: www.globalindustrial.com

Global Industrial Company is a Port Washington, New York–based company providing industrial and MRO (maintenance, repair, and operating supply) products through a system of branded e-Commerce websites and relationship marketers in North America. The primary brand is Global Industrial.

The company was founded in 1949 as Global Equipment Company, a material handler. It first entered direct marketing in 1972 and began marketing computer equipment in 1981. The company changed its name to Global Direct-mail, in 1995 and to Systemax in 1999 and Global Industrial Company in 2021.

Former Systemax logo

== Subsidiaries and divisions ==
Subsidiaries and divisions of Global Industrial Company include Nexel, Infotel, C&H Distributors and Avenue Industrial Supply Company.

=== Acquisition of CompUSA ===
On January 6, 2008, Systemax Inc. announced an agreement on the acquisition of the Miami-based CompUSA brand, trademarks, and e-commerce business, and as many as 16 CompUSA retail outlets in Florida, Texas, and Puerto Rico. The first new CompUSA store under Systemax ownership was opened in November 2009.

=== Acquisition of Circuit City trademarks and website ===
On May 13, 2009, Circuit City announced it would sell its intellectual property, including its trademarks, brand name, and internet domain, to Systemax for $14 million. The deal took effect six days later. The defunct CircuitCity.com website was restored after the Systemax purchase.

In late December 2012, CompUSA and Circuit City were both consolidated into TigerDirect, which Systemax sold to PCM, Inc. on December 1, 2015.

=== Acquisition of WStore Europe ===
On September 18, 2009, Systemax announced the acquisition of WStore Europe, SA, a European supplier of business IT products with operations in France (Inmac WStore SAS and I-Com Software) and in the United Kingdom (WStore UK Limited).

=== Acquisition of Misco Solutions (SCC Netherlands) ===
On June 12, 2014, Systemax announced the acquisition of SCC Services B.V., a supplier of business-to-business IT products and services with operations in the Netherlands. This subsidiary was renamed Misco Solutions.

=== Acquisition of Plant Equipment Group (“PEG”) ===
On January 30, 2015, Systemax announced the acquisition of the Plant Equipment Group ("PEG"), a business-to-business direct marketer of maintenance, repair and operations ("MRO") products, from TAKKT America . PEG serves business customers within the North American MRO market.

=== Sale of TigerDirect ===
On December 1, 2015, Systemax announced the sale of certain Business to Business assets of its North American Technology Group, including TigerDirect to PCM, Inc.

=== Sale of German Operations to CANCOM SE ===
On July 25, 2016, Systemax announced the sale of its Misco Germany assets to CANCOM SE.

=== Sale of European Technology Products Group Businesses ===
On March 27, 2017, Systemax announced the sale of all its European Technology Products Group Businesses, excluding their operations in France.

Sale of French-based Information Technology Business

On September 4, 2018, Systemax announced it has closed the previously announced sale of its France-based IT business to Bechtle AG.

== Legal disputes ==
On September 17, 2012, the U.S. Securities and Exchange Commission (SEC) charged a former director of Systemax Inc for fraudulently reaping hundreds of thousands of dollars in undisclosed compensation between January 2006 to December 2010. The SEC alleged that Gilbert Fiorentino, who in addition to serving on the board was the former chief executive of Systemax's Technology Products Group in Miami, "obtained more than $400,000 in extra compensation directly from firms that conducted business with Systemax." The SEC also alleged Fiorentino of stealing "several hundred thousand dollars worth of company merchandise that was used to market Systemax’s products." Fiorentino failed to disclose his extra compensation and perks to Systemax or its auditors, so that the amounts reported to shareholders were understated.

In April 2011, Systemax placed Fiorentino on administrative leave. On May 9, 2011, Fiorentino agreed to resign from all of his positions with Systemax, surrender stock and stock options valued at approximately $9.1 million, and repay his 2010 annual bonus of $480,000. With Fiorentino's departure, Robert Leeds, Systemax's founding CEO of the technology division, took over as CEO of Systemax's technology products group.

Fiorentino agreed to settle the SEC charges by paying a $65,000 fine and consenting to a permanent bar from serving as an officer or director of any publicly held company.

On December 3, 2014, Gilbert and Carl Fiorentino pleaded guilty for their participation in a bribery scheme, after it was found that between during his employment, Carl had received over $7 million in kickbacks from suppliers he had entered into agreements with Systemax, and obscured his participation in these agreements to Systemax. Gilbert was also charged with conspiracy to commit securities fraud and impeding the operation of the IRS.

== Restatement ==
On February 21, 2005, the company restated financial results for each of the first three quarters of 2004 and the year ended Dec. 31, 2003, following the discovery of certain inventory accounting errors at the company's British unit. On May 11, 2005, the company restated its results for the year 2004, following the discovery of errors in accounting for inventory at its Tiger Direct Inc. unit, an online retailer.

== Global Industrial ==
Global Industrial
- Type: Subsidiary
- Traded as: NYSE: GIC
- Founded: 1949; 77 years ago, in New York City, New York, US
- Founder: Michael Leeds; Paul Leeds
- Headquarters: Port Washington, New York
- Products: Industrial supplies, office supplies, electrical supplies and equipment, plumbing supplies and hardware, HVAC supplies and parts, storage equipment, safety equipment
- Parent: Global Industrial Company
- Website: globalindustrial.com

Global Industrial is a business unit of Global Industrial Company, a Fortune 1000 company, and is listed on the New York Stock Exchange. Global Industrial is incorporated in New York as Global Equipment Company Inc., and conducts business under the names Global Industrial, Global Industrial Equipment, Globalindustrial.ca and GlobalIndustrial.com. The company sells industrial products and office supplies through direct to business channels with headquarters in Port Washington, New York.

== History ==
Global Industrial was established in 1949 by Michael and Paul Leeds in Queens, New York as a material handling equipment supplier. In 1985 the company began to deal with computer products. Through acquisitions of other computer-supply companies, the company expanded across the U.S. and into parts of Europe, with a revenue of nearly $180 million by 1990.

According to the company website, it sells over 1,000,000 products via online sales and call center.

Global Industrial has been accredited by the Better Business Bureau since June 2002.

Global Industrial was ranked number 21 on Modern Distribution Management's Top 40 Industrial Distributors in 2017.

== See also ==
- TigerDirect
- CompUSA
- Circuit City
- Misco
- Global Industrial
