= Insight Enterprises =

Global technology provider

Insight Enterprises Inc.
- Type: Public
- Traded as: Nasdaq: NSIT; S&P 600 Component
- Industry: IT Solutions; Business to Business; Commercial & Public Sector
- Founded: 1988; 38 years ago
- Founder: Eric Crown; Tim Crown
- Headquarters: Tempe, Arizona, United States
- Area served: Worldwide
- Key people: Jack Azagury (CEO & president; James Morgado (CFO); Rob Green (CDO); Eduoard Ibrahim; (President EMEA)
- Products: Data center; Devices; Servers; Software; Licensing; Power; Storage; IT Services; software development
- Revenue: ▼US$8.25 billion (2025)
- Net income: ▼US$157 million (2025)
- Number of employees: 15,000 (2024)
- Subsidiaries: BlueMetal; Ignia; Datalink; Caase.com; Cardinal Solutions; PCM; Amdaris
- Website: insight.com/en_US/home.html

Insight Enterprises Inc. is an Arizona-based publicly traded global technology company that focuses on business-to-business and information technology (IT) for enterprises. The company is listed on the Fortune 500 and has offices in 19 countries.

Jack Azagury has been CEO since April 13, 2026.

== History ==
=== Early years ===
Hard Drives International was founded in 1988 by Eric and Tim Crown. Initially a mail order business selling computer storage, the company expanded into a storefront when credit card companies declined service. In 1991, the company changed its name to Insight Enterprises, and distribution included a full line of computers and accessories. The company held its initial public offering in January 1995.

Insight became an international company when it acquired TC Computers, based in Montreal, Canada, in 1997. In April 1998, Insight signed an agreement to acquire Choice Peripherals Ltd. and Plusnet Technologies Ltd., an Internet service provider and website hosting and development company operating as Force 9. The acquisition expanded Insight's operations to Europe.

=== 2000–2010 ===
Insight acquired Action Computer Supplies Holdings PLC, a U.K.-based direct marketer, in October 2001 for approximately $150 million in stock. In April 2002, the company acquired Comark for $150 million, increasing Insight's ability to work with clients of all sizes, including the public sector.

In July 2006, Insight entered an agreement to purchase Software Spectrum, a company which focused on software and mobility products for medium and large companies, from Level 3 Communications for $287 million.

Calence LLC, a technology company focused on Cisco networking and advanced communications, was acquired by Insight in April 2008 for $125 million. Insight acquired U.K.-based Minx Ltd., a European network integrator with Cisco Gold Partner accreditation, in July 2008 for $1.5 million and the assumption of $4.6 million of existing debt.

=== Since 2011 ===
Ensynch, an information technology company founded in 2000, was acquired by Insight in September 2011. Insight acquired Inmac Gmbh, a business-to-business hardware reseller based in Germany, in February 2012.

In June 2015, Insight underwent a corporate rebranding. In October 2015, Insight acquired BlueMetal, an interactive design and technology architecture firm based in Boston.

Also in 2015, Insight raised $200,000 in its annual campaign for its Noble Cause division. Through Noble Cause, Insight gives to local charities including the Make-a-Wish Foundation, the Boys & Girls Clubs of America and the Ronald McDonald House.

In 2016, BlueMetal partnered with INDYCAR, the Indianapolis Motor Speedway and Microsoft to produce an analytics focused app during the Indianapolis 500.

Insight opened an additional sales center at the Meadows Office and Technological Park in Conway, Arkansas in August 2016.

Insight announced the acquisition of Ignia, an Australian-based business technology consulting company, in September 2016.

In November 2016, Insight Enterprises announced that they were acquiring the Eden Prairie, Minnesota-based data center services and services company, Datalink for $11.25 per share in cash, but that the company would remain mostly the same. The $258 million deal closed in the first quarter of 2017 and allowed Insight Enterprises to enhance its data center services.

In 2017, Insight announced the acquisition of Dutch cloud service provider Caase.com.

In August 2019, Insight Enterprises announced the acquisition of PCM, Inc., a provider of IT products and services, expanding Insight's operations in the US, Canada and the UK.

In December 2023, Insight Enterprises acquired SADA, one of the largest Google Cloud partners in the world, for $410 million, making SADA a part of the Insight family.

In September 2023, Insight Enterprises acquired Amdaris, one of the leading software development company in the UK and Eastern Europe, adding approx 900 employees to the Insight family. New World Tech, based in the UK, was acquired in July 2024.

=== Sports Affiliation ===
Insight Enterprises was the title sponsor of the Insight.com Bowl from 1997 through 2001, then the Insight Bowl (named the Rate Bowl as of 2024) from 2002 through 2011.
