= PCM, Inc. =

U.S. computer retailing company

- Formerly: Creative Computers, Inc. (1987–2000); IdeaMall, Inc. (2000–2001); PC Mall, Inc. (2001–2012)
- Industry: Direct Marketer
- Founded: 1987; 39 years ago in Marina Del Rey, California, United States as Creative Computers Inc.
- Founder: Frank Khulusi, Sam Khulusi
- Defunct: August 26, 2019
- Fate: Acquired by Insight Enterprises
- Headquarters: El Segundo, California, United States
- Area served: United States
- Products: Computer hardware, Consumer electronics, Information technology
- Divisions: PCM Sales, Inc. PCMG, Inc. PCM Sales Canada, Inc. PCM Logistics LLC; Abreon, Inc. PCM BPO, LLC; M2 Marketplace, Inc.

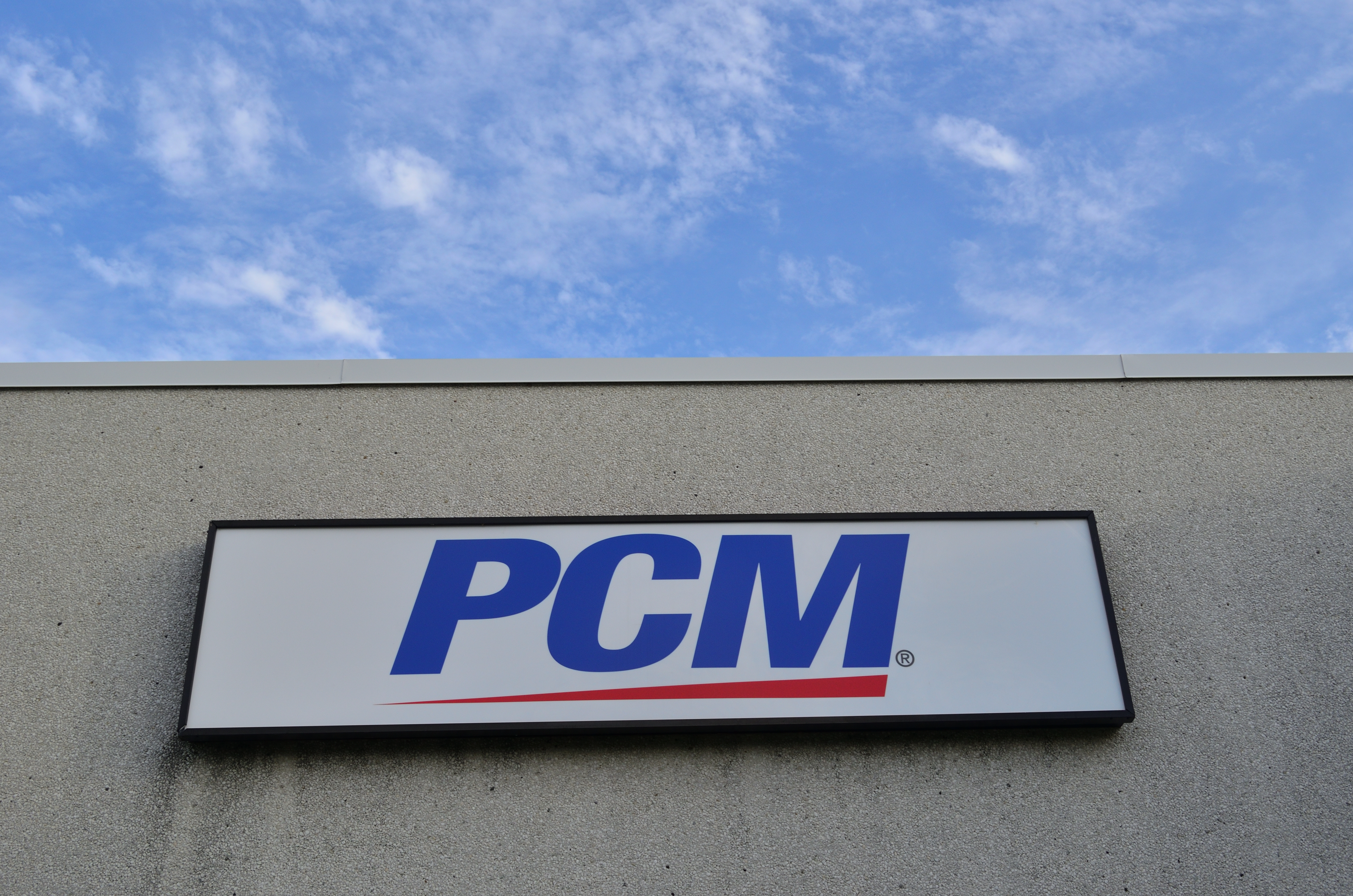
PCM office in Canada

PCM, Inc. was a direct marketing company that offered technology products and services. The company was based in El Segundo, California. The company merged with Insight Enterprises on August 26, 2019. PCM was founded in 1987 as a direct market catalog via telemarketing, the Internet, direct marketing, print catalogs, and three retail showrooms.

The company had an annual total revenue of US$2.25 billion and had over 40 locations in the United States, Canada, Pakistan and the Philippines. It employed around 3,400 people worldwide as of 2016.

== History ==
=== As Creative Computers Inc. ===
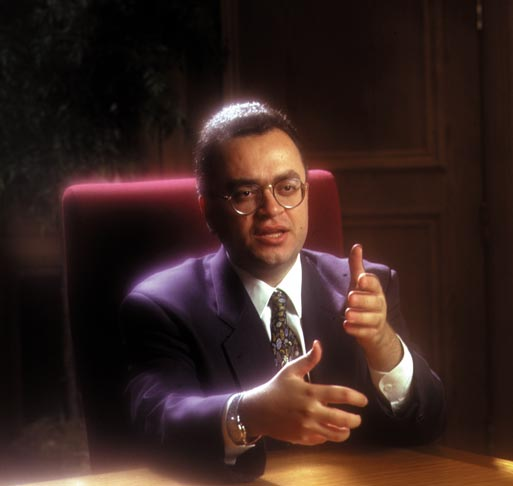
Frank Khulusi - CEO and founder of PCM Inc.

The company now known as PCM was founded by two brothers, Sam and Frank Khulusi, in 1987 under the name of “Creative Computers”. Creative Computers was launched from the founders’ residence in Marina Del Rey, CA. The company was set up as a mail order catalog company whereby products are advertised through paper flyers/catalogs. Interested customers called in their orders through the provided toll-free "1-800" phone number. The founders then took the order and placed purchase orders to acquire sold products, bill the customers’ credit card and ship the products to the customers. At startup, the company's catalog consisted of only Amiga computers made by Commodore International. The company became the number one mail order reseller of Amiga computers. In 1993/1994 Commodore went through financial difficulties, which caused it to close its operation in April 1994.

In early 1994, PC Mall obtained authorization to sell Apple computers through its mail order catalog model. The authorization came at an opportune time as the Commodore operation was soon to close. With the Apple authorization and the anticipated growth, PC Mall moved its operation from the back of a retail store to a call center with over 100 seats, a 35,000-square-foot (3,300 m^{2}) distribution center, and over 15,000-square-foot (1,400 m^{2}) of corporate office space.

In first quarter of 1995, the company filed for its initial public offering and went public in April 1995.

In January 2000, Creative Computers changed its name to IdeaMall, Inc. The following year, the company changed its name again to PC Mall, Inc.

=== Growth and acquisitions ===
In early 1995, the company expanded its catalog to include PC Wintel products as well. To support the growth, the company moved its distribution center to a 212,000-square-foot (19,700 m^{2}) facility next to the FedEx hub in Memphis, Tennessee, in the third quarter of 1995. In addition to the millions of catalogs mailed monthly, the company launched its first web sites macmall.com and pcmall.com in 1996.

In 1996–1997, the company acquired Computability, a Milwaukee-based company, and Elek-Tek, a Chicago-based company, both dealing primarily with PC Wintel products.

In 2001, the company acquired Wareforce, a southern California-based company. In 2002, the company acquired Club Mac, another southern California-based operation.

In 2011, the company launched its website onSale.com, which focuses on daily deals and electronic products, via the Internet.

In third quarter 2006, PC Mall Gov, Inc., a wholly owned subsidiary of PC Mall, Inc., acquired the product business of GMRI, a Virginia-based company. GMRI provides IT consulting and technology for Federal agencies.

Then in the third quarter of 2007, the company acquired SARCOM, which was based in Lewis Center, Ohio, into which Wareforce's operations were subsequently folded. Focusing on enterprise-level businesses, SARCOM offers technology products and services. Abreon Inc, a division of SARCOM that provides consulting and training operation for mid-market and enterprise businesses, continues to operate as Abreon.

In December 2009, the company acquired the assets of Data Systems Worldwide (DSW), a converged networking company, and in June 2010, they acquired NSPI, a managed services company. Both DSW and NSPI's operations are now secured under the SARCOM subsidiary.

Venturing into the realm of social networking for the first time, the company launched its Small Business Network, or SBN, in 2009. SBN is an online meeting place catering to the needs of small businesses and small business owners.

The company started HealthDynamix, based in Manassas, Virginia, in early 2010. This division provides information technologies and services for healthcare and medical industries.

In December 2012, the company changed its corporate name to PCM, Inc. from PC Mall, Inc. in connection with the rebranding, effective January 2, 2013, PCM Common Stock commenced trading on NASDAQ under the ticker PCMI and no longer trades under the prior ticker of MALL.

In December 2012, PCM completed the purchase of 7.9 acres of land towards the construction of a new cloud data center that it opened in late June 2014. The Tier III facility is strategically located in a data center-centric development in New Albany, Ohio. The new facility is said to complement its two existing data centers and a 24/7 Integrated Operations Center (IOC) located in Atlanta, Georgia, enhancing PCM managed service offerings, including cloud services, data center hosting and management, remote monitoring and disaster recovery.

In April 2015, PCM completed its acquisition of IT solutions provider En Pointe Technologies Sales, Inc. based in Gardena, California. The assets were acquired by an indirect wholly owned subsidiary of PCM, which now operates under the En Pointe brand.

In November 2015, PCM acquired the North American business-to-business operations of Systemax, including TigerDirect, for $14 million.

In January 2017, PCM acquired Canadian Microsoft Cloud solutions company Stratiform Inc for C$2.1 million.

In April, 2017, PCM announced its entry into the United Kingdom and Europe through a wholly owned subsidiary, PCM Technology Solutions UK, LTD, (“PCM UK”).

In September 2017, PCM UK acquired Stack Technology Holdings, Ltd (The Stack Group), a leading provider of technologies and services across the UK.

As of August 30, 2019, PCM has been acquired by Insight Enterprises.

== Subsidiaries ==
PCM, Inc. expansion has divided it into several divisions that cater to specific markets and functions.

- PCM Sales, Inc.

PCM Sales Inc. is the largest division in the company with almost 1,000 employees. The division provides technology and IT products that mostly cater to small and medium businesses through the company's main website, catalogs, and through the use of social media. This division also offers products, solutions, and services to corporate and enterprise clients.

- PCM Services

PCM Services is a division of PCM Inc. that provides computing, data management and other solutions to all PCM business customers.

- PCMG, Inc.

PCMG is a direct marketing reseller of IT products and services for the public or federal government and health care clientele in the United States. The subsidiary provides hardware, software, networking tools, peripherals, storage, supply, and other computing solutions for its target market. PCMG also provides computing, management, and IT design for the hospitals, medical clinics, private and public sectors, non-profit organizations, and companies that are engaged in health care.

- PCM Sales Canada, Inc.

A division of PCM Inc. based out of Montreal, Canada

- Acrodex Incorporated A PCM division handling TigerDirect.ca is based from Richmond Hill, Ontario and IT solutions from Edmonton, Alberta. Acquired by PCM in 2015.
- M2 Marketplace Inc.

M2 Marketplace Inc. is a division of PCM under the name MacMall that mainly targets consumers selling Macintosh computers, iPods, iPads, and all other Apple products. The division also caters to home and consumer technology products and services.

- PCM Logistics LLC

PCM Logistics supports administrative and fulfillment functions for its parent company, PCM. Based in El Segundo, California, it was founded in 2002 to cater services such as finance and accounting, advertising, information technology, operations, sales, human resources talent acquisition and management, and facilities.

- PCM BPO LLC

PCM BPO LLC is a wholly owned subsidiary of PCM Inc. located in Manila, Philippines. Established in 2005, the company provides back office support for marketing, customer service, IT operations, accounting, and sales of PCM and its subsidiaries in the United States.

== Financial Information ==
PCM was delisted from NASDAQ and trading was halted at 8 p.m. on August 29, 2019 after PCM merged with Insight Enterprises, Inc. (NASDAQ: NSIT) As a publicly traded company, PCM, Inc (NASDAQ: PCMI), has publicly available financial statements and reports. In 2013, PCM reported 1.424 billion in sales.
