= Lammes Candies =

American confectioner and chocolatier company

Lamme's Candies
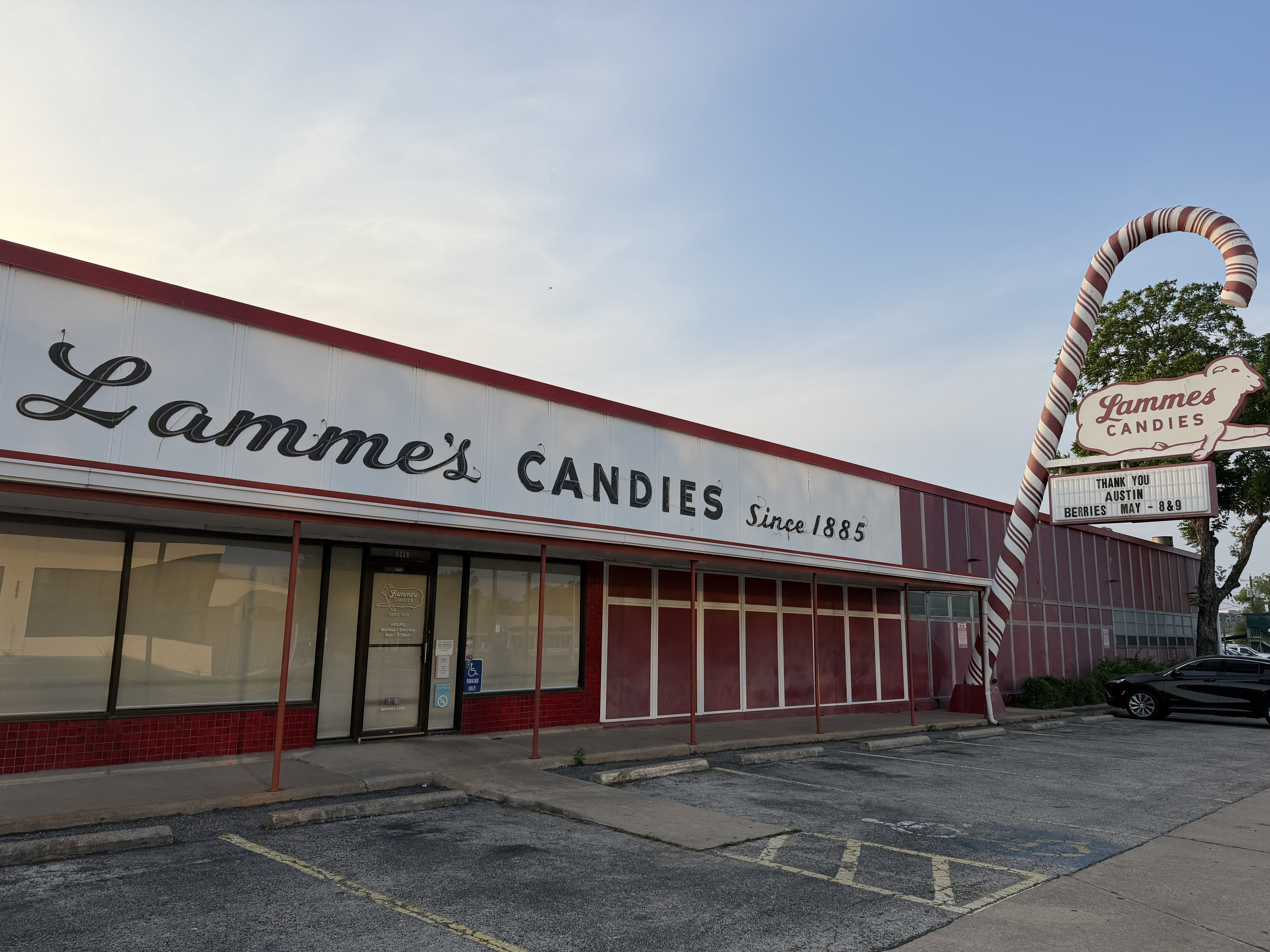
- Storefront in April 2026
- Interactive map of Lamme's Candies

Restaurant information
- Established: 1878
- Closed: 2026
- Owner: Lamme Family
- Food type: Candy
- Location: 5330 Airport Blvd, Austin, Texas, 78751, United States
- Coordinates: 30.3157°N 97.7146°W
- Seating capacity: 0
- Reservations: No
- Other locations: 1
- Website: https://lammes.com/

Lammes Candies (/læmz/) was a family-owned Texas confectionery and chocolatier company founded by William Wirt Lamme in 1878. It has been passed down through five generations of Lammes family members, and remained a vital part of Austin culture until its 2026 closure. Lammes offered over 1000 distinct confectioneries and sold them at their two retail locations, and mailed them with world-wide shipping.

== History ==
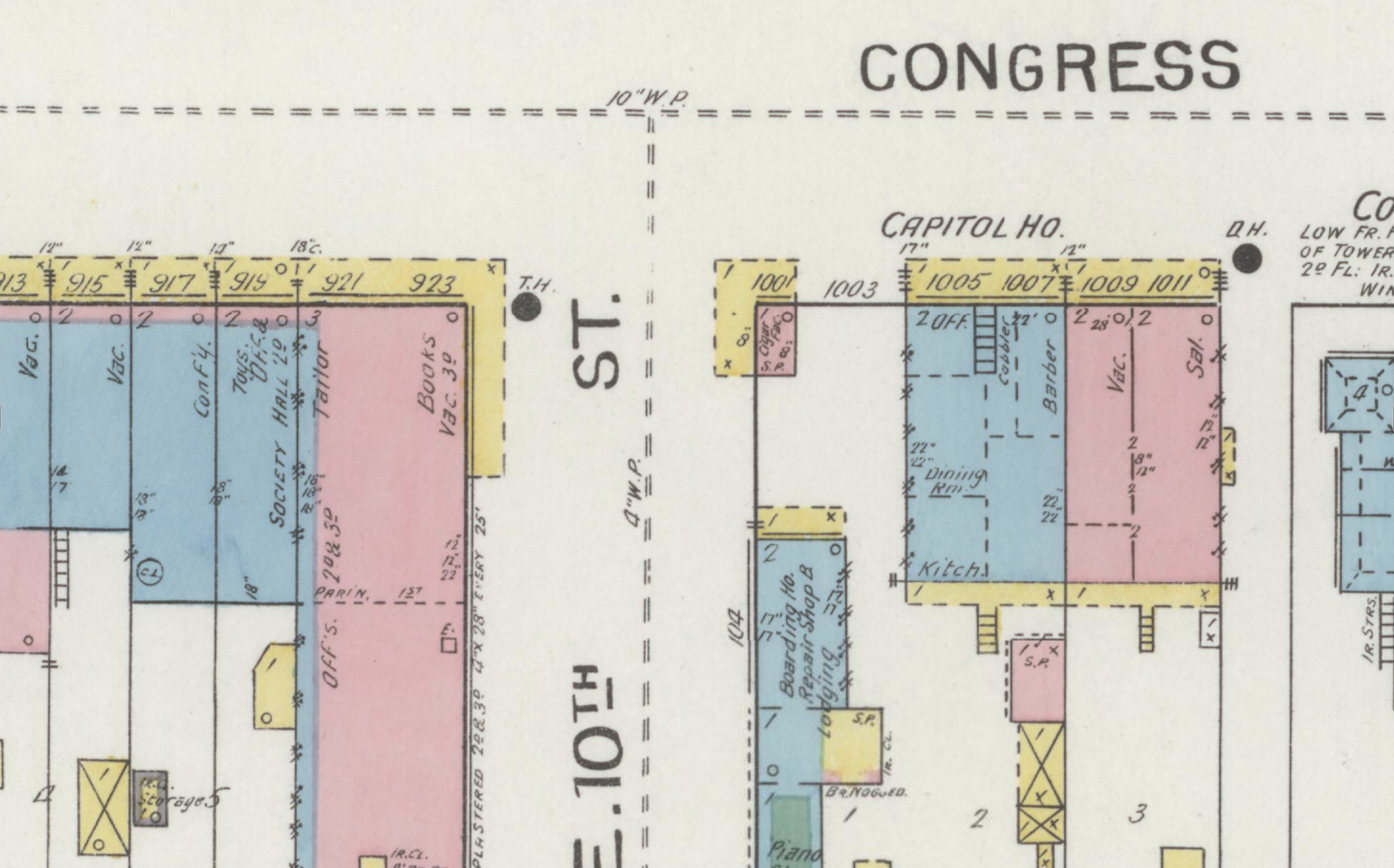
1894 Sanborn Fire Insurance Map of Austin showing location of Lammes Candy at 917 Congress Ave (labeled as Conf'y)

Originally called the "Red Front Candy Factory" William Wirt Lamme founded the business in 1878, and the shop opened its doors on the 800 block of Congress Ave. in Austin, Texas. In 1885, William lost the business while bettering in a poker game. William's son, David Turner Lamme Sr., came to Austin to pay the gambling debt ($800 then, or almost $27,000 today), and reclaim the business as his own. The store officially reopened on 10 July 1885, where it stayed for only a few years before being moved to another building on the 900 block of Congress Avenue.

In the beginning, Lammes specialized in selling ice cream and another dessert called Gem, made of whole milk and frozen fruit. Lammes continued serving ice cream and Gem until WWII, when production had to halt because of sugar rationing. Despite the availability of sugar after the war, ice cream never really caught on again. However, this was not disastrous for the business because in the meantime, they had been developing new treats for the people of Texas.

In 1892, after seven grueling years of recipe tasting, David Turner Lamme Sr. first produced the product that would continue to be their best seller even today: the famous "Texas Chewie" Pecan Praline. The praline is a simple dessert, consisting of pecans, corn syrup, sugar, butter, and salt. In the early days, Lammes produced all of their pralines with pecans growing from trees along the Colorado River, and today they still opt to use only Texas-grown pecans in their confectioneries. Initially, Lamme only cooked pralines by special order, waiting until he had enough orders to make a minimum batch of 25 pounds, which would eventually be shipped out through Lammes mail order division. However this did not last forever, and as Lammes grew in popularity, pralines finally became available to the public in the 1920s.

In 1957, Lammes moved locations again to Airport Blvd. in Austin and opened their dual factory and storefront there, where it is today. Since then, Lammes has stayed family owned and operated, passed down over 5 generations of candy makers, with its name changing to "Lammes Candies Since 1885, Inc." in 1965.

== Present ==
Today, Lammes Candies is owned by William Wirt Lamme's great-great-great-great-grandchildren: Pam, Bryan, and Lana. The company currently offers more than 1000 products, including taffy, brittle, and many other chocolates. Despite a wide variety, the "Texas Chewie" praline continues to be their number one best selling product.

Over the last forty years, Lammes had expanded to over seven locations across central Texas, however only two of those locations remain open today. Many people are drawn to Lammes because of their old-fashioned recipes and storefronts, their use of local ingredients, their in-house conveyor belt style production, and most importantly, their dedication to keeping their long legacy alive.

== Closure ==
After 141 years, Lammes Candies' will be closing their store. Round Rock store closed on April 24, 2026. The Austin 5330 Airport Blvd. store will remain open but eventually will also shut down. The decision was displayed at the Round Rock location and cites changing market conditions and issues with long-term sustainability of operations. At the time of its shutdown, Lammes Candies was the oldest continuously run family business in Austin.

The building Lammes Candies' occupied was purchased by Topo Development Group.
