= CompUSA =

Defunct retailer of consumer electronics

- Type: Public
- Industry: Retail
- Founded: 1984; 42 years ago (as Soft Warehouse); Addison, Texas, U.S. 2018; 8 years ago (as CompUSA.com)
- Defunct: 2008 (original), 2012 (Tiger Direct relaunch), 2023 (2018 relaunch)
- Fate: Absorbed into TigerDirect (original)
- Headquarters: Miami, Florida
- Products: Electronics
- Parent: Specialty Equity (2007–2008); Systemax (2008–2013); Source Brands Group, LLC.
- Website: www.compusa.com

CompUSA was an American retailer and reseller of personal computers, consumer electronics, technology products and computer services. Starting with one brick-and-mortar store in 1986 under the name Soft Warehouse, by the 1990s CompUSA had grown into a nationwide big box chain. At its peak, it operated at least 229 locations. Crushed by competition from other brick-and-mortar retailers, corporate oversight which was out of touch with evolving market realities, and a failure to make a strong transition to online sales, CompUSA began closing what they classified as "low performing" locations in 2006. By 2008 only 16 locations were left to be sold to Systemax. In 2012, remaining CompUSA and Circuit City stores were converted to TigerDirect stores, and later closed. As of 2023, the CompUSA online website redirects to an error page.

== History ==
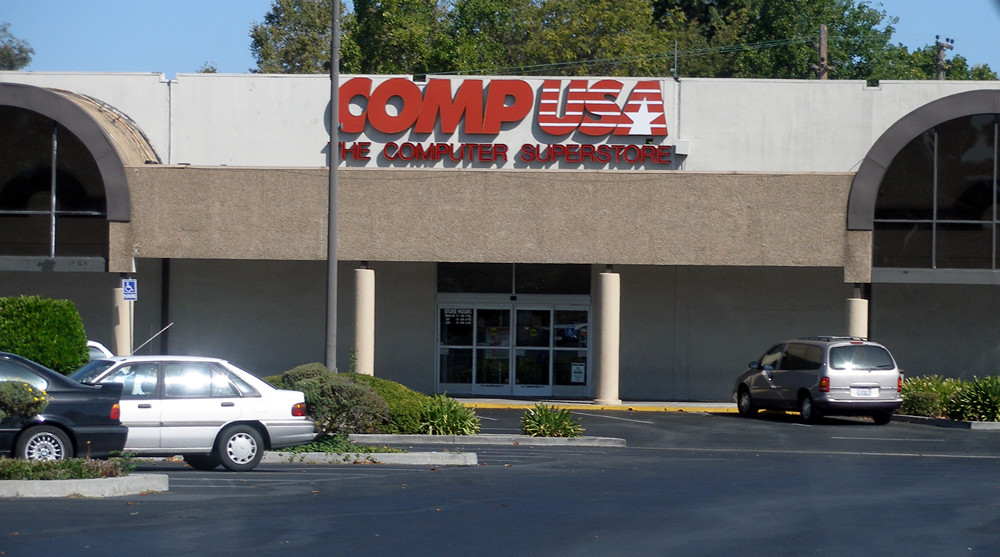
A CompUSA store in Santa Clara, California, circa 2005

Founded in 1984 as Soft Warehouse in Addison, Texas, a northern suburb of Dallas, Texas, by Errol Jacobson and Mike Henochowicz, the company began national expansion in 1988 with its first megastore opening in Atlanta, Georgia.

In 1991, the company's name was changed to CompUSA, and the company became publicly traded on the New York Stock Exchange. While under Nathan P. Morton's leadership, CompUSA grew to over $2 billion in revenues. Morton resigned in 1993.

Formerly headquartered in Miami, Florida, it was a wholly owned subsidiary of U.S. Commercial Corp S.A.B. de C.V. associated with Grupo Carso and indirectly controlled by a common shareholder, Carlos Slim.

On December 7, 2007, an affiliate of the restructuring and disposition firm Gordon Brothers Group, Specialty Equity, bought the company. Systemax purchased the CompUSA name, 16 retail locations and other company assets in January 2008.

Systemax operated CompUSA retail stores in California, Florida, Texas, Maryland, Georgia, Illinois, Delaware, New Jersey, North Carolina, Virginia, Washington and Puerto Rico, as well as CompUSA.com, a retail website and a dedicated catalog site for businesses.

On November 2, 2012, Systemax announced that it would drop both the CompUSA and Circuit City storefront names, consolidating their businesses under the name, TigerDirect. On December 4, 2013, CompUSA intellectual properties were sold to JASALI 645 Realty LLC. On October 25, 2018, the intellectual properties of CompUSA were leased to DealCentral, and has announced to relaunch CompUSA.com in that same day.

=== Timeline ===
- 1986 – Under the original name Soft Warehouse, the first of their super stores opens on Marsh Lane and Belt Line Road in Addison, Texas
- 1988 – Opened their second store in Atlanta, Georgia
- 1990 – Long running radio ad campaign featuring character "P.C. Modem" (played by actor Jack Riley) begins.
- 1993 – Began offering technical services at customer locations.
- 1996 – Launched retail sales on CompUSA.com.
- 1997 – Partners with Apple Computer in a "store within a store" concept for selling Macintosh computers. By January 19, 1998, 57 stores had been built with the remainder to be built by February 1998.
- 1998 – Acquired Tandy's Computer City subsidiary with the help of former CEO Nathan P. Morton.
- 1998 – In May, the company invested in facilities, technology, and expertise to form CompUSA Call Center Services, a division that provided contact center services to OEMs, corporate help desks, software publishers, and cellular service providers.
- 2000 – Became privately held company under Grupo Sanborns, a Mexican retail company as they purchased 85 percent of the company.
- 2001 – In July, CompUSA Call Center Services became The Telvista Company.
- 2003 – Acquired Good Guys.
- 2005 – Converted three CompUSA stores and 13 Good Guys stores into megastores. Closed all 46 Good Guys locations. Began marketing in California and Hawaii as "CompUSA with Good Guys Inside" in response to Best Buy's marketing campaign "with Magnolia Inside".
- 2005 – CompUSA started a customer loyalty program called the CompUSA Network for Business.
- 2006 – CompUSA announced the end of the Network Reward program. All customers were issued coupons for the remaining reward value. They were also offered a refund of the original purchase price in the original form of payment, surrendering remaining points.
- 2006 – Announced the closing of 15 stores across the United States including several locations in California. These stores were being used to liquidate discontinued items from other stores across the nation until the end of October. Roman Ross, a former Philip Morris executive, replaced Tony Weiss as president and CEO after only four months in office. In November, CompUSA launched their new "Home Entertainment" rollout in 40 of its stores, including Puerto Rico, that sold a variety of high definition televisions and home theater equipment. Ross claimed that home entertainment was one of his chief focuses as the new CEO. In September, it was reported that CompUSA's Mexican parent, Grupo Carso, was interested in putting CompUSA up for sale.
- 2007 – The company announced the closing and liquidation of 126 stores due to the "need to close and sell stores with low performance or non strategic, old store layouts and locations faced with market saturation," according to CEO Roman Ross. The realignment included a $440 million cash infusion, store closures, major expense reductions, and a corporate restructuring.
- 2007 – On May 14, CompUSA finalizes the first round of store closures as liquidation sales end.
- 2007 – On December 7, CompUSA was acquired by Specialty Equity, an affiliate of Gordon Brothers Group, as discussions led to the agreement on store sales and closeouts for the remaining 103 stores.
- 2008 – On January 6, Systemax Inc. announced an agreement on the acquisition of the CompUSA brand, trademarks, e-commerce business, and as many as 16 CompUSA retail outlets in Florida, Texas, and Puerto Rico.
- 2008 – On March 2, CompUSA finalizes the round of store closures that started on Dec 7. AT&T Consumer Home Services agrees in principle to purchase the TechPro group for an unstated amount.
- 2008 – On March 21, CompUSA announces that 12 CompUSA stores are open to the public.
- 2008 – On October 1, CompUSA announces a new strategy called 'Retail 2.0' which integrates Internet shopping convenience throughout retail stores. Concept store debuts to public at Dadeland Miami, Florida location.

== Closings and sale to Systemax ==
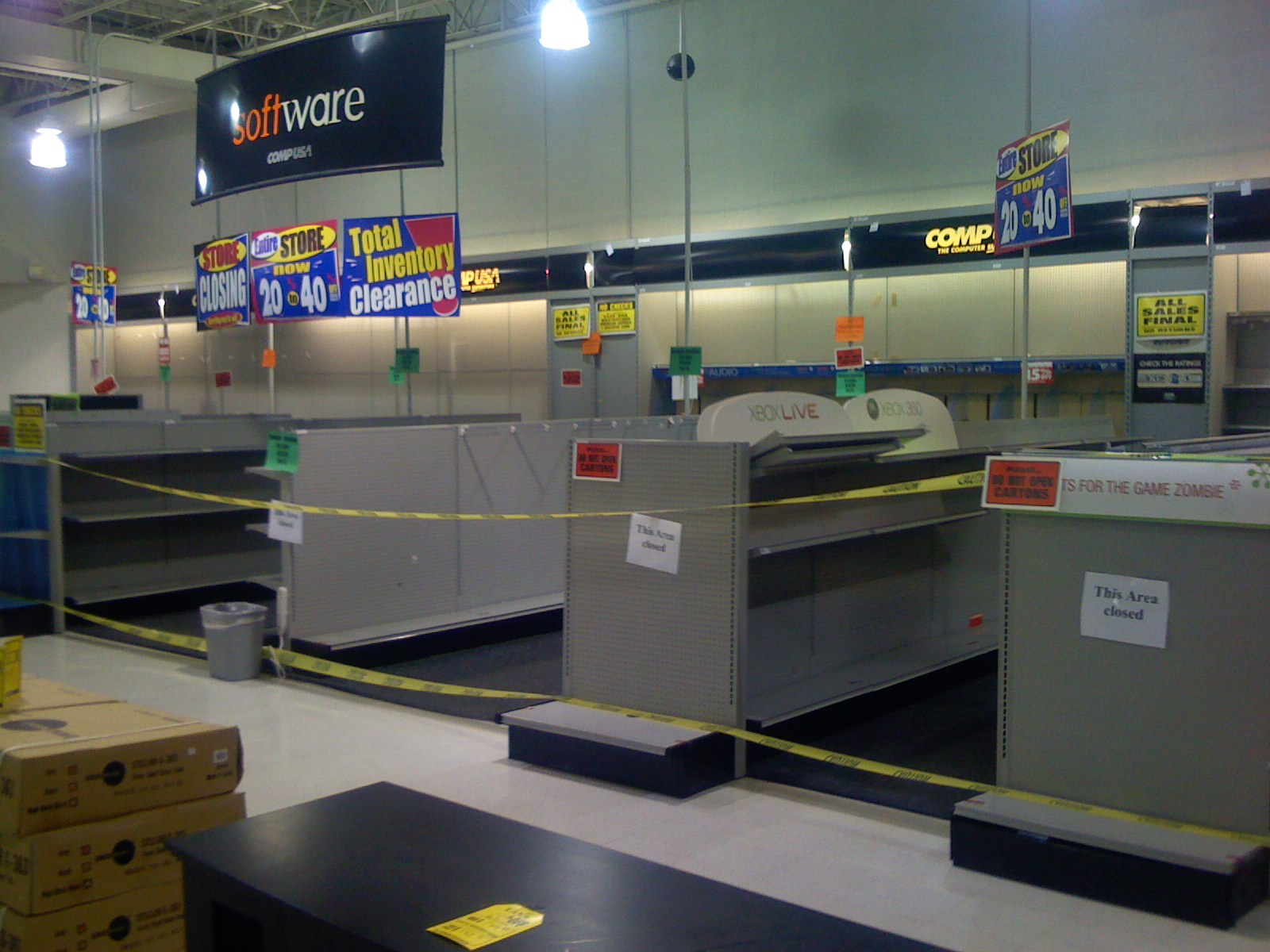
Typical CompUSA store under liquidation

On or immediately before February 28, 2007, CompUSA retained the services of Gordon Brothers, a company that specializes in asset recovery and restructuring, for the purposes of closing 126 stores nationwide. The closing locations were chosen based upon their overall performance, profitability, and proximity to competitors such as Best Buy, Fry's Electronics, Micro Center, and Circuit City. This first round of closings reduced the number of stores to less than half of its previous number.

During the liquidation process, the stores typically offered discounts starting at 5 to 30 percent off of retail prices, ending at up to 95 percent. Liquidation was completed on May 14, 2007.

On December 7, 2007, CompUSA was sold to Specialty Equity, an affiliate of Gordon Brothers Group.

On January 6, 2008, a month after CompUSA was sold to liquidators, Systemax, Inc. (TigerDirect's then-parent company) announced its purchase of 16 CompUSA locations as well as the brand, trademarks, e-commerce business, and technical services.

Systemax also had announced that the eleven existing and three TigerDirect-branded retail stores that were under construction would be converted to the CompUSA brand over the spring of 2008.

On November 2, 2012, it was announced that Systemax would drop both the CompUSA and Circuit City storefront brands by consolidating them under the TigerDirect brand and website. That officially marked the end of the heritage CompUSA brand name as used by Systemax. Customers of both businesses were informed via e-mail on November 7, 2012.

== See also ==
- The Good Guys!
- Circuit City
- Egghead Software
- Fry's Electronics
- Micro Center
- Tower Records
