= Sanyo PHC-10 =

Battery-operated microcomputer produced by Sanyo

PHC-10
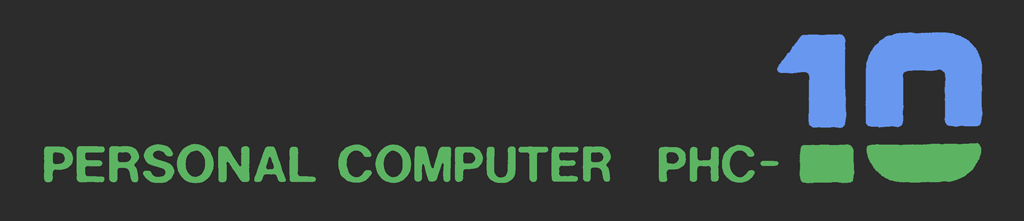
- Manufacturer: Sanyo
- Product family: Sanyo PHC-10, PHC-20 and PHC-25 family
- Type: Training/home computer
- Released: 1982
- Introductory price: ¥24,800 - 1982 (Japan) £60 - 1982/83 (Cancelled UK launch)
- Media: None (no support for non-volatile storage)
- System on a chip: NEC μPD7901G
- Memory: 2 kB (expandable to 4kB)
- Display: Single-line 16-character LCD
- Sound: Via 'BEEP' command
- Input: Keyboard (56 keys)
- Power: 0.05 W, battery only
- Dimensions: 51 x 160 x 300 mm
- Weight: 620g
- Marketing target: Training/educational
- Related: Sanyo PHC-20 and 25
- Language: Tiny BASIC

The Sanyo PHC-10 is a small, battery-operated microcomputer produced by Sanyo. It was announced in mid-1982 alongside the similarly-styled PHC-20 and PHC-25 and is the cheapest and most basic model of the three.

== Technical details ==
The PHC-10 is a basic battery-operated training machine with an inbuilt single-line 16-character LCD display and a limited integer-only implementation of BASIC (Tiny BASIC). It includes 4 kB of ROM (within the CPU), 2 kB of RAM expandable to 4 kB and 56 keys.

It shares the same basic dimensions (51 x 160 x 300 mm) as the PHC-20 and PHC-25 along with similar styling.

The PHC-10 is based around the μPD7901G, a microcontroller introduced by NEC in 1981. The μPD7901G integrates ROM storage (for the Tiny BASIC implementation) and 128 bytes of RAM and interfaces directly with a keyboard, such that it only requires the further addition of an LCD controller and external RAM to turn it into a pocket computer.

The PHC-10 includes no external outputs whatsoever, omitting any form of external TV or video display signal. It also lacks the ability to save programs to cassette or in any other manner, meaning they will be lost when its batteries expire.

== Reception ==
Shortly before the PHC-10's planned (but later-abandoned) UK launch, Your Computer magazine reviewed it alongside the PHC-25- which it considered more promising and focused primarily on- and the PHC-20.

While the review praised the keyboard and ergonomics that the PHC-10 had in common with the other models, it was highly critical of its limitations, particularly the Tiny BASIC implementation and a lack of user RAM which it thought would be "restrictive even for a beginner". The lack of expandability was also criticised, and the PHC-10 was considered "purely a training device" and outclassed by the likes of the Sinclair ZX81.

L'Ordinateur de poche magazine, reporting on the Tokyo Computer Show, was positive towards the PHC-10 which it viewed solely as a beginners' machine. It considered the large keys well-suited to beginners and thought the PHC-10 well-designed with good aesthetics. (Note: While L'Ordinateur de poche was a French-based publication, its report discusses the PHC-10 in the context of the Tokyo show (and its price on the Japanese market) and makes no comment either way about the existence or absence of any potential launch in France.)

== Availability and distribution ==
Doubt had been expressed as to whether the PHC-10 ever made it to market at all. However, advertisements featuring clearance or secondhand examples appeared in Japanese publications as late as 1986 and, as of January 2025, there were at least two examples known to exist.

In the UK, Sanyo announced that the PHC-10 would go on sale for £60 in early 1983, alongside the PHC-20 and PHC-25. However, Your Computer magazine- which had reviewed all three in October 1982- later noted they had "disappeared again in November" with no indication given that they ever went on sale there.

Sanyo did not attempt to market the PHC-10 in the United States (unlike the PHC-20 and PHC-25 which they announced there but later withdrew before they went on sale). Although it was exhibited at the US-based CES show in January 1983, it was reported that the PHC-10 wasn't intended for sale in that country and no US price was given.
