= Sanyo PHC-25 =

Home computer sold by the Japanese company Sanyo from 1982

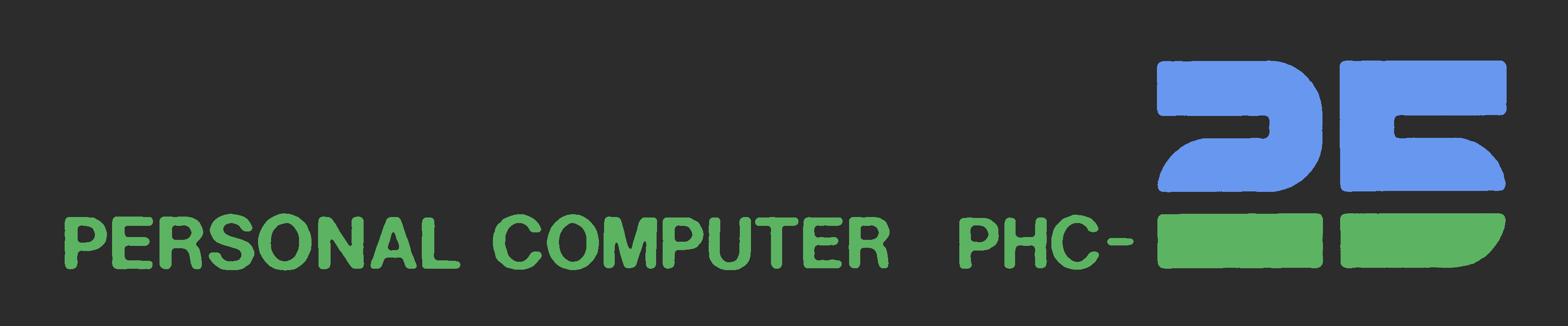
- Manufacturer: Sanyo
- Product family: Sanyo PHC-10, PHC-20 and PHC-25 family
- Type: Home computer
- Released: 1982; 44 years ago
- Introductory price: ¥69,800 (Japan, 1982); 2200 F inclusive (Note: Price given in launch report/announcement) (France, 1983) £150 (UK, 1982/83 - Launch cancelled) $199 (US, 1983 - Launch cancelled)
- Operating system: Sanyo BASIC V1.3
- CPU: NEC D780C @ 4 MHz (Z80-compatible)
- Memory: 16KB RAM, 6KB VRAM, 24KB ROM
- Display: 16 x 16 / 32 x 16 text; 64 x 48 (8 colors) / 128 x 192 (4 colors) / 256 x 192 (2 colors) graphics
- Graphics: Motorola 6847
- Sound: Optional (PSG-01 extension)
- Input: Keyboard (65 keys)

The Sanyo PHC-25 is a home computer released in Japan in 1982 by the electronics company Sanyo. PHC is an acronym for Personal Home Computer.

It is grouped with the lower-end PHC-10 and PHC-20 models which were announced at the same time, and with which it shares the same dimensions and styling.

The PHC-25 came with Sanyo Basic v1.3, an eighty instruction BASIC dialect. A few emulators exist for this system.

== Distribution, marketing and reception ==
=== Japan ===
The PHC-25 was announced in Japan in mid-1982 with a price of ¥69,800.

=== France ===
The PHC-25 was announced in the French press alongside the PHC-20 and PHC-8000 in late 1982 for a planned launch in November or December to January at a price of 2200 FF.

There were complaints about the lack of software availability for the PHC-25. (In response to one of these, the magazine Votre Ordinateur estimated that there would have been around fifty software cassettes available in France circa early 1984.)

As of January 1984, (Note: Cover date of magazine; publication date was likely late 1983) Sanyo was still promoting the PHC-25 in France, with "planned extensions" including an 8K RAM expansion and floppy disk drives.

The PHC-28- which launched later that same year- was seen by Votre Ordinateur, as a replacement for the PHC-25, noting that its MSX compatibility would be a "guarantee of security for fans of the brand" who had complained about the PHC-25's lack of software.

The PHC-25 was used for some educational courses in France.

=== Cancelled launches ===
==== United Kingdom ====
It was announced in late 1982 that the PHC-25 would launch in the UK for £150 in January 1983, alongside the PHC-10 and PHC-20.

However, while all three made it as far as being reviewed in Your Computer magazine in October, the same publication later reported that they had "disappeared again in November", and there was no further sign of them on the UK market.

==== United States ====
The PHC-25 was presented in the US at the 1983 CES with a planned price of $199. However, Sanyo later decided against selling the PHC-25 there due to cutthroat price competition in the low-end US computer market at the time.

== Technical specifications ==
The PHC-25 had the following technical specifications:

- CPU: NEC D780C @ 4 MHz (compatible Zilog Z80A)
- Memory: 22 kB total RAM (16 kB user RAM plus 6 kB VRAM), 24K ROM
- Keyboard: 65 keys, 4 function keys, 4 arrow keys
- Graphics: Motorola 6847, 16 x 16 / 32 x 16 text; 64 x 48 (8 colors) / 128 x 192 (4 colors) / 256 x 192 (2 colors) graphics
- Sound: Optional (PSG-01 extension)
- I/O Ports:

- Cassette tape connector (DIN-8)
- Printer port (IEEE 1284/'Centronics')
- Video output: DIN-8 RGB video out, composite video out
- Expansion port

=== Character set ===
The PCH-25 character generator offered a different character set to the default Motorola 6847 character set:

	0	1	2	3	4	5	6	7	8	9	A	B	C	D	E	F
1	π	┴	┬	┤	├	┼	│	─	┌	┐	└	┘	╳			
2		!	"	#	$	%	&	'	(	)	*	+	,	-	.	/
3	0	1	2	3	4	5	6	7	8	9	:	;	<	=	>	?
4	@	A	B	C	D	E	F	G	H	I	J	K	L	M	N	O
5	P	Q	R	S	T	U	V	W	X	Y	Z	[	\	]	^	_
6		a	b	c	d	e	f	g	h	i	j	k	l	m	n	o
7	p	q	r	s	t	u	v	w	x	y	z	{	|	}	~	
8	♠	♥	♣	♦	⚪︎	⬤										

== Games ==
At least twenty games were released commercially for the PHC-25.

Name	Year	Publisher
Alunissage	1983	Sanyo
Attack	1983	Sanyo
Bioastral	1983	Sanyo
Blackjack	1983	Sanyo
Cancer	1983	Sanyo
Crash	1983	Sanyo
Invasion	1983	Sanyo
Jeu de l'espace	1983	Sanyo
Jeu du pendu	1983	Sanyo
Jeux de mots	1983	Sanyo
La guerre du feu	1983	Sanyo
Labyrinthe	1983	Sanyo
Laser	1983	Sanyo
Missile	1983	Sanyo
Morpion	1983	Sanyo
Packman	1983	Sanyo
PMU	1983	Sanyo
Raid aérien	1983	Sanyo
Super Mind	1983	Sanyo
Tirs	1983	Sanyo
