= Sanyo PHC-20 =

Monochrome home computer produced by Sanyo

PHC-20
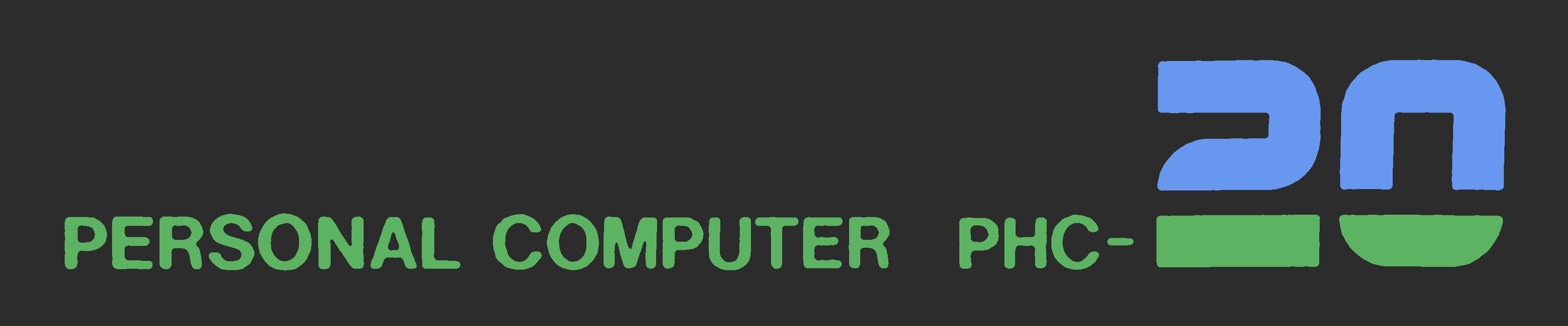
- Manufacturer: Sanyo
- Product family: Sanyo PHC-10, PHC-20 and PHC-25 family
- Type: Home computer
- Released: 1982
- Introductory price: ¥47,800 - 1982 (Japan) £100 - 1982/83 (Cancelled UK launch)
- Media: Audio cassette (via cassette out)
- CPU: Z80A-compatible
- Memory: 4 kB
- Display: Monochrome video out
- Input: Keyboard (56 keys)
- Power: 7W (via AC PSU)
- Dimensions: 51 x 160 x 300 mm
- Weight: 790g
- Marketing target: Home
- Related: Sanyo PHC-10 and 25
- Language: Extended Tiny BASIC

The Sanyo PHC-20 is a home computer released by Sanyo in 1982 and a member of the concurrently-launched Sanyo PHC-10, PHC-20 and PHC-25 family.

The PHC-20 sits between the PHC-10 and PHC-25 in terms of price and capability and features a monochrome display output and a simple, integer-only implementation of BASIC.

== Features and design ==
The PHC-20 is based on a Z80A-compatible CPU and includes 4 kB of RAM and support for monochrome-only video for display on external television or monitor.

In common with the majority of home computers of its era, the PHC-20 features a built-in BASIC interpreter- in this case a limited, integer-only implementation known as Extended Tiny BASIC.

The PHC-20 lacks the printer and expansion ports of the higher-end PHC-25 (with blanking plates on the case where those appear on the latter).

Despite the superficial similarities, the PHC-20 is not merely a cut-down PHC-25. It features an internal design and architecture distinct in several major respects and which was described by emulator developer Toshiya Takeda as "unique" and "completely different" to that of the PHC-25.

== Reception ==
A joint review in the UK-based Your Computer magazine focused mainly on the PHC-25, but devoted a few paragraphs to the PHC-10 and 20. While the PHC-20 was praised for sharing the "same good ergonomics" as its stablemates ("well packaged and [with] comfortable keyboards"), it was considered underspecified for the price and criticised for a lack of printer support and a "severely limited" BASIC.

It concluded that "users can expect new machines to offer more than 3K user RAM, integer Basic and black and white display for £100".

In France, L'Ordinateur individuel magazine considered the PHC-20 less interesting than the PHC-25 (accounting for the 700 F price difference).

== Release, marketing and availability ==
=== Japan ===
The PHC-20 was announced in Japan in mid-1982 alongside both the PHC-10 and PHC-25. A release date of 1 May and a launch price of ¥47,800 were quoted.

=== France ===
Sanyo France announced the PHC-20 (alongside the PHC-25 and PHC-8000) in late 1982 for a price of 1500 F. However, L'Ordinateur individuel magazine- which had itself expressed more interest in the PHC-25- commented that Sanyo France were "showing little enthusiasm for [the PHC-20's] distribution".

While the PHC-25 was later sold in France (Note: Sanyo France continued to promote the PHC-25 for around a year or so after its launch there) it is not clear whether or not the PHC-20 ultimately made it to shops there.

=== United Kingdom ===
In the UK, it was announced that the PHC-20 would launch for £100 in January 1983, alongside the PHC-10 and PHC-25. Your Computer magazine reviewed all three together for the October 1982 issue. However, they later noted that they had all "disappeared again in November" with no indication that they ever reached the UK market.

=== United States ===
In the United States, Sanyo originally intended to sell the PHC-20 for $99 alongside the PHC-25. However, despite advance publicity having already made it into print, they later withdrew both and the PHC-20 never went on sale there.

Sanyo's then marketing manager Ron Milos commented on the affair in early 1984, saying "we had a lot of trouble with that one" and describing the PHC-20 as "nice, but not unique".
