= Sanyo PHC =

Microcomputer series

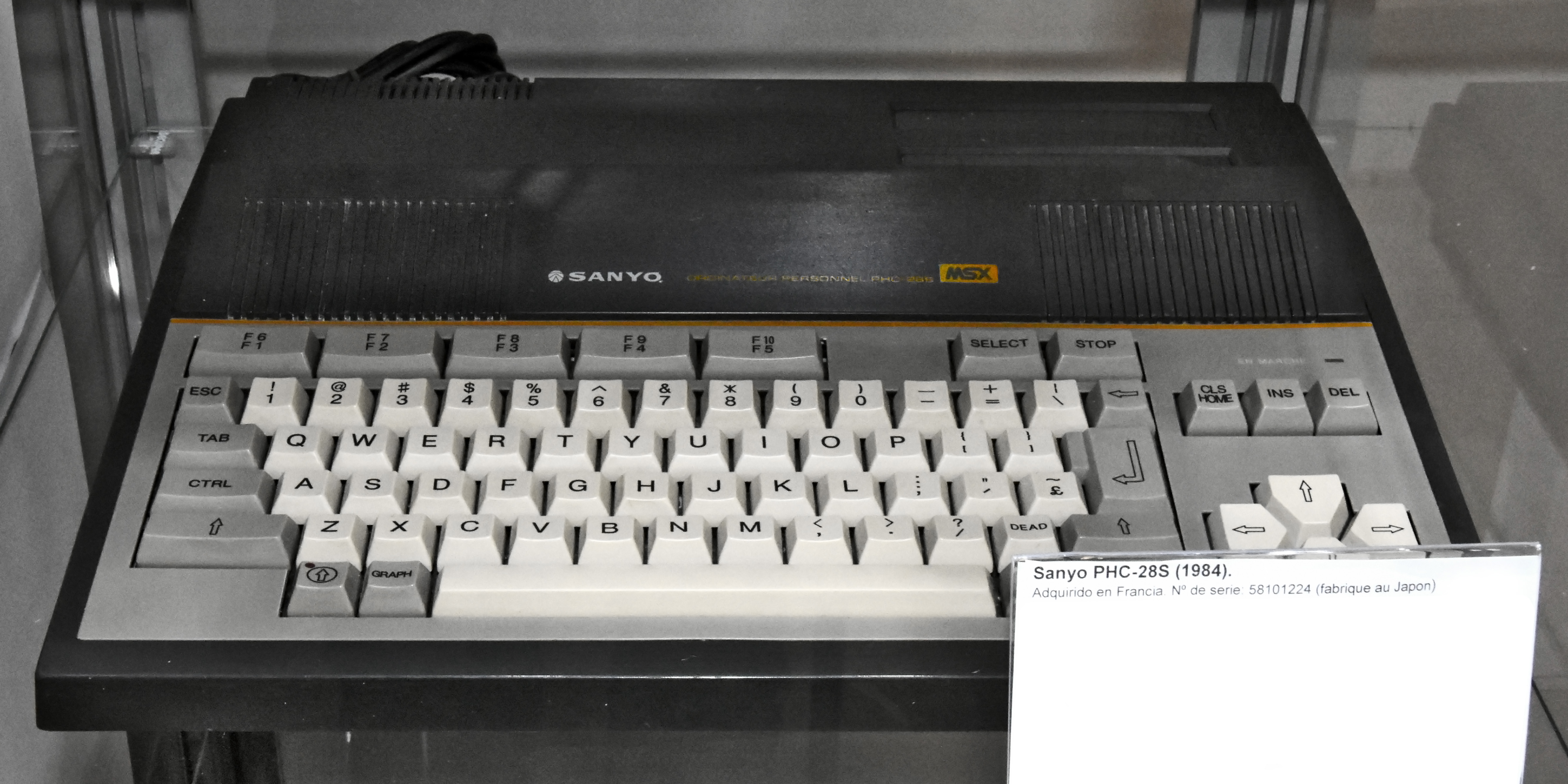
Sanyo PHC-28S, an MSX-compatible model

Sanyo PHC was a brand/prefix used by Sanyo on a number of early microcomputer models released by them during the late 1970s and the 1980s.

Early models in the line include the PHC-1000 and the PHC-10, PHC-20 and PHC-25 family.

Sanyo later used the PHC name on many of its MSX, MSX2 and MSX2+ compatible machines.

== PHC-1000 ==
The Sanyo PHC-1000 was released in 1979 and was marketed towards small businesses as well as the fields of education, hardware control and hobbyist use.

It was an integrated unit, featuring a built-in 12-inch CRT-based display (supporting 80 x 24 characters), cassette-based data recorder and a keyboard (including numeric keypad). It was based around an Intel 8085A CPU and included 32 kB of RAM.

The PHC-1000 was exhibited at the 1980 Microcomputer Show in Heiwajima, Tokyo.

== PHC-10, PHC-20 and PHC-25 ==
The PHC-10, PHC-20 and PHC-25 are a group of low-end home computers announced simultaneously by Sanyo in mid-1982. All shared the same basic dimensions (51 x 160 x 300 mm) and similar styling.

Each model aimed at a distinct market segment, with the technical specification and price increasing from the low-end PHC-10 and the mid-range PHC-20, to the high-end PHC-25 model.

=== Models ===
The PHC-10 is the lowest-priced and most basic model. It is a battery-operated training machine with an inbuilt single-line 16-character LCD display and a limited implementation of BASIC. It lacks any external display support or the ability to load or save programs.

Examples of the PHC-10 are rare, although as of January 2025, there were at least two known to exist.

The PHC-20 is an integer-only model which generates a monochrome-only display signal and was placed between the PHC-10 and PHC-25 in terms of capability and pricing. It is based on a Z80A-compatible CPU and includes 4 kB of RAM.

The PHC-25 was the highest-end model, based on a Z80A-compatible CPU with 16 kB of RAM and supporting colour graphics with various display modes.

=== Release, marketing and availability ===
In Japan, all three models were announced simultaneously in mid-1982 with the PHC-10 and 20 scheduled for release in May (at ¥24,800 and ¥47,800 respectively) and the PHC-25 to follow June (at ¥69,800).

In France, both the PHC-20 and the PHC-25 were announced in late 1982 (alongside the PHC-8000) for planned sale at 1500 F and 2200 F respectively. L'Ordinateur individuel magazine considered the PHC-20 the less interesting of the two and observed that Sanyo France seemed "to be showing little enthusiasm for its distribution". While it is not clear whether the launch of the PHC-20 went ahead in France, Sanyo sold and continued to promote the PHC-25 there until at least late 1983/early 1984.

In the UK, it had been announced that all three would launch in January 1983, with prices set at £60 (PHC-10), £100 (PHC-20) and £150 (PHC-25). They were all reviewed by Your Computer magazine in October 1982, but a later issue noted they had all "disappeared again in November" and there is no indication that they reached the UK market.

Sanyo had planned to market the PHC-20 and PHC-25 in the United States, and advance reports appeared in the press there. However, they later reversed the decision in both cases- the PHC-20 was withdrawn before it reached dealer shelves and they similarly decided against launching the PHC-25 there due to cutthroat competition in the low-end market. (The PHC-10 was never intended for release in the US, although it had been exhibited at the January 1983 CES show with that proviso.)

== MSX-compatible PHC models ==
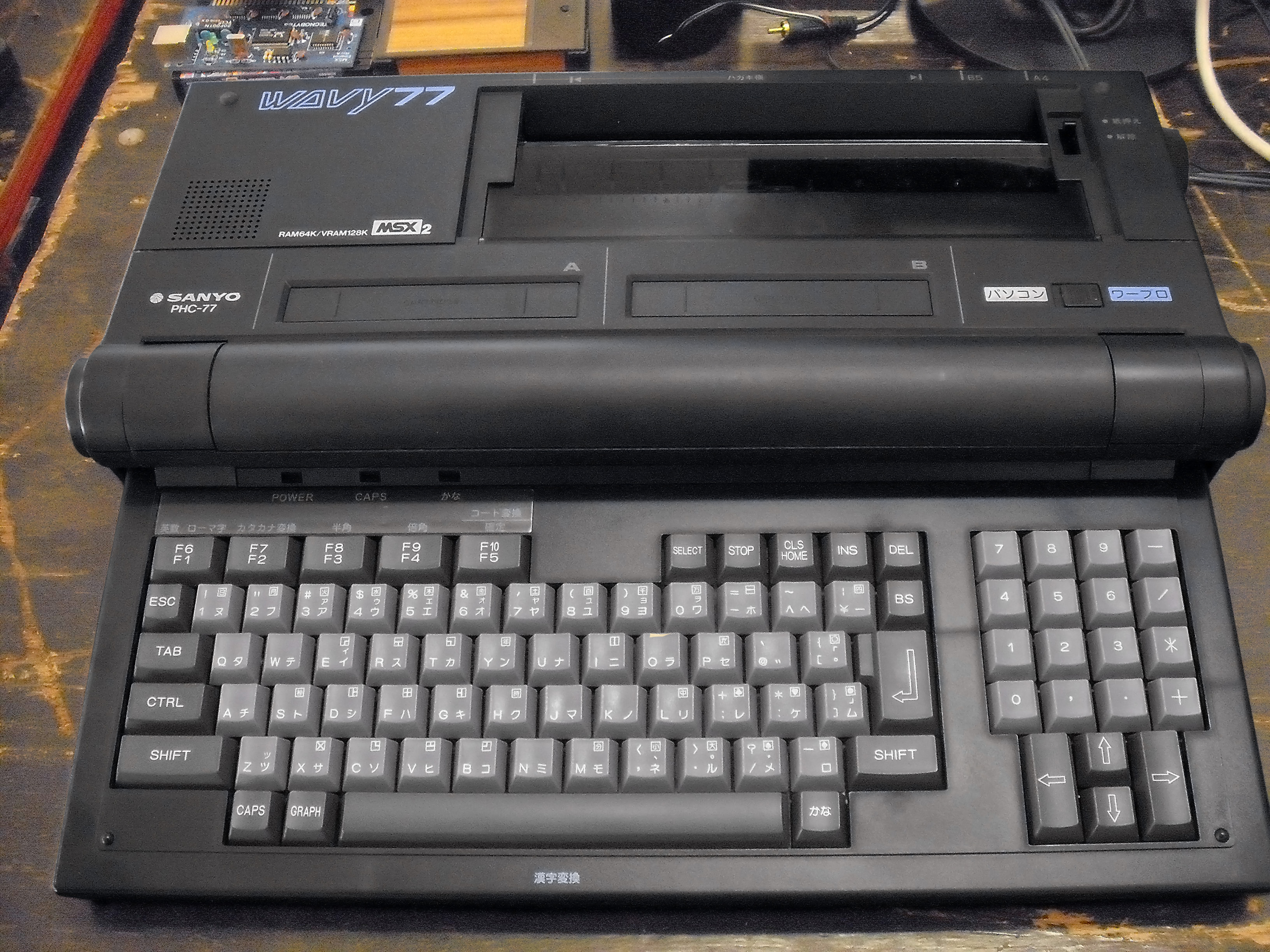
Sanyo PHC-77, an MSX2-compatible model

Sanyo later became a supporter of the MSX standard. It used the PHC name on a number of MSX (e.g. PHC-30N), MSX2 (e.g. PHC-77) and MSX2+-compatible machines (e.g. PHC-70FD).

Other MSX-compatible models included the PHC-23, PHC-25SK, PHC-27, PHC-28, PHC-30, PHC-33, PHC-35J, PHC-50FD2, PHC-55FD2, PHC-70FD, PHC-70FD2 and PHC-77.
