= Sanyo Katana =

2006 mobile phone

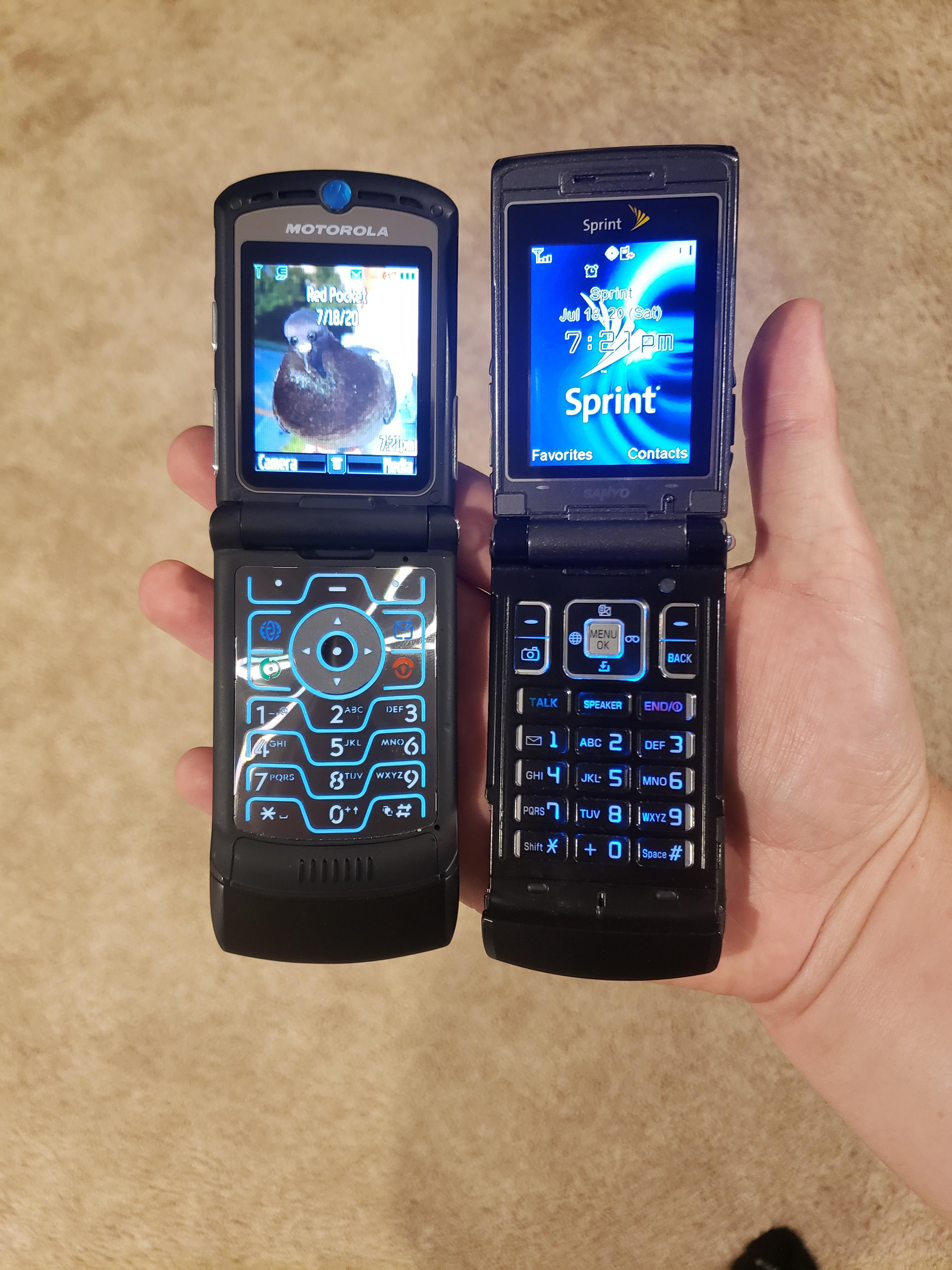
- Sanyo Katana (on the right) next to a Motorola Razr V3
- Manufacturer: Sanyo
- Series: Katana
- First released: July 5, 2006; 20 years ago
- Successor: Katana II, Katana DLX, Katana LX, Katana Eclipse
- Form factor: Clamshell
- Colors: Mystic Black; Blue Sapphire; Cherry Blossom Pink; Polar White
- Dimensions: 3.88 x 2.02 x 0.58 in 99 x 51 x 14.7 mm
- Weight: 3.4 oz (96 g)
- Operating system: Proprietary
- Removable storage: Non-expandable storage
- SIM: No SIM card, this was a CDMA-only phone
- Battery: 3.7 V
- Charging: Proprietary
- Rear camera: 0.3 MP (VGA)
- Front camera: None
- Display: 2.2 in (56 mm) diagonal TFT LCD; 320x240 px QVGA; 65K colors
- External display: 1 in (25 mm) diagonal TFT LCD; 64x96 px 65K colors
- Model: SCP-6600
- Made in: Malaysia

The Katana, or Sanyo SCP-6600, is a clamshell style mobile phone designed by Sanyo. It was released in the United States in the third quarter of 2006. The Katana was an "ultraslim" mobile phone with a design similar to the Motorola Razr V3. It would be followed by the Katana II in 2007 alongside the Katana DLX as a high-end multimedia capable variant of the Katana II. The Katana LX followed in 2008 with a much different design more focused on a unique reflective front hiding a monochrome OLED outer display underneath, followed again by the Katana Eclipse, which combined the looks of the Katana LX with the features of the Katana DLX including a color outer LCD.

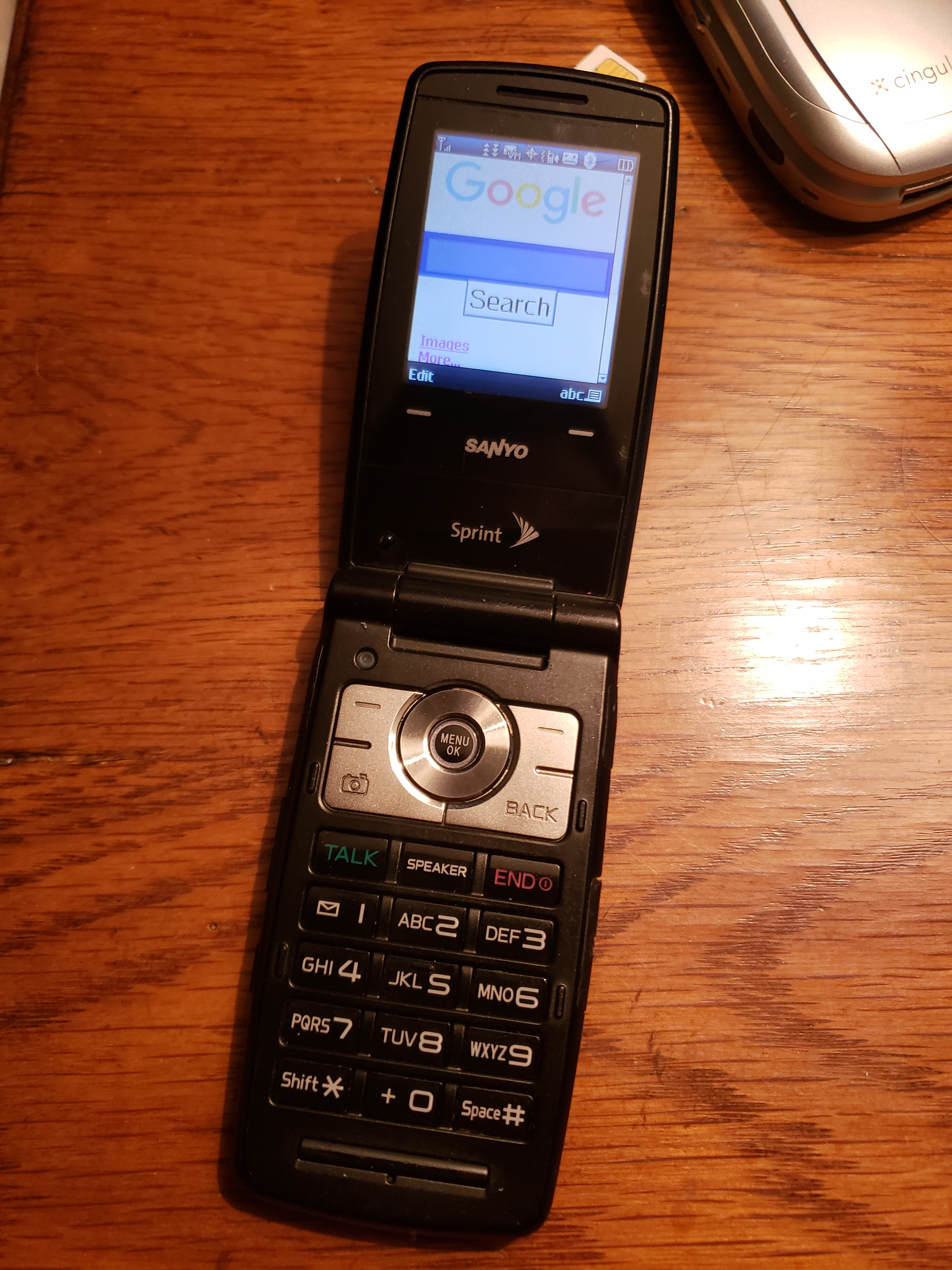
Sanyo Katana Eclipse browsing the internet

== Providers ==
The phone was available in the US through Sprint as well as CREDO Mobile, Qwest, Embarq, Liberty Wireless, and Humane Wireless. The Katana was also available in Canada by Bell Mobility, Sasktel and MTS. The Katana was available in New Zealand by Telecom The Katana was available in India by Reliance sub-sector "A. Bilgi"

== Colors ==
The Sanyo Katana came in four colors, including mystic black, blue sapphire, cherry blossom and polar white, which was available exclusively through RadioShack.

In New Zealand the 'polar white' Katana was sold as "Sanyo ICE," the cherry blossom Katana was sold as "Sanyo Diva," the mystic black as "Sanyo 6600." Blue sapphire was not sold in New Zealand.
