= Xacti =

Digital camera brand

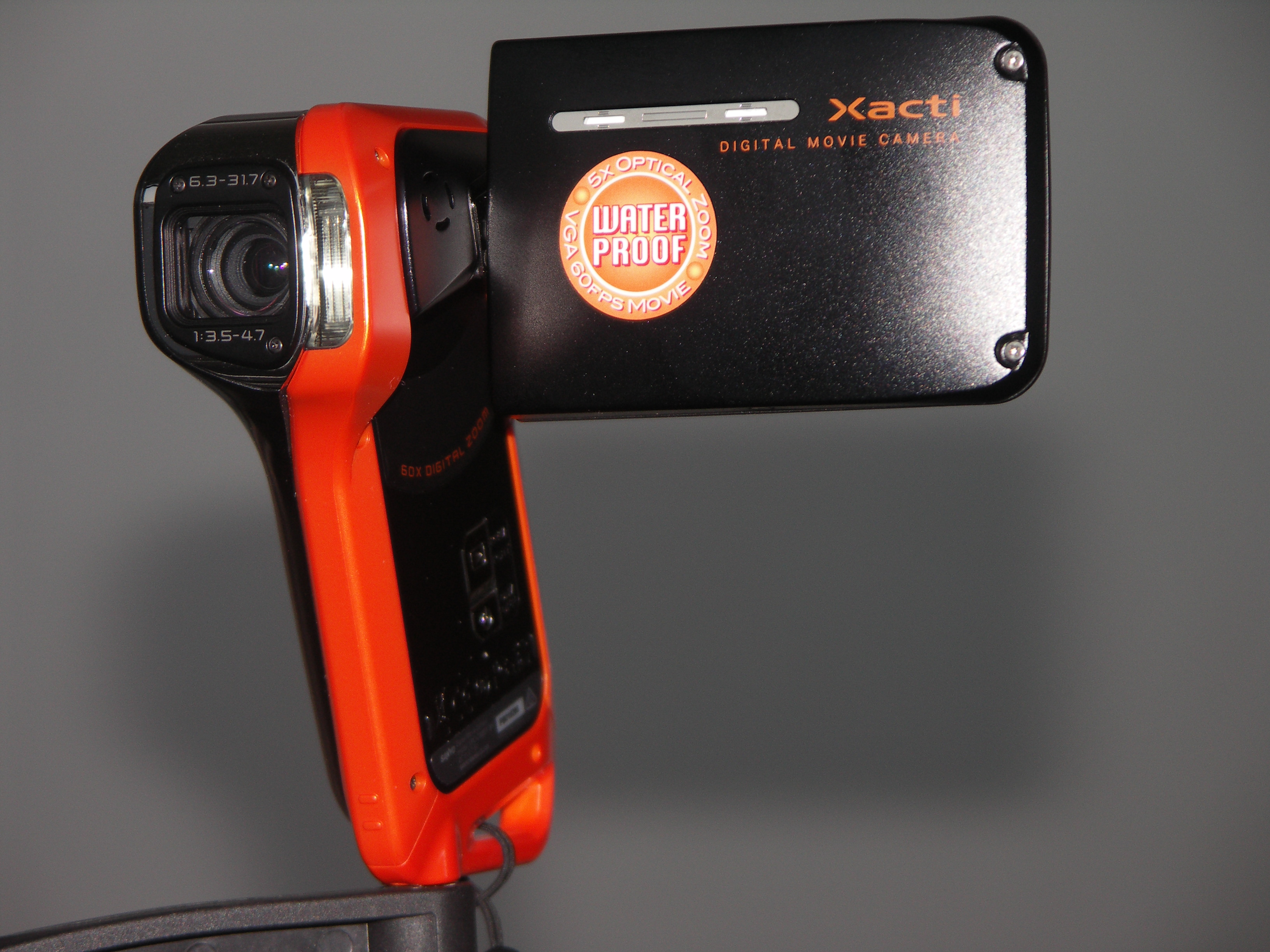
- Product type: Camcorder
- Current owner: Sanyo
- Website: sanyo.com/xacti/english/

Xacti is a brand of Sanyo hybrid digital camera and camcorder. They use a distinct pistol-shaped format with most controls operated by the thumb and able to shoot both video and picture simultaneously. The range of models includes high definition cameras, waterproof cameras and cameras using the H.264 video codec. SANYO DI Solutions Co., Ltd. changed its name to Xacti Corporation in May 2013.

== List of Xacti models ==
- CA100
- CG102
- CG100
- TH1
- SH1
- FH1
- WH1
- HD2000
- HD1010
- HD1000
- HD800
- HD700
- HD2
- HD1a
- HD1
- C40
- CA9
- CA8
- CA65/E1
- CA6
- CG65
- CG21
- CG20
- CG10
- CG9
- CG6
- C6
- C5
- C4
- C1
- VPC-E1
