= Howard Ladd =

Electrical engineer, inventor, marketer, entrepreneur, banker

Howard Philip Ladd
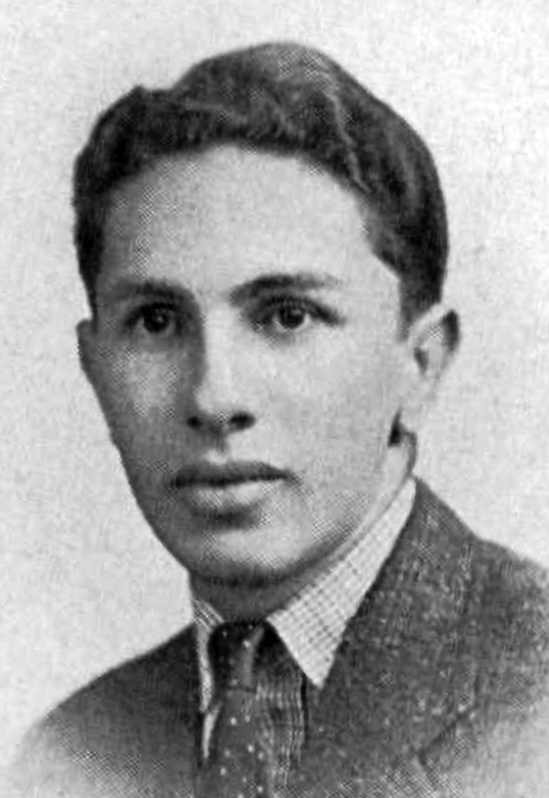
- Born: Howard Philip Ladd; April 5, 1921; Providence, Rhode Island, US
- Died: April 5, 2015 (aged 93); Los Angeles, California, US
- Education: University of Pennsylvania (BSE 1942); Wharton School of Business (MBA)
- Occupations: Electrical engineer; inventor; marketer; entrepreneur; banker

Howard Philip Ladd (April 5, 1921 – April 5, 2015) was an electrical engineer, inventor, marketer, entrepreneur and bank founder. Ladd was a pioneering giant in American and international consumer audio and video electronics.

The founder of Concord Electronics, Ladd was largely responsible for the introduction and acceptance of personal audio and video tape recorders in the US. As executive vice president and COO of the Sanyo Corporation, Ladd managed that brand's highly successful US introduction as well as managing its subsidiary Fisher Electronics.

== Biography ==
Ladd was the first of two sons born to Augusta Gertrude (née Feiner) and David Ladd (Ladezinsky) in Providence, Rhode Island on April 5, 1921. Raised in Philadelphia, Pennsylvania, Ladd died on July 7, 2015, in Los Angeles, California.

=== Family ===
Ladd married Louise F. Lieberman in 1942. He was later married to actress Lara Lindsay.

== Education and military career ==
Ladd attended Overbrook High School and graduated from Germantown High School in 1938, both in Philadelphia, Pennsylvania. Ladd graduated from the University of Pennsylvania in 1942 with a degree in electrical engineering and earned an MBA from the Wharton School of Business.

Howard's prowess as a businessman and interest in technology were further developed during his four years in the U.S. Navy during WWII. Among many engineering projects, he was integrally involved in the development of radio controlled target drone aircraft. Upon his release from active duty, Howard visited Los Angeles and moved there.

== Consumer electronics pioneer ==
The ten years after WWII saw Ladd actively involved in the formation of several businesses including a Southern California toy company. His great interest in technology led him back to electronics, setting him on the path to become a world business leader in the design and manufacturing of consumer and commercial audio and video equipment, including audio receivers, speakers, turntables, video cameras and recorders.

== Concord Electronics ==
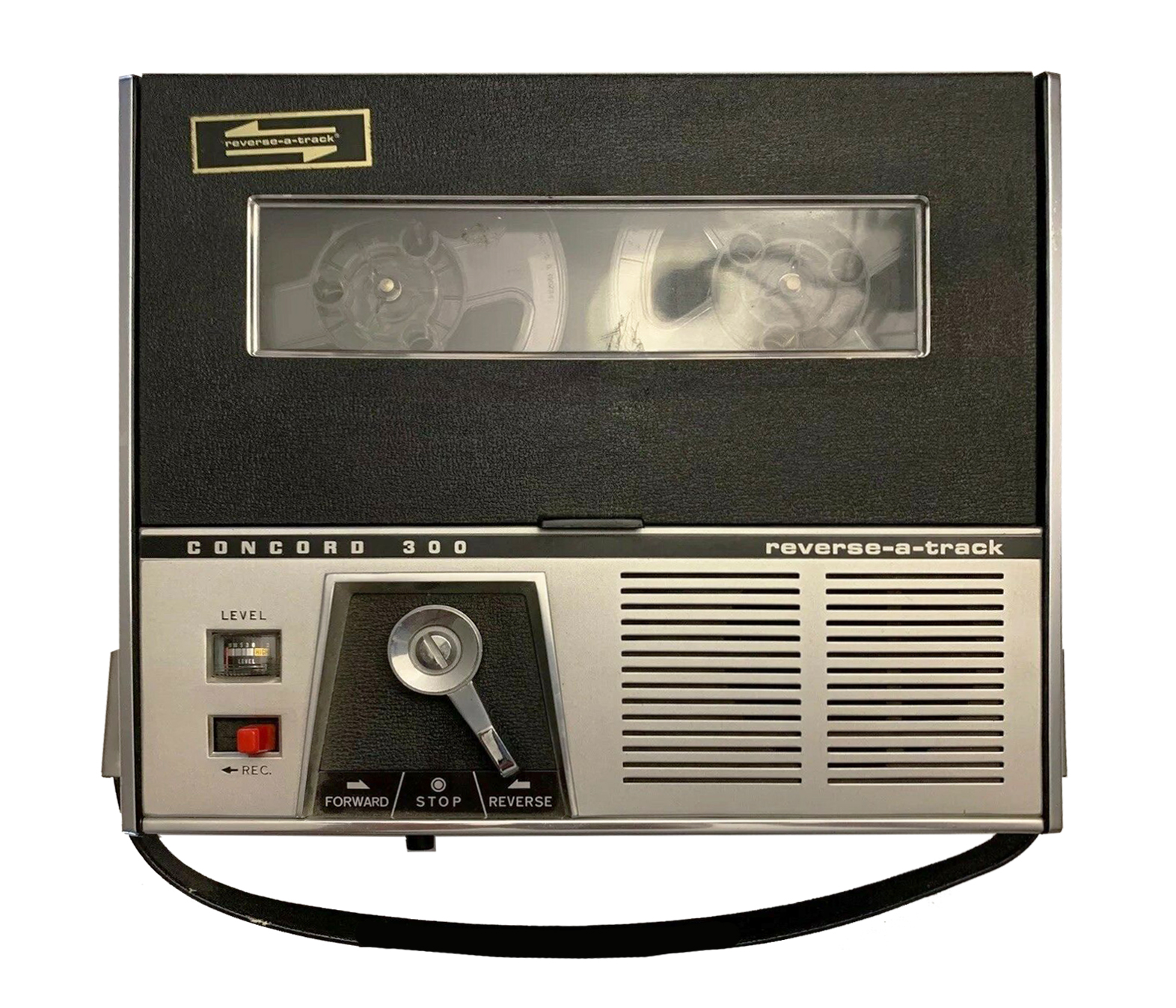
An image of a Concord Electronics D 300 Reel to Reel Reverse-A-Track portable tape recorder, circa 1965

Ladd founded Concord Electronics, initially developing and marketing some of the first reel-to-reel and stereo audio compact cassette tape recorders that were sold in the U.S..

=== Tape recorders ===
Ladd understood the potential appeal of small, personal tape recorders developed by Japanese manufacturers. The first Japanese tape recorders he imported in the 1960s were built by Matsushita and branded "Hosho". One of Hosho's initial investors was actor William Holden. Holden later appeared in print ads for Concord audio equipment.

Ladd's next model, the Hosho 105 tape recorder was sold using both the "Hosho" and "Concord" name. Subsequent models were only branded "Concord". During the 1960s, his Concord 5-inch reel-to-reel recorders were seen as novel and innovative electronic audio equipment. Ladd’s tape recorders became some of the most successful products in the electronics industry at that time.

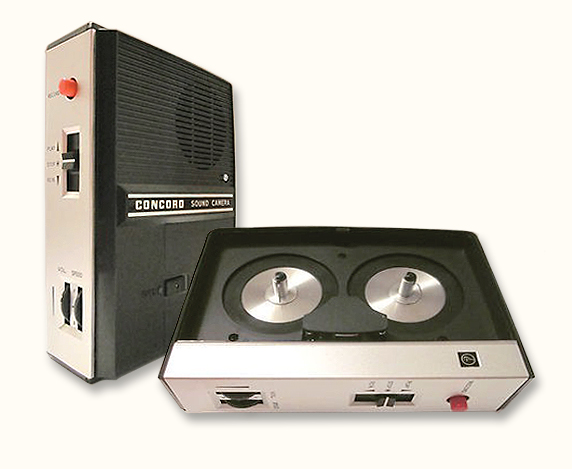
An image of a Concord Electronics F-20 Sound Camera Reel to Reel portable tape recorder, circa 1965

In 1965, Concord offered the Concord F-20 "Sound Camera" tape recorder. The unit used 2.5-inch tape reels with a rim-drive tape transport. It could record 20 to 30 minutes of audio. The F-20 was featured several times during the opening sequence of the Mission Impossible television series between 1966 and 1973.

By 1966, Concord offered 18 different models of reel-to-reel recorders. For the next decade, Concord Electronics continued to innovate consumer recording products including the first portable, battery operated tape recorder with a built-in radio.

Publicity photos show Jimi Hendrix during his arrival and backstage at the June 1967 Monterey International Pop Festival using a Concord 350 5” reel to reel portable tape recorder.

=== Marine Navigation System ===
Concord produced the Conrad NAV-1 Marine Navigation System, licensing the patented process from inventor Daniel Schneiderman. Schneiderman was a Jet Propulsion Laboratory scientist and was project manager of the NASA Mars Mariner and Ranger programs. The device allowed boaters to quickly pinpoint their position and correct compass heading without using math.

=== Early consumer video tape recording ===
Ladd was a pioneer in producing personal video tape recording equipment. In 1966, Concord introduced the VTR-600 video system at the Los Angeles High Fidelity Music Show. The three-piece system included a push-button, helical scan video recording unit, a nine-inch monitor and a Concord video camera. Ladd said the system was designed to meet the needs of professional communicators and wasn't aimed at the home market. The system retailed for $1500 (equivalent to $14,885 in 2025).

=== Concord Electronics sold ===
In 1968, Ladd sold Concord Electronics to the New York based Ehrenreich Photo-Optical Industries, the exclusive US importer of Nikon photographic equipment. The transaction cost Ehrenreich Photo-Optical Industries 44,000 shares of their common shares of stock. Additional payments were to be made "on the basis of future earnings". Ladd remained with Concord as president for a year. Ehrenreich Photo-Optical Industries sold the Concord Electronics brand to Benjamin Electronic Sound Corp., a subsidiary of the New York based Instrument Systems Corporation in 1970.

== Sanyo ==
In 1969 Ladd became the Executive Vice President and COO of the Sanyo Corporation. Ladd introduced the Sanyo brand to the United States in 1970. Under Ladd's leadership, Sanyo introduced both home and automobile audio equipment and other consumer electronics to the North American market. Extensive television advertising helped build the Sanyo brand.

=== Acquired Fisher Electronics Corporation ===
In 1969, Fisher Electronics was acquired by Emerson Electric, who moved Fisher's manufacturing operations to Hong Kong due to high labor costs, but the company continued to suffer quality problems. Fisher's market share continued to drop precipitously. In the early 1970s, Sanyo stepped in, revamping production to increase Fisher product quality. The cooperation between Emerson and Sanyo continued until May 1975, when Sanyo, which still had no American manufacturing affiliate, engineered the transfer of several Fisher product lines to Japan and rehabilitated a Fisher speaker plant at Milroy, Pennsylvania. While 50-50 partners, Sanyo and Emerson were unable to resolve numerous differences of opinion in regard to Fisher.

Finally, Emerson agreed to sell its share in Fisher to Sanyo. Sanyo purchased Fisher Electronics from Emerson in May 1977. Under Ladd’s leadership, the Fisher Corporation under Sanyo grew to be a multi-million dollar leader in the consumer electronics industry. The new, profitable Fisher Corporation moved its headquarters from New York to Ladd's Los Angeles. Ladd was named President and CEO of the combined Sanyo / Fisher Corporation in 1977, serving until 1987.

In 1978, Ladd said his audio merchandising philosophy for Fisher audio equipment was "the right product at the right price at the right time. I know that sounds basic, but that's what we've been able to do". After a "broadening of product and technology philosophies", Ladd predicted "the remarkable turnaround" will see the "privately held subsidiary doing 100 million (equivalent to $493,622,449 in 2025) in annual sales". Ladd was mistaken. The turnaround actually resulted in a return almost ten times greater than his prediction.

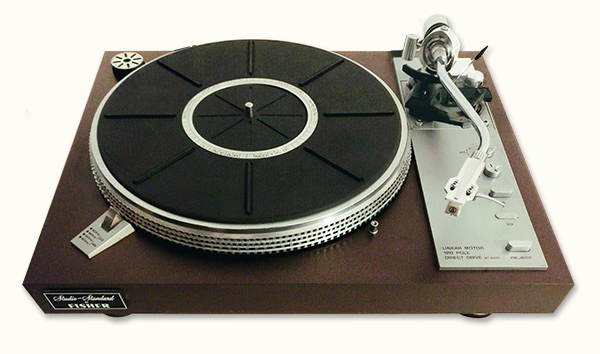
An image of a Fisher MT-6225 Studio Standard Automatic Linear Motor Direct-Drive Turntable, circa 1977.

Ladd's innovations at Fisher included the world's first linear motor, direct-drive turntable, the Fisher MT 6225. Its unique drive system employed the turntable platter as the rotor of the motor. With no electrical connections to the rotor, there were no armature windings and all complicated electronic circuitry was in a stationary (non-moving) position on a single PC board mounted under the platter on the turntable base.

Ladd was instrumental at Sanyo in designing and promoting Fisher Quadraphonic sound audio equipment for the American market, producing 4-channel audio equipment in both SQ and Matrix formats. He said "we make all kinds of quadrasonic equipment because this is the business we're in... let the consumer buy the kind of software he prefers and we'll provide him the hardware to play it on". Ladd directed Sanyo to manufacture special four-channel quadrophonic amplifiers and sent them to major retailers so they could become familiar with quadraphonic sound in their homes and help retailers sell more quadraphonic audio equipment.

Sanyo also realized tremendous growth during Ladd's tenure in the 1970s; annual sales grew from $71.4 million (equivalent to $549,558,473 in 2025) in 1972 to $855 million (equivalent to $4,220,471,939 in 2025) in 1978. During that time, Sanyo had production facilities in a number of countries around the world, including Japan, Hong Kong, Taiwan, Korea, Singapore, Ghana, Brazil, Canada and Los Angeles, California.

Growth in the video sector was slowed by Sanyo's ill-fated decision to adopt Sony's Betamax VCR format instead of Matsushita's VHS. Although initially successful, the Betamax eventually became all but obsolete. Sanyo avoided further damage by later switching to the VHS format.

In 1986, Sanyo's U.S. affiliate merged with Fisher to become Sanyo Fisher (U.S.A.) Corporation (later renamed Sanyo Fisher Company). The mergers made the entire organization more efficient, but also resulted in the departure of certain key executives, including Ladd, who had first introduced the Sanyo name to the United States in the early 1970s. In 1988, Sanyo created Sanyo North America Corporation, with 24 subsidiaries and affiliates..

=== Concord Electronics mobile audio equipment ===
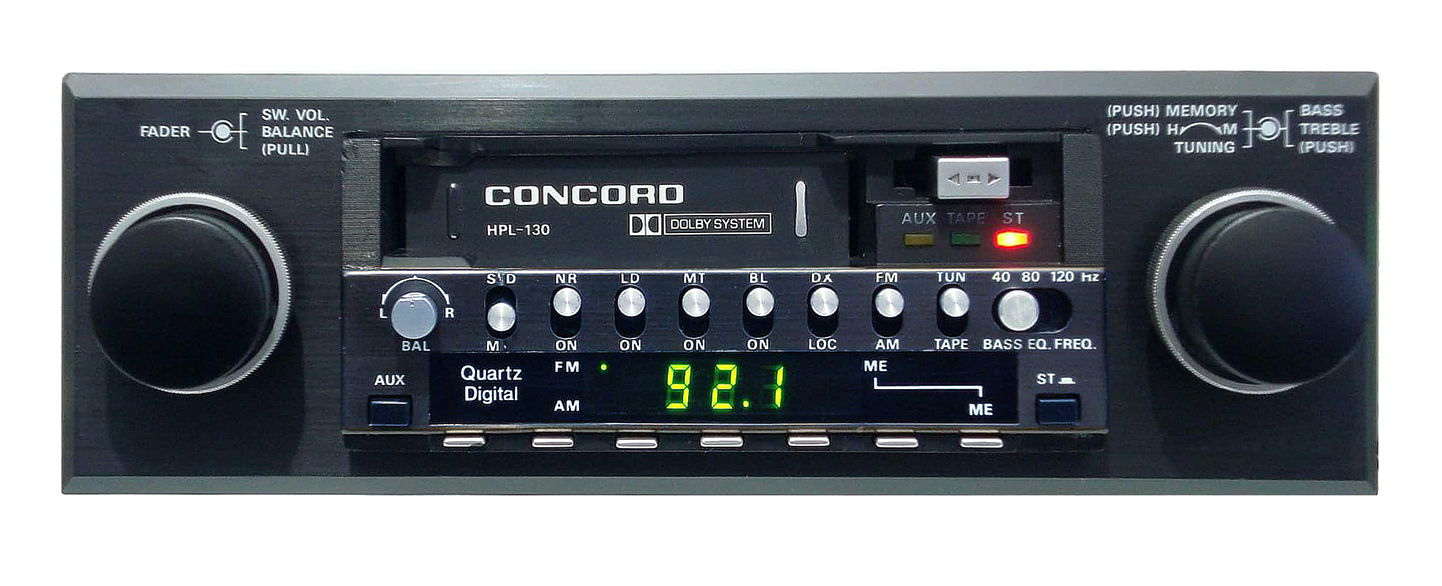
Concord HPL-130 automobile in-dash audio cassette receiver faceplate

In 1975, Ladd incorporated the Westland International Corporation in Tarzana, California, doing business as Concord Electronics. The company sold stereo radio receivers and cassette tape players for automobiles under the brand names "Concord" and "Westport Labs". Its manufacturing plants were in Tarzana, California, and Yamatoshi, Japan. The Concord Electronics brand name was trademarked in 1980.

Concord mobile audio equipment quickly became one of the leading sellers of high-end, in-dash automobile cassette deck receivers, amplifiers and accessories. The 1982 Concord HPL-130 pioneered the use of Sendust tape playback heads, dbx noise reduction circuitry as well as Dolby noise reduction circuitry, four-gang quartz digital tuning and an audio reproduction range of 30-20,000 Hz, at less than 0.08% distortion, rivaling many in-home audio receivers at a retail price of $ 600 (equivalent to $2,002 in 2025). The Concord mobile product lineup included equalizers, amplifiers and external noise-reduction units designed to seamlessly enhance an in-dash unit's performance.

By 1985, Ladd had sold the Concord Electronics mobile audio company to the Penril Corporation in Rockville, Maryland.

=== Active in "retirement" ===
Ladd claimed he had retired in 1988 at age 67, but he continued to stay active in many business opportunities.

Ladd and his associates founded the National Mercantile Bancorp in Century City, California in 1982. Ladd served as Chairman of the Board of Directors and Chief Executive Officer of the company and the bank. Ladd had been a director of the company since 1983 and of the bank since 1982. Ladd owned 1.9% of the bank at the time of acquisition by First California Bank.

In May 1986, Ladd founded Ladd Electronics, incorporating the company in Los Angeles, California. Ladd was granted US utility patent US4912457A for a "Detector and message annunciator device", described as "an apparatus for detecting the presence of people and generating an audio message and/or a video display directed to the person or persons whose presence has been detected".

Projectavision, founded by Eugene Dolgoff in Westbury, New York was an early American producer of high image quality LCD projectors. Ladd joined the executive committee of the company in 1989 to “handle consumer marketing for the firm”.

Ladd founded Concord Media Systems in 1991. That company was the Assignee for US Utility Patent 5355161, an "Identification system for broadcast program segments". The patent has been cited in numerous subsequent patent applications.

Ladd was Chairman of the Board of Concord Technology Development LLC, an information systems company, from 1991 to 1995. In 2004, Ladd launched a subsidiary named "Contek Wholesale". As a division of Concord Technology Development, the business was said to be "a creator of cutting-edge consumer products for home and office". One of the subsidiary's first products was "the world's first bathroom scale with built-in electronic weight control system".

Ladd was an avid tennis player and lover of big band era music.

== Accolades ==
Ladd was inducted into the Consumer Electronics Industry Hall of Fame in October 2006.
