= Your Computer (British magazine) =

British computer magazine (1981–88)

- December 1984 cover
- Categories: Home computing
- Frequency: Monthly
- First issue: 1981
- Final issue Number: 1988; Vol. 8 no. 8/9
- Company: IPC Electrical-Electronic Press
- Country: United Kingdom
- Based in: Sutton, Surrey
- Language: English
- ISSN: 0263-0885

Your Computer was a British computer magazine published monthly from 1981 to 1988 and aimed at the burgeoning home computer market. At one stage it was, in its own words, "Britain's biggest selling home computer magazine". The launch editor was Duncan Scot, who went on to edit Popular Computing Weekly. It offered support across a wide range of computer formats, and included news, type-in programs, and reviews of both software and hardware.

Your Computer covered many of the numerous microcomputers that were released during the peak of the home computer boom in the early-to-mid 1980s and often reviewed multiple new models in a single issue. (For example, the October 1982 issue included the Sanyo PHC-10, 20 and 25, the Commodore 64, the Microprofessor II and the Colour Genie).

== Reviews by issue ==
Hardware reviews by issue
Issue	Date	Computes	Other hardware
Vol 1 No 1	June/July 1981	ZX81, Atari 400/800	
Vol 1 No 2	August/September 1981	VIC-20	
Vol 1 No 3	October 1981	Tandy Color Computer, Tangerine Microtan 65	
Vol 1 No 4	November 1981	TI-99/4	
Vol 1 No 5	December 1981		Sinclair ZX Printer
Vol 2 No 1	January 1982	BBC Micro	
Vol 2 No 6	June 1982	ZX Spectrum	
Vol 2 No 8	August 1982	Dragon 32	
Vol 2 No 10	October 1982	Sanyo PHC-10, PHC-20 and PHC-25 family, Multitech Microprofessor II, EG2000 Colour Genie, Commodore 64	
Vol 2 No 11	November 1982	Jupiter Ace	
Vol 3 No 2	February 1983	Camputers Lynx, Oric-1	
Vol 3 No 4	April 1983	Texet TX-8000	
Vol 3 No 5	May 1983	Compact Computer 40	
Vol 3 No 9	September 1983	Acorn Electron	
Vol 3 No 12	December 1983		Printer review
Vol 4 No 1	January 1984	Dragon 64, Atari 800XL	
Vol 4 No 2	February 1984	Coleco Adam	
Vol 4 No 5	May 1984	Triumph-Adler Alphatronic, Tandy Color Computer 2, Advance 86	
Vol 4 No 6	June 1984	Sinclair QL, Amstrad CPC 464	
Vol 4 No 6	November 1984	MSX, ZX Spectrum+ (in news)	
Vol 5 No 2	February 1985	Enterprise 64	
Vol 5 No 6	June 1985	Amstrad CPC 664, Atari 130XE, Commodore 128	
Vol 5 No 7	July 1985	Atari 520ST, Apricot Computers F1E	
Vol 5 No 9	September 1985	Amstrad CPC 6128	
Vol 5 No 10	October 1985	Amstrad PCW 8256	
Vol 6 No 3	March 1986	BBC Master 128, ZX Spectrum 128	
Vol 6 No 4	April 1986	Atari 1040ST	
Vol 6 No 5	May 1986	Amstrad PCW 8512	
Vol 6 No 9	September 1986	Acorn M19	
Vol 6 No 10	October 1986	Spectrum +2, Amstrad PC1512, Tatung Einstein 256	
Vol 6 No 12	December 1986	Tandy 1000	
Vol 7 No 11	November 1987	Amstrad PCW 9512	
