= Sanyo =

Japanese electronics company

Sanyo Electric Co., Ltd.
- Logo since 1987

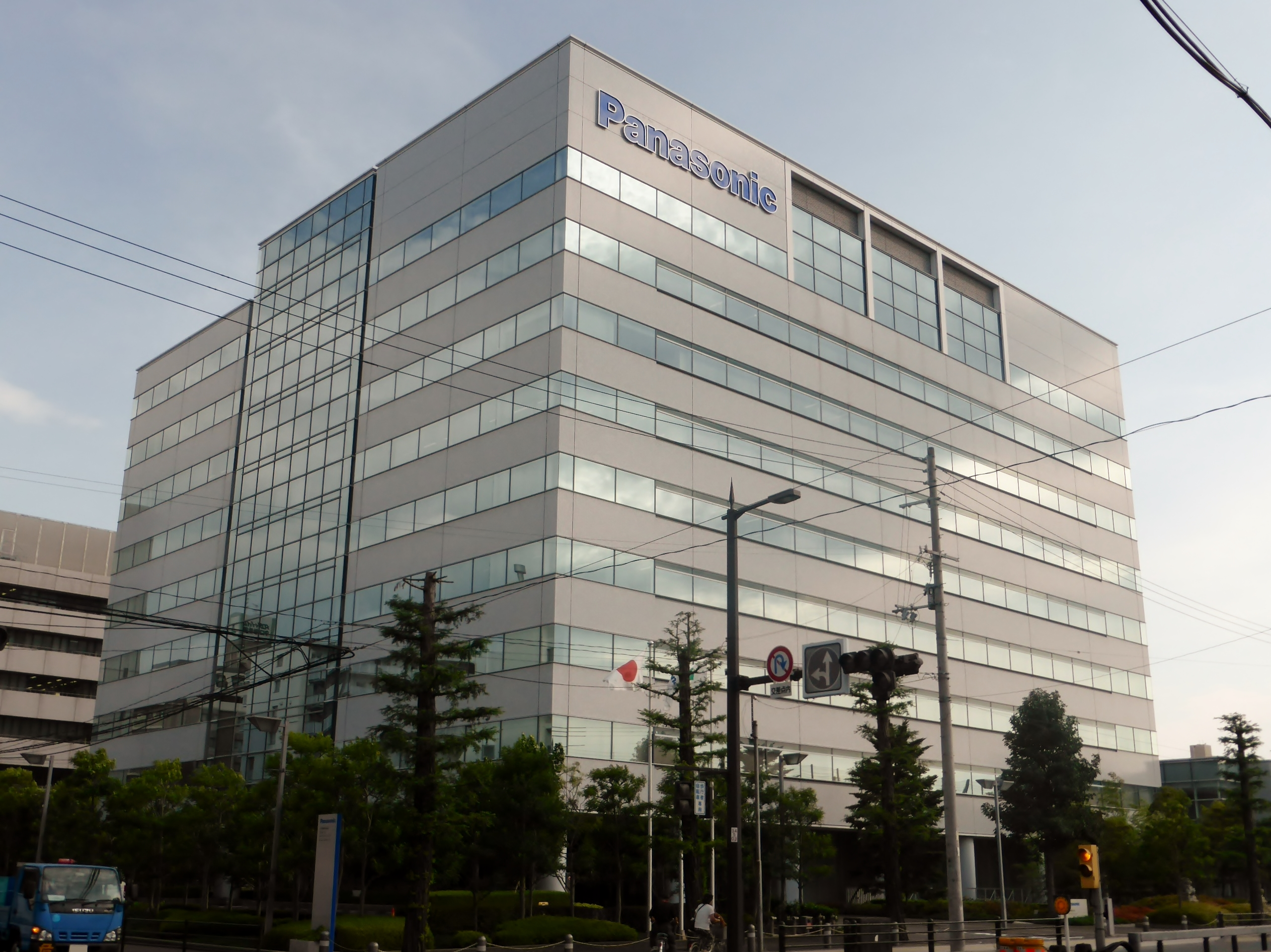
- Former headquarters of Sanyo Electric in Moriguchi, Osaka pictured in January 2012, shortly after the removal of the SANYO logo and replacement by Panasonic
- Native name: 三洋電機株式会社
- Romanized name: San'yō Denki Kabushiki-gaisha
- Type: Subsidiary
- Industry: Electronics
- Founded: 1947; 79 years ago April 1950; 76 years ago (incorporated)
- Founder: Toshio Iue
- Defunct: April 2012
- Fate: Acquired by Panasonic
- Headquarters: 2-1-61 Shiromi, Chūō-ku, Osaka, Osaka Prefecture, Japan
- Area served: Worldwide
- Key people: Seiichirou Igaki (president)
- Products: Consumer electronics; dry batteries; vacuum cleaners; cellular phones; televisions
- Revenue: ▼¥84.678 billion (2018)
- Operating income: ▼¥6.590 billion (2018)
- Net income: ▼¥4.983 billion (2018)
- Total assets: ▼¥106.304 billion (2018)
- Total equity: ▲¥64.832 billion (2018)
- Number of employees: 104,882 (consolidated); 9,504 (non-consolidated) (March 31, 2010)
- Parent: Panasonic
- Website: sanyo-av.com (Audiovisual products, American market only)

Sanyo Electric Co., Ltd. (三洋電機株式会社, San'yō Denki Kabushiki-gaisha) was a Japanese electronics manufacturer that existed independently from 1949 to 2009 and was based in Osaka. It was founded by Toshio Iue, the brother-in-law of Kōnosuke Matsushita, the founder of Matsushita Electric Industrial, now known as Panasonic. Beginning as a producer of bicycle generator lamps, the company went on to launch Japan's first spray-type washing machine in 1953 and in later years became best known for affordable consumer electronics and as a major global leader of batteries, green energy and industrial air systems.

Sanyo at one point focused on solar cell and lithium battery businesses. In 1992, it developed the world's first hybrid solar cell, and in 2002, it had a 41% share of the global lithium-ion battery market. In the 2000s, it was known as one of the 3S along with Sony and Sharp. In its heyday in 2003, Sanyo had sales of about ¥2.5 trillion. However, it fell into a financial crisis as a result of its huge investment in the semiconductor business. In 2009, Sanyo was acquired by Panasonic, and in 2011, its operations were fully consolidated into Panasonic and its brand disappeared. The company now only exists as a legal entity to settle final business obligations. The Sanyo brand continues to exist in some territories for certain products by Panasonic and licensees.

== History ==
=== Beginnings ===
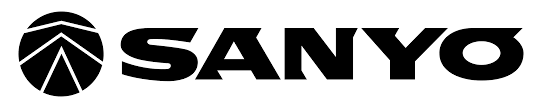
Old logo, used from 1961 to 1987

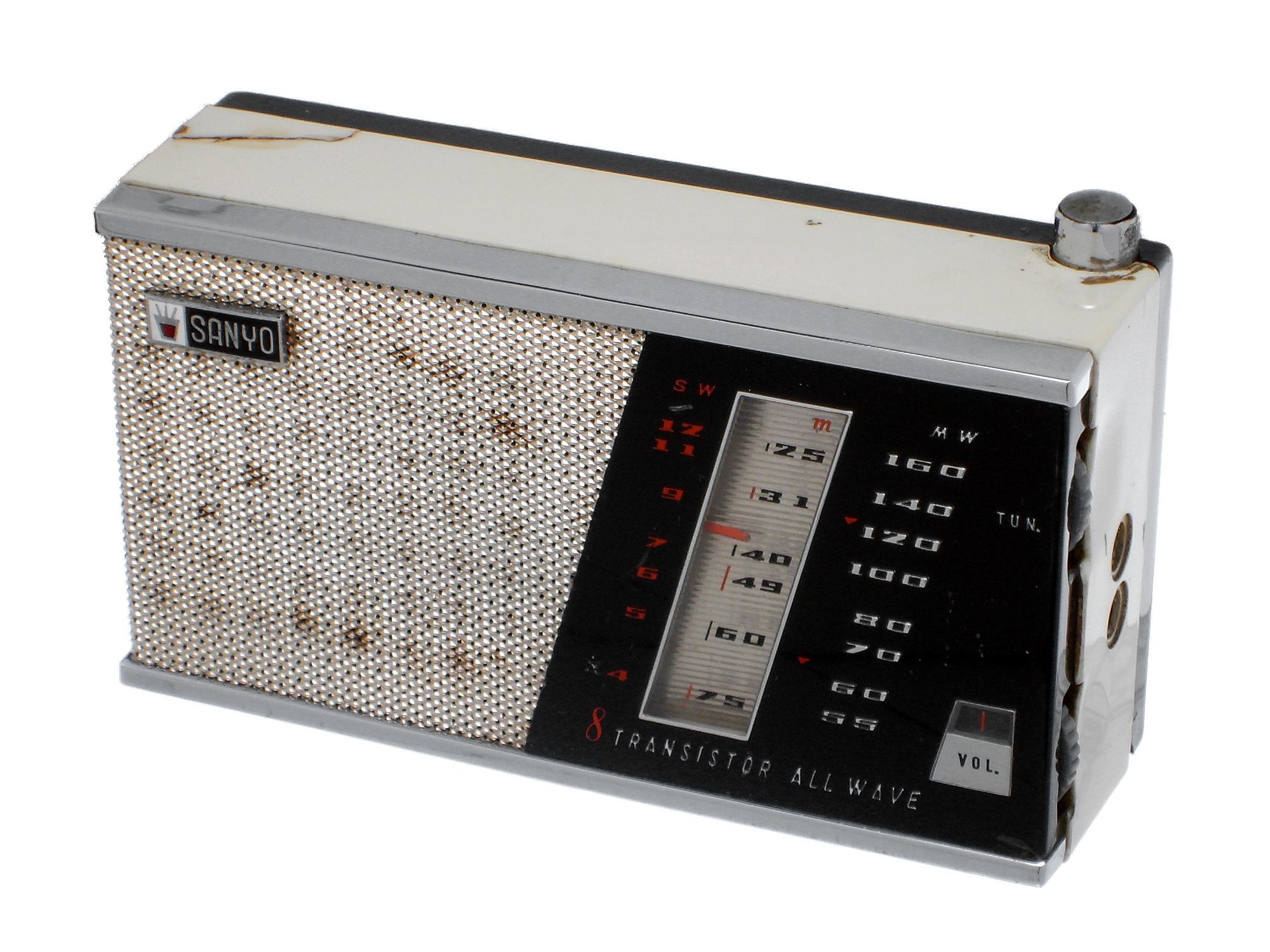
Transistor radio, model 8S-P3, released in 1959

Sanyo was founded when Toshio Iue, the brother-in-law of Konosuke Matsushita and also a former Matsushita employee, was lent an unused Matsushita plant in 1947 and used it to make bicycle generator lamps. Sanyo was incorporated in 1949; it made Japan's first plastic radio in 1952 and Japan's first pulsator-type washing machine in 1954. The company's name means three oceans in Japanese, referring to the founder's ambition to sell their products worldwide, across the Atlantic, Pacific, and Indian oceans.

=== Sanyo in America ===
In 1969, Howard Ladd became the Executive Vice President and COO of Sanyo Corporation. Ladd introduced the Sanyo brand to the United States in 1970. The ambition to sell Sanyo products worldwide was realized in the mid-1970s after Sanyo introduced home audio equipment, car stereos and other consumer electronics to the North American market. The company embarked on a heavy television-based advertising campaign.

Ladd negotiated a purchase of the Fisher Electronics audio equipment manufacturer by Sanyo in May 1975. Under Ladd's leadership, the Fisher Corporation under Sanyo grew to be a multi-million dollar leader in the consumer electronics industry. The new, profitable Fisher Corporation moved its headquarters from New York to Ladd's Los Angeles. Ladd was named president and CEO of the combined Sanyo / Fisher Corporation in 1977, serving until 1987.

Ladd was instrumental at Sanyo in promoting Quadraphonic sound audio equipment for the American market, producing 4-channel audio equipment in both discrete and matrix formats. He said "we make all kinds of quadrasonic equipment because this is the business we're in... let the consumer buy the kind of software he prefers and we'll provide him the hardware to play it on".

Sanyo realized tremendous growth during Ladd's tenure in the 1970s; annual sales grew from $71.4 million (equivalent to $549,558,000 in 2025) in 1972 to $855 million (equivalent to $4.220472×10^{9} in 2025) in 1978.

After a fairly slow selling line in their own V-Cord video format, Sanyo adopted Sony's Betamax video cassette format around 1977 with initial success, including SuperBeta and Beta Hi-Fi models. From around 1984 onwards, production switched entirely to VHS.

In 1976, Sanyo expanded their North American presence with the purchase of Whirlpool Corporation's television business, Warwick Electronics, which manufactured televisions for Sears.

In 1986, Sanyo's U.S. affiliate merged with Fisher to become Sanyo Fisher (U.S.A.) Corporation (later renamed Sanyo Fisher Company). The mergers made the entire organization more efficient, but also resulted in the departure of certain key executives, including Ladd, who had first introduced the Sanyo name to the United States in the early 1970s.

In 1982, Sanyo started selling the MBC-1000 series of CP/M computers. In 1983, it introduced the MBC-550 PC, the lowest-cost IBM PC compatible personal computer available at the time, but its lack of full compatibility hurt Sanyo in the PC marketplace. Sanyo would eventually produce two portable PCS, the MBC-670 mono screen and the MBC-770, the first color portable PC. Unlke the 550, these PCs were 70-90% compatible with the IBM PC.

=== 1990s corporate culture ===
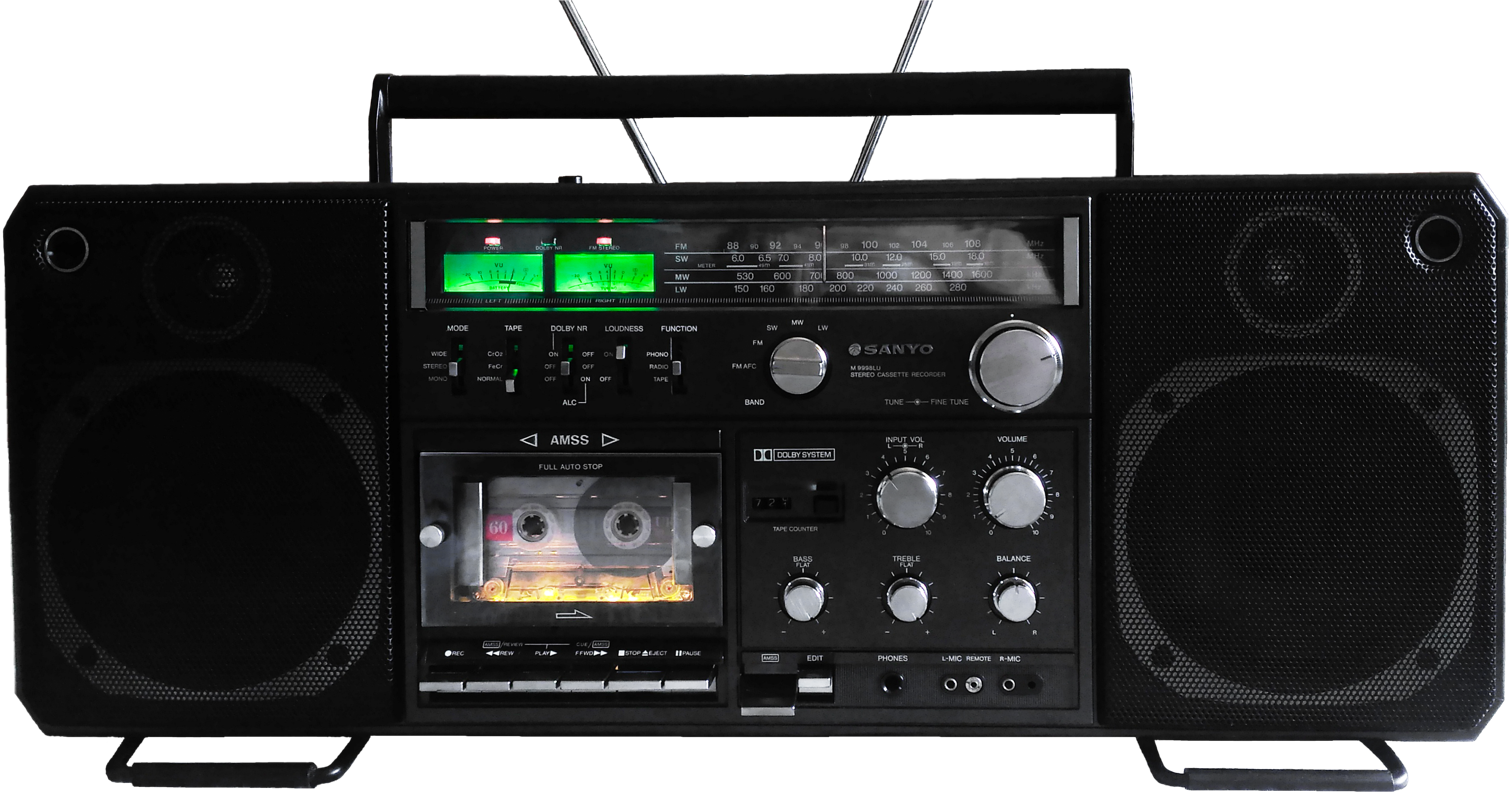
A Sanyo M9998LU Boombox manufactured c. 1979-80 for the European market with user customized dial and tape lights

An article on "Sanyo Style" written in 1992 described that Sanyo utilizes an extensive socialization process for new employees, so that they will be acclimatized to Sanyo's corporate culture. New employees take a five-month course during which they eat together and sleep together in accommodation. They learn everything from basic job requirements to company expectations for personal grooming and the appropriate way in which to dress for their co-workers and superiors.

Technologically, Sanyo has had good ties with Sony, supporting the Betamax video format from invention until the mid-1980s (the best selling video recorder in the UK in 1983 was the Sanyo VTC5000), while producing the VHS video format at the same time for the Fisher brand during the early 1980s, and later being an early adopter of the highly successful Video8 camcorder format. More recently, though, Sanyo decided against supporting Sony's format, the Blu-ray Disc, and instead gave its backing to Toshiba's HD DVD. This was ultimately unsuccessful, however, as Sony's Blu-ray triumphed.

In North America, Sanyo manufactured CDMA cellular phones exclusively for Sprint's Sprint PCS brand in the United States and for Bell Mobility in Canada.

=== Evolution Project era ===
Sanyo's three-year restructuring project

The 2004 Chūetsu earthquake severely damaged Sanyo's semiconductor plant and as a result Sanyo recorded a huge financial loss for that year. The 2005 fiscal year financial results saw a 205 billion yen net income loss. The same year the company announced a restructuring plan called the Sanyo Evolution Project, launching a new corporate vision to make the corporation into an environmental company, plowing investment into strong products like rechargeable batteries, solar photovoltaics, air conditioning, hybrid car batteries and key consumer electronics such as the Xacti camera, projectors and mobile phones.

Sanyo also remains the world number one producer of rechargeable batteries. Recent product innovations in this area include the Eneloop Low self-discharge NiMH battery, a "hybrid" rechargeable NiMH (Nickel-metal hydride battery) which, unlike typical NiMH cells, can be used from-the-package without an initial recharge cycle and retain a charge significantly longer than batteries using standard NiMH battery design. The Eneloop line competes against similar products such as Rayovac's "Hybrid Rechargeable" line.

On November 24, 2006, Sanyo announced heavy losses and job cuts.

Tomoyo Nonaka, a former NHK anchorwoman who was appointed chairwoman of the company, stepped down in March 2007. The President, Toshimasa Iue, also stepped down in April of that year; Seiichiro Sano was appointed to head the company effective April 2007. In October 2007, Sanyo cancelled a 110 billion yen sale of its semiconductor business, blaming the global credit crisis for the decision and stating that after exploring its other options, it had decided to keep the business and develop it as part of its portfolio.

In 2008, Sanyo's mobile phone division was acquired by Kyocera.

=== Acquisition and integration into Panasonic ===
On November 2, 2008, Sanyo and Panasonic announced that they have agreed on the main points of a proposed buyout that would make Sanyo a subsidiary of Panasonic. They became a subsidiary of Panasonic on December 21, 2009.

In 2010, Sanyo sold its semiconductor operations to ON Semiconductor. On July 29, 2010, Panasonic reached an agreement to acquire the remaining shares of Panasonic Electric Works and Sanyo shares for $9.4 billion.

In October 2010, Panasonic announced that it plans to terminate the Sanyo brand in most markets globally. Sanyo delisted from the Tokyo Stock Exchange and NASDAQ on March 29, 2011. In December 2011, work began on removing the SANYO wordmark on its head building to be replaced by Panasonic.

In April 2012, Sanyo's Southeast Asian unit, responsible for the manufacturing of consumer electric appliances in the region, was announced to be formally acquired by Haier.

In August 2013, a 51% majority stake in Chinese company Hefei Royalstar Sanyo, a 2000 joint venture between Sanyo and Chinese government investment company Hefei, was purchased by American multinational manufacturer Whirlpool Corporation for $552 million.

== Energy ==
=== Solar cells and plants ===
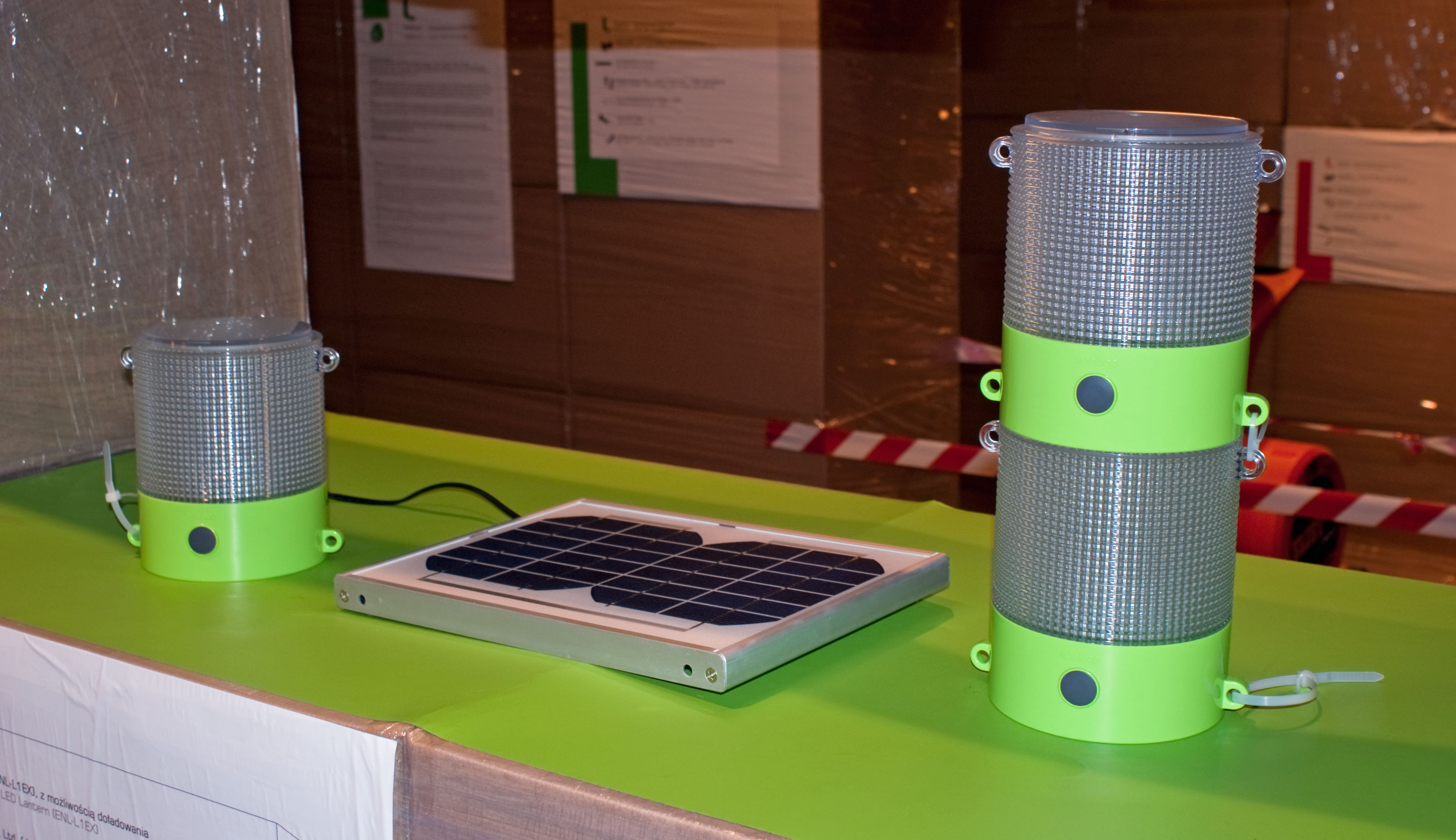
"Eneloop" Rechargeable LED Lantern (ENL-1EX) by Sanyo

The Sanyo HIT (Heterojunction with Intrinsic Thin layer) solar cell is composed of a mono thin crystalline silicon wafer surrounded by ultra-thin amorphous silicon layers.

Sanyo Energy opened its solar module assembly plants in Hungary and in Mexico in 2004, and in 2006 it produced solar modules worth $213 million. In 2007, Sanyo completed a new unit at its solar module plant in Hungary that was to triple its annual capacity to 720,000 units in 2008.

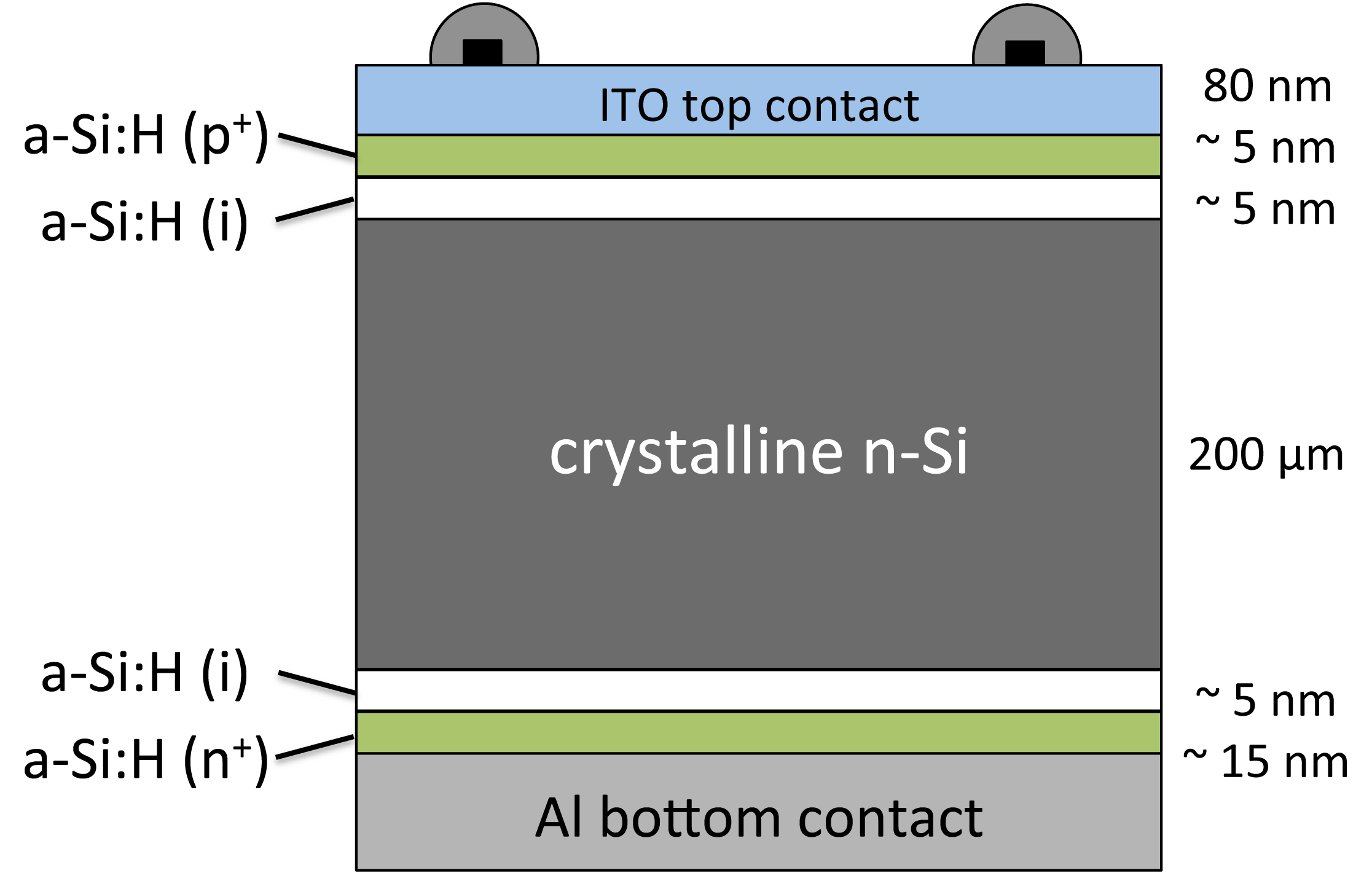
Schematics of a HIT-cell

Plans to expand production were based on rising demands for Sanyo Hungary products, whose leading markets are Germany, Italy, Spain and Scandinavia. The plant at Dorog, outside Budapest, became Sanyo's largest solar module production facility in the world.

In late September 2008, Sanyo announced its decision to build a manufacturing plant for solar ingots and wafers (the building blocks for silicon solar cells) in Inagi, Japan. The plant began operating in October 2009 and was to reach its full production capacity of 70 megawatts (MW) of solar wafers per year by April 2010. Sanyo and Nippon Oil decided to launch a joint company, known as Sanyo Eneos Solar Co., Ltd., for the production and sale of thin-film solar panels. The new joint company began production and sales at an initial scale of 80 MW, while gradually increasing its production capacity. For this joint project, Sanyo drew on its solar cell technologies, based on the technology acquired through the development of the HIT solar cell.

Sanyo is also responsible for the construction of the Solar Ark.

=== Rechargeable batteries ===
Sanyo pioneered the production of nickel cadmium batteries in 1964, nickel metal hydride batteries (NiMh) in 1990, lithium-ion batteries in 1994, and lithium polymer batteries in 1999. In 2000, it acquired Toshiba's NiMh business, including the Takasaki factory. Since the acquisition of Sanyo by Panasonic, ownership of the Takasaki factory was transferred to the FDK Corporation.

=== Electric vehicle batteries ===
Sanyo supplies NiMh batteries to Honda, Ford, Volkswagen and PSA Peugeot Citroen. Sanyo is developing NiMH batteries for hybrid electric vehicles with the Volkswagen group, while their lithium-ion batteries for plug-in HEV will also be housed in Suzuki fleet vehicles.

Sanyo planned to raise monthly production of NiMH batteries for hybrid vehicles from 1 million units to up to 2.5 million by the end of fiscal 2005.

== Brand since 2009 ==
Despite Panasonic's acquisition of Sanyo in 2009 and the termination of the global brand, the name has continued to be marketed in some regions.

=== North America ===
Sanyo had sold TVs in America for over 50 years. In October 2014, Panasonic announced through a licensing agreement with Funai to bring back the Sanyo brand in North America (US, Canada, Mexico) for home consumer electronics such as TVs, soundbars and Blu-ray players. These Sanyo products have since been sold exclusively at Walmart stores. Funai is a major Walmart supplier that also supplies Philips and Emerson TV sets to the retail chain and pays annual royalty payments in return to Panasonic. Consumer Reports commented in 2018 that Sanyo TVs "seem to turn up mostly in Walmart stores, almost as a private label for the retailer."

Many of Sanyo's television sets offer MHL compatibility along with Roku-ready branding via HDMI, meaning the TVs are compatible with Roku's MHL-specific streaming stick. Sometimes included with purchase, such as with the Sanyo FVF5044, this stick enables video streaming and other online functions as an affordable alternative to certain smart TVs; the TV's original remote is capable of browsing the service. Multiple models also have USB ports which allow for immediate photo sharing directly off the stick without any additional software/upgrades.

=== India ===
Panasonic reintroduced the Sanyo brand in India, with the launch of Sanyo LED TV range on August 8, 2016. On July 11, 2017, Sanyo launched its range of smart TVs on Amazon Prime Day. In August 2017, Sanyo unveiled its NXT range of LED televisions exclusively on Flipkart. In December 2017, Sanyo introduced its first 4K smart TV range in India. In September 2019, Sanyo introduced a range of Android TV sets known as the Sanyo Kaizen Series.

Sanyo worked with Energy Efficiency Services Limited to develop a 1.5-ton inverter air conditioner (AC) with an Indian Seasonal Energy Efficiency Ratio (ISEER) of 5.2. Distribution of these air conditioners began in September 2017. On April 4, 2019, Sanyo launched a new AC range exclusively on Amazon.

=== Vietnam ===
In 2026, Panasonic announced the return of the Sanyo brand in Vietnam for air conditioner products.

== Confusion with Sanyo Denki Co. Ltd. ==
Sanyo Electric Co. Ltd. (三洋電機株式会社,) is not affiliated with Sanyo Denki Co. Ltd (山洋電気株式会社), which makes high speed, large airflow, high static pressure DC fans sold under the moniker "San Ace", a product line mainly geared towards the enterprise market.

== Gallery of products ==
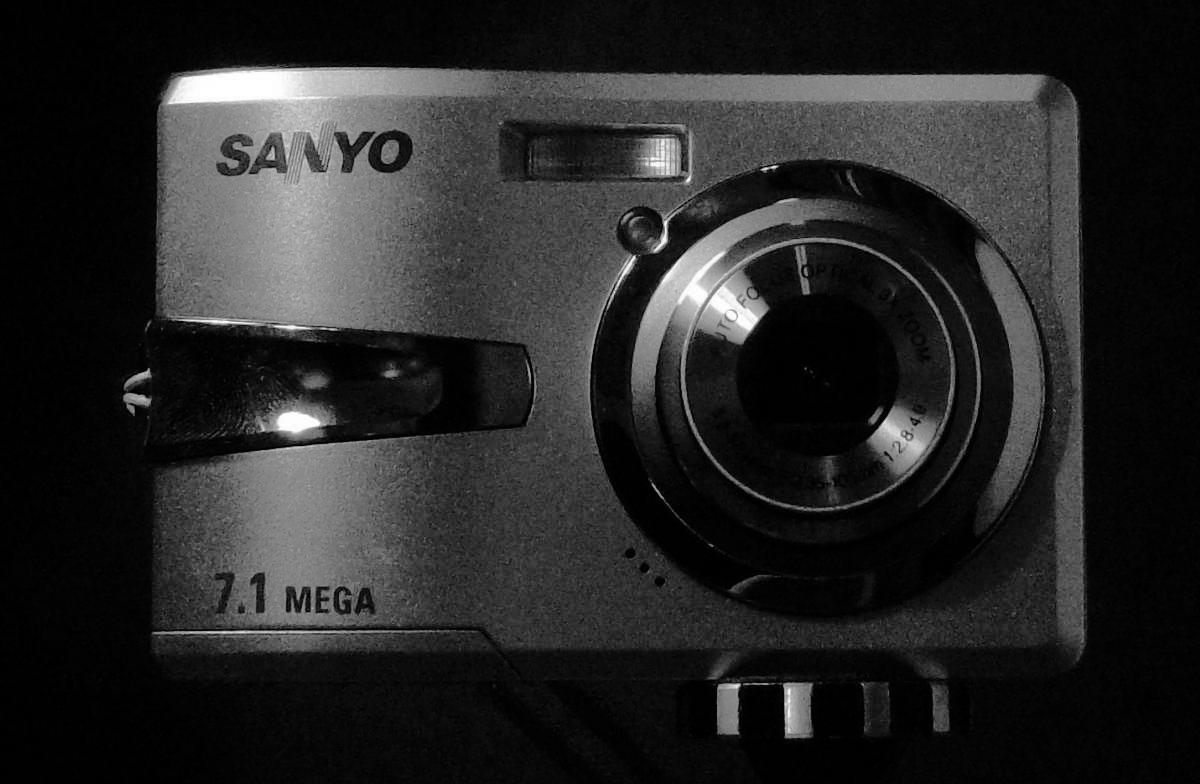
Sanyo VPC-S760 digital camera

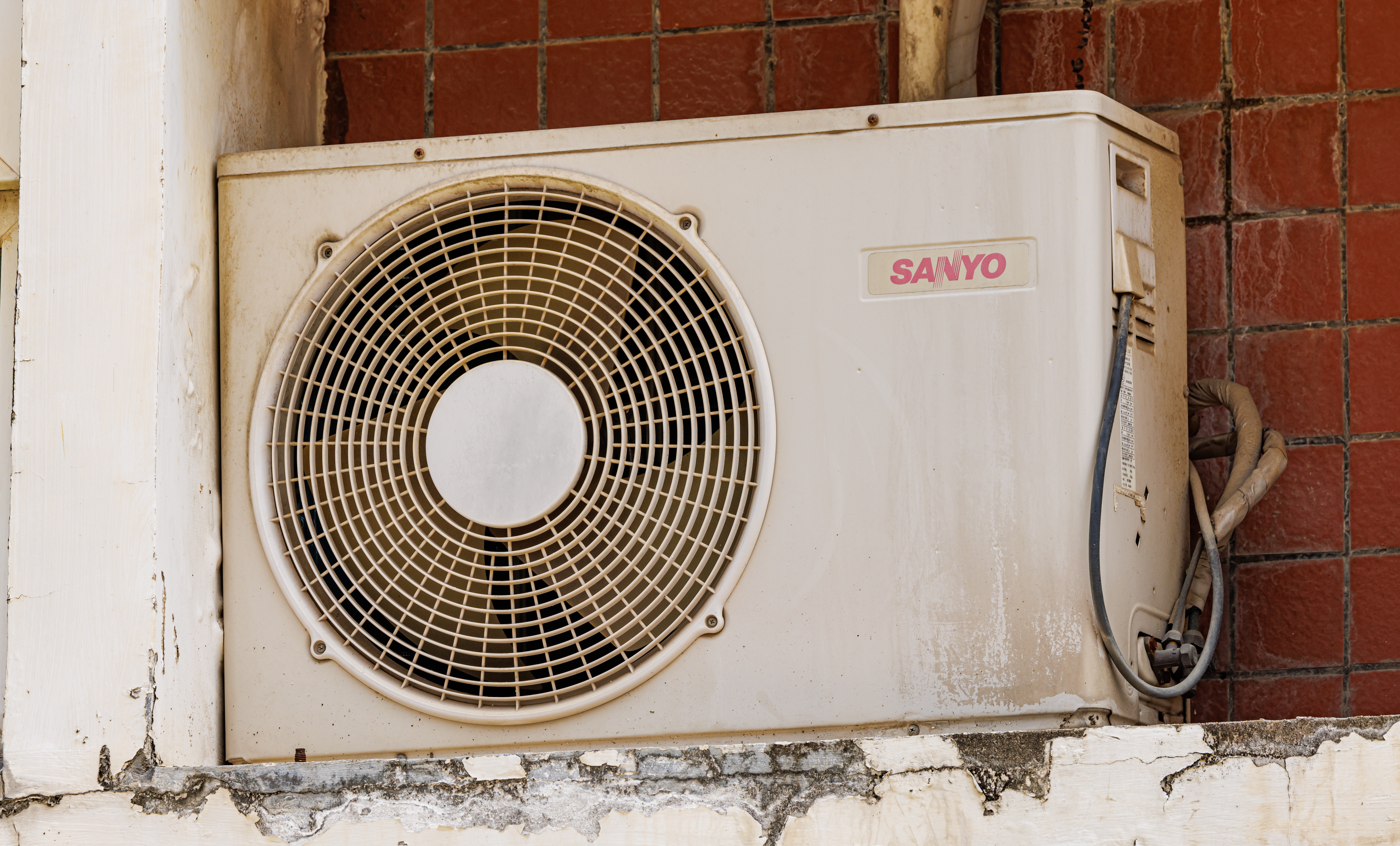
Sanyo outdoor air conditioning unit

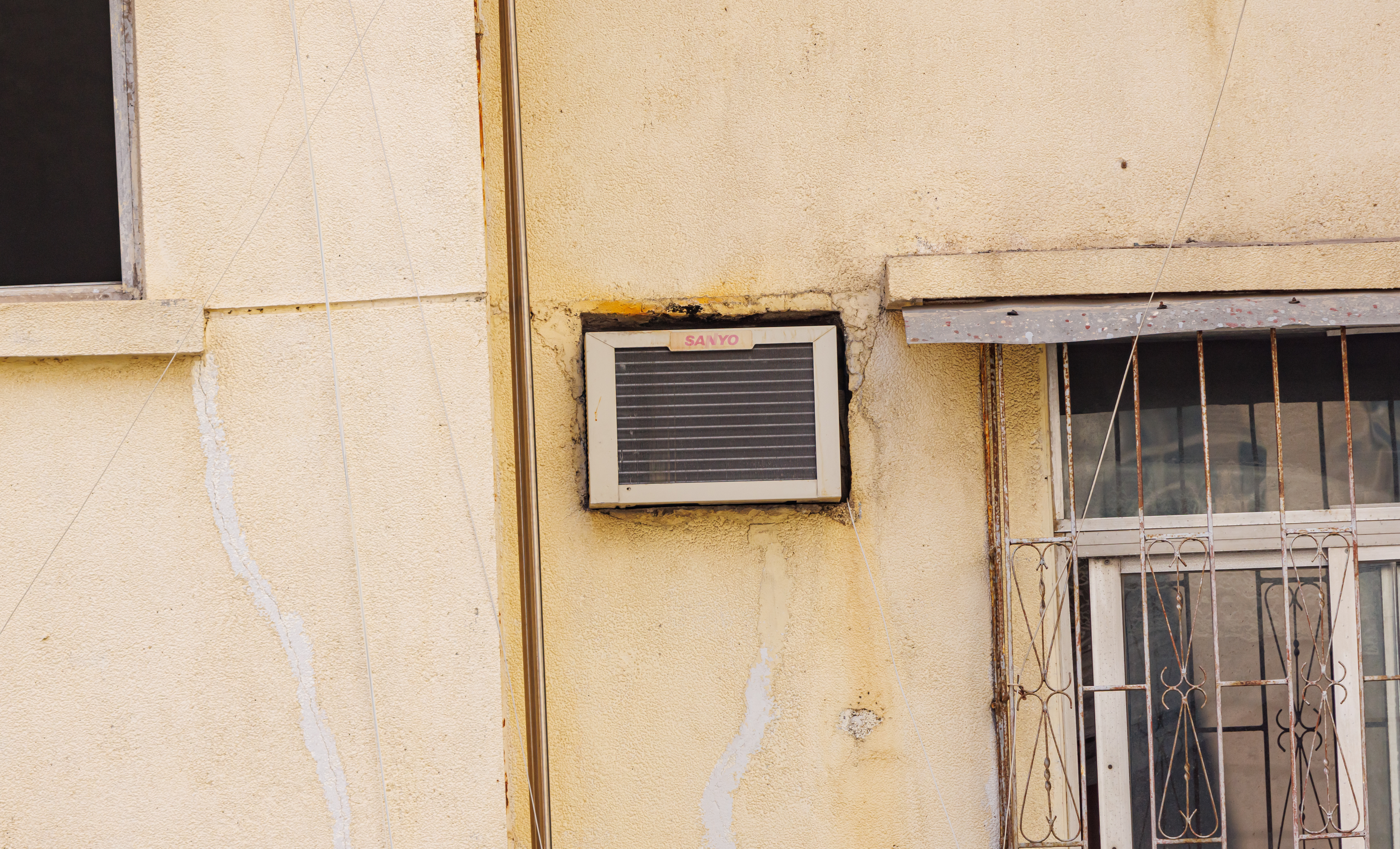
Sanyo window-type outdoor AC unit

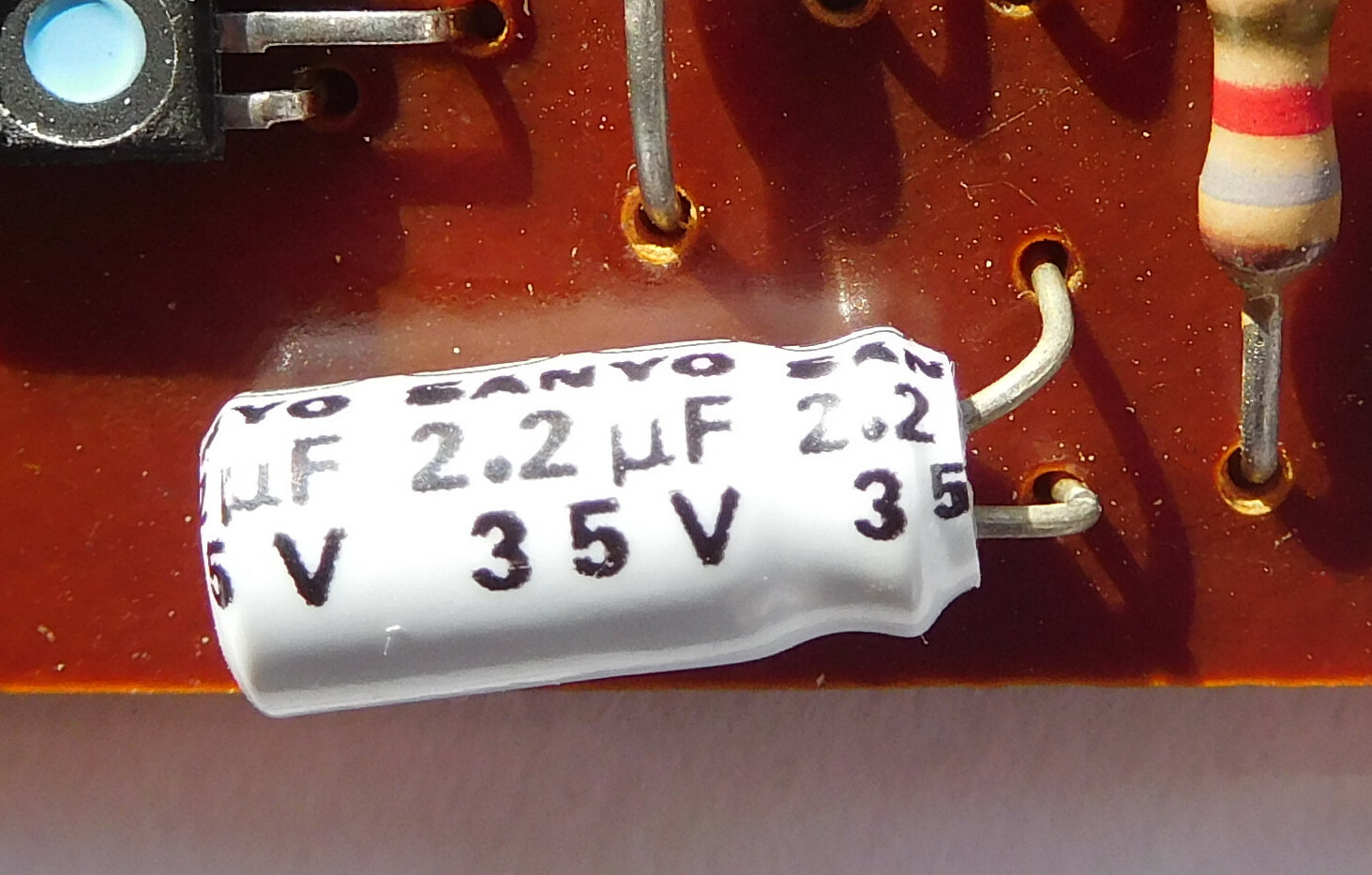
Capacitor from a Sanyo CZ-8127 calculator

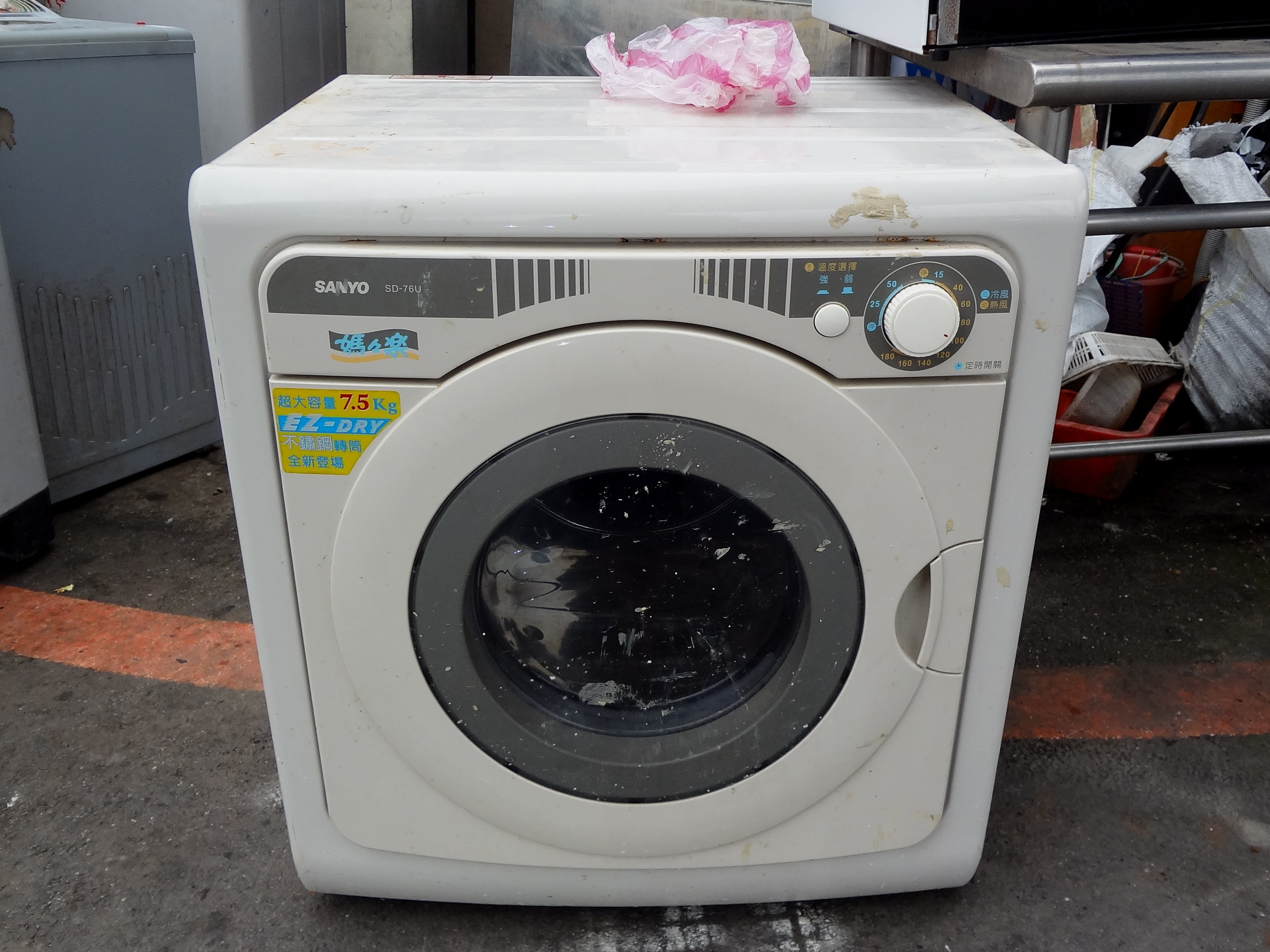
Sanyo SD-76U washing machine

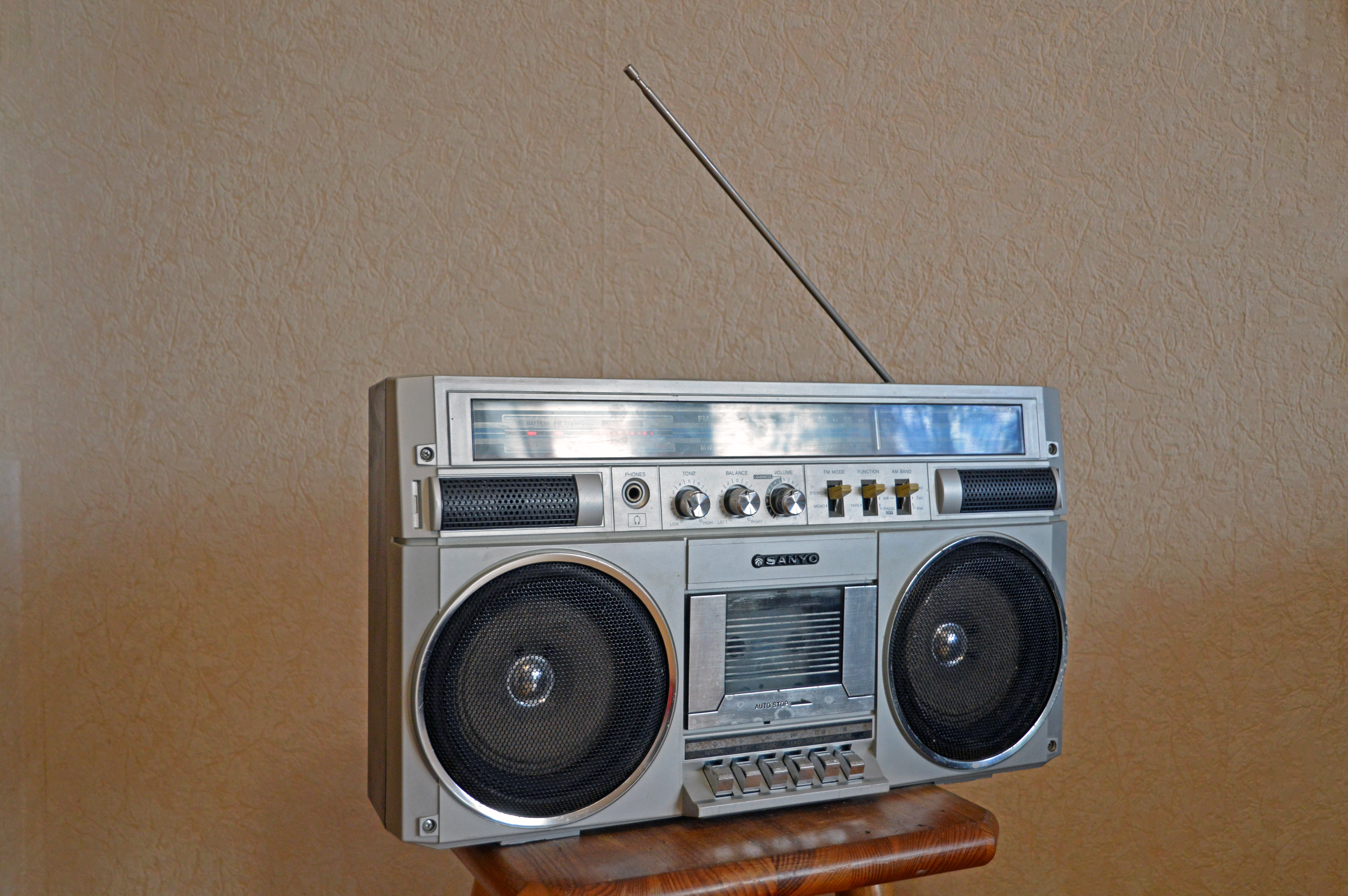
Sanyo M9830K radio cassette recorder

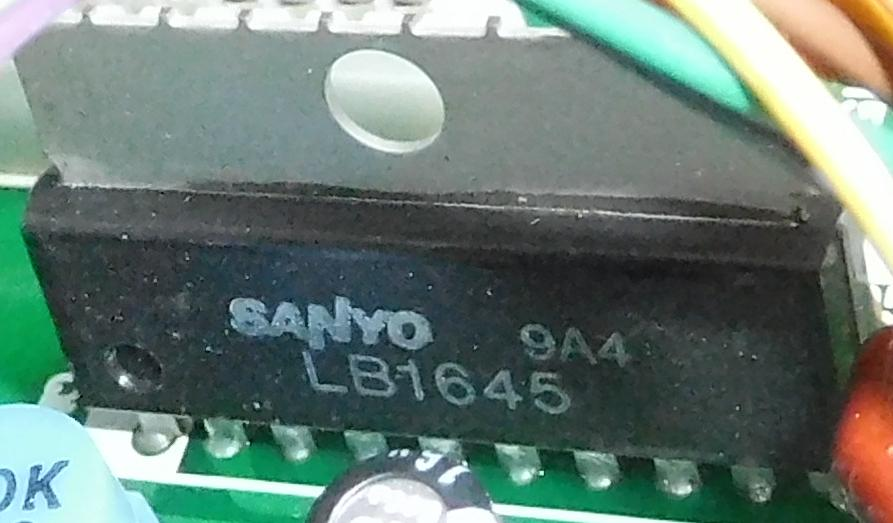
Sanyo LB1645 IC

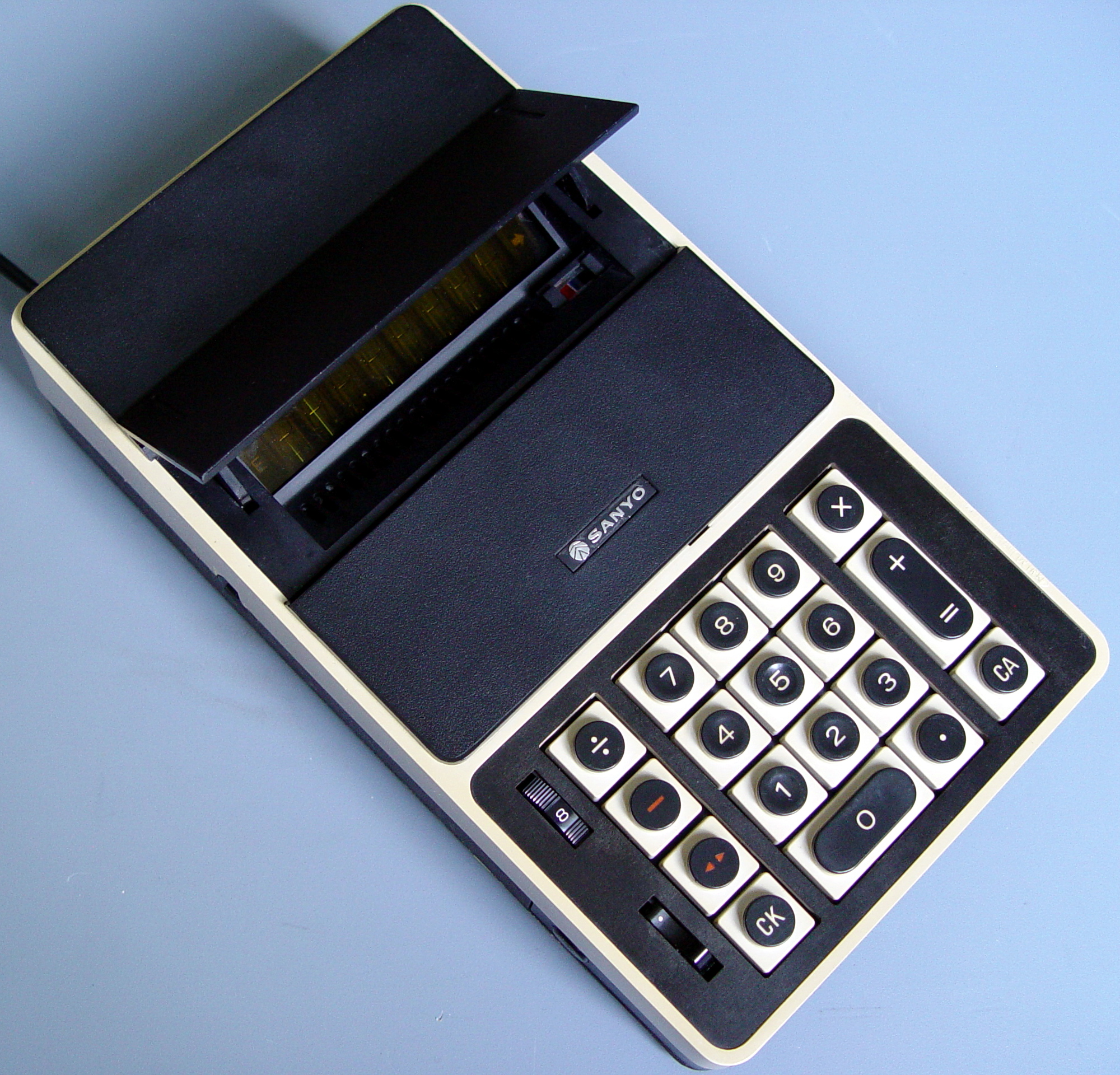
Sanyo ICC-0081 calculator

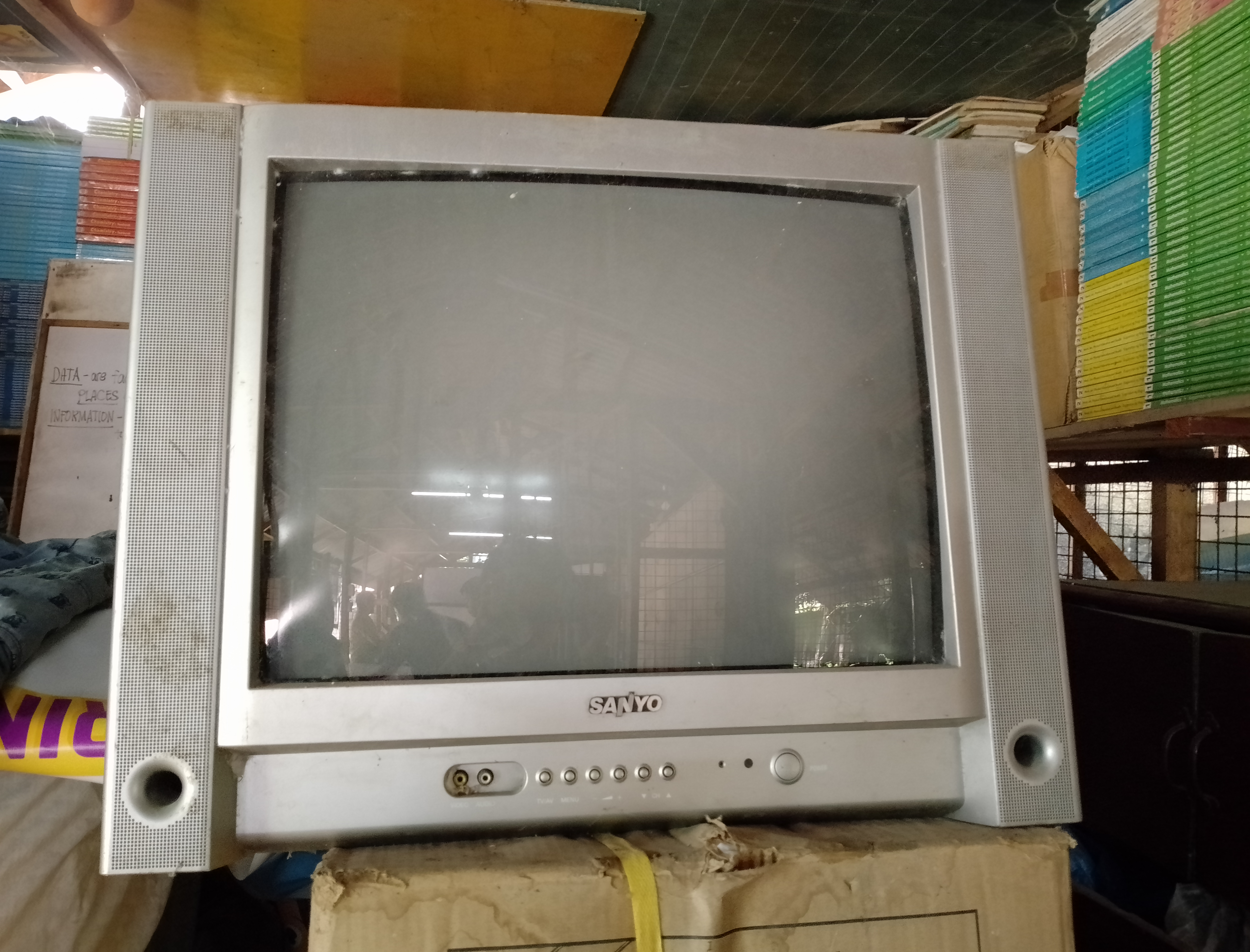
Sanyo-brand CRT TV

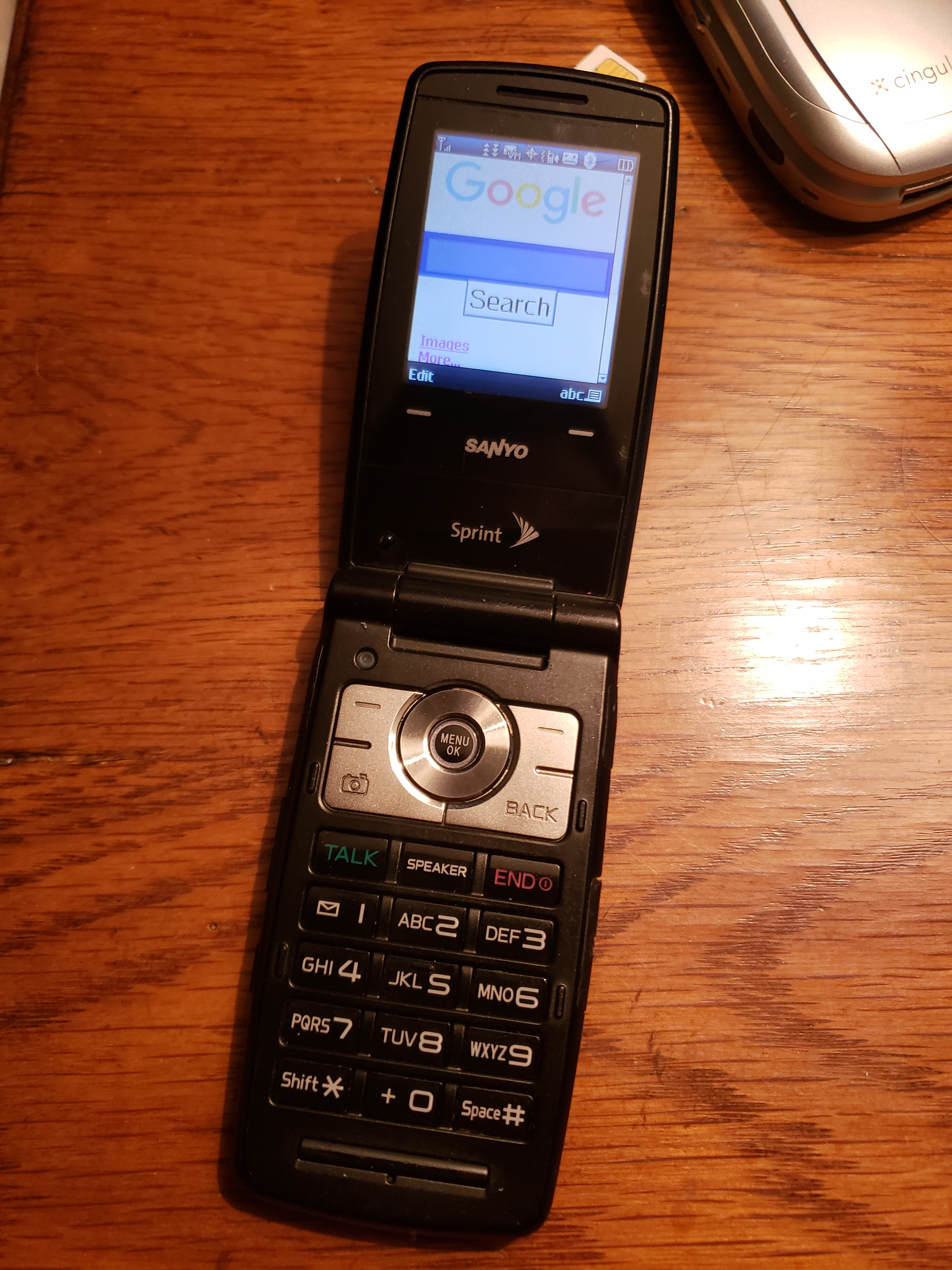
Sanyo Katana (SCP-6600)

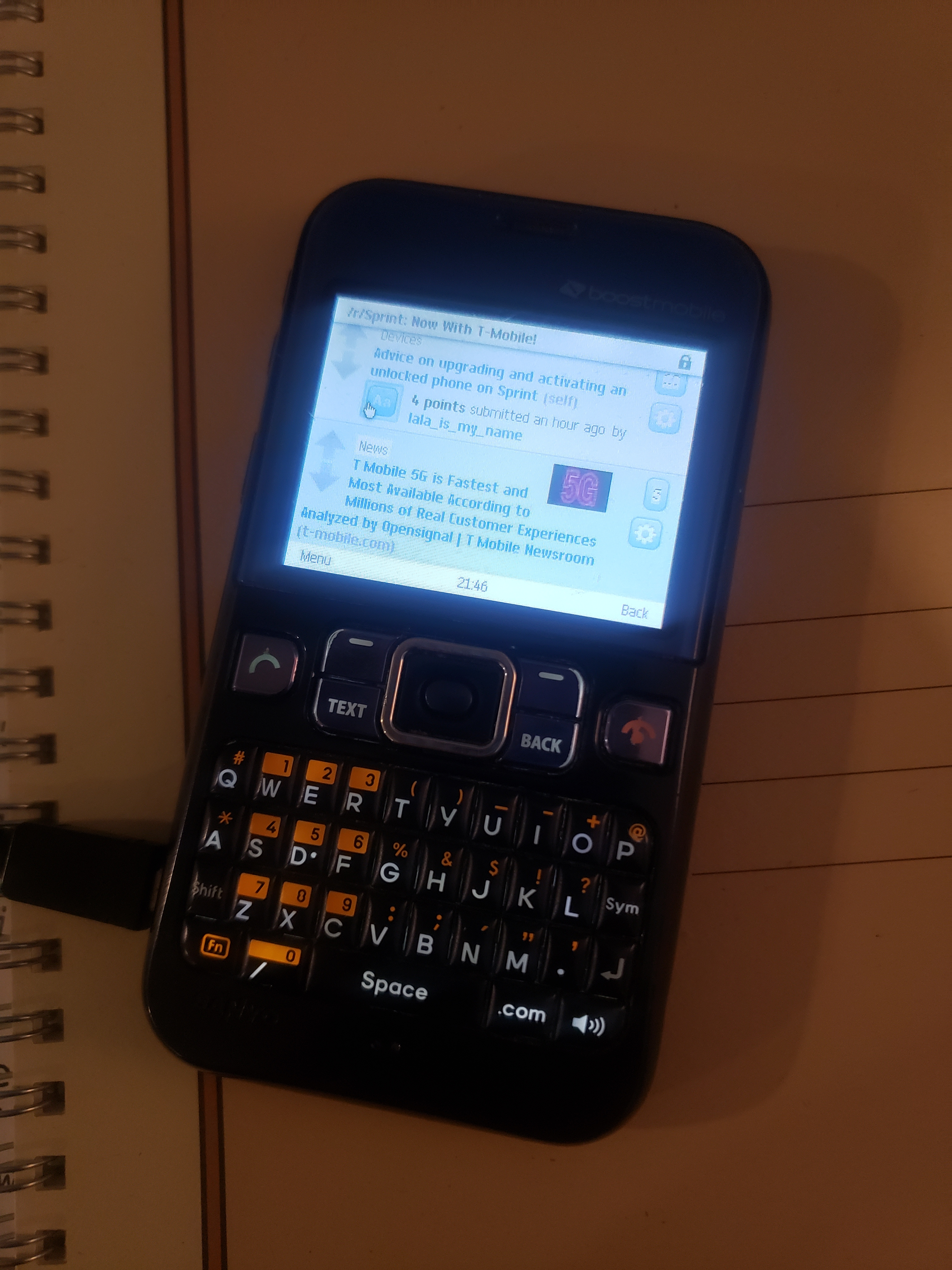
Sanyo Juno (SCP-2700)

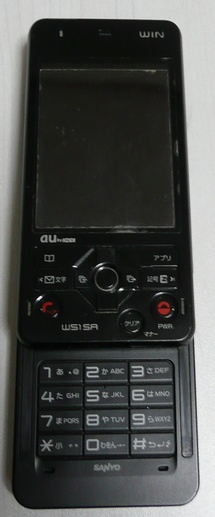
Sanyo W51SA

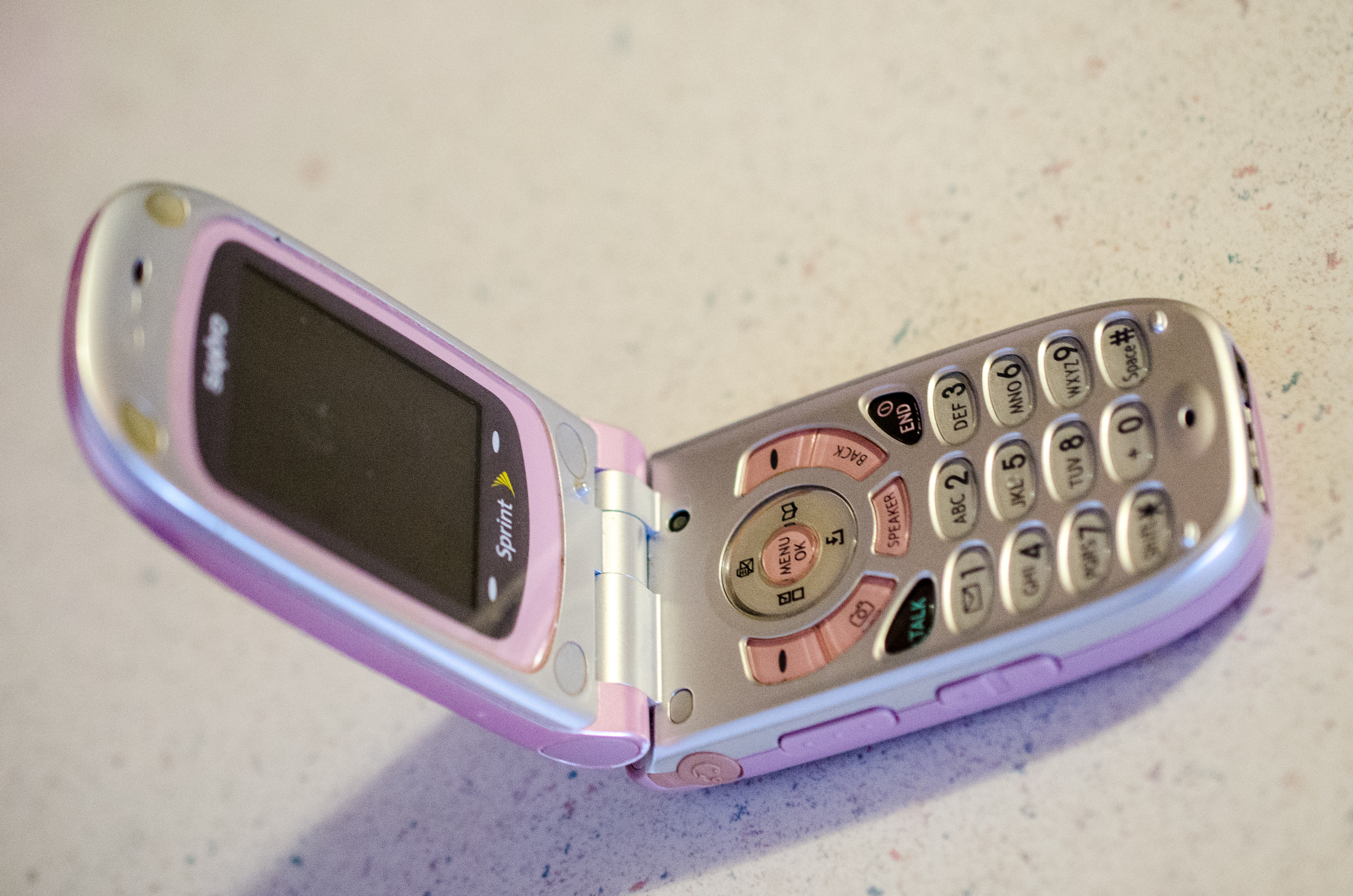
Sanyo SCP-3100

== Sponsorship ==
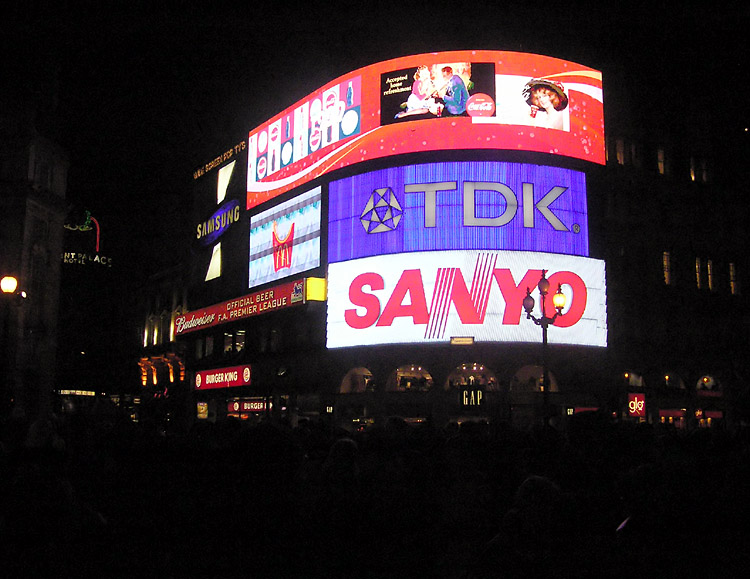
Sanyo logo on neon signs of Piccadilly Circus

Sanyo was the primary sponsor of the Penrith Panthers in the National Rugby League in Australia from 2000 to 2012. In Formula One, the company sponsored Benetton from 1989 to 1995, Williams from 1995 to 1997 and Stewart Grand Prix from 1997 to 1999. In football, the company sponsored the Argentinian club River Plate from 1992 until 1995 and the Brazilian Coritiba from 1995 until 1999.
