= Consumer Technology Hall of Fame =

The Consumer Technology Hall of Fame, founded by the Consumer Technology Association (CTA), honors leaders whose creativity, persistence and determination helped to shape the industry and made the consumer technology marketplace what it is today. According to the CTA, the Consumer Technology Hall of Fame inductees have made a significant contribution to the world, and without these people, people's lives would not be the same.

The CTA announced the first 50 inductees into the Hall of Fame at the 2000 CES. Each year another group are inducted into the Consumer Technology Hall of Fame.

== Inductees ==
=== 2000 ===
- Benjamin Abrams
- Robert Adler
- Edwin Armstrong
- John Logie Baird
- William Balderston
- John Bardeen
- Alexander Graham Bell
- Andre Blay
- Walter Brattain
- Karl Ferdinand Braun
- Nolan Bushnell
- Powel Crosley Jr.
- Lee DeForest
- Ray Dolby
- Allen DuMont
- Thomas Edison
- Carl Eilers
- Philo T. Farnsworth
- Reginald Aubrey Fessenden
- Avery Fisher
- Frank Freimann
- Paul Galvin
- Charles Ginsburg
- Peter Goldmark
- Dr. Sidney Harman
- Heinrich Hertz
- Masaru Ibuka
- Eldridge Johnson
- Jack Kilby
- Henry Kloss
- John Koss Sr.
- David Lachenbruch
- James B. Lansing
- Saul Marantz
- Guglielmo Marconi
- Konosuke Matsushita
- Cmdr. Eugene McDonald Jr.
- Akio Morita
- Robert Noyce
- Alexander M. Poniatoff
- Ed Roberts
- David Sarnoff
- Hermon Hosmer Scott
- Yuma Shiraishi
- William Shockley
- Ross Siragusa Sr.
- Shizuo Takano
- Nikola Tesla
- Jack Wayman
- Vladimir Zworykin

=== 2001 ===
- Emil Berliner
- Sir John Ambrose Fleming
- Hugo Gernsback
- Peter Laurits Jensen
- Earl Muntz
- Valdemar Poulsen
- George Westinghouse

=== 2002 ===
- Ernst F.W. Alexanderson
- Bernard Appel
- W.G.B. Baker
- William E. Boss
- Richard Ekstract
- Walter Fisher
- Raymond Gates
- William Powell Lear
- Sol Polk
- Jack K. Sauter

=== 2003 ===
- Herbert Borchardt
- Leonard Feldman
- Kees A. Schouhamer Immink
- William Kasuga
- Atwater Kent
- Jules Steinberg
- Kenjiro Takayanagi
- Joseph Tushinsky
- Alan Wurtzel

=== 2004 ===
- Alan Dower Blumlein
- Henry Brief
- Robert E. Gerson
- Ken Kai
- Jerry Kalov
- Paul Klipsch
- Norio Ohga
- Dr. Woo Paik
- Steven Wozniak
- Wireless Team: Richard Frenkiel and Joel S. Engel

=== 2005 ===
- Ken Crane
- Joseph Donahue
- Harry Elias
- George Fezell
- Saul Gold
- Art Levis
- Jack Luskin
- Masaharu Matsushita
- John Winegard
- Engineering Team: William Hewlett and David Packard

=== 2006 ===
- Dr. Donald Bitzer
- John F. Doyle
- Robert Galvin
- Andrew S. Grove
- George Heilmeier
- Dr. Nicholas Holonyak
- Howard Ladd
- Gordon Moore
- A.J. Richard
- John Roach
- H. Gene Slottow
- Robert Willson

=== 2007 ===
- Paul Allen
- Dr. Amar Bose
- Dr. Karlheinz Brandenburg
- William G. Crutchfield, Jr.
- James Edward Day
- Dr. Heinz Gerhäuser
- John McDonald
- Steven Sasson
- Richard Schulze
- Dr. Dieter Seitzer
- Art Weinberg

=== 2008 ===
- Ken Kutaragi
- Dean Dunlavey
- Joe Clayton
- Warren Lieberfarb
- Richard Sharp
- Dr. Fritz Sennheiser
- Engineering Team: Martin Cooper and Donald Linder
- Eddy Hartenstein
- Retailing Team: Jewel Abt and David Abt
- Hans Fantel

=== 2009 ===
- Maurice Cohen
- Norman Cohen
- Philip Cohen
- Joseph Flaherty
- Karl Hassel
- Irwin M. Jacobs
- Steve Jobs
- Ralph Mathews
- Aaron Neretin
- John Shalam
- Walton Stinson
- Neil Terk
- Richard E. Wiley

=== 2010 ===
* Dr. Lauren Christopher
- Dr. Ivan Getting
- Richard Kraft
- Frank McCann
- David Mondry
- Eugene Mondry
- Dr. Bradford Parkinson
- Frederik Philips
- Al Sotoloff
- Cynthia Upson
- Dr. Larry Weber

=== 2011 ===
- Ralph Baer
- Ivan Berger
- Samuel Bloomberg
- Lance Braithwaite
- Dr. Eli Harari
- Stanley Hubbard
- Dr. Fujio Masuoka
- Dr. Robert Metcalfe
- Samuel Runco
- Dr. Claude Shannon
- Dr. Andrew Viterbi

=== 2012 ===
- Willard Boyle
- Robert Briskman
- Richard Citta
- Bjorn Dybdahl
- Douglas Engelbart
- Charlie Ergen
- Larry Finley
- Fansy & Henry Harold Gregg
- In Hwoi Koo
- Byung-Chull Lee
- George Smith

=== 2013 ===
- Jim Barton
- Dr. Samar Basu
- Gary Burrell
- Manning Greenberg
- Dr. Marcian (Ted) Hoff
- Dr. Min-Hwan Kao
- Mikio Katayama
- Pierre Omidyar
- Katsuhiko Pier
- Michael Ramsey
- Dr. Ching Tang
- Len Tweten
- Jim Tweten
- Steven Van Slyke
- Meg Whitman

=== 2014 ===
- George Antheil
- C.W. Conn
- Dr. Levy Gerzberg
- Loyd Ivey
- Hedy Lamarr
- Dr. David Lee
- James "Cowboy" Maloney
- Gerald McCarthy
- Walter Mossberg
- Victor & Janie Tsao
- Tim Westergren

=== 2015 ===
- Bob Borchardt
- Tom Campbell
- George Feldstein
- Vic Hayes
- Noel Lee
- Bernie Mitchell
- Wilfred Schwartz
- Dr. Floyd Toole

=== 2016 ===
- Dr. Peter Bingham
- Dr. Jim Carnes
- Sidney Cooper
- Dr. Curt Crawford
- Dr. Jaap Haartsen
- Norm Hunt
- Dr. Jae S. Lim
- David Lorsch
- Chuck Pagano
- Jerry Pearlman
- Don Rea
- Donald Rumsfeld
- Steve Smith
- Joel Spira
- Nat Tiffen
- Ed Tuck
- Hiroshi Yamachi

=== 2017 ===
- Dr. Leonardo Chiariglione
- Gordon Gow
- Marcia Grand
- Arlene Harris
- Darrell Issa
- Dean Kamen
- Ray Kurzweil
- Mike Lazardis
- Frank McIntosh
- Mitch Mohr
- Charles Tandy
- Dr. Hiroshi Yasuda

=== 2018 ===
- John Briesch
- Dr. John Cioffi
- Robert Cole
- Rick Doherty
- Janus Friis
- Kathy Gornik
- Ahti Heinla
- Priit Kasesalu
- Peter Lesser
- Mike Romagnolo
- Jaan Tallinn
- Jim Thiel
- Edgar Villchur
- Niklas Zennstrom

=== 2019 ===
- Colin Angle
- James Barry
- Henry Chiarelli
- Elizabeth "Jake" Feinler
- Shuji Nakamura
- Owen D. Young

=== 2020 ===
- Vint Cerf
- Frank Conrad
- Peter Fannon
- Kazuo Hirai
- Robert Kahn
- James Meyer
- Robin Raskin

=== 2021 ===
- Mike Fasulo
- Nancy Klosek
- Bill & Barbara Pearse
- Roberta Williams

=== 2022 ===
- Joseph & Mayer Akhtarzad
- Tim Baxter
- Wanda Gass
- Dave Heller
- Bill Kincaid
- Mike May
- Jeff Robbin
- Hank Shocklee

=== 2024 ===
- Denise Gibson

=== 2026 ===
- Reggie Fils-Aimé
- Alexis Ohanian
