= Vado =

Vado may refer to:

== Places ==
=== Italy ===
- Vado Ligure, Italy
  - F.C. Vado, Italian association football club

=== Spanish "ford" ===
- Vado, New Mexico
- El Vado Lake, reservoir located in Rio Arriba County, in northern New Mexico
- El Vado Dam on the Rio Chama in the U.S. state of New Mexico

== People ==
- Vado (rapper) (born 1985), American hip hop recording artist
- Vado (footballer) (born 1969)
- Juan del Vado (1625–1691), Spanish composer
- Dan Vado (born 1959), comic book publisher and writer

== Brands ==
- Creative Vado, pocket video cameras developed and manufactured by Creative Labs
