= Frank Freeman =

Frank Freeman may refer to:

- Frank Freeman (architect) (1861–1949), Canadian-American architect
- Y. Frank Freeman (1890–1969), American studio head at Paramount Pictures
- Frank N. Freeman (1880–1961), American educational psychologist
- Frank Freeman (long jumper) (born 1918), 3rd in the long jump at the 1940 USA Outdoor Track and Field Championships

== See also ==
- Frank Freeman's Barber Shop, an 1852 plantation fiction novel by Baynard Rush Hall
- Franklin Freeman (born 1945), lawyer and public official in North Carolina
- Frankie Muse Freeman (1916–2018), American civil rights attorney
- Frank Freimann (1909–1968), American businessperson who was head of Magnavox
