= YouTube Live =

2008 event streamed live

- The YouTube Live channel, featuring LisaNova and Alphacat impersonating Sarah Palin and Barack Obama.
- Starring: Alphacat; Michael Buckley; Bo Burnham; Esmée Denters; Tom Dickson; Fred; Queen Rania of Jordan; Lisanova; Katy Perry; Smosh; will.i.am
- Countries of origin: United States; Japan
- Original language: English

Production
- Production locations: San Francisco, California; Tokyo
- Running time: 126 minutes

Original release
- Network: YouTube
- Release: November 22, 2008

YouTube Live was a 2008 event streamed live on the Internet from San Francisco and Tokyo. It was launched November 22–23, 2008. It was hosted by a variety of YouTube celebrities, including The Black Eyed Peas rapper will.i.am, Tom Dickson of Will It Blend, Michael Buckley, The Happy Tree Friends, Fred, Smosh, Esmée Denters, Bo Burnham and singer Katy Perry among others. On April 8, 2011, the channel was closed, effectively removing all videos. It was replaced by the YouTube live section page.

Jordanian Queen Rania was also honoured at the event with the first YouTube Visionary Award for her efforts to combat stereotypes and misconceptions associated with Arabs and Muslims. With over 3 million views, Queen Rania created her own channel on YouTube in March 2008 to start an international conversation, which she called "unscripted, unedited and unfiltered".

As a sponsor for the event, Flip Video gave away a free Flip Video Mino to many of the audience members to record any of the event. A station to upload videos to YouTube from the Mino was also provided, and promoted, in sponsorship of Flip.

The event was meant to be an annual show, as referenced by Katy Perry at the beginning; however, it remains the only event to date.

== Visionary Award ==
In 2008, YouTube honored Queen Rania of Jordan with the inaugural YouTube Visionary Award. Presenting the award, San Francisco Mayor Gavin Newsom explained the honor as for her "use of technology to instigate social change". The Queen accepted the award via taped message where she spoofed US comedian David Letterman by copying his Top 10 format in a humorous clip where she explained why she started her channel on YouTube. The Queen had launched her channel in March 2008 to break down stereotypes about the Arab and Muslim worlds.
