= Creative Vado =

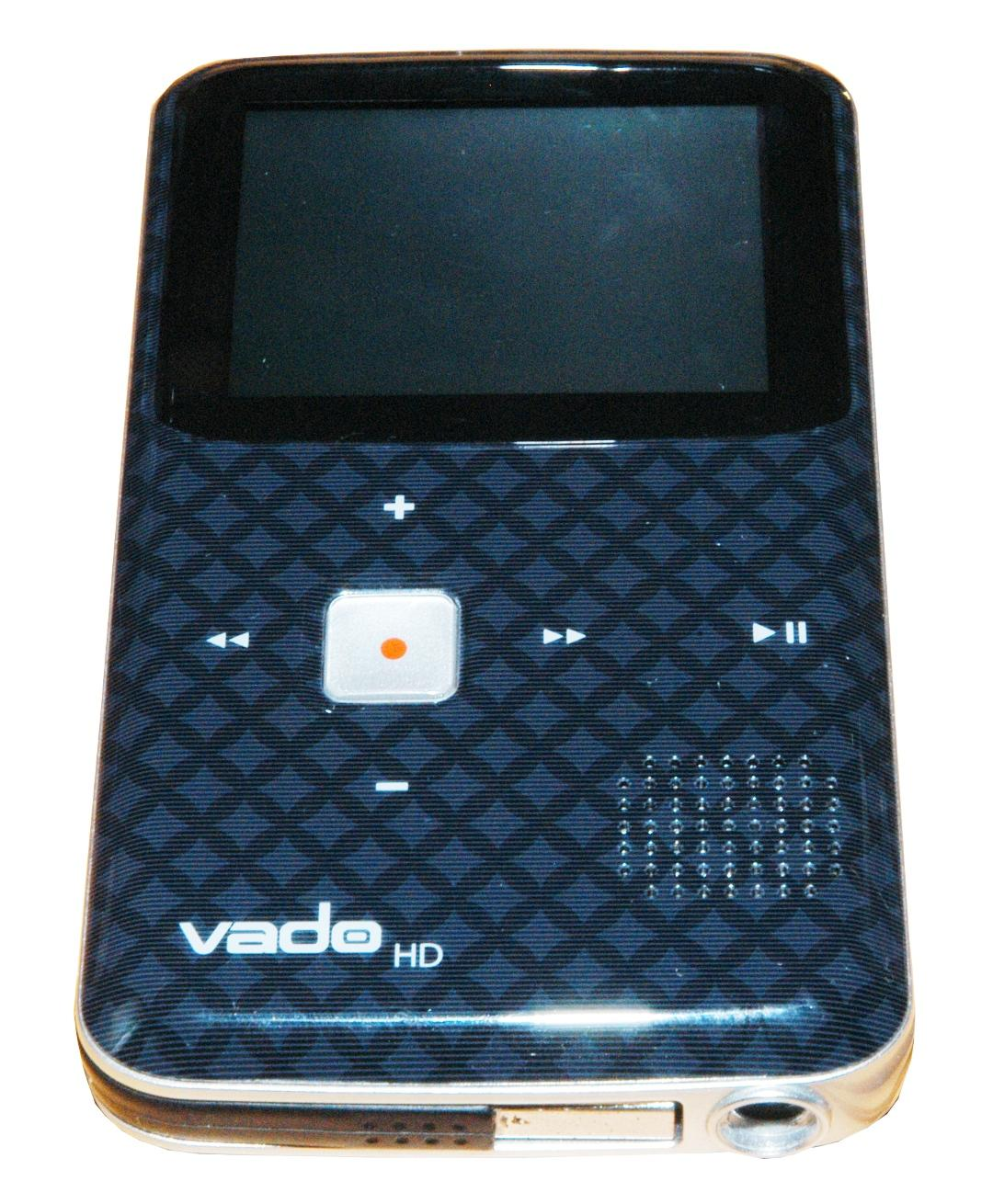
The Creative Vado HD, 3rd Generation

The Vado is any of a series of pocket video cameras developed and manufactured by Creative Labs. The original 640x480 VGA resolution Vado was first introduced in May 2008. A high-definition model, the Creative Vado HD was then made available in December 2008. Designed to be handheld and easily portable, the Vado series of pocket camcorders compete directly with similar devices such as the Flip Video and Sony Bloggie MHS-PM5.

All Creative Vado and Creative Vado HD units feature a tripod mount, anti-AC-flicker feature which can be set for 50 Hz and 60 Hz regions, as well as RCA TV out functionality. The image sensors in all Vado units use CMOS technology for improved low-light sensitivity.

Vados are powered by Lithium-Ion batteries, charged via USB power. The USB connector can be found at the bottom of the unit, and is held in place magnetically. When a USB connection is required, the flexible male A-type USB connector is simply pulled out of its place and connected to a computer's USB port. Vado devices offer two USB modes - A normal mode, which charges whilst allowing data transfer over USB, and an express mode, which enables a fast charge (4 hours to fully charge, as opposed to 7.5 hours in the normal mode), but disallows any form of data transfer.

All Creative Vado and Creative Vado HD units also ship with the Vado Central software, which is stored within the Vado's internal storage. The program only runs off the Vado device itself, and provides simple video editing functions, as well as the ability to upload to online video sharing services, most notably YouTube and Photobucket.

== Original Creative Vado ==
The original Vado camcorder was introduced in May 2008. Sporting 2 gigabytes of internal storage and a battery life of 2 hours, the camcorder is capable of producing 640x480 MPEG-4 video at 30 frames per second for either one hour at the high quality setting, or two hours at the normal quality setting.

== Creative Vado HD ==
The Creative Vado HD

In December 2008, Creative unveiled the 1st generation of the high-definition version of the Vado, the Creative Vado HD. Structurally similar to the original Vado, the Vado HD captures 1280×720 720p HD video in the h.264/MPEG-4 codec at 30 frames per second. This version of the Vado sports 8 gigabytes of internal memory, which captures 2 hours of HD video at high quality (known as HD+), 4 hours at normal quality (known as HD), and 8 hours in 640×480 VGA.

A Vado user can gain access to the unit's settings by simultaneously depressing the Play/Pause and Delete buttons.

The Vado HD ships with version 2.0 of the Vado Central software.

The Vado HD received an 89 rating from PCWorld, 4/5 stars and an Editors Choice award from PC Magazine, and generally favorable reviews from users on Amazon.

== Creative Vado HD (3rd Generation) ==
In December 2009, Creative released a successor to the original Creative Vado HD, the Creative Vado HD (Third Generation). The Third Generation now encodes to MP4 format, offering more compatibility and better compression. The new firmware also allows for manual exposure adjustment, a feature uncommon to cameras of this category. Another new feature introduced in the third generation is the ability to take still photographs, at 1280x720 resolution. Instead of pressing a combination of buttons to access the settings page, one could now gain access to the page by pressing and holding the mode selector button, which normally switches between still photography mode and video capture mode.

In terms of design changes, the physical buttons on the original Vado HD were replaced by capacitive touch areas. It also features a new multi-function 3.5 mm jack, which can be set to serve as a headphones jack, an external microphone input, or as an audio/video output to RCA. In addition, the device also sports a HDMI output, allowing direct connection to any HD-capable display.

Unlike the original Vado HD, the Third Generation is only offered in a 4 gigabyte version. With this capacity, the Third Generation Vado produces one hour of 720p video at approximately 7000 kbit/s, or two hours of 720p video at approximately 4000 kbit/s.

The Vado HD (3rd Generation) ships with version 3.0 of the Vado Central software. In addition to being able to upload directly to YouTube and Photobucket, this version also allows direct uploads to box.net, Facebook and Kincast.

== Technical specifications ==
Model	Creative Vado	Creative Vado HD	Vado HD Third Generation
Capacity	2GB	8GB	4GB
Resolution	640x480	1280x720	1280x720
Dimensions	3.9" x 2.2" x 0.6" (100mm x 55mm x 16mm)	3.9" x 2.2" x 0.6" (100mm x 55mm x 16mm)	3.9" x 2.2" x 0.6" (98.8 mm x 57.6 mm x 15.8 mm)
Weight with battery	84g	100g	93g
