= Fedco =

American membership department store chain (1948 to 1999)

Federal Employees' Distributing Company
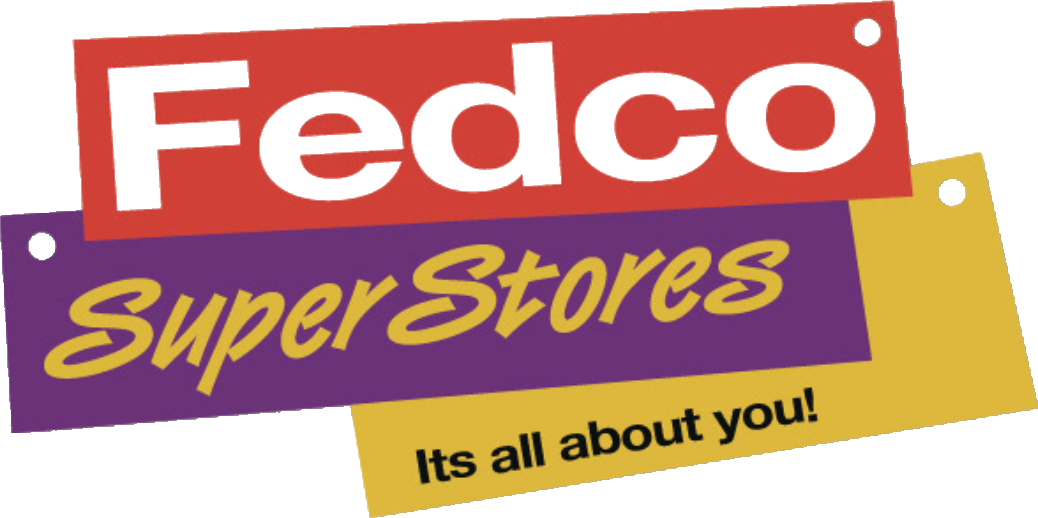
- Type: Department Store
- Industry: Retail
- Founded: 1948; 78 years ago in Los Angeles, California
- Founders: U.S. Post Office employees
- Defunct: 1999; 27 years ago
- Fate: Filed for bankruptcy
- Headquarters: 9300 Santa Fe Springs Rd, Santa Fe Springs, California
- Number of locations: 10 (when it closed in 1999)
- Area served: Southern California
- Products: Clothing, footwear, housewares, jewelry, garden, furniture, appliances, sporting goods, produce, hardware, toys, electronics
- Owner: Members-owned co-operative

Federal Employees' Distributing Company, known as Fedco, was a membership department store chain that operated in Southern California from 1948 to 1999.

== History ==
=== Beginning ===
The chain was unusual in that it was a nonprofit consumers' cooperative. It was founded by 800 U.S. Post Office employees who wanted to leverage their buying power by purchasing goods directly from wholesalers, and eliminate the additional markup of a retail store. The Board of Directors, headed by Robert Kee, established the first store on Slauson Avenue in Los Angeles. Members would come into the store and find items they wished to purchase in various catalogs. As demand grew, the Board of Directors began to carry merchandise in the store. Business flourished and they took over adjoining storefronts. Under the guidance of Kee, FedScript was developed. This allowed a form of "borrowing" but ensured that the funds could only be spent at Fedco. Lines included general merchandise, grocery, and, in some locations, auto services and furniture. Lifetime membership was less than five dollars for employees of the U.S. government, students, and their family members.

The organization of the company was similar to that used for credit unions, in which the stores were owned and operated by a not-for-profit organization that was owned by its members, who elected a board of directors. Like a credit union, store membership was legally restricted to a defined group. Over the years, the membership pool was widened to include anyone who had any relationship with the federal or local governments, as well as their employees, children, etc. It also included anyone who received regular payments from the government, such as social security pensions.

Membership cards were required to enter a store and to use a check as payment. However, it was very difficult to restrict non-members from purchasing from the stores in cash, since the lifetime membership cards did not include photographic ID like those used by later membership stores such as Sam's Club. Anyone could borrow or take a member's card and enter. Names on the cards were only checked when paying by check.

Fedco's lifetime membership cost $10 (~$20.00 in 2025) in 1998.

At its peak, Fedco had ten department stores plus three appliance-only stores, and served 4 million members.

=== Business model ===
The management strove to make Fedco a one-stop shopping destination, similar to a hypermarket concept. The customer/member was presented with a wide variety of consumer products: camera equipment, office machines, major and minor appliances, garden supplies, clothing, jewelry, liquor and groceries. The stores also had a full-service deli and a separate produce department. Many stores also had a tire and battery shop. The corporate buyers often found one-of-a-kind deals on miscellaneous items, including seasonal items like toys during the Christmas holiday season.

The stores were tightly managed. To foster smooth operation, romantic interest between employees was discouraged, and married couples were not allowed to hold Fedco jobs concurrently.

Classic Fedco sign

Some of the departments around the periphery of the building were not Fedco businesses, but instead were concessions operated by others. For example, the Stereo Components department was run by Coastron, seller of the Soundcraftsmen line of stereo equipment. Coastron paid rent to Fedco to operate in the building. Other concessions included the Optical Department (later bought out by Fedco), the Shaver Shop, and the Key & Lock Shop. Fedco offered a variety of private label items, including electronics, liquor, watches and some groceries.

The membership model was successful for Fedco for decades. It was common for the stores to be crowded, with long lines at checkout. A picture of a packed LA Coliseum, posted above the drinking fountain near the exit of the San Bernardino store, proclaimed, "More people shop at Fedco stores each week than the attendance of the 1984 Olympic Games opening ceremonies!" There were separate registers for general merchandise, groceries and produce. At one time, purchased merchandise was placed in a bag and a color-coded tape was placed on the stapled bag. The tape color varied from day to day to prevent theft. In later years, as merchandise was bagged, the bags were stapled shut and the receipt stapled on the top. In a precursor to the common practice at most membership clubs today, the sealed bags and receipts were checked at the exit.

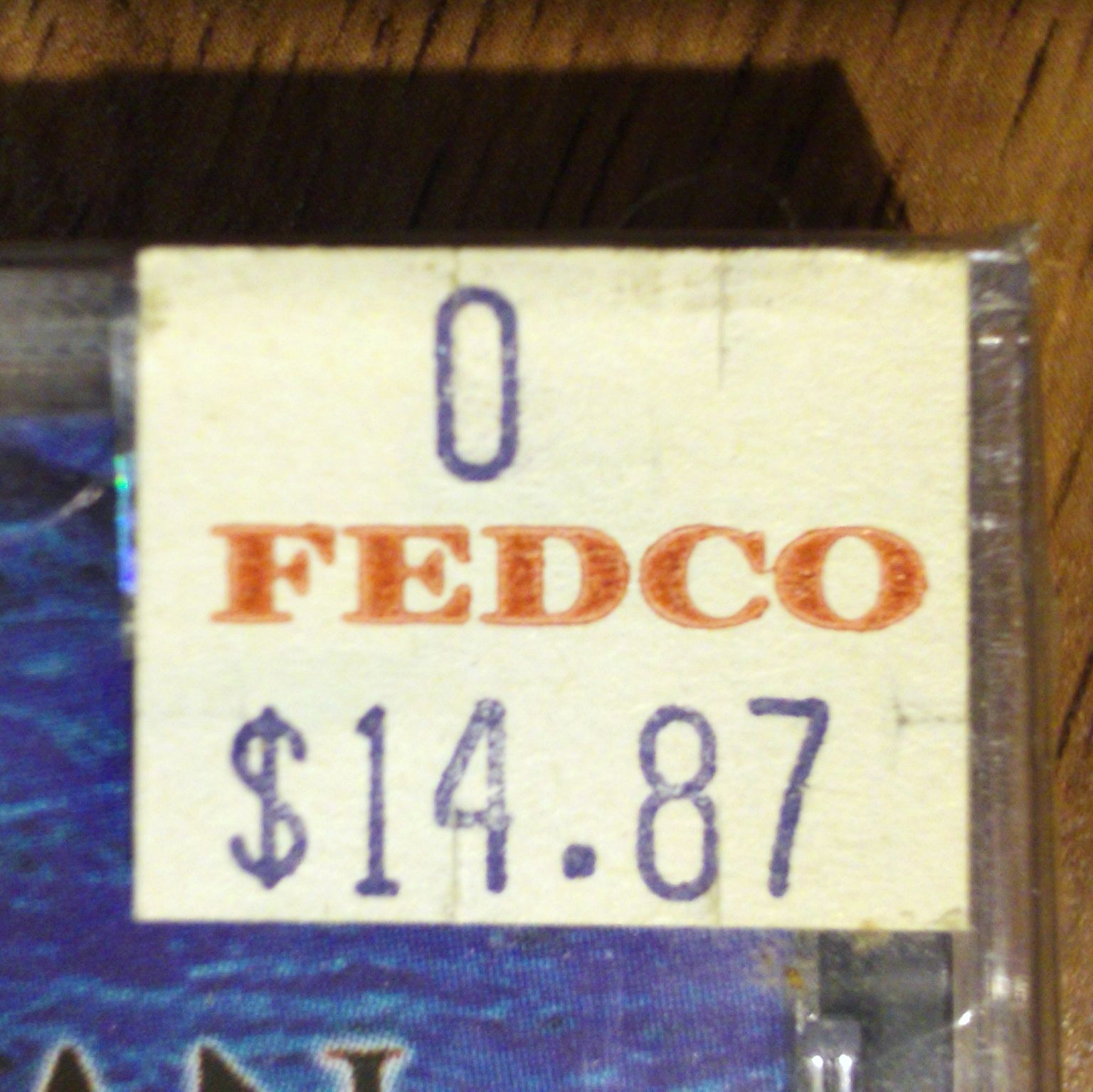
A Fedco price tag marking a compact disc

Fedco had an aggressive pricing model and employed "secret shoppers" to determine prices of other retailers. The Fedco price on many items ended in 87 cents to claim the lowest price, even if it was only pennies below the customary 99 cent prices of competitors.

For most of its lifetime, Fedco was closed on Wednesdays, though some employees would work, re-stocking or taking inventory. During the Christmas season, Fedco was open 7 days a week to accommodate the customer surge. Fedco would sometimes require employees to work up to 10 hours a day. Working 6 days a week was possible during the summer surge and the Christmas season.

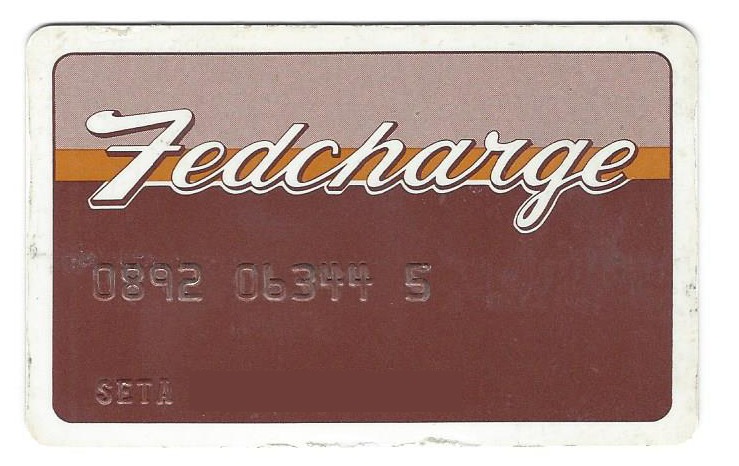
Front of a Fedco Fedcharge Card

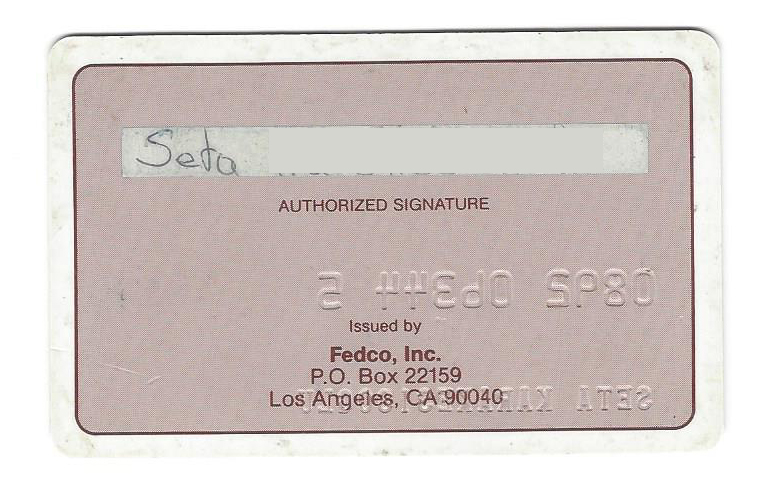
Back of a Fedco Fedcharge Card

Fedco employees were members of the Teamsters Union, many in Local 232 and 542. They went on strike against the company in the summer of 1979, seeking higher pay as compared to members of the Retail Clerks Union. The strike was resolved after about 3 weeks.

In 1994, Fedco was one of the first membership stores to start accepting bank-issued credit cards. Most discount stores of this type did not accept credit cards because transaction fees charged by the credit card transaction processors were quite high in relation to their (single-digit percent range) margins, and they would have to raise prices to compensate, putting them at a competitive disadvantage to stores that did not accept credit cards.

=== Fedco stores ===
Fedco at Cerritos, California

Fedco had several locations in Southern California including:

1. Van Nuys (Los Angeles), 14920 Raymer Street, store #1, replaced by Target (1956-1999)
2. La Cienega (Los Angeles), 3535 South La Cienega Boulevard, store #2, replaced by Target (1961-1999)
3. San Bernardino, 570 South Mt. Vernon Avenue, store #3 replaced by El Super (1968-1999)
4. Cerritos, 11525 South Street, store #4 (1970-1999), replaced by Target
5. National City, 1100 Highland Avenue, store #5, replaced by Walmart (1984-1999)
6. Pasadena, 3111 East Colorado Boulevard, store #6, replaced by Target (1965-1999)
7. Costa Mesa, 3030 Harbor Boulevard, store #7 replaced by Target (1972-1999)
8. Ontario, 2534 South Archibald Avenue, store #8, replaced by Ontario Police Department facility (1982-1999)
9. Escondido, 1475 East Valley Parkway, store #9, replaced by Home Depot (1986-1999)
10. Buena Park, 8450 La Palma Avenue, store #10 (formerly May Co.), replaced by Walmart (1993-1999)

Previous locations:

1. Los Angeles, 3928 West Slauson Avenue, replaced by La Cienega Boulevard store in 1961
2. San Bernardino, 1140 West Second Street, replaced by the Mt. Vernon Avenue store in 1968
3. Lakewood, 5436 North Woodruff Avenue, replaced by the Cerritos store in 1970
4. San Diego, 54th Street and Euclid Avenue, replaced by the National City store (1957-1984)

=== Fedco Reporter ===
The Fedco Reporter was the store's catalog and magazine. Board President Robert Kee and Edward Butterworth were instrumental in establishing the Reporter. Edward Butterworth rose from company attorney to Board member to the position of CEO. The department was run by art director and art department manager Sal Heredia and editor Anita McManes. The Reporter was a bi-monthly 62-page dated catalog mailed to members. There were seasonal specials and sales with themes like "Buyers' Goof Days". In addition to showcasing products, it also contained short one-column articles. Most issues contained one article about updates in federal policy that might affect federal employees. The majority of the articles were about minor but colorful stories in California history, and were labeled with a "California Historical" logo.

Copies of the Fedco Reporter and other Fedco paraphernalia are now being maintained as part of the Fedco Superstores Inc. Collections in the Cal State L.A. University Library.

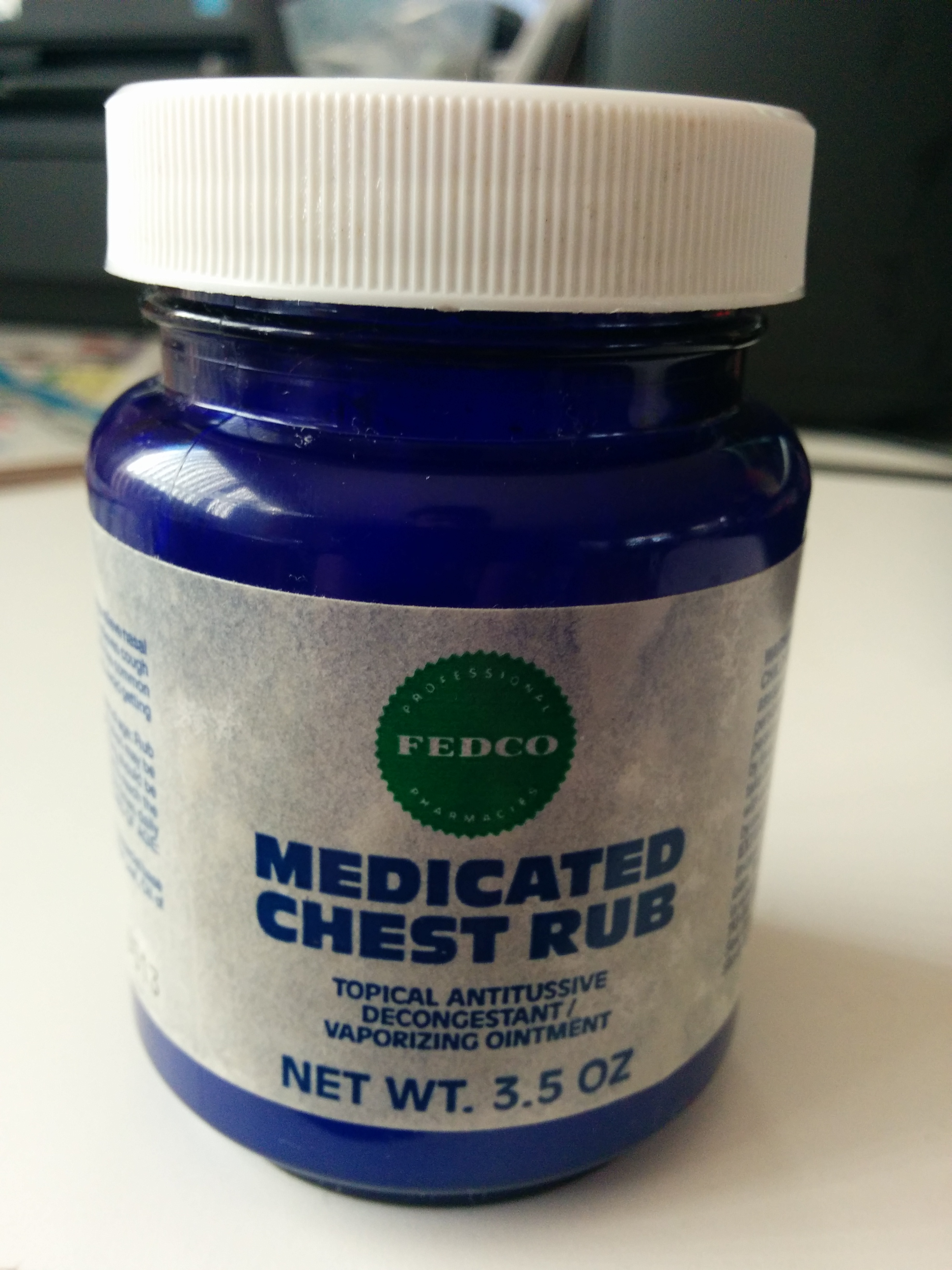
Fedco Medicated Chest Rub

=== Bankruptcy ===
Fedco predated the giant chains Walmart, Target, Kmart, Ames, and fellow membership chains Costco and Sam's Club, but remained a regional chain and eventually was unable to compete with the national chains.

The management tried many new ideas to keep up with competitors, such as accepting bank cards when other stores were only accepting private store credit cards, refurbishing stores, and by allowing fast food chains to open restaurants, such as Panda Express, inside select stores.

The company lost $14 million caused by damages done to the La Cienega store during the Los Angeles riots of 1992.

Fedco filed for Chapter 11 bankruptcy in 1999, at which point it had been the longest-operating membership-based store in the country. Most of its locations were sold to the Target chain, while others (like the Escondido, California, location) were razed, and the Ontario location became the city's police department. The $10 lifetime membership at Fedco was exchanged for a $300 Target coupon book at the 1999 bankruptcy. The proceeds of the bankruptcy sale were placed in a trust fund intended to charitably serve communities that had hosted Fedco stores.

== See also ==
- Big-box store
- Hypermarket
- Gemco
- Zody's

== Sources ==
- Karen Newell Young, "Discount Stores in County Proliferate: A Profile of Fedco,", Los Angeles Times (Orange County ed.) February 19, 1988, Orange County Life p. 8.
