= Widget UK =

Consumer electronics distributor

Widget UK was a consumer electronics distribution, based in Stevenage, England, which became part of CMS Distribution in 2016.

Originally a distributor for UK handheld computer manufacturer Psion, it became an early distributor for GPS manufacturer TomTom and in 2009 became the UK's distributor for the Flip Video range of handheld video cameras. In 2011 the company became the first distributor in Europe for the Fitbit personal fitness device. It supplies exclusively to retailers.

Widget UK was listed in both 2008 and 2009 as one of Europe's fastest growing technology companies in the Deloitte Fast 500 and in 2006 and 2007 in the Sunday Times Fast Track 100 of the UK's fastest growing privately held companies. The company has been shortlisted for the CRN Specialist Distributor of the Year award in 2006, 2007, 2008, 2009 and 2010 and in 2010 it was also shortlisted for the Technology and Innovation Award at the Growing Business Awards.

In 2012 it acquired a majority stake in Dutch distributor Now Mobile Bv and in 2013 it opened a subsidiary in Denmark to facilitate sales to the Nordic region.
