= David Lachenbruch =

American journalist (1921–1996)

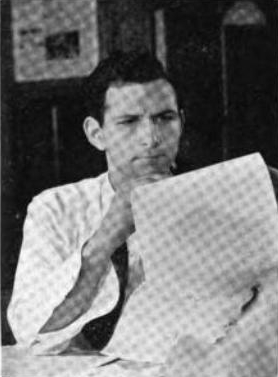
- Lachenbruch in a 1947 issue of The Michigan Alumnus
- Born: 1921; New Rochelle, New York, United States
- Died: November 3, 1996 (aged 75); Manhattan, New York, United States

David Lachenbruch (1921 – November 3, 1996) was an American journalist and an editor of Television Digest. He previously worked at The Gazette and Daily. He was born in 1921 in New Rochelle, New York, and died in 1996 in Manhattan at age 75. In 2000, he was inducted into the Consumer Electronics Hall of Fame by the Consumer Technology Association, which credited him with coining the words camcorder and consumer electronics.

== Bibliography ==
- Lachenbruch, David (1979). Videocassette Recorders: The Complete Home Guide. Everest House. ISBN 978-0-89696-016-9.
- Lachenbruch, David; Baldini, Tony (1985). Television. Milwaukee: Raintree Publishers. ISBN 978-0-8172-1408-1.
