= Soundcraftsmen =

American high-end audio stereo components manufacturer

Soundcraftsmen was a manufacturer of high-end audio stereo components located in Santa Ana, California, United States.

The company was founded in 1961 by Ralph Yeomans, a concessionaire in Fedco (a discount membership store chain in southern California, until the chain closed in 1999). Early Soundcraftsmen components included tube-type receivers and amplifiers. Ralph Yeomans and Charles Gassett, a southern California audio equipment representative and international marketing entrepreneur selling Coastron Sherwood Electronic Laboratories receivers at the time, had an interest in expanding the brand nationwide. Yeomans and Gassett decided the first product was to be an equalizer, something not already on the market. They employed an electronics engineer, Paul Rolfes, in 1968 to design the equalizer. It was introduced by Gassett at the 1969 CES in New York. National distribution started in late 1970. In the mid-1970s they introduced their line of preamplifiers and power amplifiers, including the first preamplifier/equalizer combo. Soundcraftsmen equalizers and their compact "brick" style power amplifiers gained a sizable following among audiophiles during the 1970s and 1980s. All Soundcraftsmen equalizers and amplifiers were made at the company's Santa Ana, California facility. In the early 1970s they also sold a solid-state stereo receiver, through the Fedco stores, and Atlantic Music. It was built by Electro-Voice but shipped with a Soundcraftsmen brand faceplate; no national distribution was sought for this product.

As mentioned, Yeomans operated the HiFi Stereo Components Concession in Fedco under the vendor name of Coastron. The department was an independent concession within Fedco, hiring its own staff and renting floor space. Coastron supported its Fedco operations from a warehouse in Montebello, near Los Angeles. The second in command at Coastron was Robert Rann. Soundcraftsmen and Coastron-sold electronic and speaker products were repaired by a technician at the Montebello warehouse. Some repairs to the Soundcraftsmen brand Lancer speakers were often done in the back room of the sales departments by the salesmen.

Yeomans also owned and operated a local audio-video store in Costa Mesa, California, called Atlantic Stereo. Atlantic still operates, but has no affiliation with Yeomans.

Gassett, the marketing entrepreneur, took the Soundcraftsmen equalizer, preamplifier and power amplifier nationally and internationally. It was Gassett, becoming President and CEO of Soundcraftsmen, who took the Coastron/Fedco "House Brand" from a few hundred thousand per year to a multimillion-dollar company. Gassett left in 1980 to expand his international business.

In 1991, the company was acquired by MTX and was renamed MTX Soundcraftsmen. In the mid-1990s MTX discontinued production of Soundcraftsmen components.
