= Camcorder =

Video camera with built-in video recorder

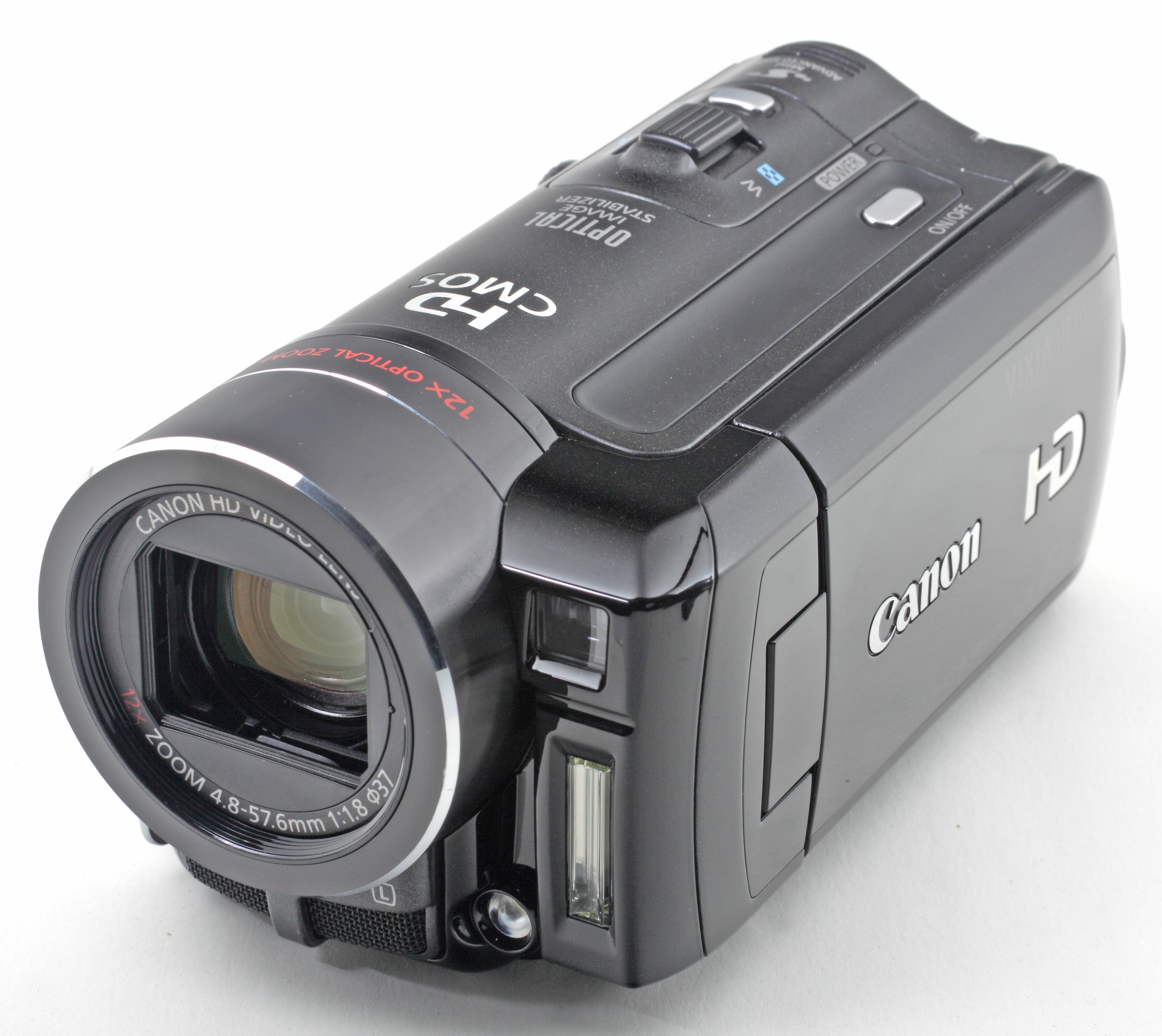
Canon VIXIA HF10 camcorder

A camcorder is a self-contained portable electronic device with video and audio recording as its primary function.

The earliest camcorders were tape-based, recording analog signals onto videotape cassettes. In the 2000s, digital recording became the norm, and additionally tape was replaced by storage media such as mini-HDD, MiniDVD, internal flash memory and SD cards.

More recent devices capable of recording video are camera phones and digital cameras primarily intended for still pictures, whereas dedicated camcorders are often equipped with more functions and interfaces than more common cameras, such as an internal optical zoom lens that is able to operate silently with no throttled speed, whereas cameras with protracting zoom lenses commonly throttle operation speed during video recording to minimize acoustic disturbance. Additionally, dedicated units are able to operate solely on external power with no battery inserted.

== Etymology ==
The Oxford English Dictionary records the first instance of the English word camcorder in The Economist in 1982. According to Stewart Wolpin, the word was coined by American electronics journalist David Lachenbruch in 1982 as a blend of camera and recorder. However, Garland Hampton Cannon and Nicholas W. Warren instead suggest that the word is derived from the Japanese kamukōdā (カムコーダー) using the English words camera and tape recorder, coined by Sony for export purposes in March 1982.

== History ==
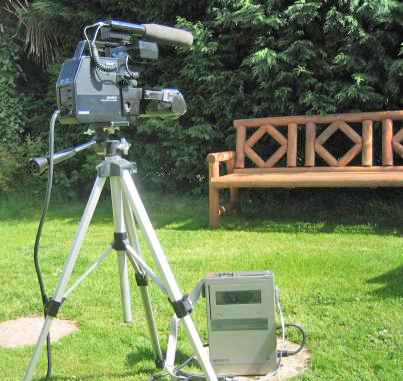
Prior to the camcorder, a portable recorder and camera would be required. This is a Sony SL-F1 Betamax recorder and video camera.

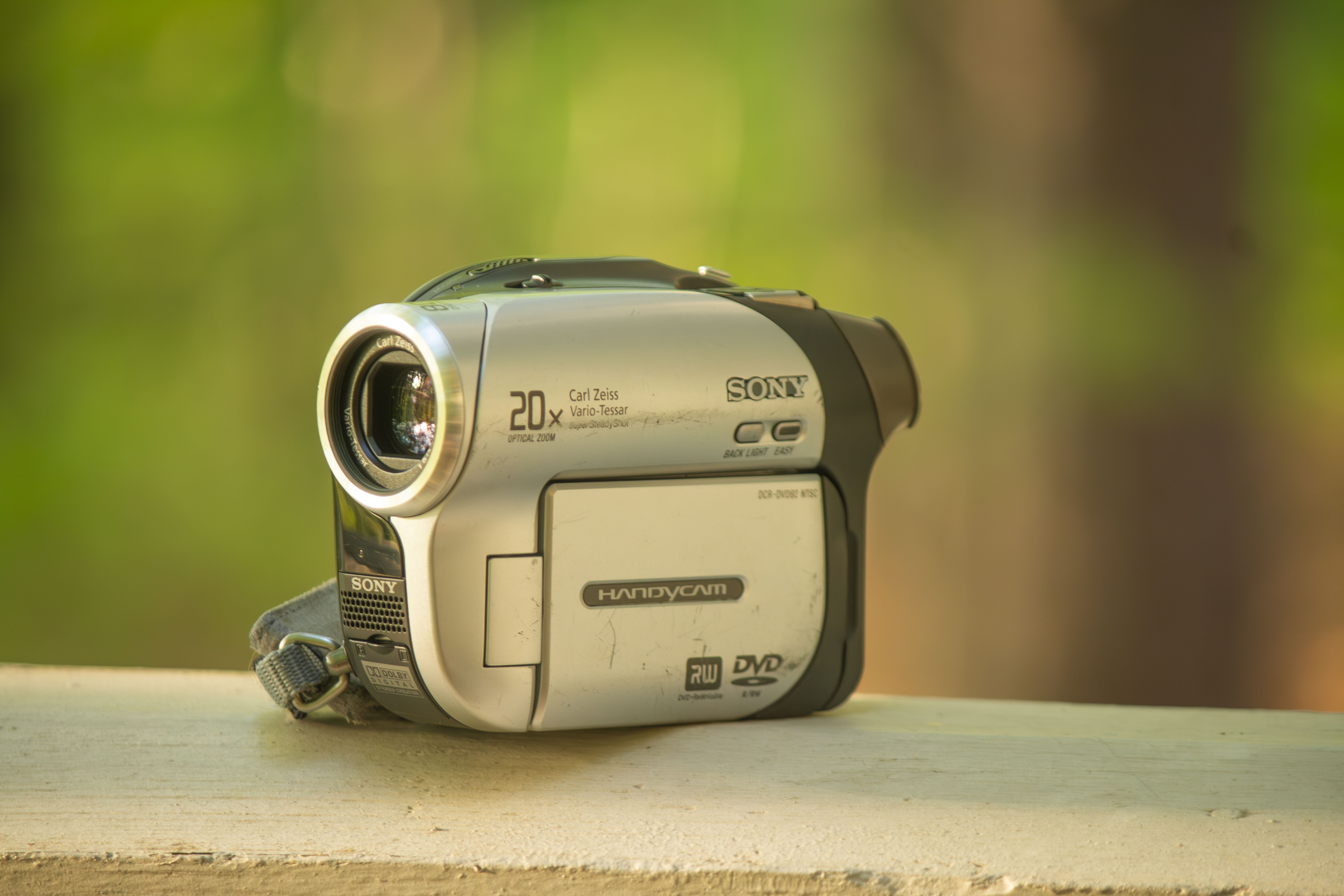
A Sony DCR-DVD92 DVD camcorder from 2005.

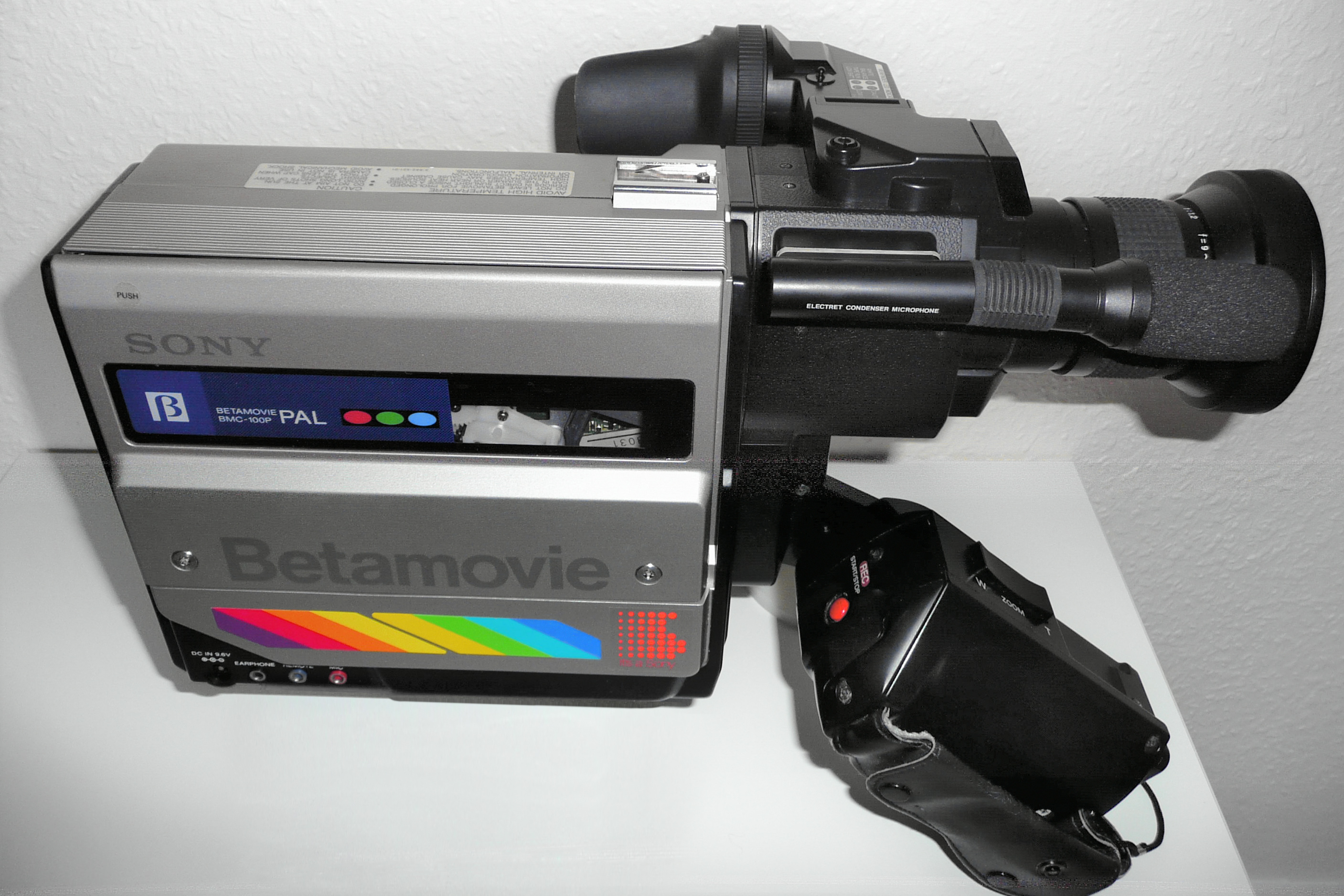
Sony Betamovie BMC-110 (BMC-100P in PAL markets) is the first consumer camcorder. Released in 1983 for the Betamax format. It has no playback functionality and is only capable of recording.

Video cameras originally designed for television broadcast were large and heavy, mounted on special pedestals and wired to remote recorders in separate rooms. As technology improved, out-of-studio video recording was possible with compact video cameras and portable video recorders; a detachable recording unit could be carried to a shooting location. Although the camera itself was compact, the need for a separate recorder made on-location shooting a two-person job. Specialized videocassette recorders were introduced by JVC (VHS) and Sony (U-matic, with Betamax) releasing a model for mobile work. Portable recorders meant that recorded video footage could be aired on the early-evening news, since it was no longer necessary to develop film.

In 1983, Sony released the first camcorder, the Betacam system, for professional use. A key component was a single camera-recorder unit, eliminating a cable between the camera and recorder and increasing the camera operator's freedom. The Betacam used the same cassette format (0.5 inches or 1.3 centimetres tape) as the Betamax, but with a different, incompatible recording format. It became standard equipment for broadcast news.

Sony released the first consumer camcorder in 1983, the Betamovie BMC-100P. It used a Betamax cassette and rested on the operator's shoulder, due to a design not permitting a single-handed grip. That year, JVC released the first VHS-C camcorder. Kodak announced a new camcorder format in 1984, the 8 mm video format. Sony introduced its compact 8 mm Video8 format in 1985. That year, Panasonic, RCA and Hitachi began producing camcorders using a full-size VHS cassette with a three-hour capacity. These shoulder-mount camcorders were used by videophiles, industrial videographers and college TV studios. Full-size Super-VHS (S-VHS) camcorders were released in 1987, providing an inexpensive way to collect news segments or other videographies. Sony upgraded Video8, releasing the Hi8 in competition with S-VHS.

Digital technology emerged with the 1986 Sony D1, a device which recorded uncompressed data and required a large amount of bandwidth for its time. In 1992 Ampex introduced DCT, the first digital video format with data compression using the discrete cosine transform algorithm present in most commercial digital video formats. In 1995 Sony, JVC, Panasonic and other video-camera manufacturers launched DV, which became a de facto standard for home video production, independent filmmaking and citizen journalism. That year, Ikegami introduced Editcam (the first tapeless video recording system).

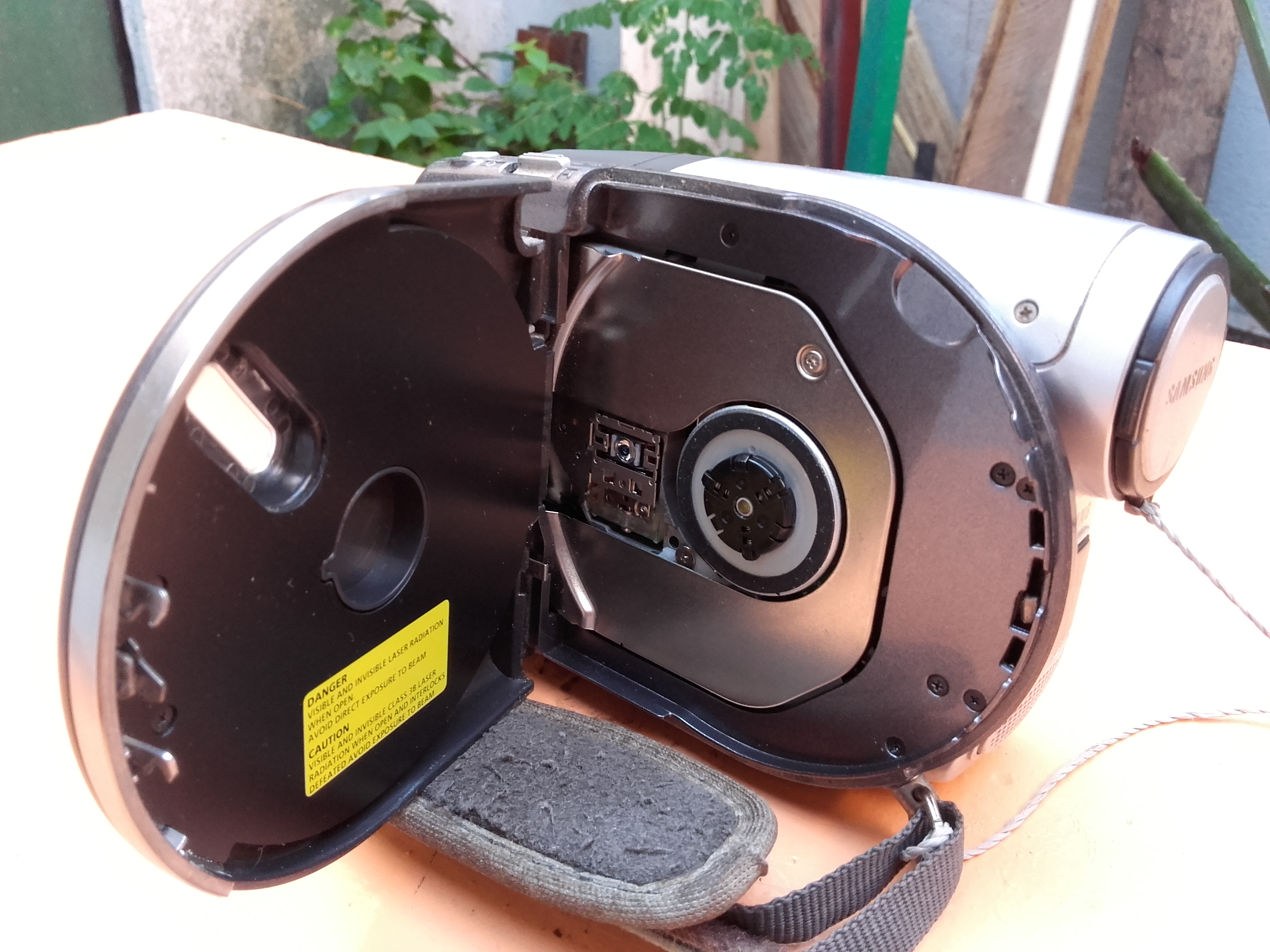
Camcorders using standard DVD media like this (or more commonly MiniDVD) were marketed in the 2000s.

Camcorders using DVD media were popular at the turn of the 21st century due to the convenience of being able to drop a disc into the family DVD player; however, DVD capability, due to the limitations of the format, is largely limited to consumer-level equipment targeted at people who are not likely to spend any great amount of effort video editing their video footage. Hitachi released the world's first DVD-RAM camcorder in 2000, using the more compact 8 cm MiniDVD.

=== High definition (HD) ===
The Sony HDVS system, launched in 1984, allowed 1080i recording in the late 1990s. Sony later released a HD version of Betacam called HDCAM in 1997.

Panasonic launched DVCPRO HD in 2000, expanding the DV codec to support high definition (HD). The format was intended for professional camcorders, and used full-size DVCPRO cassettes. In 2003 Sony, JVC, Canon and Sharp introduced HDV as the first affordable HD video format, due to its use of inexpensive MiniDV cassettes.

=== Tapeless ===
Sony introduced the XDCAM tapeless video format in 2003, introducing the Professional Disc (PFD). Panasonic followed in 2004 with its P2 solid state memory cards as a recording medium for DVCPRO-HD video. In 2006 Panasonic and Sony introduced AVCHD as an inexpensive, tapeless, high-definition video format. AVCHD camcorders are produced by Sony, Panasonic, Canon, JVC and Hitachi. About this time, some consumer grade camcorders with hard disk and/or memory card recording used MOD and TOD file formats, accessible by USB from a PC.

=== 3D ===
In 2010, after the success of James Cameron's 2009 3D film Avatar, full 1080p HD 3D camcorders entered the market. With the proliferation of file-based digital formats, the relationship between recording media and recording format has declined; video can be recorded onto different media. With tapeless formats, recording media are storage for digital files.

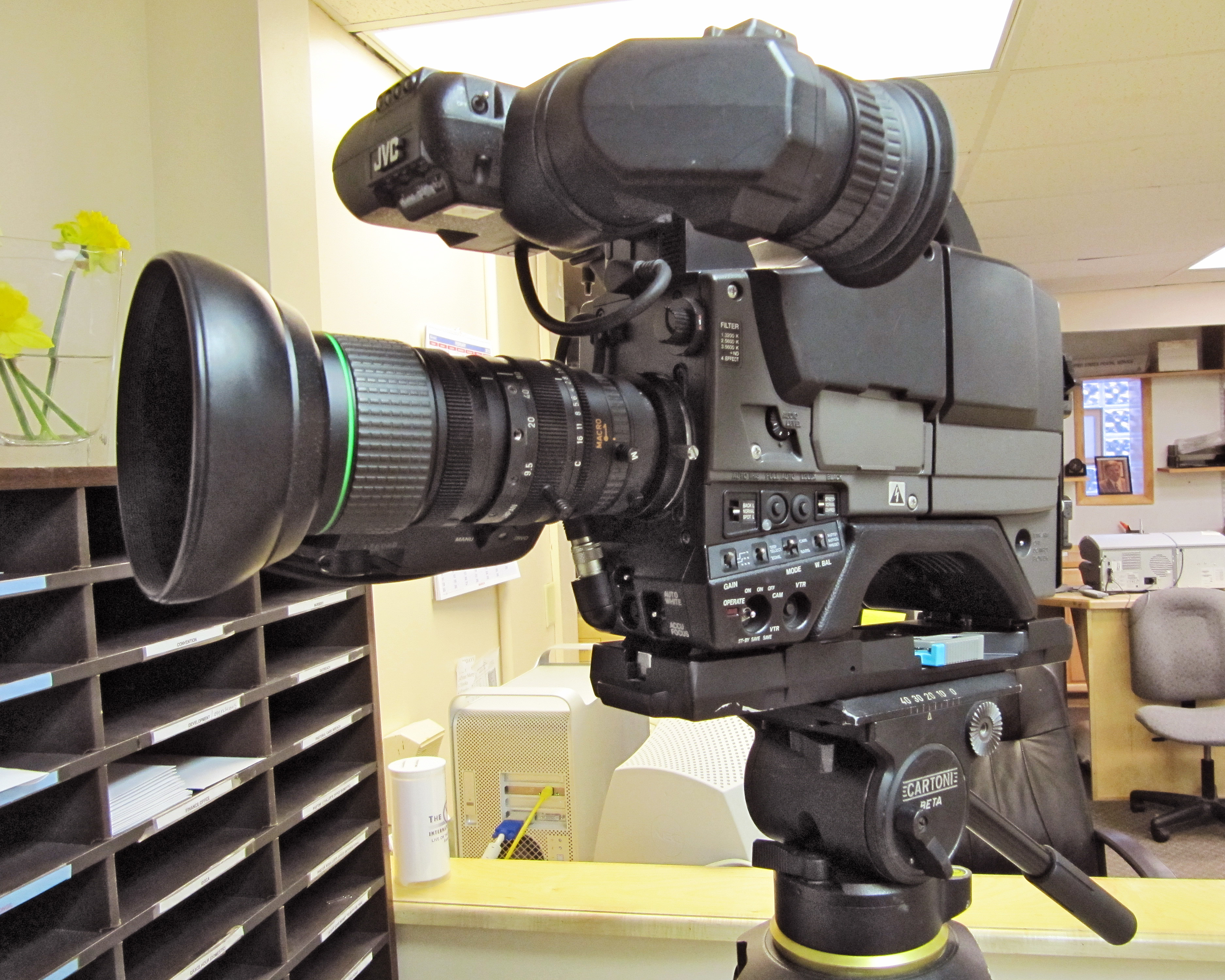
Professional-grade digital camcorder

In 2011 Panasonic, Sony, and JVC released consumer-grade camcorders capable of filming in 3D. Panasonic released the HDC-SDT750. It is a 2D camcorder which can shoot in HD; 3D is achieved by a detachable conversion lens. Sony released a 3D camcorder, the HDR-TD10, with two lenses built in for 3D filming, and can optionally shoot 2D video. Panasonic has also released 2D camcorders with an optional 3D conversion lens. The HDC-SD90, HDC-SD900, HDC-TM900 and HDC-HS900 are sold as "3D-ready": 2D camcorders, with optional 3D capability at a later date. JVC also released a twin-lens camcorder in 2011, JVC Everio GS-TD1.

=== 4K Ultra HD ===
In CES (January) 2014, Sony announced the second consumer/low-end professional ("prosumer") camcorder Sony FDR-AX100 with a 1" 20.9MP sensor able to shoot 4K video in 3840x2160 pixels 30fps or 24fps in the XAVC-S format; in standard HD the camcorder can also deliver 60fps. When using the traditional format AVCHD, the camcorder supports 5.1 surround sound from its built-in microphone, this is however not supported in the XAVC-S format. The camera also has a 3-step ND filter switch allowing greater control of how much light can enter the camera for maintaining a shallow depth of field or giving a softer appearance to motion. For one hour video shooting in 4K the camera needs about 32 GB to accommodate a data transfer rate of 50 Mbit/s. The camera's MSRP in the US is US$2,000.

In 2015, consumer UHD (3840x2160) camcorders below US$1000 became available. Sony released the FDRAX33, and Panasonic released the HC-WX970K and the HC-VX870.

In September 2014 Panasonic announced and claimed 4K Ultra HD Camcorder HC-X1000E as the first conventional camcorder design that can capture up to 60fps at 150 Mbit/s or alternatively standard HD recording at up to 200 Mbit/s in ALL-I mode with MP4, MOV and AVCHD formats all offered depending on the resolution and frame rate. With use 1/2.3" small sensor as commonly is used by bridge cameras, the camcorder has 20x optical zoom in a compact body with dual XLR audio inputs, Internal ND filters and separate control rings for focus, iris and zoom. In HD capture, the camcorder enables in-camera downscaling of the 4K image to HD to reduce noise inherent in the smaller sensor.

As of January 2017, the only major manufacturer to announce new consumer camcorders at CES (Consumer Electronic Show) in Las Vegas was Canon with its entry-level HD models. Panasonic only announced details regarding their Mirrorless Micro Four Thirds Digital Camera called the LUMIX GH5, capable of shooting 4K in 60p. This is the first time in decades that Panasonic and Sony have not announced new traditional camcorders at CES, and instead carried over 2016's models, such as Sony's FDR-AX53. This is due to there being far less demand in the market for traditional camcorders as more and more consumers prefer to record video with their 4K-capable smartphones, DSLRs, and action cameras from GoPro, Xiaomi, Sony, Nikon, and many others.

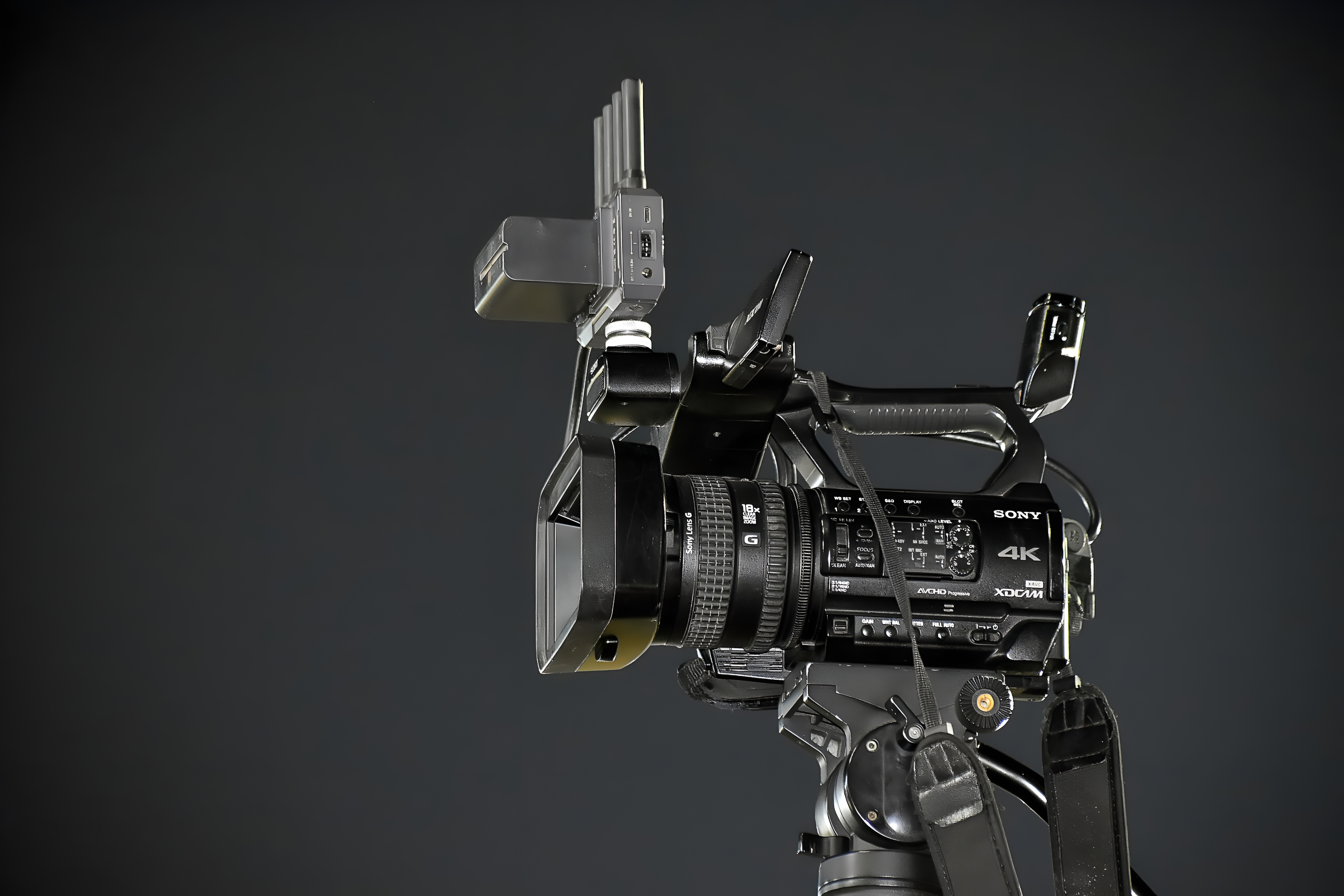
Sony professional 4K XDCAM camcorder

== Components ==
Camcorders have three major components: lens, imager and recorder. The lens gathers light, focusing it on the imager. The imager (usually a CCD or CMOS sensor; earlier models used vidicon tubes) converts incident light into an electrical signal. The recorder converts the electrical signal to video, encoding it in a storable form. The lens and imager comprise the "camera" section.

=== Lens ===
The lens is the first component of the light path. Camcorder optics generally have one or more of the following controls:

- Aperture (or iris): Regulates exposure and controls depth of field
- Zoom: Controls focal length and angle of view
- Shutter speed: Regulates exposure to maintain desired motion portrayal
- Gain: Amplifies signal strength in low-light conditions
- Neutral density filter: Regulates exposure intensity

In consumer units these adjustments are often automatically controlled by the camcorder, but can be adjusted manually if desired. Professional-grade units offer user control of all major optical functions.

=== Imager ===
The imager, often a CCD, or a photodiode array which may be an Active Pixel Sensor, converts light into an electrical signal. The camera lens projects an image onto the imager surface, exposing the photosensitive array to light. This light exposure is converted into an electrical charge. At the end of the timed exposure, the imager converts the accumulated charge into a continuous analog voltage at the imager's output terminals. After the conversion is complete, the photosites reset to start the exposure of the next video frame. In many cases the photosites (per pixel) are actually reset globally by charging to a fixed voltage, and discharged towards zero individually proportionally to the accumulated light, because it is simpler to manufacture the sensor that way.

Most camcorders use a single imaging sensor with integrated colour filters, per pixel, to enable red, green and blue to be sensed, each on their own set of pixels. The individual pixel filters present a significant manufacturing challenge. However some camcorders, even consumer grade devices such as the JVC GZ-HD3, introduced around 2007, are triple sensor cameras, usually CCD but could be CMOS. In this case the exact alignment of the three sensors so that the red, green and blue components of the video output are correctly aligned, is the manufacturing challenge.

=== Recorder ===
The recorder writes the video signal onto a recording medium, such as magnetic videotape. Since the record function involves many signal-processing steps, some distortion and noise historically appeared on the stored video; playback of the stored signal did not have the exact characteristics and detail as a live video feed. All camcorders have a recorder-controlling section, allowing the user to switch the recorder into playback mode for reviewing recorded footage, and an image-control section controlling exposure, focus and color balance.

The image recorded need not be limited to what appeared in the viewfinder. For documenting events (as in law enforcement), the field of view overlays the time and date of the recording along the top and bottom of the image. The police car or constable badge number to which the recorder was given, the car's speed at the time of recording, compass direction and geographical coordinates may also be seen.

== Functionality ==
Dedicated camcorders are usually equipped with optical image stabilization, optical zoom, stereo microphone, and touch screen.

Additional possible features include a viewfinder (usually digital), a pressure-sensitive knob for zooming at a controllable speed, LED lamp for illuminating in darkness – possibly with an option to adjust automatically, night vision which may be assisted by an infrared lamp, still photography, the ability to capture still photos while filming – usually at a higher resolution than the video, the ability to lock the OIS on far subjects while zoomed in (named "OIS Lock" by Panasonic), the ability to buffer footage before pressing the "record" button to avoid missing moments without having to be constantly recording (named "PRE-REC" by Panasonic), the ability to keep the lens cover open for few minutes into stand-by mode for rapid restarting, internal storage for recording when the inserted memory card's space is exhausted, autofocus able to track objects, and optional visual effects during video recording and playback.^{:p37}

Metadata such as date/time and technical parameters may be stored in a separate subtitle track. The former allows measuring the exact and undistorted recording time of scenes even if intermittently paused, and the latter may encompass aperture, frames' exposure duration, exposure value, and photosensitivity.

On digital camcorders, the video resolution, frame rate, and/or bit rate may be adjustable between higher quality but larger file sizes and lower quality but extended recording time on remaining storage. The image sensor may have a higher resolution than the recorded video, allowing for lossless digital zoom by cropping the area read out from the image sensor.

The video player may allow for navigation between individual frames and extraction of still frames from footage to standalone pictures.

== Types ==
=== Analog and digital ===
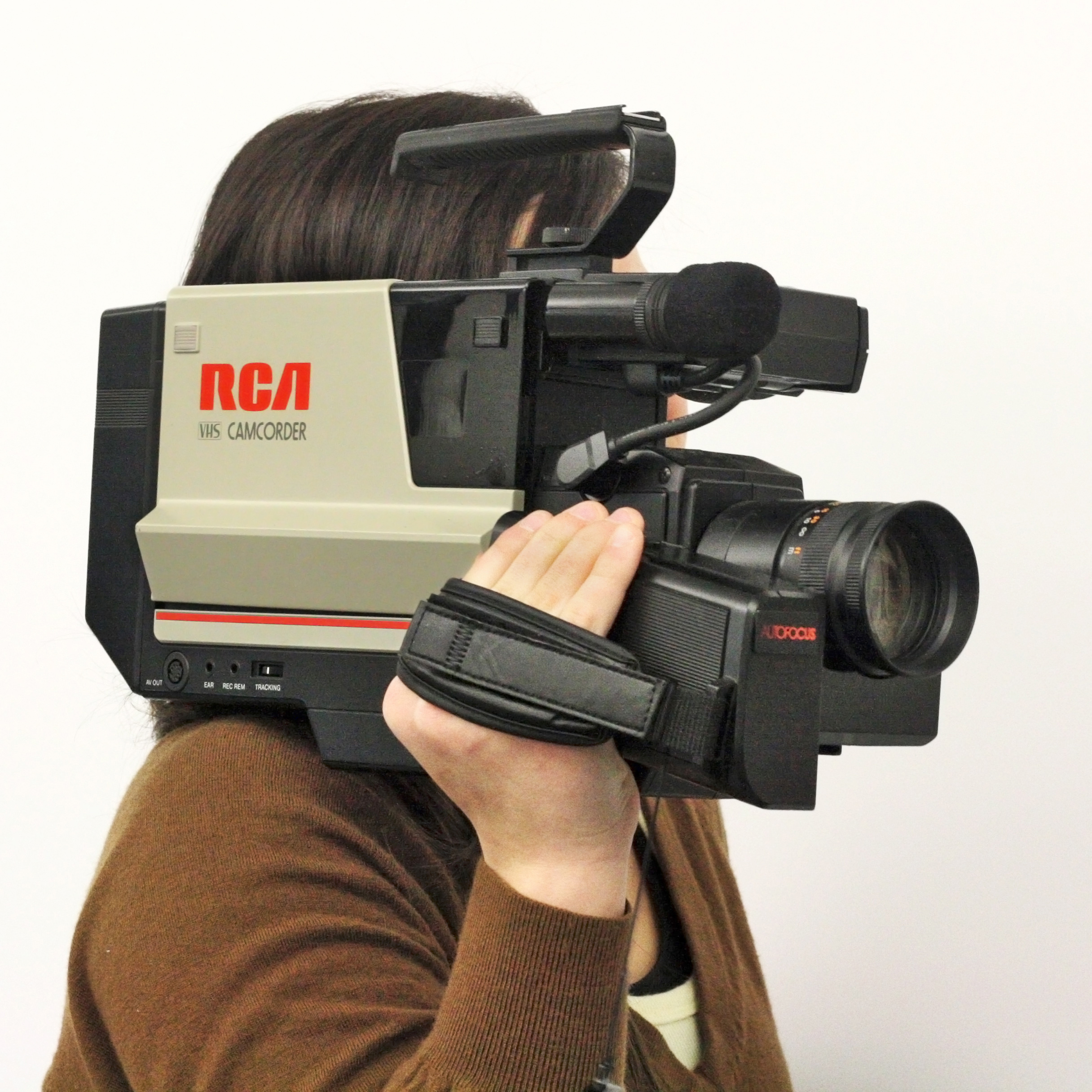
This older RCA camcorder records on standard analog VHS media. Its bulk—partly due to the use of full-size VHS cassettes—makes it more suited to shoulder-mounted use, as seen here.

Camcorders are often classified by their storage device; VHS, VHS-C, Betamax, Video8 are examples of late 20th century videotape-based camcorders which record video in analog form. Digital video camcorder formats include Digital8, MiniDV, DVD, hard disk drive, direct to disk recording and solid-state, semiconductor flash memory. While all these formats record video in digital form, Digital8, MiniDV, DVD and hard-disk drives have no longer been manufactured in consumer camcorders since 2006.

In the earliest analog camcorders the imaging device is vacuum-tube technology, in which the charge of a light-sensitive target was directly proportional to the amount of light striking it; the Vidicon is an example of such an imaging tube. Newer analog, and digital camcorders use a solid-state charge-coupled imaging device (CCD) or a CMOS imager. Both are analog detectors, using photodiodes to pass a current proportional to the light striking them. The current is then digitised before being electronically scanned and fed to the imager's output. The main difference between the two devices is how the scanning is done. In the CCD the diodes are sampled simultaneously, and the scan passes the digitised data from one register to the next. In CMOS devices, the diodes are sampled directly by the scanning logic.

Digital video storage retains higher-quality video than analog storage, especially on the prosumer and strictly consumer levels. MiniDV storage allows full-resolution video (720x576 for PAL, 720x480 for NTSC), unlike analog consumer-video standards. Digital video does not experience colour bleeding, jitter, or fade.

Unlike analog formats, digital formats do not experience generation loss during copying; however, they are more prone to complete loss. Although digital information can theoretically be stored indefinitely without deterioration, some digital formats (like MiniDV) place tracks only about 10 micrometers apart (compared with 19–58 μm for VHS). A digital recording is more vulnerable to wrinkles or stretches in the tape which could erase data, but tracking and error-correction code on the tape compensates for most defects. On analog media, similar damage registers as "noise" in the video, leaving a deteriorated (but watchable) video. DVDs may develop DVD rot, losing large chunks of data. An analog recording may be "usable" after its storage media deteriorates severely, but slight media degradation in digital recordings may trigger an "all or nothing" failure; the digital recording will be unplayable without extensive restoration.

=== Recording media ===
Older digital camcorders record video onto tape digitally, microdrives, hard drives, and small DVD-RAM or DVD-Rs. Newer machines since 2006 record video onto flash memory devices and internal solid-state drives in MPEG-1, MPEG-2 or MPEG-4 format. Because these codecs use inter-frame compression, frame-specific editing requires frame regeneration, additional processing and may lose picture information. Codecs storing each frame individually, easing frame-specific scene editing, are common in professional use.

Other digital consumer camcorders record in DV or HDV format on tape, transferring content over FireWire or USB 2.0 to a computer where large files (for DV, 1 GB for 4 to 4.6 minutes in PAL/NTSC resolutions) can be edited, converted and recorded back to tape. The transfer is done in real time, so the transfer of a 60-minute tape requires one hour to transfer and about 13 GB of disk space for the raw footage (plus space for rendered files and other media).

==== Tapeless ====
A tapeless camcorder is a camcorder that does not use video tape for the digital recording of video productions as 20th century ones did. Tapeless camcorders record video as digital computer files onto data storage devices such as optical discs, hard disk drives and solid-state flash memory cards.

Inexpensive pocket video cameras use flash memory cards, while some more expensive camcorders use solid-state drives or SSD; similar flash technology is used on semi-pro and high-end professional video cameras for ultrafast transfer of high-definition television (HDTV) content.

Most consumer-level tapeless camcorders use MPEG-2, MPEG-4 or its derivatives as video coding formats. They are normally capable of still-image capture to JPEG format additionally.

Consumer-grade tapeless camcorders include a USB port to transfer video onto a computer. Professional models include other options like Serial digital interface (SDI) or HDMI. Some tapeless camcorders are equipped with a FireWire (IEEE-1394) port to ensure compatibility with magnetic tape-based DV and HDV formats.

=== Consumer market ===
Since the consumer market favors ease of use, portability and price, most consumer-grade camcorders emphasize handling and automation over audio and video performance. Most devices with camcorder capability are camera phones or compact digital cameras, in which video is a secondary capability. Some pocket cameras, mobile phones and camcorders are shock-, dust- and waterproof.

The consumer camcorder was generally still very expensive throughout the early to mid 1990s, but prices compared to the 1980s had halved for an entry-level model and fell even further at the turn of the millennium, placing them in easier reach of basic-income consumers with the addition of available and more easy to obtain credit to spread payments.

This market has followed an evolutionary path driven by miniaturization and cost reduction enabled by progress in design and manufacture. Miniaturization reduces the imager's ability to gather light; designers have balanced improvements in sensor sensitivity with size reduction, shrinking the camera imager and optics while maintaining relatively noise-free video in daylight. Indoor or dim-light shooting is generally quiet, and in such conditions artificial lighting is recommended. Mechanical controls cannot shrink below a certain size, and manual camera operation has given way to camera-controlled automation for every shooting parameter (including focus, aperture, shutter speed and color balance). The few models with manual override are menu-driven. Outputs include USB 2.0, Composite and S-Video and IEEE 1394/FireWire (for MiniDV models).

The high end of the consumer market emphasizes user control and advanced shooting modes. More-expensive consumer camcorders offer manual exposure control, HDMI output and external audio input, progressive-scan frame rates (24fps, 25fps, 30fps) and higher-quality lenses than basic models. To maximize low-light capability, color reproduction and frame resolution, multi-CCD/CMOS camcorders mimic the 3-element imager design of professional equipment. Field tests have shown that most consumer camcorders (regardless of price) produce noisy video in low light.

Before the 21st century, video editing required two recorders and a desktop video workstation to control them. A typical home personal computer can hold several hours of standard-definition video, and is fast enough to edit footage without additional upgrades. Most consumer camcorders are sold with basic video editing software, so users can create their own DVDs or share edited footage online.

Since 2006, nearly all camcorders sold are digital. Tape-based (MiniDV/HDV) camcorders are no longer popular, since tapeless models (with an SD card or internal SSD) cost almost the same but offer greater convenience; video captured on an SD card can be transferred to a computer faster than digital tape. None of the consumer-class camcorders announced at the 2006 International Consumer Electronics Show recorded on tape.

=== Other devices ===
Video-capture capability is not confined to camcorders. Cellphones, digital single-lens reflex and compact digicams, laptops and personal media players offer video-capture capability, but most multipurpose devices offer less video-capture functionality than an equivalent camcorder. Most lack manual adjustments, audio input, autofocus and zoom. Few capture in standard TV-video formats (480p60, 720p60, 1080i30), recording in either non-TV resolutions (320x240, 640x480) or slower frame rates (15 or 30 fps).

A multipurpose device used as a camcorder offers inferior handling, audio and video performance, which limits its utility for extended or adverse shooting situations. The camera phone developed video capability during the early 21st century, reducing sales of low-end camcorders.

DSLR cameras with high-definition video were also introduced early in the 21st century. Although they still have the handling and usability deficiencies of other multipurpose devices, HDSLR video offers the shallow depth-of-field and interchangeable lenses lacking in consumer camcorders. Professional video cameras with these capabilities are more expensive than the most expensive video-capable DSLR. In video applications where the DSLR's operational deficiencies can be mitigated, DSLRs such as the Canon 5D Mark II provide depth-of-field and optical-perspective control.

Combo-cameras combine full-feature still cameras and camcorders in a single unit. The Sanyo Xacti HD1 was the first such unit, combining the features of a 5.1 megapixel still camera with a 720p video recorder with improved handling and utility. Canon and Sony have introduced camcorders with still-photo performance approaching that of a digicam, and Panasonic has introduced a DSLR body with video features approaching that of a camcorder. Hitachi has introduced the DZHV 584E/EW, with 1080p resolution and a touch screen.

=== Flip Video ===
The Flip Video was a series of tapeless camcorders introduced by Pure Digital Technologies in 2006. Slightly larger than a smartphone, the Flip Video was a basic camcorder with record, zoom, playback and browse buttons and a USB jack for uploading video. The original models recorded at a 640x480-pixel resolution; later models featured HD recording at 1280x720 pixels. The Mino was a smaller Flip Video, with the same features as the standard model. The Mino was the smallest of all camcorders, slightly wider than a MiniDV cassette and smaller than most smartphones on the market. In fact the Mino was small enough to fit inside the shell of a VHS cassette. Later HD models featured larger screens. In 2011, the Flip Video (more recently manufactured by Cisco) was discontinued.

=== Interchangeable lenses ===
Interchangeable-lens camcorders can capture HD video with DSLR lenses and an adapter.

=== Built-in projector ===
In 2011, Sony launched its HDR-PJ range of HD camcorders: the HDR-PJ10, 30 and 50. Known as Handycams, they were the first camcorders to incorporate a small image projector on the side of the unit. This feature allows a group of viewers to watch video without a television, a full-size projector or a computer. These camcorders were a huge success and Sony subsequently released further models in this range. Sony's 2014 line up comprises the HDR-PJ240, HDR-PJ330 (entry-level models), HDR-PJ530 (mid-range model) and the HDR-PJ810 (top of the range). Specifications vary by model.

== Formats ==
The following list covers consumer equipment only (for other formats, see videotape):

=== Analog ===
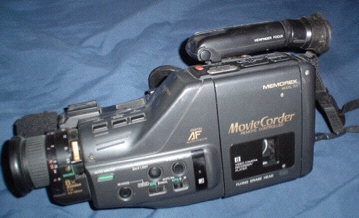
Video8 Camcorder

Lo-Band: Approximately 3 MHz bandwidth (250 lines EIA resolution, or ~333x480 edge-to-edge)

- BCE (1954): First tape storage for video, manufactured by Bing Crosby Entertainment from Ampex equipment
- BCE Color (1955): First color tape storage for video, manufactured by Bing Crosby Entertainment from Ampex equipment
- Simplex (1955): Developed commercially by RCA and used to record live broadcasts by NBC
- Quadruplex videotape (1955): Developed formally by Ampex, this was the recording standard for 20 years.
- Vision electronic recording apparatus (Vera) (1955): An experimental recording standard developed by the BBC, it was never used or sold commercially.
- U-matic (1971): Tape originally used by Sony to record video
- U-matic S (1974): A smaller version of U-matic, used for portable recorders
- Betamax (1975): Used on old Sony and Sanyo camcorders and portables; obsolete by the late 1980s in the consumer market
- VHS (1976): Compatible with VHS VCRs; no longer manufactured
- VHS-C (1982): Originally designed for portable VCRs, this standard was later adapted for compact consumer camcorders; identical in quality to VHS; cassettes play in VHS VCRs with an adapter. Still available in the low-end consumer market. Relatively short running time compared to other formats.
- Video8 (1985): Small-format tape developed by Sony to compete with VHS-C's palm-sized design; equivalent to VHS or Betamax in picture quality

Hi-Band: Approximately 5 MHz bandwidth (420 lines EIA resolution, or ~ 550x480 edge-to-edge)

- U-matic BVU (1982): Largely used in high-end consumer and professional equipment
- U-matic BVU-SP (1985): Largely used in high-end consumer and professional equipment
- S-VHS (1987): Largely used in mid-range consumer and prosumer equipment
- S-VHS-C (1987): Limited to low-end consumer market
- Hi8 (1988): Used in low to mid-range consumer equipment but also was available as prosumer/industrial equipment

=== Digital ===
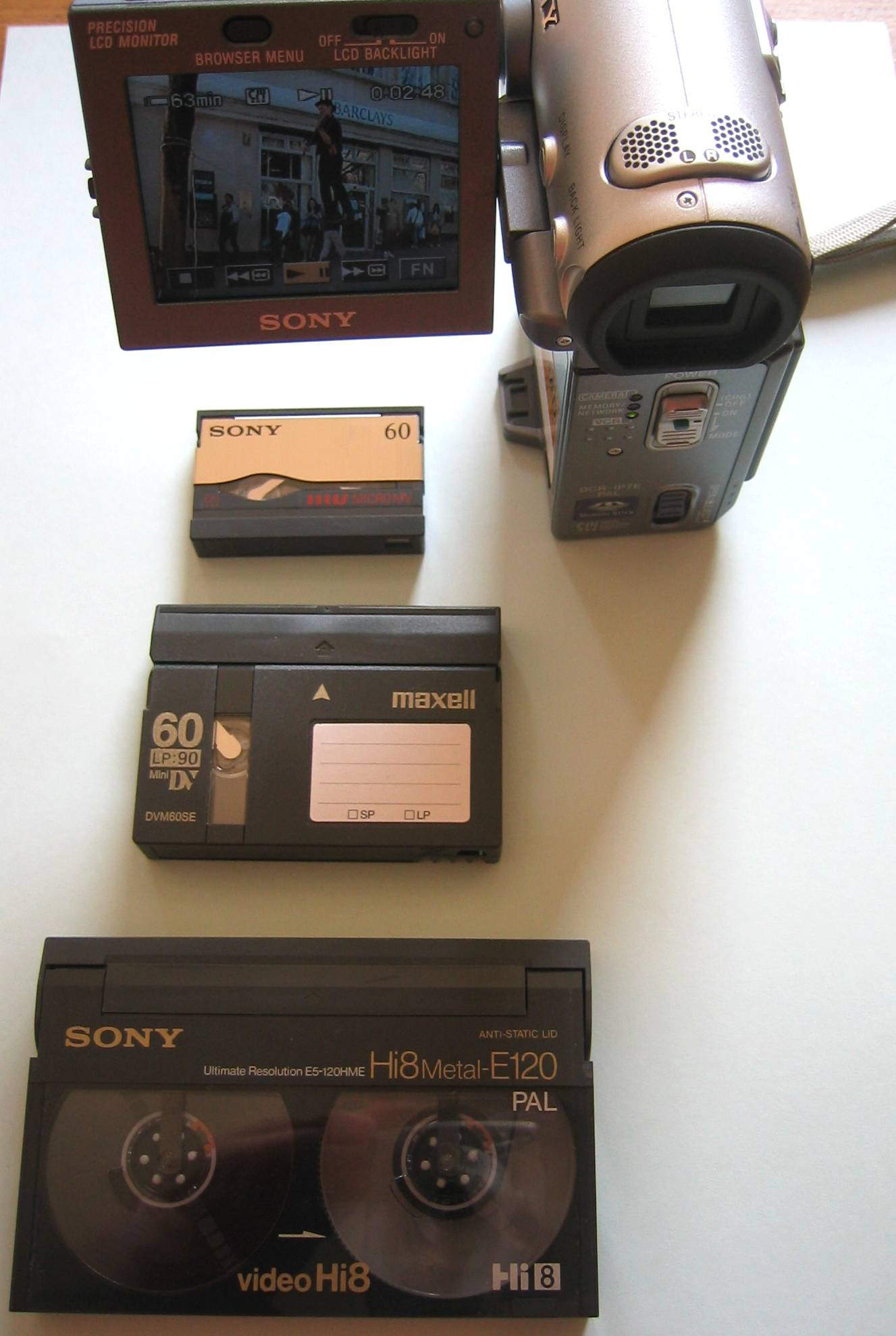
Sony Handycam DCR-IP7BT MICROMV camcorder and Sony MICROMV tape (top), compared with MiniDV and Hi8 tapes

- DV (1995): Initially developed by Sony, the DV standard became the most widespread standard-definition digital camcorder technology for the next decade. Users could connect their DV camcorders to their computers, using 4- or 6-pin FireWire sockets then common on computers.
- DVCPRO (1995): Panasonic released its own variant of the DV format for broadcast news-gathering.
- DVCAM (1996): Sony's answer to the DVCPRO
- DVD recordable (1996): A variety of recordable optical disc standards were released by multiple manufacturers during the 1990s and 2000s, of which DVD-RAM was the first. The most common in camcorders was MiniDVD-R, which used recordable 8 cm discs holding 30 minutes of MPEG video.
- D-VHS (1998): JVC's VHS tape supporting 720p/1080i HD; many units also supported IEEE 1394 recording.
- Digital8 (1999): Uses Hi8 tapes; most can read older Video8 and Hi8 analog tapes.
- MICROMV (2001): Matchbox-sized cassette. Sony was the only electronics manufacturer for this format, and editing software was proprietary to Sony and only available on Microsoft Windows; however, open source programmers did manage to create capture software for Linux.
- Blu-ray (2003): Manufactured by Hitachi
- HDV (2004): Records up to an hour of HDTV MPEG-2 signal on a MiniDV cassette
- MPEG-2 codec-based format: Records MPEG-2 program stream or MPEG-2 transport stream to various kinds of tapeless standard and HD media (hard disks, solid-state memory, etc.).
- H.264: Compressed video using the H.264 codec in an MPEG-4 file; usually stored in tapeless media
- AVCHD: Puts H.264 video into a transport-stream file format; compressed in H.264 format (not MPEG-4)
- Multiview Video Coding: Amendment to H.264/MPEG-4 AVC video compression for sequences captured from multiple cameras using a single video stream; backwards-compatible with H.264

== Operating systems ==
Since most manufacturers focus their support on Windows and Mac users, users of other operating systems have difficulty finding support for their devices. However, open-source products such as Kdenlive, Cinelerra and Kino (written for the Linux operating system) allow editing of most popular digital formats on alternative operating systems and can be used in conjunction with OBS for online broadcast solutions; software to edit DV streams is available on most platforms.

== Digital forensics ==
The issue of digital-camcorder forensics to recover data (e.g. video files with timestamps) has been addressed.

== See also ==
- 3CCD
- AVCHD
- Charge-coupled device
- CMOS
- Dew warning
- FireWire
- Flip Video
- PictBridge
- Pocket video camera
- Professional video camera
- PXL2000—A toy camcorder that used compact audio cassette to store video
- SteadyShot
- USB streaming and USB port.
- VTR
- List of Sony camcorders
- List of Panasonic camcorders
