= Pocket video camera =

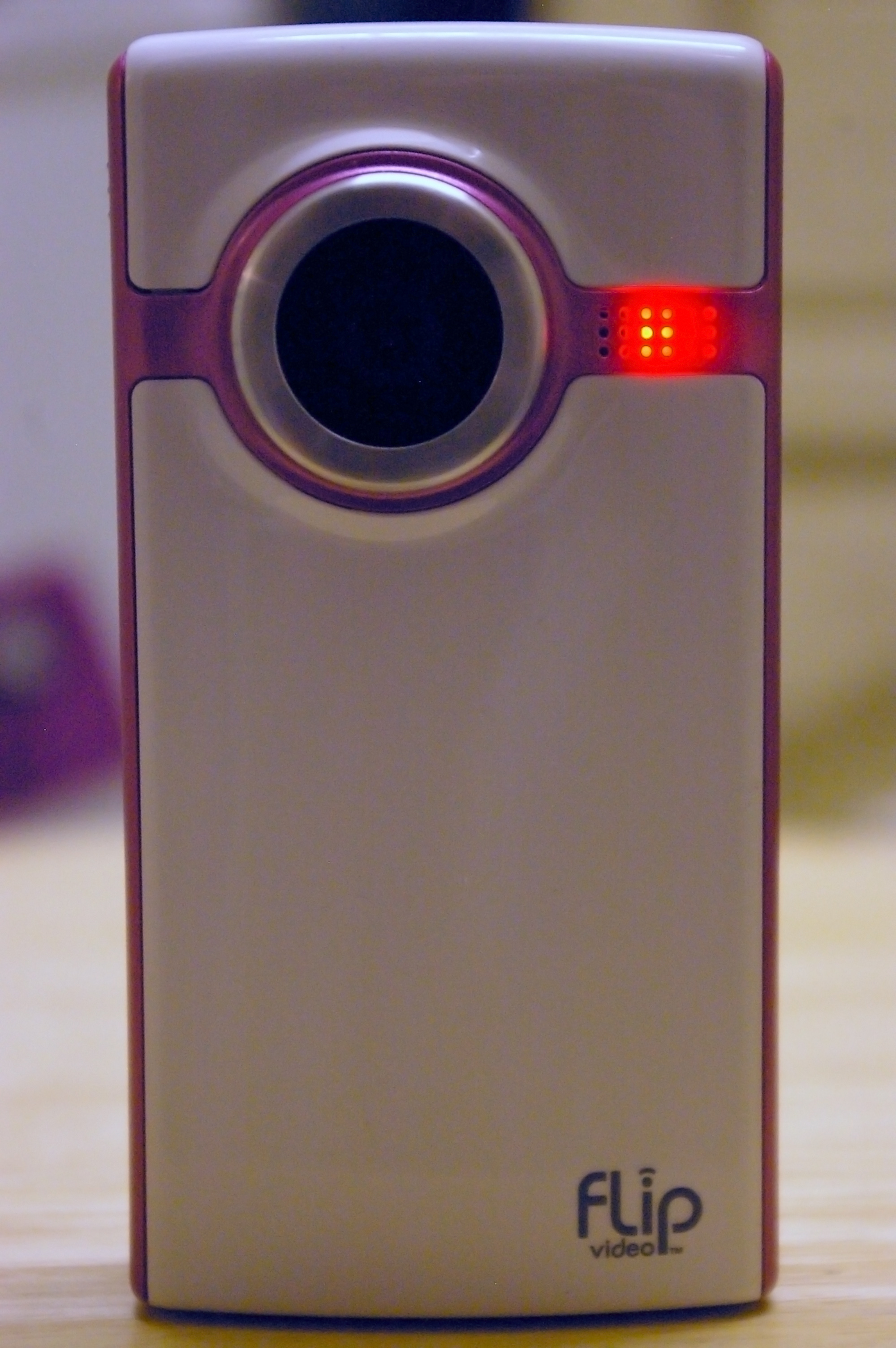
The Flip Video Ultra camera

A pocket video camera is a tapeless camcorder that is small enough to be carried in one's pocket.

A typical pocket video camera has an LCD screen of at least 1.5", the ability to capture either only standard video or both standard video and high-definition video (H.264/MPEG-4 AVC), at least 128MB of internal memory and a Secure Digital (SD) card extension or at least 4GB internal memory with no SD card slot. Power may be supplied by a proprietary Ni-MH rechargeable battery or 2 standard AA batteries. Dimensions 2.5 x 4.5 x 0.9 in and a weight of 3.8 oz are typical, and a USB connector is usually built-in.

Pocket camcorders weigh only from 0.2 to 0.4 lbs and fit neatly into any pocket or purse for ultra portability. Examples include the Creative Vado HD and the Flip Video. The Sony Bloggie MHS-PM5 can shoot video in Full HD and has 4x digital zoom. The Sanyo Xacti PD1 can shoot video in Full HD 1080p at 30fps, with stereo audio and has 3x optical zoom.

By 2012 they had largely been displaced by improvements in camera phones. They have also been succeeded by action cameras and stabilized handheld cameras with built-in gimbals, such as the DJI Osmo Pocket series.

== See also ==
- Action camera
