= Abt Electronics =

Electronic retailer

- Type: Private
- Industry: Retailing
- Founded: 1936
- Founder: David Abt; Jewel Abt
- Headquarters: Glenview, Illinois, U.S.
- Products: Consumer Electronics; Appliances
- Revenue: $400 million (2021 est.)
- Number of employees: 1,650 (2022)
- Website: Official website

Abt Electronics is an independent family-owned retailer in the United States of consumer electronics, major appliances, and furniture. Abt operates 880,000 square feet at a single location in Glenview, Illinois, on 70 acres (280,000 m^{2}) of land ("... 1,200-employee.. 350,000-square-foot location on 37 acres...2015), and online since 1997. Abt Electronics now distributes products from coast to coast in the US. The company has operated in the Chicago market since 1936.

== History ==
In the early 1930s, Mr. Abt sold radios at the old Fair Store on State Street. He wanted to go into the grocery business, but his wife, Jewel, vetoed the idea because she knew the inventory could spoil and he would have to get up at 3 a.m. to go to the market. Instead, they opened Abt Radio in the Logan Square neighborhood.

Abt Electronics was founded in 1936 when Jewel (née Fischman) Abt gave $800 to her husband David Abt to start a business. The store was originally named Abt Radio as it only sold small electronics in its early days. The original location was a small storefront and service department in the Logan Square area of Chicago. Abt Electronics has expanded many times over the years. Abt electronics currently employs more than 1,650 employees in a 450,000 square feet retail store and warehouse in Glenview, Illinois, a suburb of Chicago. In May 2021, Abt announced plans for a 430,000 square-foot addition to their warehouse, effectively doubling the total area of their facility. Construction on the addition is expected to be completed in October 2021.

=== Timeline ===
- 1936 - Jewel and Dave Abt open Abt Radio with $800, located at 2835 N. Milwaukee, Chicago, selling small electronics
- 1953 - Bob Abt (former CEO; died July 23, 2015) begins working at Abt Radio part-time and over summers.
- 1955 - Abt moves to Logan Square Location at 2858 N. Milwaukee Ave., Chicago. Merchandise is kept off-site at the Hollander warehouse. One van made all the deliveries.
- 1971 - The Abt family opens a store in Niles, Illinois.
- 1977 - The Logan Square location closes.
- 1986 - Abt expands the Niles location, doubling in size from 12,000 to 24,000 square feet (2,200 m^{2}).
- 1990 - The Niles store closes on December 9.
- 1990 - Abt's fourth location, in Morton Grove, Illinois, opens for business December 10.
- 1990 - Recycling program begins.
- 1997 - Abt.com was launches. Abt becomes an authorized online retailer for brands like Sony, Panasonic, Toshiba, Bose, and Onkyo.
- 2002 - Abt closes the Morton Grove store. On May 26 Abt's fifth location, in Glenview, Illinois, opens for business.
- 2005 - May 25, the city of Chicago dedicates the corner of Wolfram and Milwaukee Ave. to Jewel and David Abt. The new corner is called Jewel and David Abt Way.
- 2008 - Jewel and David Abt are inducted into the 2008 Consumer Electronics Hall of Fame.
- 2008 - The Abt Design Center opens in June.
- 2008 - The 10,000-square-foot (930 m^{2}) recycling center opens in October.
- 2008 - Abt is chosen as the Chicago Tribune's Top Workplace in Chicago.
- 2009 - Abt's Mobile Installation department is voted one of the top 100 best retailers and installers from Mobile Electronics Inc.
- 2010 - Abt is chosen as the 2010 Dealer of the Year by home automation company Control4
- 2010 - Abt is voted in the top 10 of Chicago Tribune's "Top Chicago Workplaces" for the best place to work in the Chicago area.
- 2010-2020 - Voted the "Best Place to Buy Large Appliances" by Consumer Reports for eleven consecutive years
- 2011 - Voted the #1 place to work in Chicago Tribune's "Top Chicago Workplaces"
- 2012 - Voted the #1 place to work in Chicago Tribune's "Top Chicago Workplaces"
- 2013 - Voted the #20 place to work for nationwide by WorkplaceDynamics
- 2016 - Voted the #1 place to work in Chicago Tribune's "Top Chicago Workplaces"
- 2016 - Receives the Better Business Bureau Torch Award for Marketplace Ethics
- 2016 - Abt completes installation of a 1500-panel rooftop solar array, capable of producing 850 megawatts of power per year
- 2020 - Receives the Better Business Bureau Torch Award for Marketplace Ethics
- 2021 - Abt's new 30,000 square foot recycling center opens
- 2021 - Abt is voted one of Consumer Reports' "Best Place to Buy Small Appliances"
- 2021 - Construction starts on a new 429,524-square-foot building addition that will double Abt's warehouse space

== Environmental practices ==
In 2006, Abt built a recycling center which collects the company's used cardboard, plastic and plastic-foam packaging and prepares it to be sold for recycling. Abt opened a new, 30,000 square-foot recycling center in 2021. The company's recycling program prevents an estimated 2.2 million pounds of cardboard, 350,000 pounds of styrofoam, 1.4 million pounds of electronics, and 13 million pounds of appliances from ending up in landfills. In October 2016, Abt completed work on a rooftop solar panel array. The system comprises more than 1,500 solar panels and has an annual production capacity of 645,000 kWh electricity. The energy produced by the solar array powers regular building operations and is stored in a 500 kW Tesla PowerPack battery cluster.
