= Jack Wayman =

American businessman (1922–2014)

Norman Jack Wayman (May 12, 1922 – August 30, 2014) was a sixty-year veteran of the consumer electronics industry and served as president and CEO of the organization now called the Consumer Electronics Association (CEA) from 1962 to 1983. Wayman is best known for creating the International Consumer Electronics Show in 1967. CES is now the United States' largest annual event and the world's largest consumer technology trade show.

== Biography ==
Jack Wayman was born in Miami in the 1920s, the only child of a successful home builder, particularly in South Beach, and the family grew up on an island between Miami and Miami Beach. After graduating from Davidson College in 1943, Wayman was drafted into the Army, and served as an infantry captain during the Normandy Invasion.

== Early career ==
Wayman returned to Miami after leaving the military and became personal assistant to Arthur Vining Davis, who at the time was Chairman of Alcoa, Chairman of Alcoa Fruit Company, and founder of Arvida Properties. After two years Davis encouraged him to enroll in Georgetown University's School of Foreign Service. During his time at Georgetown, Wayman worked days in a local electronics store called Lacy's and took classes at night.

In 1952 Wayman was recruited by RCA to be distributor salesman for Southern Wholesalers, a six-state RCA distributor in Washington, DC. This role eventually expanded to a position as RCA's advertising manager and trade show manager, where he produced semi-annual shows for the company's 100 retail accounts. After ten years with RCA, he became Staff Director for the twelve-member Home Electronics Section of the Electronics Industry Association. Within a year, the Home Electronics Section had been renamed Consumer Products Division and Wayman had grown the trade group's membership to 25.

== Consumer Electronics Show ==
By the mid 1960s, transistors were coming in from Japanese manufacturers and color TVs had finally sold the first million sets. Wayman saw the need for an industry trade show, much like the show radio manufacturers had in the 1920s and 1930s, where the middlemen and distributors could come and see the new products. Wayman presented the idea to his Board, but they initially rejected the idea out of fear that Japanese manufacturers would steal their executives and designs. But Wayman was persistent and after three board meetings, the Consumer Electronics Show (CES) was finally approved although RCA/Zenith, one of the largest member companies, agreed to support the show for only one year.

Wayman spent the next several months planning CES, only to see his venue of choice, McCormick Place in Chicago, burn down before his eyes in January 1967. He immediately booked the Americana and Hilton hotels in New York City. Wayman had convinced Jules Steinberg to hold the annual National Appliance and Radio Dealers Association (NARDA) show with CES for four years, thereby guaranteeing an initial attendance base. The initial show in June 1967 had 200 exhibitors, 17,500 attendees (mostly NARDA members), and 100,000 square feet of exhibit space. Today CES is at 1.9 million square feet, 150,000 attendees, and 2,700 exhibitors.

== Sony Betamax case ==
Sony released the Betamax at the 1975 Consumer Electronics Show. Shortly thereafter Universal City Studios sued Sony, and Wayman, as Senior Vice President of the Electronic Industry Association's Consumer Electronics Group, spent the next five years representing the VCR and tape manufacturers against Jack Valenti, then head of the Motion Picture Association of America, and his claims that home taping and video rentals were detrimental to the future of profitability in making movies.
