= Woo Paik =

Korean engineer and inventor

- Hangul: 백우현
- Hanja: 白禹鉉
- RR: Baek Uhyeon
- MR: Paek Uhyŏn

Woo Paik or Paik Woo-hyun (born November 6, 1948) is a Korean engineer and inventor. Paik's contributions to digital television have been recognized through numerous awards and honors, and for this reason, he is sometimes referred to as the "Father of HDTV." He is the author of numerous technical papers and co-inventor of more than 25 inventions earning U.S. Patents in the area of digital video compression, digital transmission, and digital signal processing.

Paik earned his doctorate in electrical and electronics engineering from the Massachusetts Institute of Technology, and his masters and bachelors in engineering degrees from Seoul National University. Most recently, he was president and chief technology officer (CTO) for LG Electronics. Prior to that, he was executive vice president, technology, for the General Instrument Communications Division (later the broadband division of Motorola) until 1996. There, he led the advanced development team that vaulted General Instrument to the forefront of digital television technology. His team developed the DigiCipher HDTV system in 1990, which is the world's first all-digital HDTV system.

Paik was inducted into the Consumer Electronics Hall of Fame and the Academy of Digital Television Pioneers, in 2004. He received the Digital Television Pioneers Award from Broadcasting & Cable Magazine in 2000, the Arthur C. Clark Award from the Satellite Broadcasting and Communications Association in 1999, a technical Emmy Award from the Academy of Television Arts & Sciences for his outstanding digital television achievements in 1996 and the Matti S. Siukola Memorial Award from the IEEE Broadcast Technology Society in 1991.
