= Flip Video =

Video recording device manufactured by Cisco

Flip Video Company

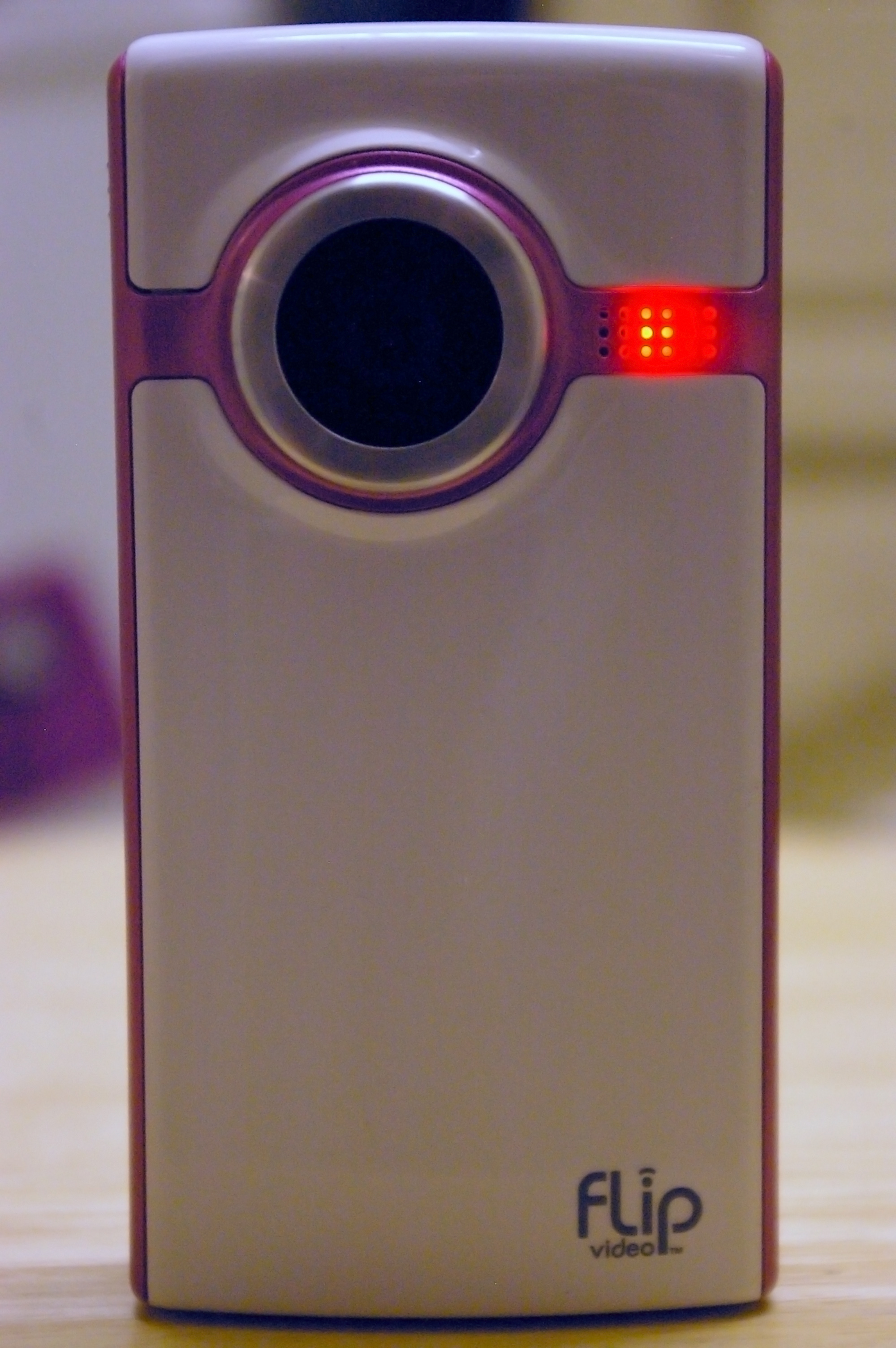
- Industry: Consumer cameras
- Resolutions: VGA, HD
- Brand: Pure Digital Technologies
- First model released: May 1, 2006
- Discontinued: April 12, 2011
- Fate: Acquired and dissolved by Cisco Systems

The Flip Video cameras were an American series of pocket video cameras for digital video created by Pure Digital Technologies, a company bought by Cisco Systems in March 2009; variants include the UltraHD, the MinoHD, and the SlideHD. Flip Video cameras were known for their simple interface with few buttons, minimal menus and built in USB plugs (from which they derived the flip name), and were marketed as making video "simple to shoot, simple to share" Production of the line of Flip video cameras ran from 2006 until April 2011, when Cisco Systems discontinued them as to "exit aspects of [its] consumer businesses". Flip cameras contributed to an increase in the popularity of similar small tapeless camcorders, although the inclusion of HD video cameras in many smartphones has since made them a more niche product.

== Features ==
Flip cameras' video quality was unusually good for their prices and sizes. They can record videos at different resolutions. FlipHD camcorders digitally record high-definition video at 1280 x 720 resolution using H.264 video compression, Advanced Audio Coding (AAC) audio compression and the MP4 file format, while the older models used a 640 x 480 resolution. The MinoHD and SlideHD models have an internal lithium-ion rechargeable battery included, while the Ultra series included a removable battery that can be interchanged with standard AA or AAA batteries.

All models lack memory card extension slots, though the Flip UltraHD(2 hr) can record to a storage device via FlipPort. Models can be connected to a computer with a flip-out USB connector, without the need for a USB cable. Flip Cameras record monaural sound, and use a simple clip-navigation interface with a D-pad and two control buttons which allowed for viewing of recorded videos, starting and stopping recording, and digital zoom. The third and final generation of Flip UltraHD cameras retailed for $149.99 and $199.99 for 4GB (1 hour) and 8GB (2 hour) models respectively, incorporate digital stabilization, and increased the frame rate from 30 to 60 frames per second. With FlipPort, users can plug in external accessories.

All Flip cameras included the required video player and 3ivx codec software, FlipShare, on the camera's internal storage. For all models after 2010, an HDMI cable can stream videos to TV screens.

Later Flip Video models came in a variety of colors, and could be custom ordered with designs digitally painted on. Accessories for the Flip Video camera include an underwater case, a mini-tripod, a bicycle helmet attachment, and a wool case (Mino camcorders) or soft pouch (Flip UltraHD), rechargeable battery replacements for the UltraHD series, and an extension cable.

Flip Video's accompanying software is called FlipShare, which facilitate downloads of videos, basic editing, and uploading to various websites. After the release of version 5.6, FlipShare no longer included a function to convert video to WMV format.

== History ==
The first version was originally released as the "Pure Digital Point & Shoot" video camcorder on May 1, 2006 as a reusable follow-on to the popular CVS One-Time-Use Camcorder, a Pure Digital product sold through CVS/pharmacy stores that was designed for direct conversion to DVD media. The CVS product was a line extension of previous digital disposable camera products, sold initially through Ritz Camera and associated brands under the Dakota Digital name. The camcorder was renamed as the Flip Video a year later. On September 12, 2007, the Flip Ultra was released. The Flip Ultra was the best-selling camcorder on Amazon.com after its debut, capturing about 13% of the camcorder market. Flip products received an unusually large advertising campaign, including product placement, celebrity endorsements, and sponsoring of events such as concert tours during their introduction. From 2009, and through the Cisco takeover, the Flip range was sold in Europe by Widget UK.

=== Models ===
- Pure Digital One-Time-Use Camcorder (20 minutes – model 200)
- Pure Digital Point & Shoot Video Camcorder (30 minutes – 225), Codenamed: Saturn 2.5
- Pure Digital Point & Shoot Video Camcorder (30 minutes – PSV-351; 60 minutes – PSV-352), Codenamed: Saturn 3.5
- Pure Digital Flip Video (30 minutes – F130/PSV-451; 60 minutes – F160/PSV-452), Codenamed: Austin
- Flip Video Ultra (30 minutes – F230/PSV-551; 60 minutes – F260/PSV-552) Codenamed: Chicago
- Flip Video Ultra II (2 hour – U1120), Codenamed: Phoenix SD
- Flip Video UltraHD (2 hours – U2120), Codenamed: Phoenix HD
- Flip Video UltraHD II (1 hour – U260)
- Flip Video UltraHD III (2 hours – U32120)
- Flip Video Mino (1 hour – F360), Codenamed: Fremont
- Flip Video MinoHD (1 hour – F460), Codenamed: Newton
- Flip Video MinoHD II (2 hours – M2120), Codenamed: Quantico
- Cisco Flip MinoPro (4 hours – MP2240)
- Flip Video MinoHD III (1 hour – M3160; 2 hours – M31120)
- Flip Video SlideHD (4 hours – S1240), Codenamed: Jamestown
- Flip Video Ultra Live supposed to be launched April 12, 2011; only a limited amount was produced (2 hours)

=== Mino ===
A smaller version of the Flip, the Flip Video Mino, was released on June 4, 2008. The Mino captured video in 640x480 resolution at 30 frames per second. On launch it retailed for about US$180 in the United States, providing about 60 minutes of video recording capability with 2 GB flash memory capacity.

The third and final Flip MinoHD was released on September 20, 2010. It featured HD recording capabilities in the same dimensions as the second generation MinoHD (1280/720 at 30 fps), The only major change in the MinoHD third generation was Image Stabilization. Also released on September 20, 2010 was a 4 GB MinoHD with one hour of recording capability. The one-hour version retailed for $179 and the two-hour version retailed for $229.

Free Minos were made available to all audience members at YouTube Live due to Flip Video's sponsorship of the event. A station was set up so people could upload the videos to YouTube.

=== FlipShare TV ===

FlipShare TV was an accessory for the third-generation Flip UltraHD camera, allowing users to connect the TV base to their TV, plug in a USB transmitter key to their computer, and view their Flipshare library.

=== Acquisition and shutdown by Cisco ===
On May 21, 2009, Cisco Systems acquired Pure Digital Technologies for US$ 590 million in stock.

On April 12, 2011, Cisco announced that it "will exit aspects of its consumer business", including shutting down the Flip Video division.

Some observers suggested that the Flip was facing growing competition from camera phones, particularly smartphones (which disrupted consumer electronics trade such as point-and-shoot cameras, wristwatches, alarm clocks, portable music players and GPS devices) that had recently begun incorporating HD video cameras.

David Pogue of The New York Times disagreed with the camera phone-competition theory. He said that smartphones made up only a small fraction of overall worldwide sales of cell phones in 2011, and the Flip was still selling strongly when its discontinuation was announced. Other potential causes of the shutdown include the fact that consumer hardware was not part of Cisco's core businesses of services and software, and that their profit margins on consumer electronics were narrow. CNet reported that Flip's Christmas 2010 sales disappointed Cisco.

Cisco shut down the Flip business instead of divesting of it, retaining its technology. It is possible that Cisco always intended the opposite of acquihiring; close the company, keeping Flip's patents and other intellectual property for Cisco's videoconferencing business but not the consumer business or employees.
