= MTX Audio =

American consumer audio company

- Type: Consumer and prosumer manufacturer
- Industry: Audio
- Founded: 1979
- Founder: Loyd Ivey
- Headquarters: Phoenix, AZ
- Key people: John Ivey chairman and CEO
- Products: Audio electronics
- Number of employees: 1200+
- Website: MTX.com

MTX Audio is an American consumer audio company headquartered in Phoenix, Arizona that manufactures sound equipment for applications including car audio, home audio, marine audio and live sound products. They are best known for their car audio products and they specialize in subwoofers and subwoofer amplifiers.

MTX Audio is a brand name owned by the Mitek Corporation.

== History ==
In 1971, founder Loyd Ivey started Ivey Electronics from a passion for music and sound enhancement. Ivey Electronics merged with American Case Company which formed American Acoustic Labs (AAL), later the company acquired Matrecs Electronics. The MTX name came in when Loyd Ivey, then owner of his own company American Acoustic Labs, bought out the Matrecs name in 1979 and changed it to MTX under Ivey’s parent company Mitek. In 1991, MTX Audio acquired Soundcraftsmen, a defunct audio equipment manufacturer which was located in Santa Ana, California, and was called MTX Soundcraftsmen until 1999. In 1984 MTX created the first mobile audio enclosure.

== Today ==
John Ivey is chairman and CEO of MiTek and therefore MTX, which employs over 750 people. MiTek has 12 other companies including MTX, with plants in Ennis, Texas, Louisville, Kentucky, Monroe, Wisconsin, West Dundee, Illinois, Winslow, Illinois, and in Phoenix, Arizona.

List of global brand names and what countries MiTek has their products/facilities in.

- MTX- USA, Europe, Germany, Australia, New Zealand
- COUSTIC- USA, Europe
- Xtant- USA, Europe
- StreetWires- USA, Europe, Australia, New Zealand
- Mitek- USA, Europe
- Atlas IED- USA, Europe

== Parent company ==
John Ivey Is the president and CEO of his company MiTek corp which he founded in the mid-1980s after acquiring Matrecs and the American Case Company. MiTek is the parent company of 13 other companies, including MTX, with manufacturing plants in seven American states and three countries around the world.

== Products ==
MTX makes car audio, marine audio, ATV-UTV Audio, home audio, and portable audio products. The MTX Jackhammer 24 is a 24-inch square subwoofer and one of the largest available on the consumer market.
