= Flip Video Mino =

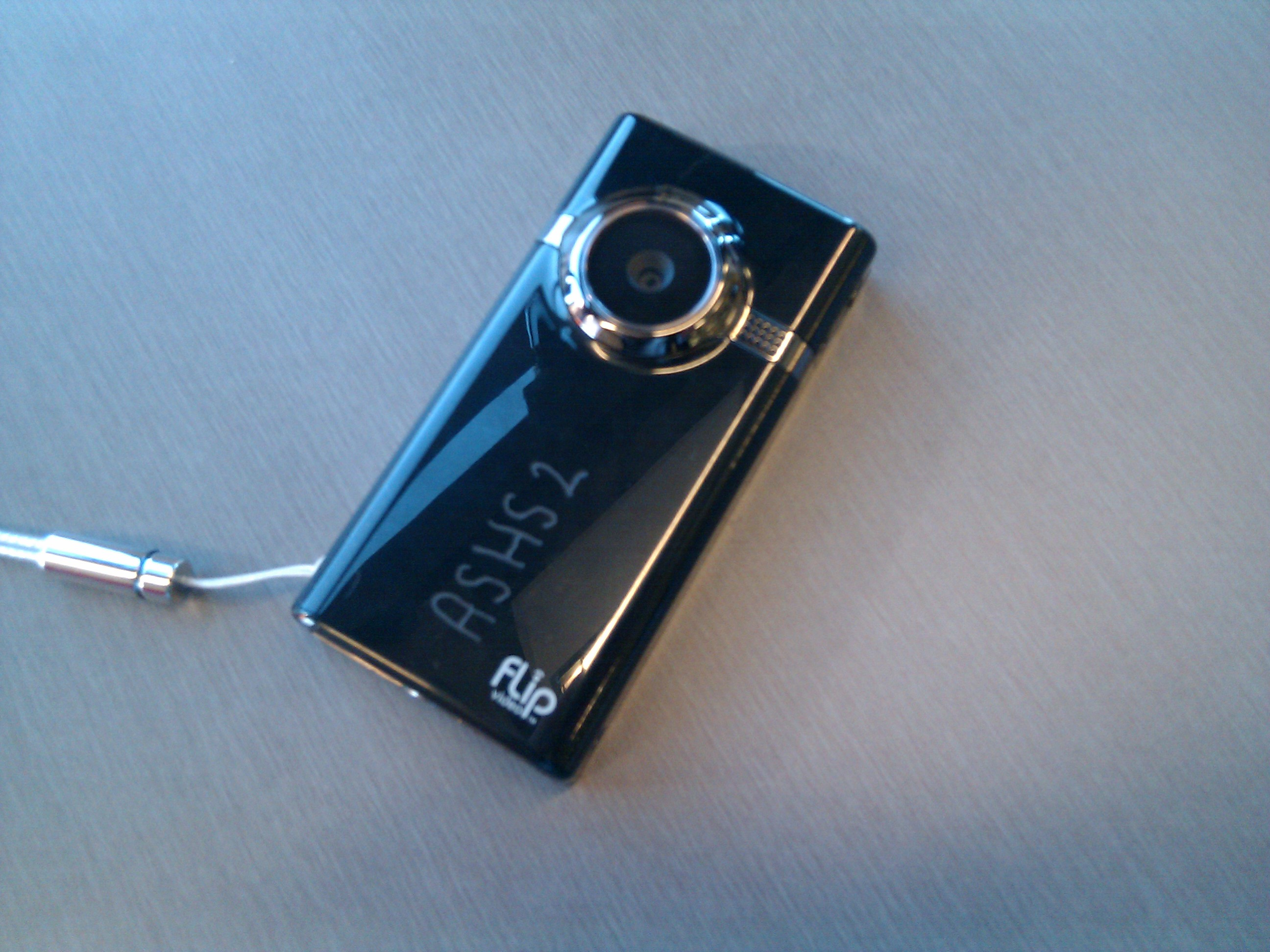
- Brand: Flip Video
- Resolutions: VGA, HD
- Models: Mino, MinoHD, MinoHD II, MinoHD III, Mino Pro, Mino SlideHD
- Released: June 4, 2008
- Discontinued: April 12, 2011
- Status: Unsupported

The Flip Video Mino was a smaller version of the Flip Video camcorder. The original Mino captured video in 640x480 resolution at 30 frames per second with later models featuring HD recording.

The Mino had many features that the Flip Video did not have, including an internal rechargeable battery (instead of 2 AA batteries) and touch-sensitive pause, fast forward, and rewind buttons. The Mino was almost 2 ounces lighter than the Flip and the arm with the USB plug changed positions.

== History ==
The Flip Video Mino was released on June 4, 2008 by Pure Digital.

On November 12, 2008, the Flip MinoHD was released. It had the same dimensions as the regular Mino, but with HD, 30 frames per second recording capabilities. Its internal storage was upgraded to 4 GB while maintaining about one hour of recording time due to the increased optical resolution. The battery life gave about 2 hours of recording time when fully charged.

The original 4 GB MinoHD only had a 3.5mm headphone jack (4-way TRRS : Tip-Ring-Ring-Sleeve or A/V : audio-video) to composite (RCA) output for connecting to a television or input into other media viewing monitors. This was a major drawback to quick viewing of videos on a high definition television, considering that the output video was captured in 720p high definition and composite cables are unable to transmit HD resolution to HD capable televisions. This flaw was corrected in the later released 8 GB version that utilized a mini HDMI output port, which gave the option for Mini HDMI to composite (RCA) or component cables, as well as Mini HDMI to HDMI. This allowed videos to be viewed in full HD on an HD capable television.

In moving to a higher HD resolution, the Flip MinoHD changed from the MPEG-4 Part 2 (.avi) file format to the H.264/MPEG-4 AVC Part 10 (.mp4) format.

== Reception ==
The Flip Mino received great praise from the Wall Street Journal and Newsweek. The Wall Street Journal concluded that: "If you're in the market for a simple camcorder that records high-quality video, the Flip MinoHD is definitely worth $50 more than the regular Flip Mino. But don't say I didn't warn you so when you're bummed out by the screen's still-small size and its inability to share true HD footage via the FlipShare software."

IT Reviews commented that the MinoHD was a "healthy evolution of a popular product, but like its predecessors it can suffer from being a bit too simplistic and omitting some key features that may still be helpful for beginners." The review concluded: "As pocket camcorders go though, it's an impressive device."

The Flip Video MinoHD was the number one in "best budget camcorder" in Cnet's Editors' top camcorder choices. CamcorderInfo.com listed the Flip Mino as its "Best Budget Camcorder" and "Most Innovative Camcorder" in 2008.

== See also ==
- Flip Video
