= Frank Freimann =

American businessperson (1909–1968)

Frank M. Freimann (1909–1968) was an American businessperson who was the head of Magnavox from 1950 until his death in 1968.

== Biography ==
Born in Hungary in 1909, Freimann migrated to Chicago at a young age, where he studied at Crane High School.

In 1930, he founded Electro Acoustics Products Company (EAP). Later, in 1934, the company was acquired by Magnavox and formally merged in 1938.

Freimann died in 1967 in Manhattan.

== Awards and recognition ==
- Fellow of the Institute of Radio Engineers
- Freimann Square in Fort Wayne is named after him.
