= Tandy =

Tandy may refer to:

== Companies ==
- Tandy Corporation, a former leather goods and electronics manufacturer, later known as the parent of the RadioShack and Tandy electronics retail chains
  - InterTAN (1986–2009), former subsidiary for Tandy's European and Canadian outlets
    - Tandy (retail brand), the stores and retail brand used by Tandy Corporation in many countries
    - Tandy Electronics (1973–2011), former Australian subsidiary
  - Tandy computers, various computer models made and/or sold by Tandy Corporation
- Tandy Leather Factory, the former leather division of Tandy Corporation, spun off as a separate business in 1976

== Places ==
- Tandy Community Center, The Ville neighborhood, St. Louis, Missouri, US; NRHP-listed
- Tandy Park, The Ville neighborhood, St. Louis, Missouri, US

== People ==
- Tandy (name), list of notable people with the name

== Fictional uses ==
- Tandy, a recurring character on the U.S. animated TV series Sam & Cat (2013–14)
- "Tandy", the twelfth story (and name its title character) in Sherwood Anderson's short story cycle Winesburg, Ohio (1919)
- Tandy Hampton, a fictional recurring character on the U.S. drama TV series Nashville (2012–2018)
- Phil Tandy Miller, lead fictional character on the U.S. comedy The Last Man on Earth (TV series) (2015–2018)
- Tandy Bowen, alter ego of Dagger from Marvel's superhero duo Cloak and Dagger (1982–present)

== See also ==
- Tandi (disambiguation)
