= Tandy (name) =

Tandy is a surname and given name. Notable people with the name include:

== Surname ==
- Adam Tandy, British television producer
- Charles D. Tandy (1918–1978), chairman of Tandy Corporation
- David W. Tandy (born 1972), American politician
- Donald Tandy (1918–2014), British actor
- Ernest Tandy (1879–1953), British cricketer
- Geoffrey Tandy (1900–1969), British marine biologist and broadcaster
- George Tandy, Jr., American singer-songwriter
- James Tandy (disambiguation), several people
- Jeff Tandy (born 1974), American musician
- Jessica Tandy (1909–1994), American film actress
- Joe Tandy (1983–2009), British racing driver and team owner
- Karen Tandy, American attorney and law enforcement official
- Keith Tandy (born 1989), American football cornerback
- Mark Tandy (disambiguation), several people
- Meagan Tandy (born 1985), American actress and model
- Megan Tandy (born 1988), Canadian biathlete
- Nick Tandy (born 1984), British racecar driver
- Richard Tandy (1948–2024), British musician
- Russell H. Tandy (1891–1963), American illustrator
- Ryan Tandy (1981–2014), Australian rugby league footballer
- Sharon Tandy (1943–2015), South African singer
- Steve Tandy (born 1980), Welsh rugby union player
- Steven Tandy (born 1952), Australian actor
- Vertner Woodson Tandy (1885–1949), architect
- Vic Tandy (1955–2005), British lecturer

== Given name ==
- Tandy Darby (born 1973), American politician
- Tandy Marlin (1970–2023), American professional stock car racing driver
- Tandy Clinton Rice Jr. (1938–2015), American talent agent
- Tandy Trower, American computer scientist
- Tandy Walker (1814–1877), Choctaw chief and Civil War colonial
- Tandy Warnow, American computer scientist

== See also ==
- Tandy (disambiguation)
- Tandi (disambiguation)
