= The Source (retailer) =

Canadian electronics retailer

The Source (Bell) Electronics Inc.
- Trade name: The Source
- Formerly: RadioShack Canada (1986–2004); The Source by Circuit City (2004–2009)
- Type: Subsidiary
- Industry: Retail
- Founded: June 1986; 40 years ago (as InterTAN Canada)
- Defunct: October 24, 2024; 23 months ago
- Fate: Stores converted to Best Buy Express or closed
- Successor: Best Buy Express
- Headquarters: Barrie, Ontario, Canada
- Products: Electronics
- Parent: InterTAN (1986–2004); Circuit City (2004–2009); BCE Inc. (2009–2024)
- Website: thesource.ca

The Source (Bell) Electronics Inc., doing business as The Source (French: La Source), was a Canadian consumer electronics and cell phone retail chain. The chain had been present for more than 50 years in Canada, initially as Radio Shack and later as The Source by Circuit City. The Source was owned by BCE Inc., which purchased the assets of InterTAN from its parent, American retailer Circuit City, in 2009. The chain was based in Barrie, Ontario.

The chain had its origins in the Canadian franchises of RadioShack; in 2004, parent company InterTAN was acquired by American retailer Circuit City, who rebranded the stores as The Source by Circuit City the following year. In 2009, amid the liquidation of Circuit City's U.S. operations, Bell acquired The Source for US$135 million.

In January 2024, BCE announced that it would permanently close approximately one-third of The Source's locations and its Barrie head office, and transition the remainder to a franchising partnership with its erstwhile competitor Best Buy. 167 locations were temporarily closed, renovated and rebranded under the new Best Buy Express banner throughout the second half of 2024. BCE continues to own the locations, but they now carry exclusively Best Buy merchandise, and offer services such as Geek Squad. They also continue to exclusively offer telecommunications services from BCE's subsidiaries including Bell Canada.

== History ==
The Source began as the Canadian branch of Radio Shack (later "RadioShack"). The first Radio Shack store in Canada was opened on April 20, 1970, in Rexdale, Ontario. The chain was originally owned by Radio Shack's American parent company Tandy Corporation, but was spun off in June 1986, along with the rest of Tandy's international operations, as InterTAN. A licensing agreement with what became RadioShack Corporation allowed InterTAN to continue to use the chain's name and logo. InterTAN abandoned its non-profitable West German stores in 1987, left Belgium and France in 1993, sold its British stores to Carphone Warehouse in 1999 and sold its Australian stores to Woolworth subsidiary Dick Smith Electronics in 2002, leaving just the Canadian Radio Shack, Battery Plus, and Rogers Plus stores.

First logo

Logo as a subsidiary of Circuit City (2005-2009)

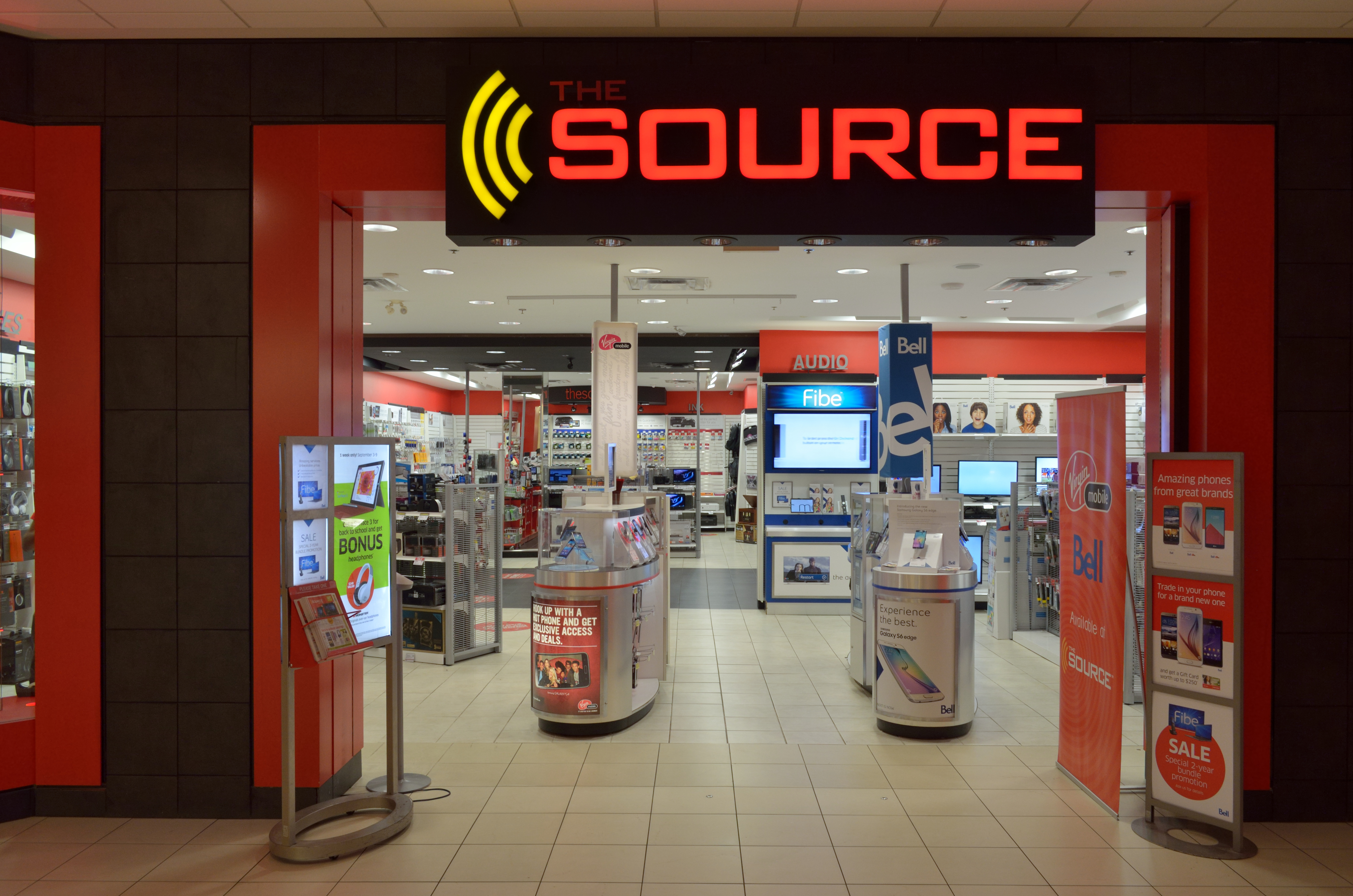
Store in Promenade in 2015

In May 2004, InterTAN was acquired by Circuit City. One week after the acquisition was completed, RadioShack Corporation filed a lawsuit in the 352nd Judicial District Court in Tarrant County, Texas, to end the licensing agreement. RadioShack Corporation claimed that InterTAN had breached the terms of their agreement. On March 24, 2005, the district court judge ruled in favour of RadioShack and cancelled the agreement. The ruling prohibited InterTAN from using the brand name on its stores or in any of its products, packaging, and advertising after June 30, 2005.

On April 26, 2005, Circuit City announced that the stores would be renamed The Source by Circuit City (La Source par Circuit City in Quebec). The rebranding process was completed in the majority of the chain's Canadian stores by July 1, 2005. The chain also introduced new house brands, including Nexxtech and Vital, in place of RadioShack store brands.

In February 2007, The Source announced it would close down 62 low volume stores across Canada. On March 30, 2007, Circuit City announced to its shareholders that it was seeking options including selling off the InterTAN/The Source subsidiary to cut losses. On November 10, 2008, InterTAN sought protection from its creditors, after Circuit City filed for Chapter 11 bankruptcy.

Circuit City announced on January 16, 2009, that its namesake U.S. stores would be liquidated. The Source was not affected by the announcement, and a process followed to sell the Canadian operations as a going concern.

On March 2, 2009, Canadian telecommunications firm Bell Canada announced it would acquire The Source and continue to operate it as an independent division. The acquisition was completed July 1 for the final purchase price of $135 million US, following which the chain removed the "by Circuit City" from its name. Prior to January 2010, the stores sold mobile phone services from Bell's main competitor, Rogers Wireless; at that point, the chain began to exclusively market Bell-owned wireless (including Bell Mobility and Virgin Mobile), television, and internet services. The Source continued to sell a full array of consumer electronics products.

=== Best Buy Express ===
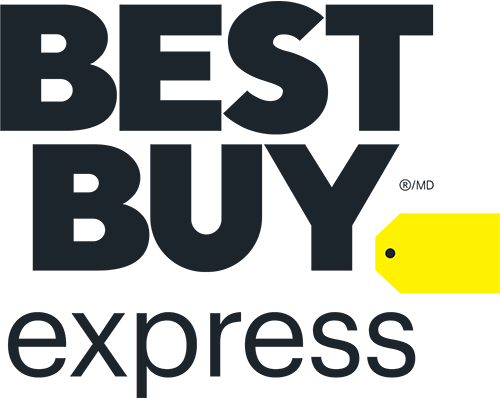
Logo of Best Buy Express

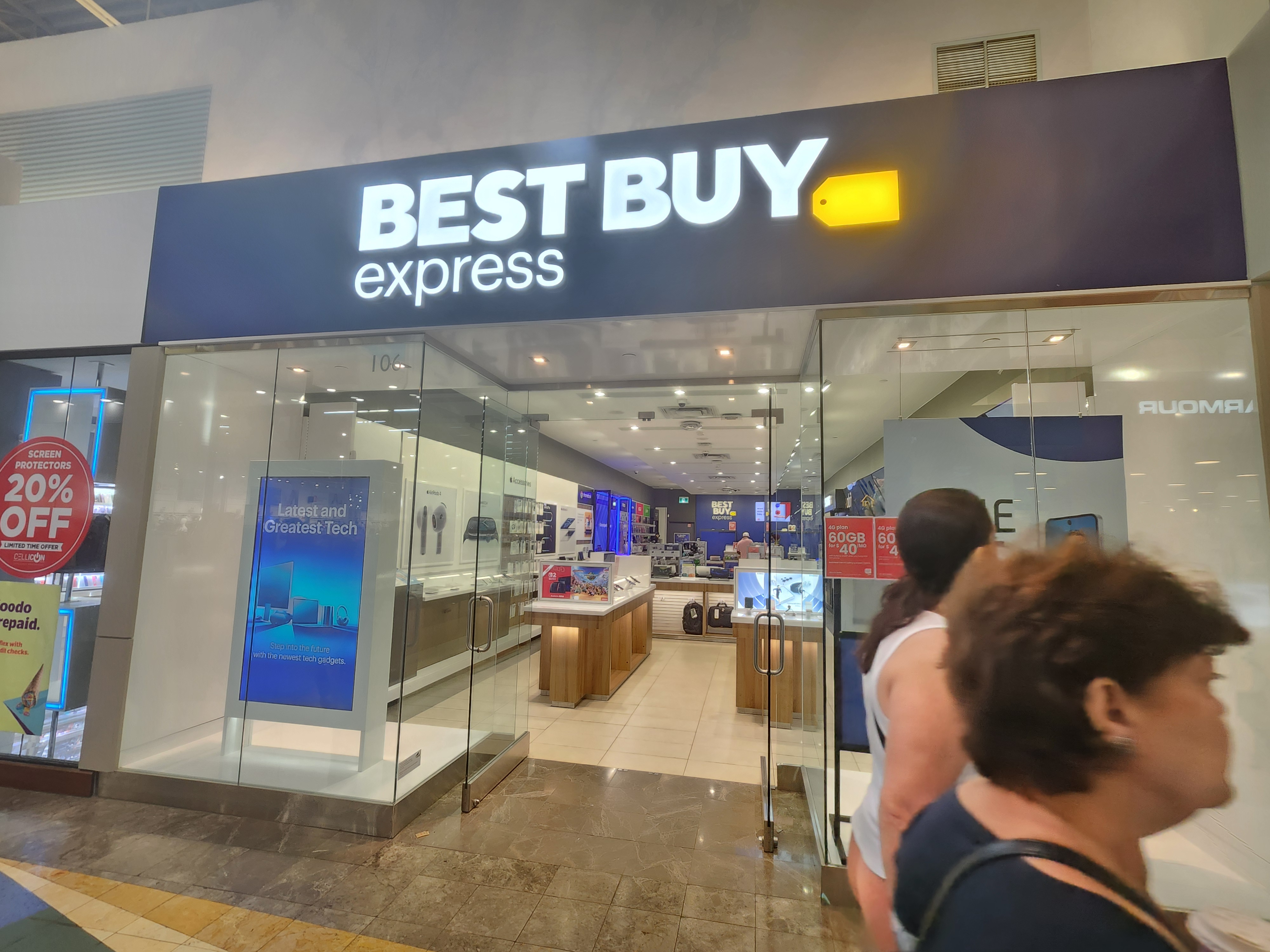
Best Buy Express Store in Vaughan Mills in 2025

On January 18, 2024, Bell announced that it would enter into a franchise agreement with Best Buy Canada to relaunch some of The Source's locations as Best Buy Express. The stores would be integrated with Best Buy's retail operations, offering in-store pickup for online orders from the Best Buy website, and technical support services under the Geek Squad banner. The stores remain owned and operated by BCE, and continue to exclusively sell Bell-owned telecom services (unlike the Best Buy Mobile kiosks at big-box Best Buy locations, which offer services from multiple providers). Best Buy stated that the agreement would roughly double its total number of retail stores in Canada, and extend its retail presence into new markets such as malls and smaller markets.

The first converted Best Buy Express location opened at the Guildford Town Centre in Surrey, British Columbia, on June 26, 2024; gradually through October 2024, 167 of The Source's nearly 300 locations were converted to Best Buy Express, and all other locations have closed permanently. The Source also closed its Barrie offices.
