= Keith Barr =

Keith Barr may refer to:

- Keith Barr (businessman) (born 1970), American businessman
- Keith Barr (Gaelic footballer) (born 1968), Gaelic footballer for Dublin
- Keith Barr (musician), British jazz musician who worked with Ken Moule
- Keith Barr (c. 1950–2010), American inventor and founder of Alesis
