= James Tandy =

James Tandy may refer to:

- James Tandy (cricketer) (born 1981), English cricketer
- James Tandy (public servant) (1918–1997), Australian public servant
- James Napper Tandy (1739–1803), member of the Society of United Irishmen
