= TOTC =

TOTC may refer to:

- A Tale of Two Cities (disambiguation)
- Tales of the City, a series of novels by Armistead Maupin
  - Tales of the City (novel), the first novel in the series
  - Tales of the City (miniseries), a 1993 television miniseries based on the book series
- Team of the century
- Think of the children
- Trial of the century
- The Trial of the Century, a 2004 album by American rock band French Kicks
- Turn of the century (disambiguation)
- Tyndale Old Testament Commentaries, a series of Biblical commentaries published by IVP
- The Olivia Tremor Control, psychedelic band
