= Alan Wurtzel =

Alan Wurtzel is an American businessman, author, speaker, and philanthropist. He spent 13 years as CEO of Circuit City before retiring in 1986. He now acts as trustee for the Phillips Collection and the Chesapeake Bay Foundation.

== Career ==
Wurtzel received a B.A. from Oberlin College in 1955 and a J.D. from Yale Law School. He joined Circuit City in 1966 as vice president of legal affairs and then was CEO from 1972 to 1986. He was chairman of the board from 1984 to 1994 and vice-chairman from 1994 to 2001. Circuit City was profiled as one of the eleven companies in Jim Collins' 2001 book Good to Great. Wurtzel sold all of his Circuit City Stock in 2000, and left the company in 2001. Under his leadership, the company grew to be the best performing Fortune 500 Company for any fifteen-year period between 1965 and 1995.

Wurtzel was director of Dollar Tree Stores, Inc., retiring from the board in 2009, and from 1989 to 1996, was on the board of Office Depot. He has been an active investor in startup companies and remains on the board of two privately held companies.

On October 9, 2012, Wurtzel released his book on the history of Circuit City, Good to Great to Gone, with Diversion Books.

== Personal life ==
Since retiring from Circuit City, Wurtzel has split his time between commercial and non-profit activities. Early on, much of his time was devoted to higher education and K-12 educational reform. He was a trustee of Virginia Commonwealth University where he endowed a professorship in memory of his father, a member of the Virginia State Board of Education and the State Council for Higher Education. He was also a director of not-for-profit standards-based education policy organizations including New American Schools, National Center on Education and the Economy, and the Council for Basic Education. As a member of Virginia's State Board of Education, he actively participated in the formulation and adoption of the current Standards of Learning program.

Currently, Wurtzel is a trustee of The Phillips Collection, where he has been active in developing its expansion and investment plans; the Chesapeake Bay Foundation, an environmental group that works to protect the Bay; the Brady Campaign, a gun violence prevention organization, and his alma mater Oberlin College.

He is married to the playwright Irene Rosenberg Wurtzel, and has three grown children. He lives in Washington, D.C. and Delaplane, Virginia.
