= Leavell =

Leavell is a surname. Notable people with the surname include:

- Allen Leavell (born 1957), American basketball player
- Byrd Leavell, American literary agent
- Carroll Leavell (born 1936), American politician
- Chuck Leavell (born 1952), American musician
- Fin Leavell, American singer-songwriter
- Linda Leavell (born 1954), American writer
