= Tandi (given name) =

Tandi is a feminine given name. Notable people with the name include:

- Tandi Andrews, Miss Continental 1986
- Tandi Iman Dupree (1978–2005), American drag queen and pageant girl
- Tandi Indergaard (born 1978), English diver
- Tandi Mwape (born 1996), Zambian footballer
- Tandi Wright (born 1970), New Zealand actress

== See also ==
- Tandi (disambiguation)
- Thandie
