= Zip.ca =

Canadian video rental company

Coordinates: 45°19′58″N 75°42′17″W

- Type: Private
- Industry: Electronic commerce
- Founded: 2004
- Defunct: 2014
- Headquarters: Ottawa, Ontario, Canada
- Key people: Robert Hall, Founder and Chairman; Christina Beavis, CEO
- Products: Online DVD rental Movie rental kiosks
- Revenue: Not disclosed
- Number of employees: ~50

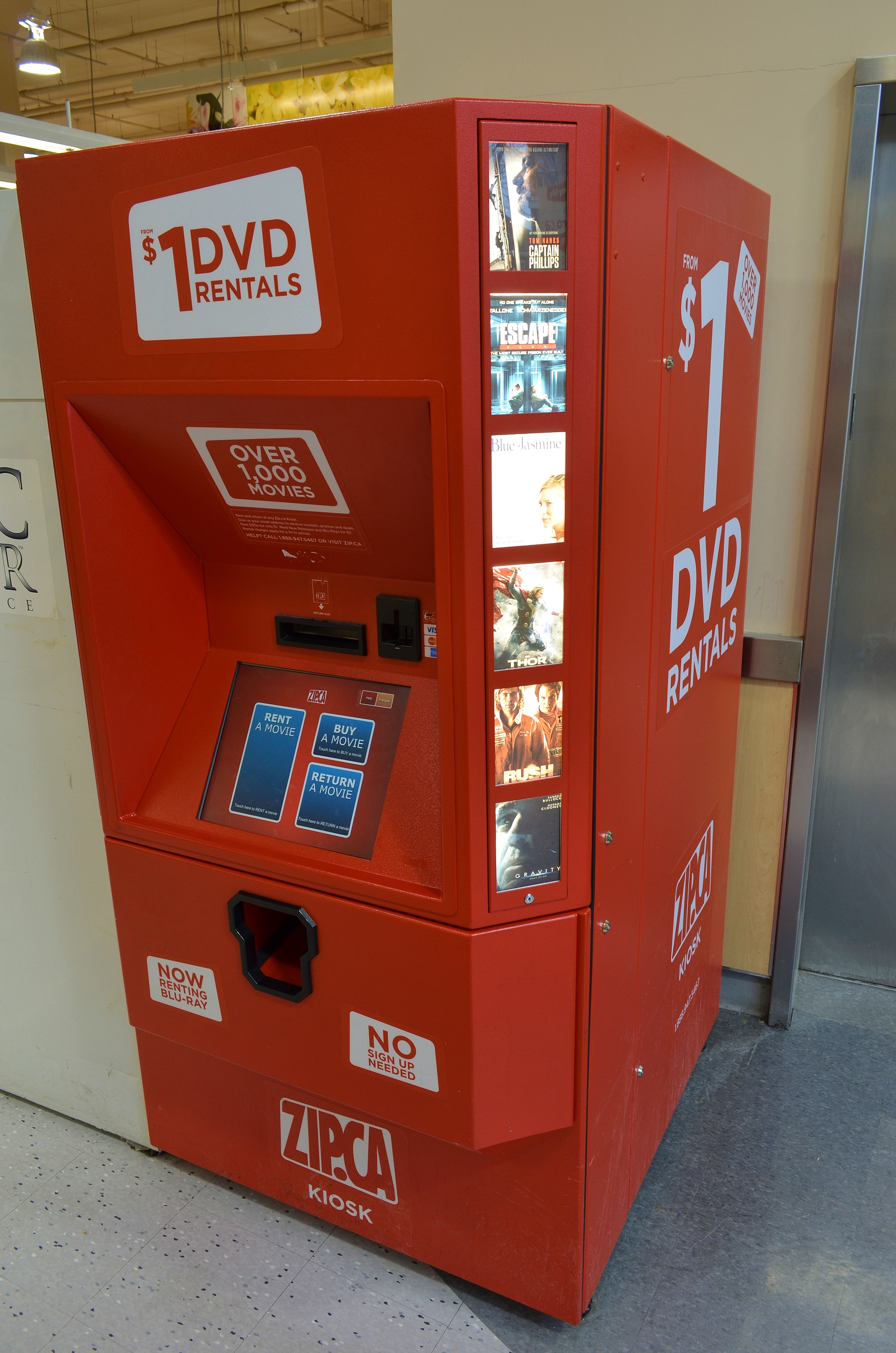
Zip.ca DVD Rental Kiosk

Zip.ca was an online DVD rental and movie rental kiosk company operating in Canada. It had a database of over 82,000 unique titles.

Zip.ca was a member of the privately held Momentous Group of companies and was the owner of the Ottawa Rapidz baseball team until its first-season bankruptcy.

On August 17, 2014, Zip.ca announced on its website that it was closing its doors and was no longer shipping discs to its members.

== Corporate history ==
=== 2000s: inception ===
Zip.ca began its rental operations in February 2004, from its base of operations in Ottawa, Ontario. In July 2005, it arranged to provide the fulfillment services for Rogers Video Direct, a new online subsidiary of one of Canada's largest video store chains. By February 2006, Zip.ca had over 30,000 subscribers. In December 2006, Zip.ca announced passing the 6,000,000 disc rental milestone.

=== 2010s: kiosk debut ===
Zip.ca's movie rental kiosks were introduced in 2010.

=== Abandoned digital service ===
In July 2009, Zip.ca announced it had partnered with Sonic Solutions as it prepared to offer a streaming video on demand (VOD) service similar to that introduced in the U.S. in 2007 by its largest American counterpart, Netflix. In May 2011, after Netflix's 2010 Canadian launch as a streaming-only service, Zip.ca announced a further partnership with Samsung, and said its service would launch as a transactional VOD platform, not as a subscription service. The service remained unlaunched at the time of the company's closure in 2014.

== Rental plans ==
Monthly disc shipments	Discs included	Blu-ray
Up to 2	1	No
Unlimited	1	No
Unlimited	2	Yes
Unlimited	3	Yes
Up to 11	4	Yes
Up to 16	6	Yes
Up to 22	8	Yes

Zip.ca imposed a free shipping limit per month, unless the customer chose the special "Unlimited" plan. When the DVD shipment limit was reached, the customer had to pay for additional shipments ($2.49 per DVD) in the billing month or wait until the next billing month before Zip.ca would continue shipments. In November 2011, Zip.ca began charging a $1 rental fee for each Blu-ray disc. The Blu-ray fee was removed in October 2012. Blu-ray was not available on either of the 1-DVD plans.

== Canadian rental marketplace ==
On August 30, 2005, Zip.ca announced that it was buying out the online operations of its then main Canadian rival, VHQonline.ca, and has also picked up assets from other companies going out of business.
