= CarMax =

US-based used car retailer

CarMax, Inc.
- Type: Public
- Traded as: NYSE: KMX; S&P 600 component
- Industry: Used car retailer
- Founded: September 1993; 33 years ago (as a subsidiary of Circuit City)
- Headquarters: Richmond, Virginia, U.S.
- Key people: Keith Barr (president & CEO)
- Net income: ▼US$247.3 million (FY2026)
- Number of employees: c. 27,000+ (2026)
- Parent: Circuit City Corporation (1993–2002)
- Website: carmax.com

CarMax, Inc. (branded as CarMax) is a used vehicle retailer based in the United States. It operates two business segments: CarMax Sales Operations and CarMax Auto Finance. The company began as a side business of Circuit City Corporation, opening its first location in September 1993 in Richmond, Virginia. As of November 2026, CarMax operates 263 locations.

== About ==
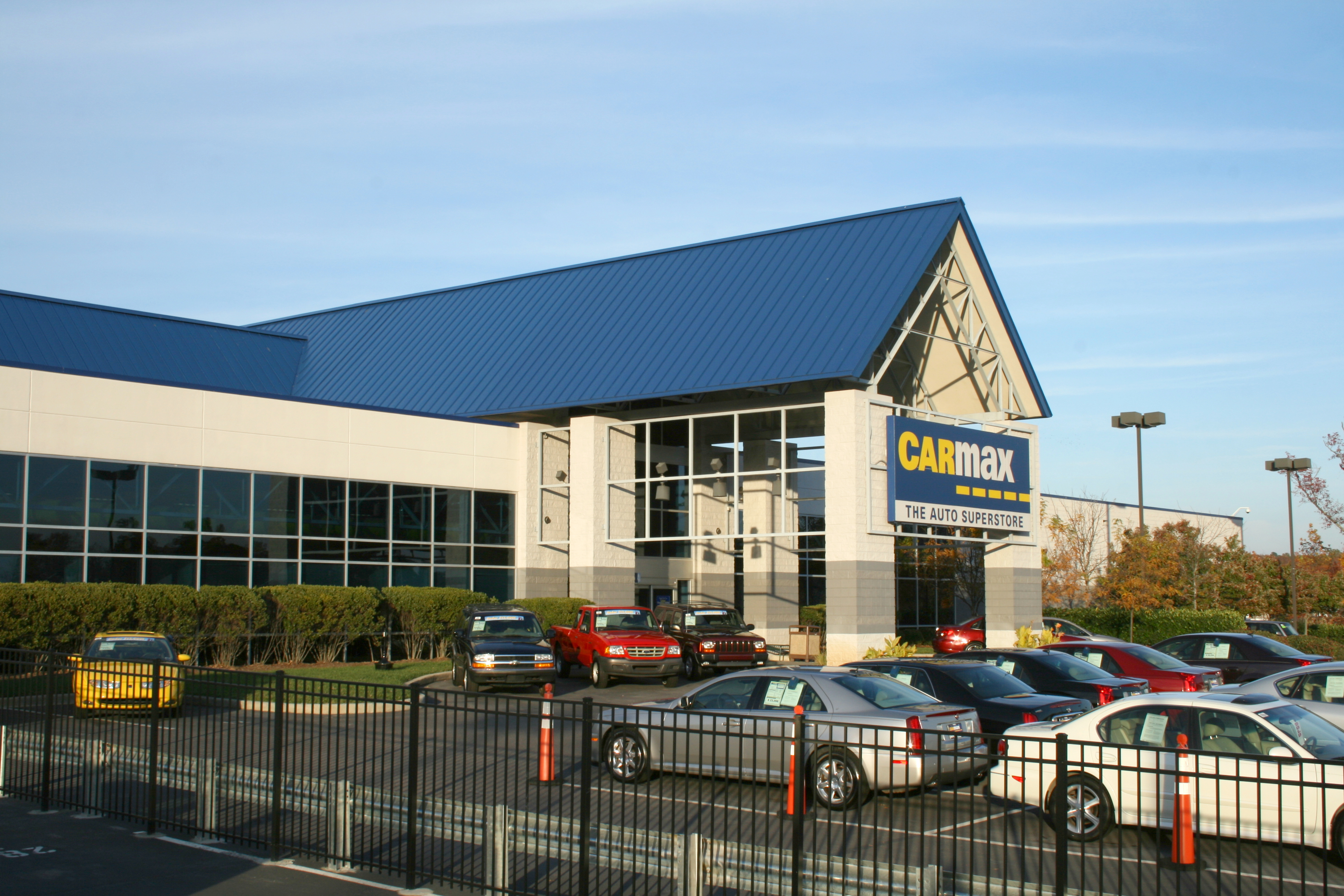
CarMax store in Raleigh, North Carolina

CarMax's headquarters is located in Richmond, Virginia. CarMax Auto Finance operates from Kennesaw, Georgia. There are CarMax retail locations in 41 states as well as customer service call centers.

While CarMax stores focus on marketing used vehicles, the company acquired its first new car franchise with Chrysler Corporation in 1996. By 1999, it added new vehicle franchises for Mitsubishi Motors, Toyota, and Nissan. In late 2021, CarMax sold its last new vehicle dealership, located in Kenosha, Wisconsin, to the Rydell Company.

In 2020, CarMax acquired a minority stake in automobile information services company Edmunds.com. The following year, CarMax purchased remaining stake of the company making it a wholly owned subsidiary.

Effective December 1, 2025, CarMax appointed David McCreight as interim president and CEO. In addition, Tom Folliard, an executive with a 30 years of experience with the company, including as CEO from 2006 to 2016, was appointed interim executive chair of the board. Keith Barr took position of CEO and President of CarMax in March 2026.

== Concept ==
Circuit City executives developed the concept for CarMax under then-CEO Richard L. Sharp. It was developed for nearly a year in 1991, using the code name "Project X." It was also known as "Honest Rick's Used Cars" to those intimately involved in the skunk works team. Before the first store was built, DeVito/Verdi was hired as the advertising agency and creative resource. The company executed the campaign and additional TV advertisements throughout several years in support of the launch and the initial wave of stores.

Interior of a CarMax store in Gastonia, North Carolina

A typical CarMax store is approximately 59,000 square feet (5,500 m^{2}), carries an inventory of 300–400 vehicles, and turns its inventory over eight to ten times a year. On average, a CarMax location employs 40 sales associates. Each car goes through a 125-point inspection process, and includes a 30-day warranty, three days to change the financing for free, and, 10-day money-back guarantee (reduced in 2024 from a 30-day money-back guarantee).

Circuit City issued the first CarMax stock in February 1997, when CarMax had seven locations. Initially, the stock was a tracking stock still under the umbrella of Circuit City. CarMax officially split from Circuit City as of October 1, 2002, when it was spun off as a stock dividend for Circuit City shareholders, with shares also issued to those holding CarMax tracking stock.

CarMax sold over 750,000 vehicles to consumers in Fiscal Year 2021 (March 1, 2020–February 28, 2021). According to the CarMax fiscal year 2018 report released on April 24, 2018, the company opened 15 used car superstores in Fiscal Year 2018, and planned to open 15 additional stores in Fiscal Year 2019.

== Competition ==
While CarMax is seen as the nation's largest used-car retailer, it has competition. With a significant shift in customer shopping habits, more online-only companies have worked to capture CarMax's share in the used vehicle market. CarMax unveiled an Omni-channel platform to allow customers to buy a car online, in-store, or any combination of these. They have provided opportunities for customers to choose vehicle delivery at their homes, contactless curbside pickup, and more.

== Recognition ==
CarMax is included in Fortune's "100 Best Companies to Work For" list from 2005 to 2025, placing 69th in 2025.

Other awards include:

- Best Workplaces for Diversity 2019
- Training Magazine's - Training Top 125
