= Richard Sharp (executive) =

American businessman

Richard L. "Rick" Sharp (April 12, 1947 – June 24, 2014) was an American business and retail executive who was the CEO of Circuit City, a former consumer electronics retail chain, from 1986 to 2000. In 1993, Sharp co-founded CarMax, the largest used car retailer in the United States, which grew to more than 135 locations with revenue of $12.5 billion by 2013. He was also a founding investor and member of the board of directors of Crocs, a footwear company.

== Early life and education ==
Sharp was born in Washington D.C., on April 12, 1947, and raised in nearby Alexandria, Virginia. He graduated from the former George Washington High School in Alexandria in 1965. Sharp attended the University of Virginia, where he studied electrical engineering during the middle of the 1960s. However, he dropped out to pursue computer science, a program which was not offered by the University of Virginia at the time. He later explained to the Richmond Times-Dispatch that he lost interest in the original major, "One semester, I went to class and I got B grades. The second semester, I had no interest." Sharp initially spent much of his time playing pool and poker. He never completed a college degree, but did enroll in computer courses at the College of William and Mary in Williamsburg, Virginia, from 1968 to 1970 and studied advanced management at Harvard University in 1985.

== Career ==
Sharp founded a computer hardware and software business development company when he was just 27 years old.

He was first hired by Circuit City as an executive vice president in 1982. He was Circuit City's chief executive from 1986 to 2000. Under Sharp, Circuit City's annual revenue grew from $175 million to 10.6 billion during his fourteen-year tenure. The number of brick-and-mortar stores also increased from 69 in 1988 to more than 600 locations by 2000. Sharp also moved Circuit City from its core consumer electronics business into new ventures, such as home security. Critics have argued that the move into these new ventures caused Circuit City to lose focus amid growing competition. Sharp retired as Circuit City's CEO in 2000 and left the company's board in 2002.

All Circuit City stores closed in 2009 due to competition from other retailers, such as Best Buy, and e-commerce. In a 2013 interview with the Richmond Times-Dispatch, Sharp criticized the choices made by the company's executives after he left the company, "It is a sad thing...They made some stupid decisions after I left."

Rick Sharp, the then chief executive of Circuit City, delivered a speech to a conference held by J. D. Power and Associates in the early 1990s. Following his speech, Sharp conceived of a potential Circuit City expansion into the automotive retail business. Sharp led a team of Circuit City executives who created a used car retailer focused on two main ideas: no haggling and a huge inventory. The team rejected several proposed names, including "Honest Rick’s Used Cars" and "Sharp Motors" before choosing CarMax. Co-founded by Sharp in 1993, CarMax grew to $12.5 billion in annual sales at approximately 135 locations by 2013. Sharp hired Thomas J. Folliard as one of CarMax's first employees. Folliard was the president and chief executive of CarMax from 2006 until 2016, when Folliard retired.

Sharp was a founding investor and member of the board of Crocs, which was founded in 2002. He also established an investment firm, V-Ten Capital Partners.

In 2008, Sharp was inducted into the Consumer Electronics Hall of Fame.

== Personal life ==
Diagnosed with early-onset posterior cortical atrophy, a rare form of Alzheimer's disease, in October 2010, Sharp was an advocate for research on the disease. His grandfather, father and uncle had also suffered from early-onset Alzheimer's. Sharp and his wife, Sherry, donated more than $5 million for Alzheimer's research since 1999, most of which went to Johns Hopkins School of Medicine, where he was a member of its advisory board.

Sharp died from posterior cortical atrophy at his home in Goochland, Virginia, on June 24, 2014, at the age of 67. He was survived by his wife of forty-five years, Sherry Sharp, their two daughters, and four grandchildren.
