= A Tale of Two Cities (disambiguation) =

A Tale of Two Cities is an 1859 novel by Charles Dickens.

A Tale of Two Cities may also refer to:

== Adaptations of the novel ==
- A Tale of Two Cities (1911 film), a silent film
- A Tale of Two Cities (1917 film), a silent American film directed by Frank Lloyd
- A Tale of Two Cities (1922 film), a silent film
- A Tale of Two Cities (1935 film), starring Ronald Colman
- A Tale of Two Cities (1935 play), by Terence Rattigan and John Gielgud
- A Tale of Two Cities (opera), 1950, by Arthur Benjamin
- A Tale of Two Cities (1958 film), featuring Dirk Bogarde
- A Tale of Two Cities (1965 TV series), featuring Patrick Troughton
- A Tale of Two Cities (1980 film), featuring Kenneth More
- A Tale of Two Cities (1980 TV series), featuring Paul Shelley
- A Tale of Two Cities (1989 TV series), featuring James Wilby
- A Tale of Two Cities (musical), a 2008 Broadway musical
- A Tale of Two Cities (2026 TV series), featuring Kit Harington

== Drama ==
- "A Tale of Two Cities" (Lost), a 2006 episode of the TV series Lost
- "A Tale of Two Cities" (Mad Men), an episode of the TV series Mad Men
- A Tale of 2 Cities, a Singaporean Chinese drama by MediaCorp Channel 8
- Underbelly: A Tale of Two Cities, the second season of the Australian crime drama Underbelly

== Other ==
- "A Tale of Two Cities", the 1886 poem about Calcutta by Rudyard Kipling
- A Tale of Two Cities (1946 film), about the atomic bombings of Hiroshima and Nagasaki
- A Tale of Two Cities (album), the debut album by Mr Hudson & The Library
- A Tale of Two Cities (speech), delivered by Mario Cuomo at the 1984 Democratic National Convention
- A Tale of Two Cities: The Circuit City Story, a 2010 American film
- "A Tale of 2 Citiez", a 2014 song by rapper J. Cole

== See also ==
- Tales of Two Cities, a 2006 novel by George Fetherling
- Meenaxi: A Tale of Three Cities, a 2004 Indian film by M. F. Husain
- A Tale of Three Cities, a 2015 Chinese historical film
- A Tale of Two Kitties, a 1942 animated short film by Bob Clampett
- A Tale of Two Nations, an 1894 novel by William Hope "Coin" Harvey
