= Circuit City =

Consumer electronics retailer

Circuit City Stores, Inc.
- Third and final Circuit City logo, used from 2001 until its liquidation in 2009 (Note: It was also used for the revival throughout its entire run until it shut down in 2012. A slightly modified version of this logo is used for the second revival.)
- Formerly: Wards Company (1949–1984); Circuit City Stores, Inc. (1984–2009); CircuitCity.com, Inc. (2009–2012)
- Type: Private
- Traded as: NYSE: CC
- Industry: Consumer electronics retail
- Founded: 1949; 77 years ago (as Wards Company); 1984; 42 years ago (as Circuit City Stores); 2009; 17 years ago (as CircuitCity.com)
- Founder: Samuel S. Wurtzel (original)
- Defunct: March 8, 2009; 17 years ago (original company)
- Fate: Chapter 11 bankruptcy in September 2008 followed by Chapter 7 Conversion, full liquidation on March 8, 2009; brand acquired and revived in 2016
- Headquarters: Richmond, Virginia, United States (1949–2009)
- Products: Consumer electronics
- Number of employees: (2000)
- Website: circuitcity.com

Circuit City Corporation, Inc., formerly Circuit City Stores, Inc., was an American consumer electronics retail company, which was founded in 1949 by Samuel Wurtzel as the Wards Company, operated stores across the United States, and pioneered the electronics superstore format in the 1970s. After multiple purchases and a successful run on the NYSE, it changed its name to Circuit City Stores Inc.

Ronny Shmoel re-established the brand name in 2016 as part of his acquisition of the brand name and trademark rights sold by Systemax. Systemax formerly operated the CircuitCity.com website from 2009 until 2012, when it was consolidated into the TigerDirect brand, which kept the website open until 2023, when TigerDirect shut down.

== Retail history ==
=== As Wards Company (1949–1984) ===
In early 1949, Wurtzel was on vacation in Richmond, Virginia, when, while at a local barber shop, he was witness to the start of television in the South. Imagining the opportunities, in late 1949, he moved his family to Richmond and opened the first Wards Company retail store. Later, Abraham L. Hecht joined him as a partner in the business.

By 1959, Wards Company operated four television and home appliance stores in Richmond. The company continued to grow and acquired stores in other locations including Albany, New York; Mobile, Alabama; Washington, D.C.; and Costa Mesa, California. During the 1970s and early 1980s, it also sold mail-order under "Dixie Hi Fi" and advertised in hi-fi magazines. Wards experimented with several retail formats in Richmond, including smaller mall outlets branded "Sight-n-Sound" and "Circuit City".

Samuel Wurtzel served as president of the company until 1970 and remained the chairman until 1984. Alan Wurtzel, his son, became CEO of Wards in 1972 and initially focused on digesting the acquisitions and shedding unprofitable operations. After developing a long range plan for the company in 1973, construction began on a distribution center and new corporate offices building at 2040 Thalbro Street (named after Thalhimer Bros. Department Store) in Richmond, Virginia and in the extra space, "Wards Loading Dock", its first warehouse showroom opened on May 1, 1975. The large-format store was popular with customers. The company continued to expand with the new format modeled after "Wards Loading Dock" and renamed it Circuit City Superstore in 1978; the first locations called such opened on June 22 of that year in North Carolina.

=== As Circuit City Stores (1984–2009) ===
Original Circuit City logo, used from 1978 to 1989

The second Circuit City logo, used from 1989 to 2000

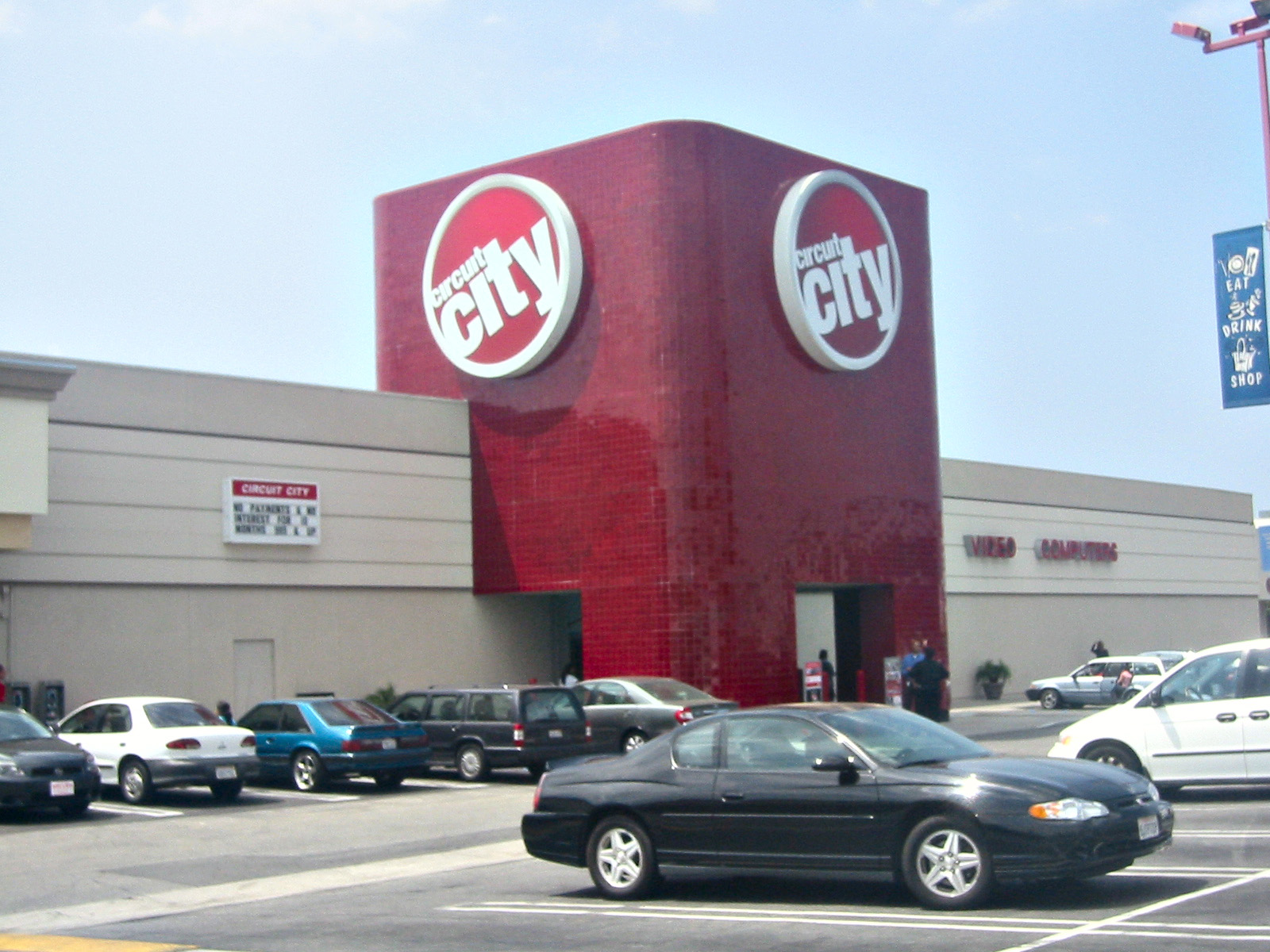
Red Tower entrance Circuit City Superstore format on La Cienega Blvd. in West Los Angeles, California, opened in 1985, using the "Horizon"-era logo.

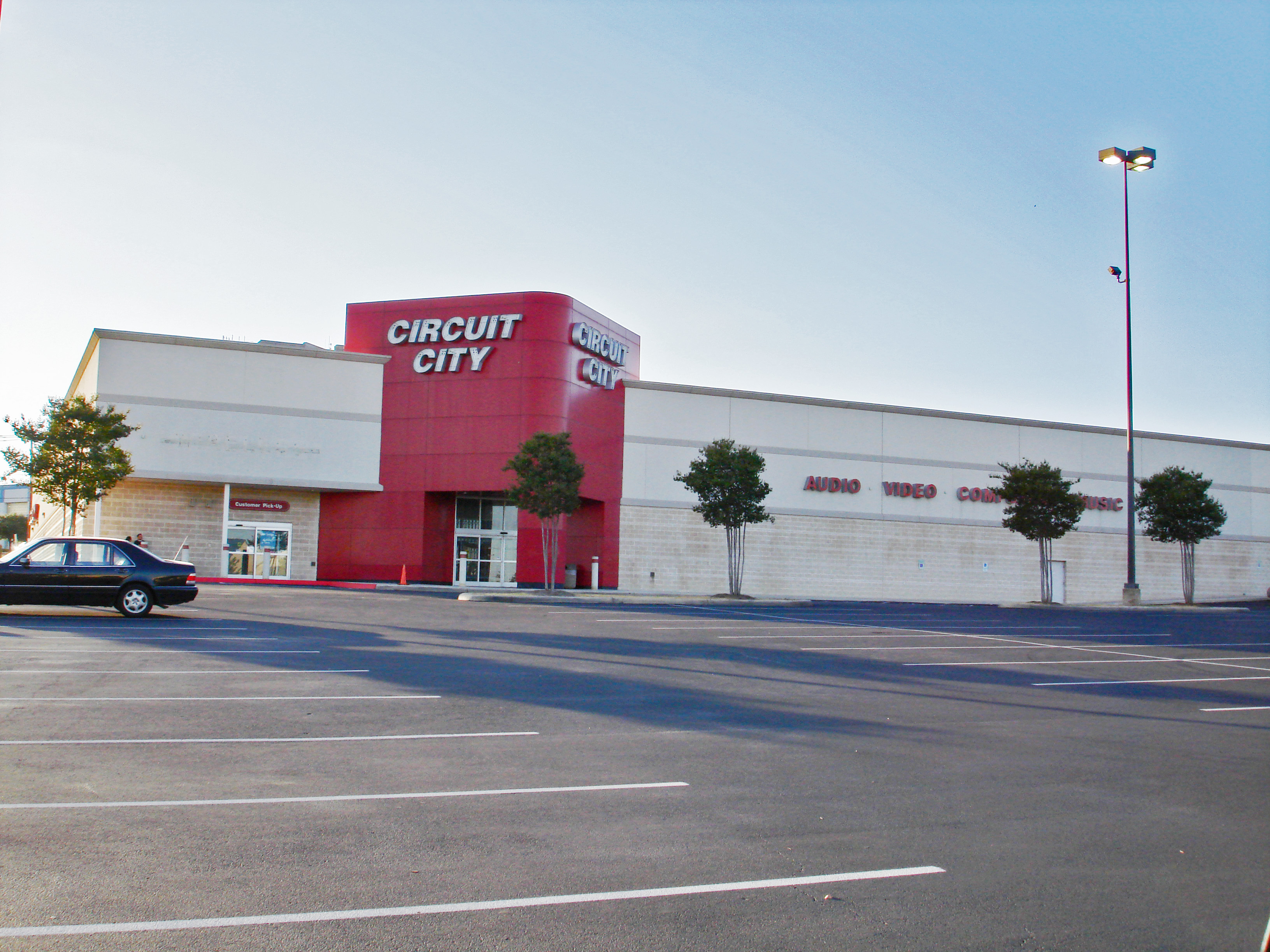
"Plug" Circuit City Superstore format in San Antonio, Texas, opened in 1993.

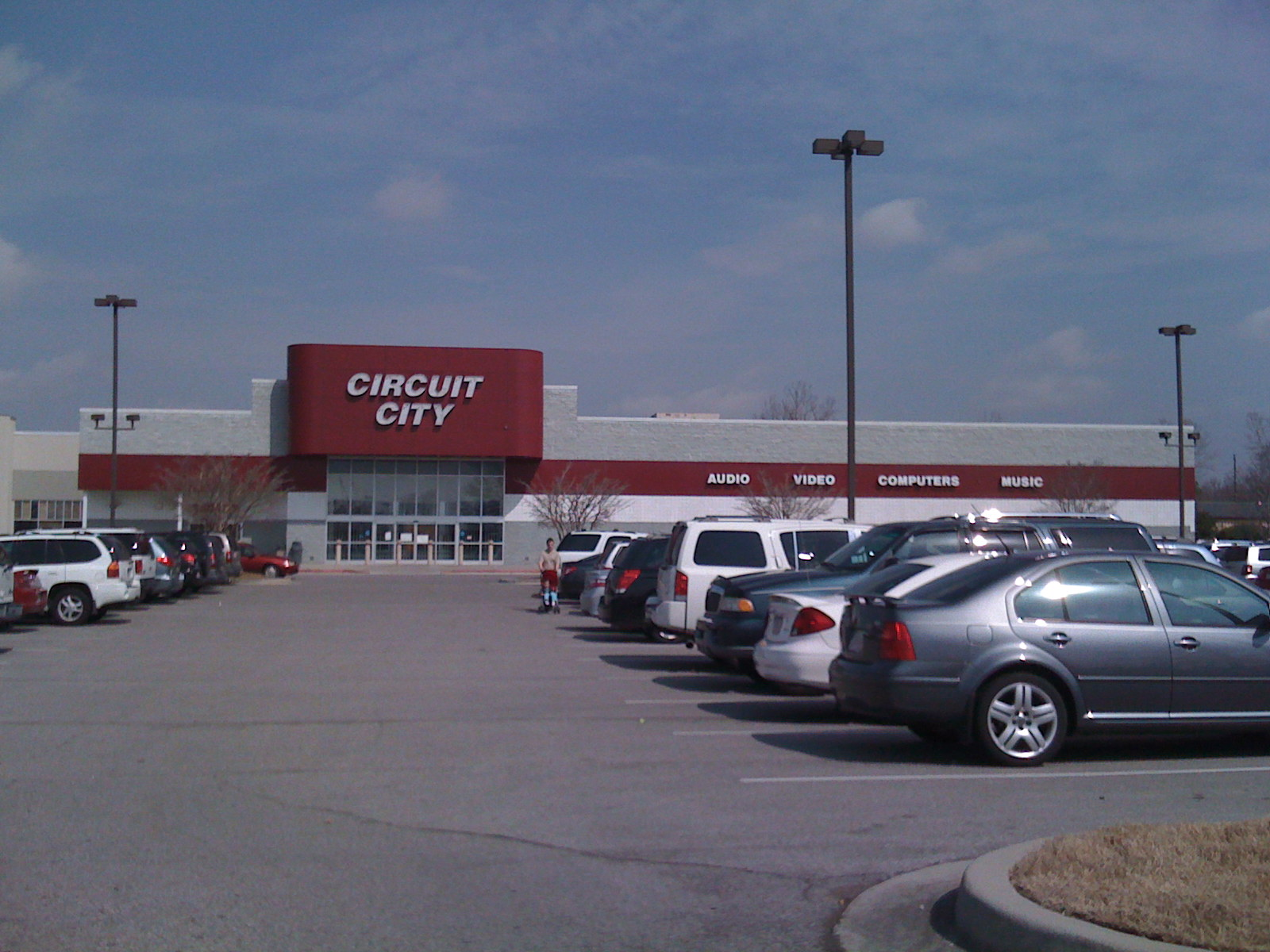
"Half Plug" Circuit City Superstore format in Huntsville, Alabama that included a more open showroom, used from 1995 to 2000.

Wards Company officially changed its name to Circuit City Stores, Inc., and became listed on the New York Stock Exchange in 1984. One of the company's early slogans was "Circuit City — Where the Streets are Paved with Bargains". The company, which had leased floor space from the Zodys discount stores as well as other department stores, began acquiring retail stores and turning them into Circuit City Superstores. The first of these replacements occurred in Knoxville, Tennessee; Charleston, South Carolina; and Hampton, Virginia.

In 1981, Circuit City entered the New York City market by acquiring the six remaining stores of the bankrupt Lafayette Radio chain. They operated the stores under the "Lafayette/Circuit City" name and expanded to 15 locations, but the stores were not profitable and were closed in 1986 after spending US$20 million (~$49.8 million in 2025) to enter the market.

In 1985, Circuit City entered the Los Angeles market by opening seven Superstore locations in former The Akron discount stores. The next year, Circuit City opened five more Superstores in the market and closed the licensed electronics and appliance departments it operated in Zodys stores. The new stores featured the "red tower" entrance that ultimately became a trademark of the company. The towers were designed to make the store more identifiable to drivers among the endless stores and shopping centers in Los Angeles.

In 1988, Circuit City began constructing the new "plug" design Superstore formats. The company also returned to New York City, opening a 40,000 sq ft (3,700 m^{2}) superstore in Union Square, the first of two planned Manhattan locations. In late 1988, Circuit City had an opportunity to purchase Best Buy, a growing competitor at the time, for US$30 million (~$70.4 million in 2025). The offer was rejected by Richard Sharp, Circuit City's CEO, since he believed they could open a store in Best Buy's home territory of Minneapolis and easily beat the competitor.

During this era, Circuit City became known for its exceptional service, going so far as to have many of its staff factory-trained. Its slogan, likewise, was "Welcome to Circuit City, Where Service Is State of the Art".

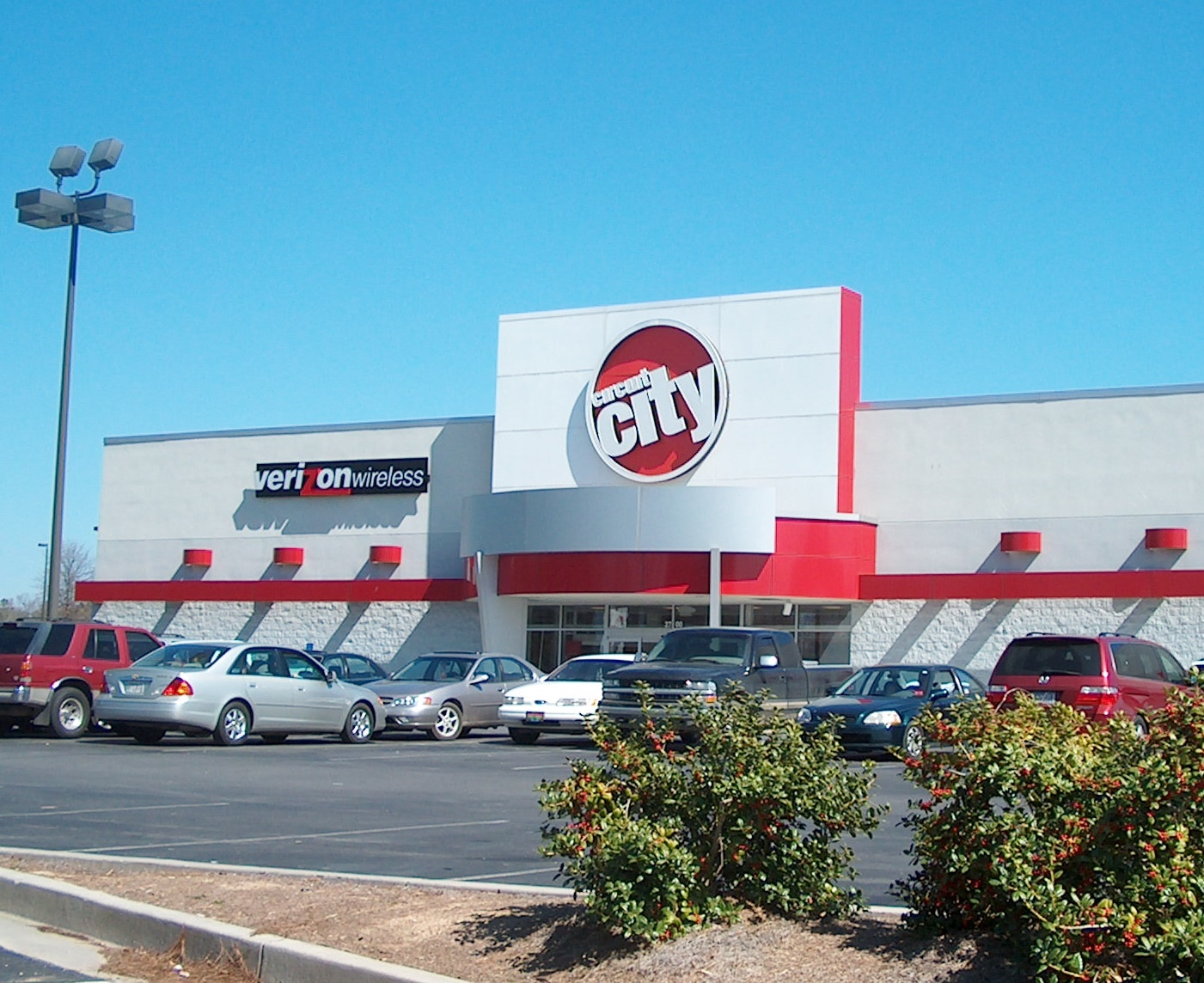
Horizon format in Rome, Georgia, used in 2000.

Many Circuit City stores were out-of-date and in bad locations, unable to compete with newer Best Buy stores. In 2000, Circuit City moved away from the Superstore showroom format and introduced a new more self-service "Big Box" format called "Horizon." The new format eliminated the red tower entrances and moved the entrance to the center of the store. The selling floor was enlarged with lower sight lines and the race track was removed. A central checkout was located at the front of the store and shopping baskets were added for small items. Appliances were eliminated to make room for games, computer peripherals, and other small electronics. The plan was to open stand-alone major appliance stores, but later that plan was dropped. One new store in Jacksonville, Florida incorporated the new design and twenty-five existing Florida stores were remodeled to this format.

In July 2000, Circuit City abandoned the large appliance business in all stores to make space for more small electronics. This was controversial because in the previous year Circuit City was the second largest appliance retailer in the United States, behind only Sears. The company had earned nearly US$1.6 billion in sales revenue from large appliances in 1999. However, executives were concerned about the competition from Home Depot and Lowe's and believed there would be big savings in warehouse storage and delivery costs if they quit the large appliance business. It was later realized that Circuit City thus missed out on the residential housing boom of the mid-2000s, which saw a dramatic rise in new-appliance sales.

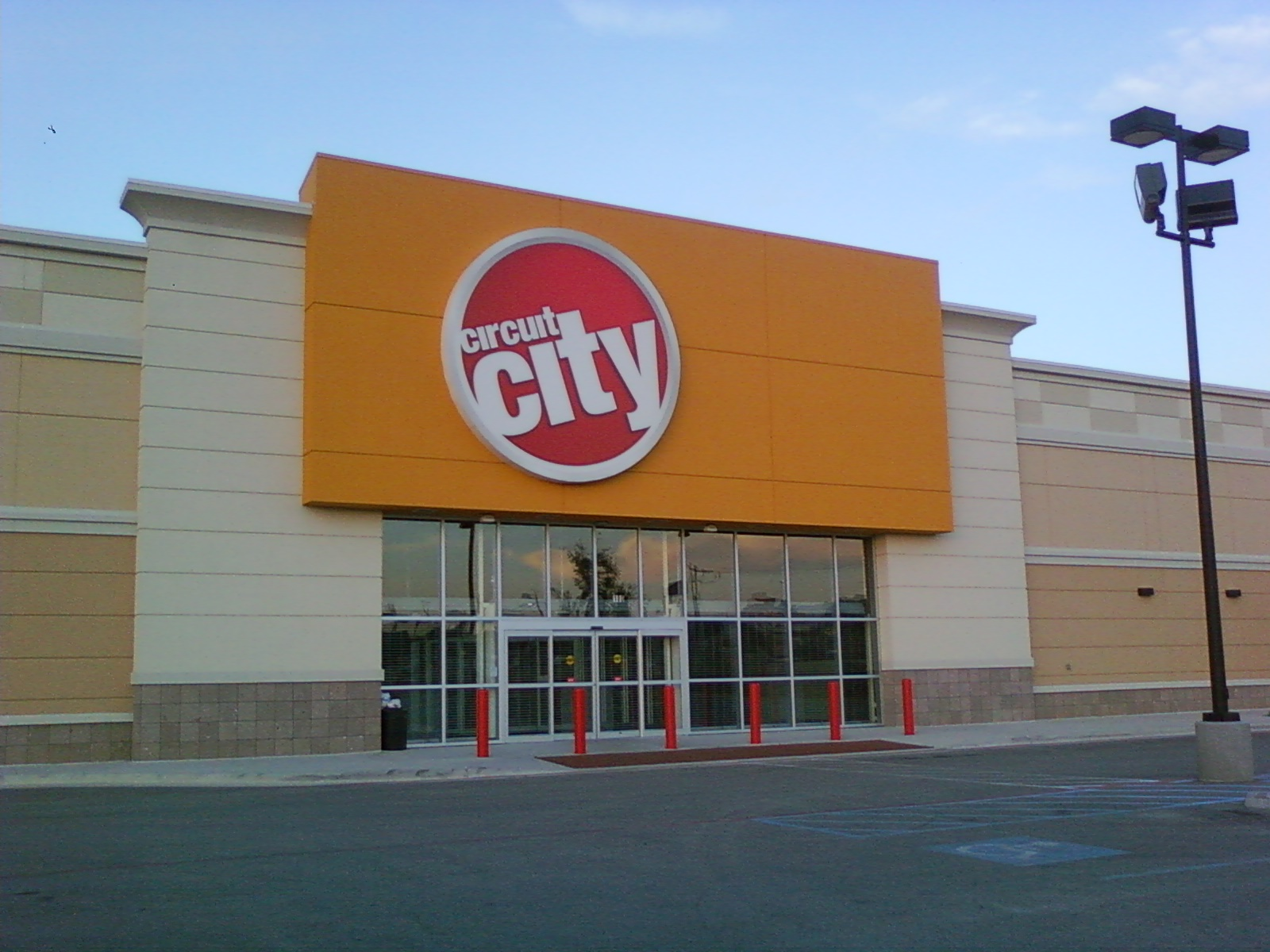
Tide format in Denton, Texas, opened in 2007, used from 2001 to 2007

Every Superstore was retrofitted after the exit from the large-appliance business, using the space for an expanded self-serve computer accessory and software selection. Under an exclusive agreement with Sony, the only games that had been sold at the stores were PlayStation games. The new space allowed them to sell Nintendo, Sega, and eventually Xbox games after the agreement ended. Music and movie sales had been added to most stores years before, but the extra space allowed the selection to be added to smaller stores. The retrofitting project alone cost the company US$1.5 billion.

Another store format, called "Tide", was created based on research conducted that found women and teenagers were not respected by the Circuit City sales staff. The front of the store featured windows allowing customers to see in and the signage was improved. Power poles and movable fixtures allowed for easy rearrangement of the store and lowered the cost of remodeling older locations since the floor did not need to be trenched. In 2001, Chicago stores were remodeled with parts of this format and all new locations opened with this design.

In March 2002, Circuit City purchased the key assets for 800.com, which included their entire 2.6 million customer list, websites, and marketing assets. Financial terms of the deal were not disclosed.

In 2003, Circuit City converted to a single hourly pay structure in all stores, eliminating commissioned sales. Many previously commissioned sales associates were offered new positions as hourly "product specialists", while 3,900 salespeople were laid off, saving the company about $130 million per year. Many company insiders later revealed that they thought this was the most influential company decision that would ultimately lead to its demise. That same year they rejected $1.5 billion ($8 per share) buyout offer by CompUSA.

In 2004, with the expansion of the wireless phone market, Circuit City partnered with Verizon Wireless to include full-service Verizon Wireless sales and service centers in each Superstore. These locations were owned and staffed by Verizon Wireless. Circuit City stopped selling wireless phones with all other carriers due to the agreement.

In April 2004, Circuit City announced its purchase of Canadian retailer InterTAN. Circuit City paid approximately US$284 million for InterTAN's 980 stores, which operated in Canada under the trade names RadioShack, Rogers Plus, and Battery Plus. Chairman and CEO Alan McCollough believed these existing small-format stores provided an easy entry into Canada, a country where Best Buy had been expanding. RadioShack sued InterTan in April 2004 over the branding use of RadioShack in Canada. Circuit City lost the lawsuit and all Canadian locations were renamed The Source by Circuit City in 2005. These stores were sold to Bell Canada and continue to operate.

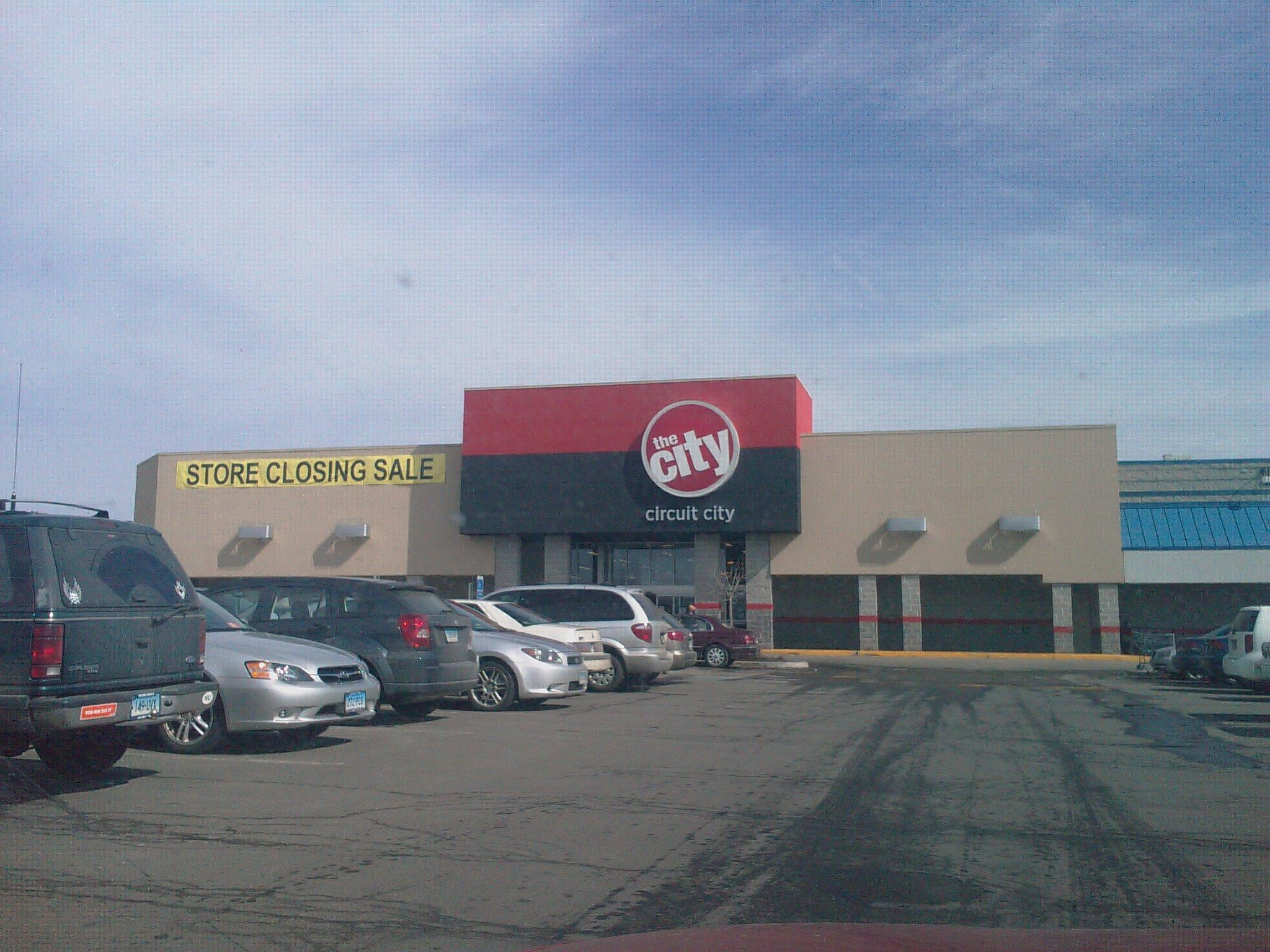
Circuit City's most recent store format nicknamed "The City", used from 2008 to 2009. Note the effects of a liquidation sale (including a "store closing sale" banner on the left) occurring on March 7, 2009, at Torrington, Connecticut.

In 2007, a new 20,000-square-foot (1,900 m^{2}) store format was introduced as "The City" and designed to eliminate previously under-utilized space. The smaller format gave the company greater flexibility to enter new markets and backfill existing ones. Most new store openings in 2008 used this new store format.

On February 8, 2007, Circuit City announced that it planned to close seven domestic Superstores and a Kentucky distribution center to cut costs and improve its financial performance. News reports also mention that 62 stores in Canada were to close.

Circuit City announced on February 23, 2007, that its chief financial officer, Michael Foss, would leave the company. This unsettled investors and analysts, who were concerned about management turnover. "This represents the third departure of a senior executive in he past six months, and the second departure of a top-five executive in the past month", said Goldman Sachs analyst Matthew Fassler in a client note. Chief Executive Officer Phil Schoonover's "hand-picked team is turning over faster than we would like to see in a turnaround situation."

In 2007, the starting wage for new employees was dropped from $8.75 an hour down to $7.40 an hour ($6.55 being the federal minimum wage at the time). In a press release on March 28, 2007, Circuit City announced that in a "wage management" decision, it had laid off approximately 3400 better-paid associates and would re-staff the positions at the lower market-based salaries. Laid-off associates were provided severance and offered a chance to be re-hired after ten weeks at prevailing wages. The Washington Post reported interviews with management concerning the firings. The Post later reported in May 2007 that the layoffs, and consequent loss of experienced sales staff, appeared to be "backfiring" and resulting in slower sales.

In April 2008, video rental firm Blockbuster announced a bid worth $1 billion (~$1.47 billion in 2025) to $1.3 billion to purchase Circuit City. In July 2008, Blockbuster withdrew its offer due to market conditions.

In August 2008, the chain's head office demanded stores destroy all copies of an issue of Mad magazine which described "Sucker City" as a chain with a long list of locations, all in proximity to each other and each adjacent to a rival Best Buy store.

Philip J. Schoonover, CEO, president and chairman of the board of Circuit City Stores, Inc. announced his immediate resignation on September 22, 2008. James A. Marcum, former vice chairman of the board, was named acting CEO. Allen King was selected chairman of the board. This switch was said to be due to a stream of losses stemming from the rapid decline of flat-panel TV prices, and possibly due to the strong call for Schoonover's removal from activist shareholder Mark Wattles.

=== Bankruptcy and liquidation ===
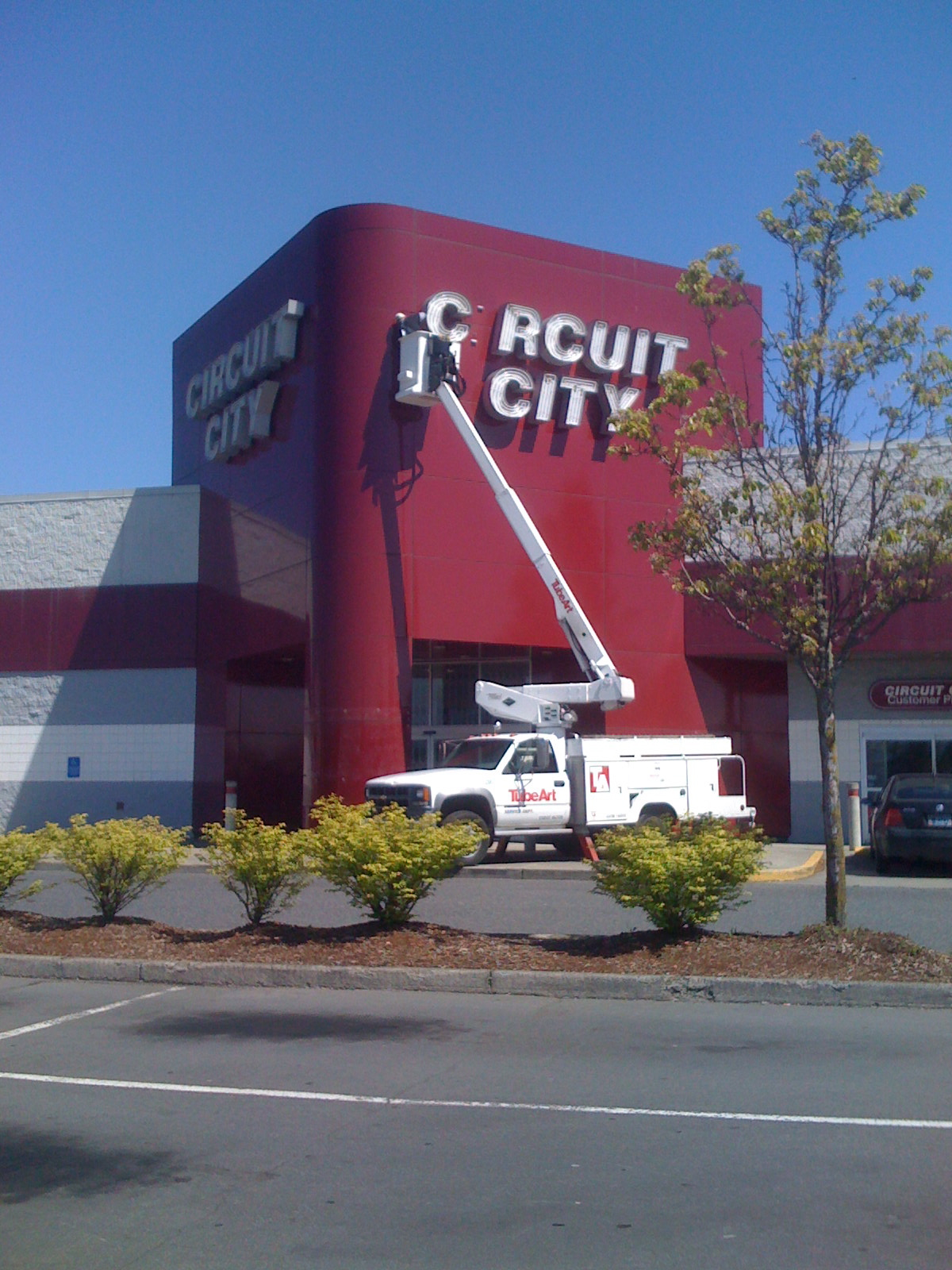
Removal of signage on a former Circuit City store in Portland, Oregon on April 30, 2009

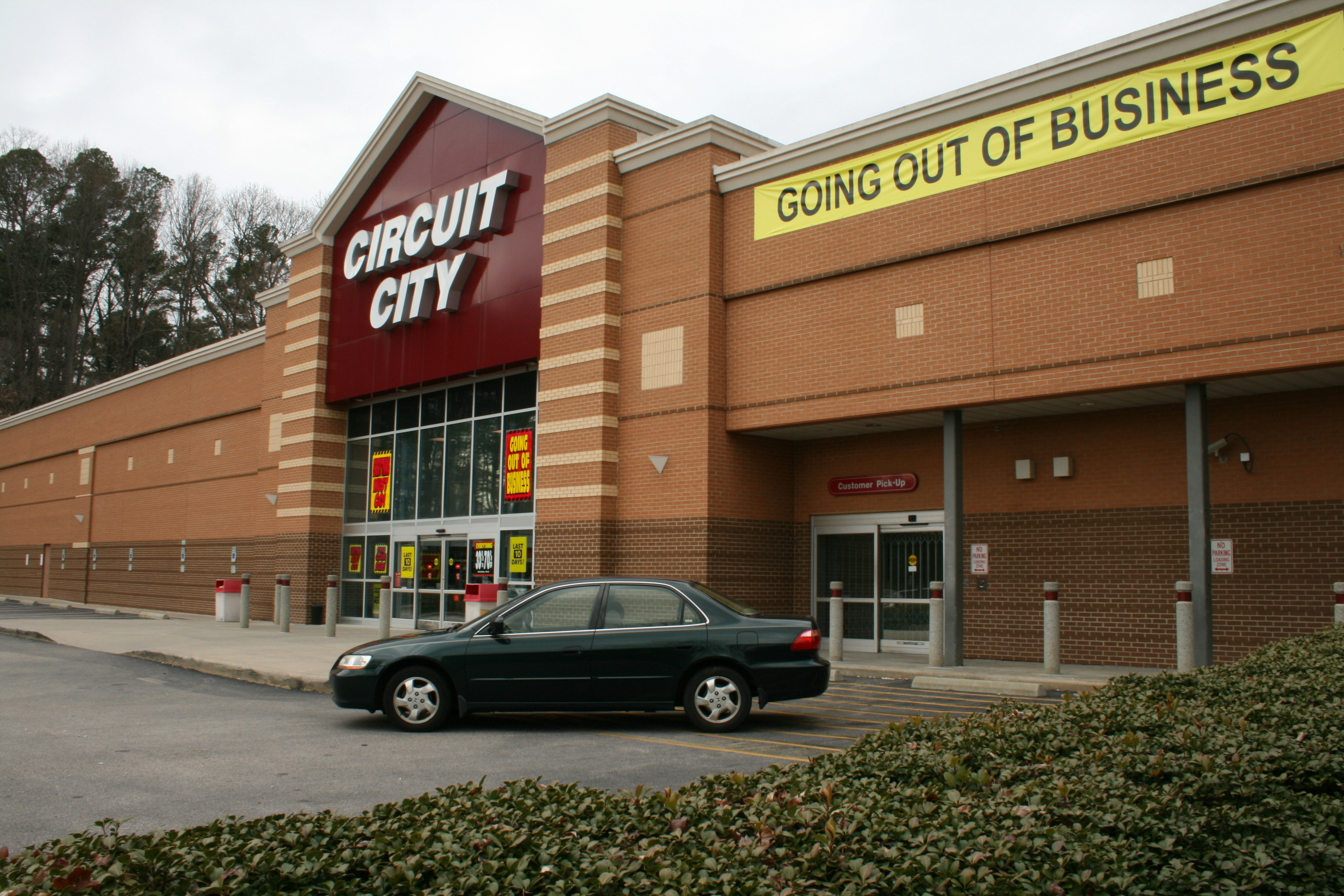
A Circuit City store under the effects of a liquidation sale in Raleigh, North Carolina on February 26, 2009.

On November 4, 2008, Circuit City announced that it would close 155 stores and lay off 17% of its workforce by the end of the year as a result of continuing difficulties in remaining profitable. On November 7, 2008, Circuit City laid off between 500 and 800 corporate employees from its Richmond, Virginia, headquarters. The approximately 1,000 remaining corporate employees were consolidated into one building, to further reduce costs and improve profitability. On November 10, 2008, Circuit City filed for bankruptcy protection under Chapter 11 of the United States Bankruptcy Code in the United States Bankruptcy Court for the Eastern District of Virginia. The Great Recession, decreased consumer spending, and competition from Best Buy were among the factors that contributed to the company's bankruptcy. At that time, Circuit City's stock traded well below $1 per share, and was removed from listing on the New York Stock Exchange.

In bankruptcy court, Circuit City was approved to borrow $1.1 billion to finance operations while restructuring. Court filings revealed that the company had assets of $3.4 billion and debt of $2.32 billion, including a $119 million debt to Hewlett-Packard and a $116 million debt to Samsung Electronics. Chief executive James A. Marcum promised that the stores would stay open and the chain would not be liquidated.

On November 18, 2008, it was announced that Ricardo Salinas Pliego, current owner of Mexican television broadcaster TV Azteca and electronics store chain Elektra, had purchased 28% of Circuit City.

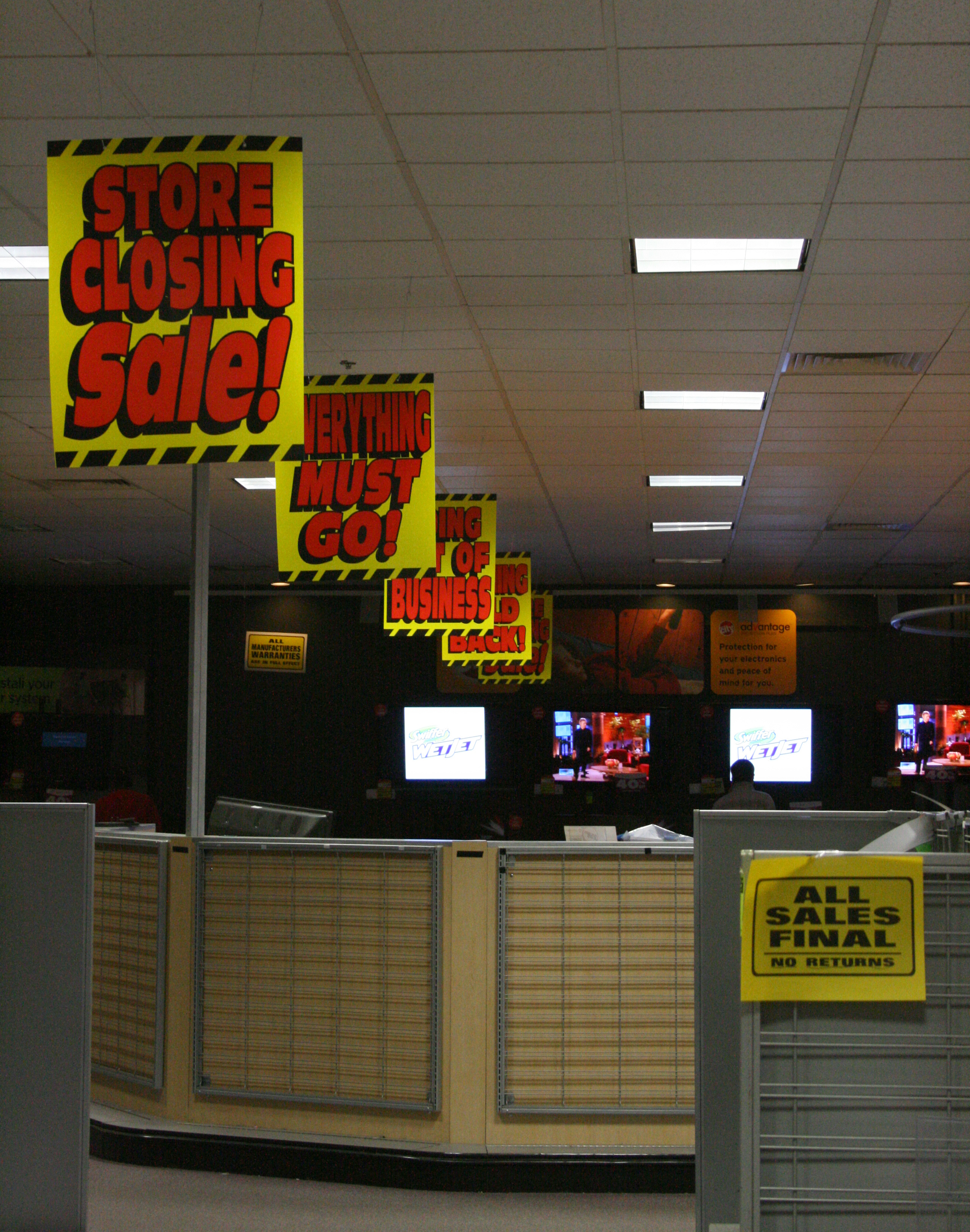
Liquidation sale at Circuit City in Raleigh, North Carolina, in February 2009

On January 10, 2009, it was announced by a company spokesman that Circuit City needed a buyer by January 16, 2009, to keep from shutting its doors due to an approaching deadline set by the court and creditors. Although two unnamed parties were interested in buying out Circuit City, a bidder could not be found, so Circuit City, with bankruptcy court approval, converted its Chapter 11 bankruptcy to Chapter 7, and started airing "going out of business" commercials, as they started closing all of their stores. The Canadian operations, which were run under The Source by Circuit City banner, were not initially affected by the liquidation, but were later sold to Bell Canada.

According to Circuit City's website, the company announced on January 16, 2009, that it intended to liquidate all of its stores. Reportedly, over 30,000 employees lost their jobs in the liquidation, as well as 45% of Verizon's Circuit City sales force being laid off with the remainder resigning or transferring to other Verizon locations.

The final day of operations for all Circuit City stores was March 8, 2009. Besides retail auto dealerships, Circuit City closed more retail locations in the U.S. than any other retail chain in 2009. Circuit City selected Great American Group LLC, Hudson Capital Partners LLC, SB Capital Group LLC, and Tiger Capital Group LLC to handle the liquidation of all stores nationwide. Liquidation was completed on March 9, 2009.

During the liquidation of all Circuit City stores across the nation, the company's online store was closed, and it was replaced with a page that read:

Circuit City would like to thank all of the customers who have shopped with us over the past 60 years. Unfortunately, we announced on January 16, 2009, that we are going out of business.

— Circuit City Stores, Inc., via its webpage

Circuit City's exit also affected the strategy of its major rival, Best Buy. A 2019 study of all U.S. Best Buy stores before and after Circuit City's withdrawal found that Best Buy primarily responded by expanding product variety in markets where the two retailers had been colocated, while it more often opened new stores in markets where they had not been colocated. The study also found that product-variety expansion was smaller when Best Buy opened new stores, suggesting that expansion in product and geographic space served as alternative responses to the rival's exit.

=== Purchase by Systemax ===
Systemax, Inc., in April 2009, signed a stalking horse agreement for $6.5 million (~$9.47 million in 2025), which was an initial offer for the bankrupt Circuit City's assets.

On May 13, 2009, it was announced that Systemax had purchased the Circuit City brand name, trademarks, and e-commerce website for US$14 million (~$20.4 million in 2025) at auction from Circuit City Stores, Inc. on May 11, with the deal set to take effect on May 19. Systemax relaunched the CircuitCity.com website on May 22, 2009, as an online retailer of consumer electronics. Systemax had earlier acquired both CompUSA and TigerDirect separately, which superficially continued to operate as separate online retailers with the same website formats and product catalog along with the new CircuitCity.com site. The revived site's front page initially looked similar to the original front page, while other pages were similar in appearance and functionality to the other two sites. All three sites eventually transitioned into slightly rebranded mirrors of each other.

On November 2, 2012, it was announced that Systemax would drop both the CompUSA and Circuit City storefront brands by consolidating their businesses under the TigerDirect brand and website. This ended, after 63 years, the use of the Circuit City brand name.

=== Circuit City Corporation ===
Circuit City Corporation
- Type: Private
- Industry: Consumer electronics retail
- Predecessors: Circuit City Stores Inc; TigerDirect (2009–2016 with stores, online until 2023)
- Founded: 2016; 10 years ago
- Founder: Ronny Shmoel
- Headquarters: New York City, United States
- Products: Consumer electronics
- Owner: Ronny Shmoel (2016–present)
- Website: circuitcity.com

It was reported in January 2016 that the Circuit City brand would be revived as Circuit City Corporation by area retail veteran Ronny Shmoel, who acquired the brand from Systemax. Circuit City was originally set to reopen in June 2016, but the postponed relaunch was announced at CES for February 15, 2018. On August 22, 2018, Circuit City Corporation officially relaunched the brand name as an online retailer and announced plans to begin operating as a store-within-a-store chain. It also planned to open some new Circuit City retail stores in the future, but that never materialized. On December 13, 2023, Circuit City announced its intention to raise US$25M. Shmoel aims to establish strategic alliances (in alternative to brick-and-mortar stores) with undisclosed national enterprises (potentially including JCPenney) to launch a "Powered by Circuit City" initiative.

== Former subsidiaries ==
=== CarMax ===
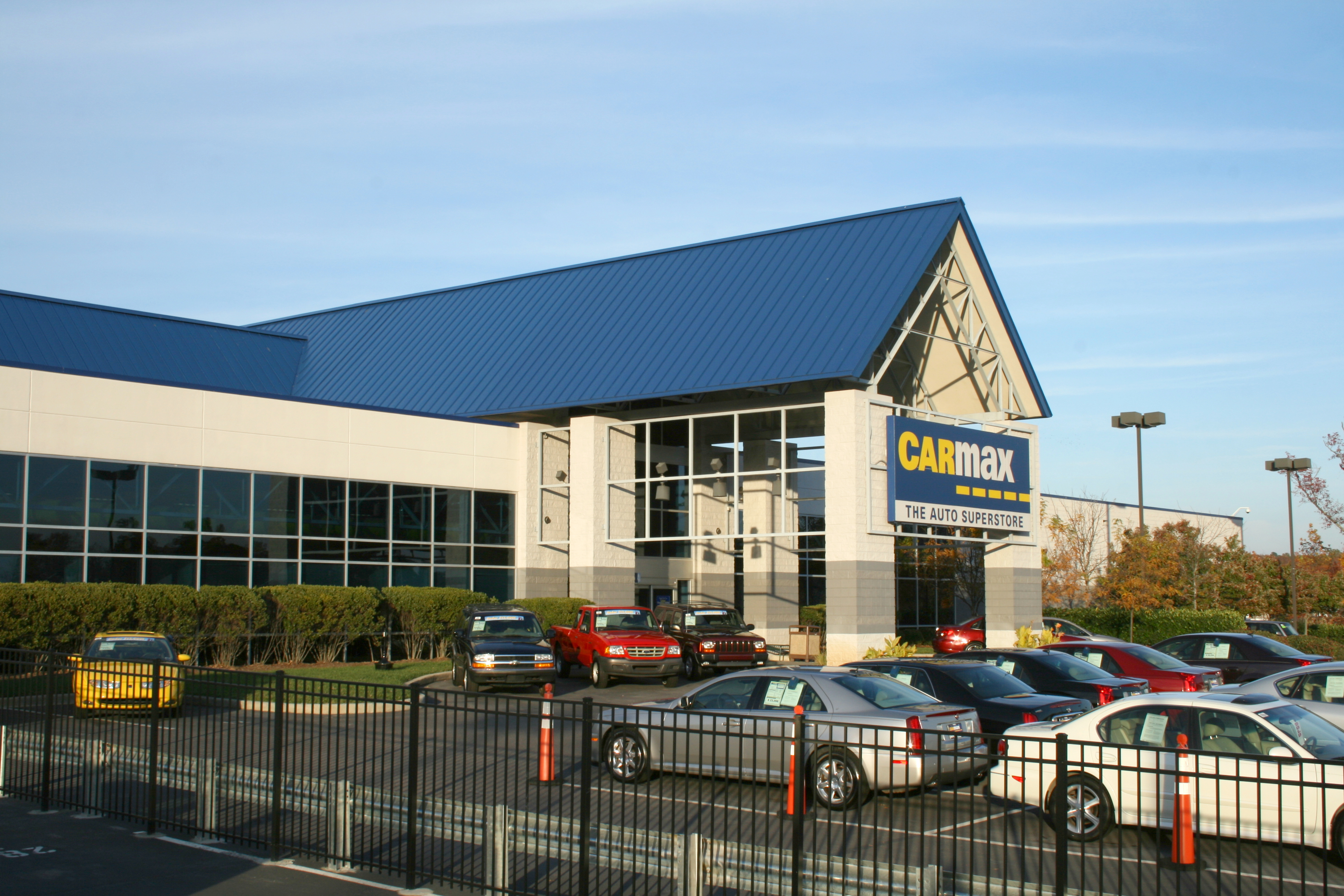
CarMax auto superstore in Raleigh, North Carolina

CarMax is a used car auto superstore concept developed in 1991 at Circuit City by Austin Ligon, then Circuit City's Senior VP of Planning, and Rick Sharp, then Circuit City CEO. The goal of CarMax was to revolutionize used car retailing through a combination of large selection (400+ used cars at each store); low, no-haggle pricing; guaranteed quality; and a consumer-friendly shopping experience. The first location opened in Richmond, Virginia in September 1993. CarMax grew slowly for its first four years as the team refined the basic concept, then went public through an IPO as a "tracking stock" (KMX) of Circuit City in February 1997. The offering was managed by Morgan Stanley and Goldman Sachs, and raised more than $400m for a 20% interest in the company, with Circuit City retaining the remaining 80% ownership. CarMax used the proceeds to repay Circuit City's initial $170mm investment in the company, then used the remainder to grow rapidly, adding 27 more stores from 1997 to 2000, and turning its first profit in FY2001. Circuit City sold a further 10% of its interest in CarMax in July 2001 for $140mm (~$243 million in 2025), with proceeds going to Circuit City. CarMax was spun off from Circuit City in tax-free distribution to shareholders in October 2002 to allow both companies to grow and be valued independently. The stock distribution provided Circuit City shareholders with KMX stock valued at over $1.2bn (~$2.05 billion in 2025) at the time of the spin off in 2002.

=== Circuit City Express ===
Circuit City Express was a chain of mall-based Circuit City stores with over 50 locations at its peak. The first locations opened in Baltimore, Maryland; Richmond, Virginia; and McLean, Virginia in 1989. The stores were originally known as Impulse, but were later renamed in 1993 to focus on the strength of the Circuit City brand. These stores focused on small electronic products for personal use or to be given as gifts. Cellular phones were a major focus of the business since all major carriers were sold until the exclusive agreement with Verizon Wireless in 2004. Circuit City Express stores offered Superstore prices and the Circuit City "Price Match Guarantee" in a mall environment. Most of the locations closed in the early 2000s as their original 10-year leases expired. There was also a Circuit City Express location inside Charlestowne Mall in Saint Charles, Illinois.

=== Connect ===
Connect was a store concept operated as a joint venture between Circuit City and Comcast. These small stores offered Comcast cable services, plus select electronics and Firedog tech support services from Circuit City. The first Connect store opened in Medford, Massachusetts in December 2006, followed by a second in nearby Burlington in May 2007.

=== DIVX ===
DIVX was developed by Circuit City and launched in 1997 as an alternative to DVD. DIVX discs cost $5 each, but could only be played for 48 hours on proprietary set-top players before a continuation fee was required to continue viewing. The player was connected to a phone line to check whether the disc was still valid. Opposition to the format and limited acceptance by the public led Circuit City to discontinue the format in 1999. Circuit City took a US$114 million loss to close its DIVX division.

=== Firedog ===
Firedog was launched in August 2006 to provide in-store, in-home, and online computer and home theatre technical support and installation services in competition with other retailers' consumer and business technical services offerings such as Best Buy's Geek Squad and Staples' EasyTech. The Firedog brand was sold to Firstmark for US$250,000 (~$364,103 in 2025) in September 2009, approximately six months after the liquidation of all Circuit City stores.

=== First North American National Bank ===
First North American National Bank was created by Circuit City to operate its private-label credit card in 1990. In 2002, Circuit City began offering a co-branded Visa credit card. It sold both of these operations in 2004 to Bank One (now Chase Bank).

=== Patapsco Designs ===
Patapsco Designs was acquired by Circuit City in 1987. The company was in charge of designing product displays and other electronic services for Circuit City. Patapsco Designs was founded in 1977 and is based in Frederick, Maryland and in November 2004 was acquired by American Computer Development Inc. Patapsco Designs, Inc. filed a voluntary petition for reorganization under Chapter 11 Bankruptcy in joint administration with Circuit City Stores, Inc. in November 2008.

== Litigation ==
In 2004, RadioShack sued InterTAN to prematurely terminate its role as reseller for the Radio Shack line in Canada; the stores rebranded as "The Source by Circuit City". In 2005, InterTAN sued RadioShack in an attempt to prevent it from re-entering the Canadian marketplace as a direct competitor; while this effort failed, the nine new RadioShack-branded stores closed their doors by 2007.

In 2005, Circuit City agreed to pay $173,220 in settlement and investigation reimbursement costs due to a false advertising claim in a 2004 New Jersey court case. The court found that important information about sale items was purposely obscured within the advertisement, thus potentially deceiving customers.

Circuit City's City Advantage Plan was also challenged in a United States District Court in Massachusetts. The plaintiffs' claim concerned Circuit City's cancellation of its warranty plan without full disclosure of the plan at the time of sale. The plaintiffs cited breach of contract, unjust enrichment, and violation of the Massachusetts Consumer Protection Act. Circuit City requested the matter be dismissed. The court, however, upheld the plaintiffs' claim that the monies paid for the protection plan be reimbursed and credit be issued for non-working goods returned.

Liquidators handling the sale of remaining Circuit City inventory have also become the target of consumer complaints, not only for often-uncompetitive pricing of items but also for an "all sales final" policy which allows the sale of defective or damaged merchandise at former Circuit City locations with no recourse afforded to the consumer.

== Real estate holdings ==
Due to the expansion of Circuit City stores in the 1970s–1990s, the company accumulated a surplus of unused real estate with a presence in nearly every major market in the country. Although a typical retail location is approximately 30,000 square feet (2700 m^{2}), the company had numerous freestanding and in-line locations ranging from 2,000 to 50,000 square feet (180 to 4500 m^{2}), and had surplus office, service and distribution locations scattered across the country. During Circuit City's 2005 fiscal year (March 1, 2004, through February 28, 2005), the company disposed of approximately 1.2 million square feet (108,000 m^{2}) of vacant retail space. In January 2007, Circuit City's vice president for real estate announced plans to open 200–300 stores in the next two years, a large increase from the current trend of 10–12 stores a year. Due to the economic conditions the company faced, they did not reach that goal. Many of these stores, however, did open in 2008 and operated for only a few weeks before closing. Some were built and never opened, and upon the company's declaration of bankruptcy, it was discovered that large expenditures were due to paying leases on buildings that were not even opened to the public.

In January 2010, the main Circuit City headquarters building was put up for sale. The five-story 288,650-square-foot (26,816 m^{2}) office building, "Deep Run I", had been appraised at $46.2 million. New York–based Lexington Property Trust defaulted on a $17 million commercial mortgage and the lender foreclosed on the property. The asking price was set at $11 million. The former headquarters was sold in September 2010, for $3 million (~$4.32 million in 2025) to DRCC Properties, LLC. They also bought the 58 acres (23 ha) of land that the building sits on for $2.75 million.

== See also ==
- A Tale of Two Cities: The Circuit City Story
- Best Buy
- CompUSA
- The Good Guys!
- Tweeter
- hhgregg
