= Tandy Electronics =

Australian electronics retailer

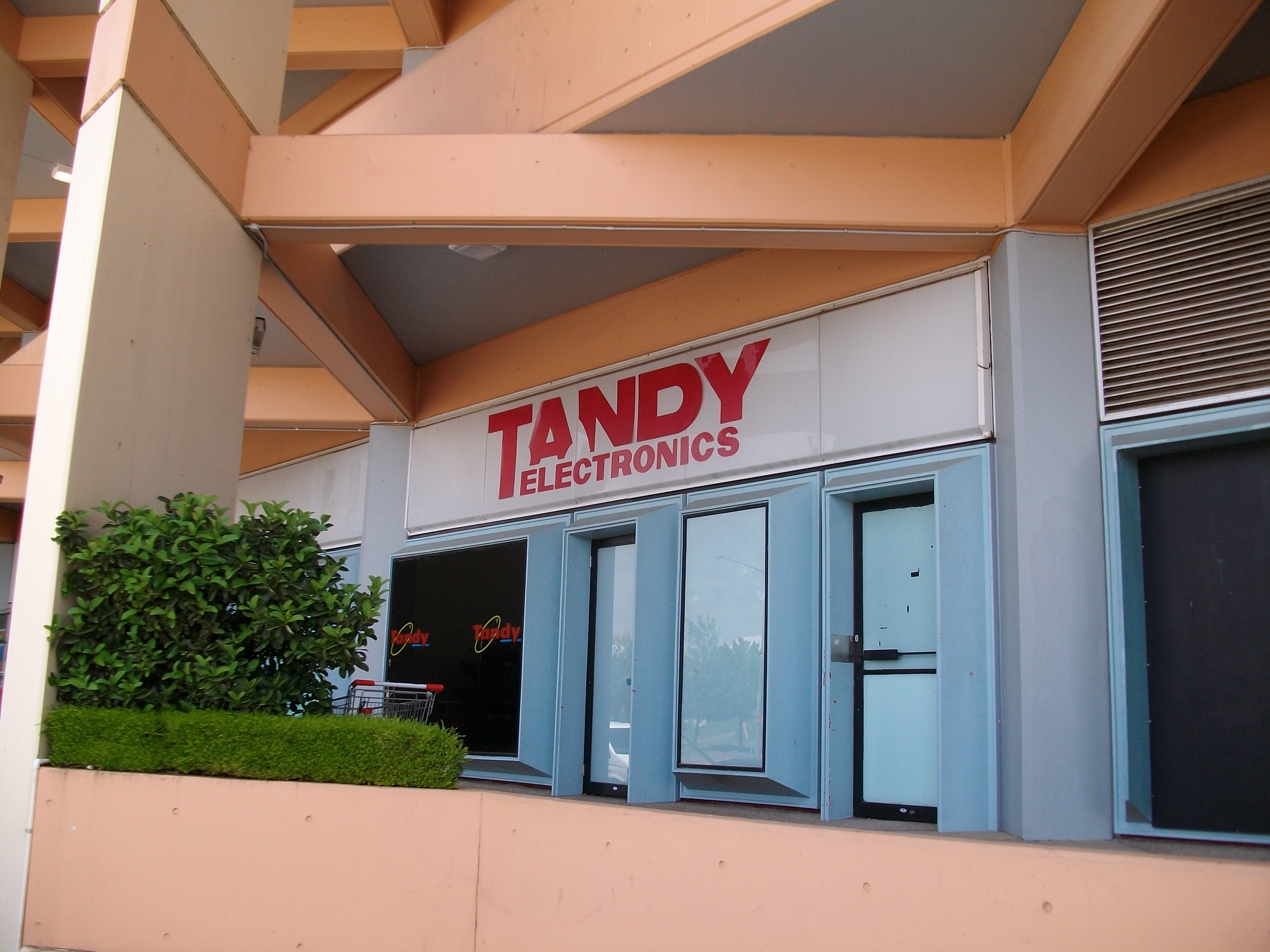
- Tandy Electronics store at Westfield Belconnen
- Type: Retail
- Industry: Retail
- Founded: 1973
- Defunct: 2011
- Headquarters: Melbourne, Australia
- Products: Consumer electronics
- Parent: Woolworths Group

Tandy Electronics was an electronics retailer in Australia originally operated by the American Tandy Corporation, later International Tandy (InterTAN), acquired in 2001 by Woolworths Group. The brand ceased to exist after it was phased out by Woolworths Limited in 2011.

== History ==
Tandy was founded in the United States in 1919 as Tandy Leather Company. In 1963, Tandy changed its business to electronics when it acquired control of RadioShack, a forty year old electronics business with nine stores and a mail order arm. From 1963 to 1986, RadioShack grew to more than 6900 stores and dealers in the United States, with a further 2,100 stores and dealers in Canada, Europe and Australia.

In November 1973, the first RadioShack style Tandy stores in Australia opened for business. They were administered from a rented office and warehouse in the Sydney suburb of Rydalmere. Tandy met with stiff opposition from local businessman Dick Smith who complained

"Tandy are prepared to operate for a period of five years at a financial loss to set up in Australia ... This is not free enterprise, it is not competition, it is totally unfair ... why should a foreign firm be allowed by the Australian Government to take over the Australian market from the Australian people and remain 99 per cent foreign owned?"

Tandy quickly established stores in major towns and suburbs across Australia and had a major presence by 1980. Many independent electrical businesses in smaller towns added Tandy products to their range. It was incorporated in 1982, under the name Tandy Australia Limited. In 1983, as a direct result of the rapid expansion, Tandy built and moved into a $6 million Home Office and Distribution Centre located at Mt. Druitt in the west of Sydney.

Tandy in Australia were especially well known for their audio and radio products, most of which carried their Realistic own brand label. Their business expanded rapidly during the CB radio boom of the middle of the 1970s, and the personal computer boom later. Their TRS-80 series of computers was particularly well known.

In 1986, Tandy Corporation decided to create a new corporation to manage its international operations. Tandy spun off retail operations in Canada, Australia and Europe under a new company, International Tandy, with the object of giving the companies in those countries more autonomy for better growth and profitability. At the time, there were 350 stores in Australia.

Tandy's position in the market had some similarities with its local competitor, Dick Smith Electronics. Both companies produced a substantial annual catalogue, though Tandy's was more consumer-oriented with no data section. Its CB radio ranges were similar to DSE but its amateur radio gear range was limited, focusing on scanners and shortwave radio. In 2000, Tandy launched its ecommerce business, as announced in November 1999.

== Acquisition by Woolworths ==
In April 2001, Woolworths Group acquired Tandy Electronics for $112.6 million from InterTAN Australia Limited (a subsidiary of International Tandy). Tandy had 222 stores at the time. Despite also owning Dick Smith Electronics, the Tandy stores continued to trade as separate entities until the phasing out of the Tandy brand by Woolworths in 2011.

== See also ==
- Tandy Corporation
- RadioShack
- Dick Smith (retailer)
- Jaycar
- Woolworths Group
