= Byrd Leavell =

- Born: Charlottesville, Virginia, U.S.
- Education: University of Virginia
- Occupation: Literary agent
- Known for: representing Tiffany Haddish, Justin Halpern, Cat Marnell and "Weird Al" Yankovic

Byrd Leavell is a literary agent and the co-head of the publishing department at United Talent Agency. Previously he was known as a named partner at the Waxman Leavell Literary Agency.

== Career ==
Leavell graduated from the University of Virginia and the Radcliffe Publishing Program. In 2012, he partnered with Scott Waxman to form the Waxman Leavell Literary Agency.

As a partner at the Waxman Leavell agency, he oversaw multiple New York Times bestsellers including #1 bestselling books Shit My Dad Says by Justin Halpern. Leavell also represents Rob Elliott, whose LOL series has sold more than 2.5 million copies. He also represented the anonymous Dutch novel Diary of an Oxygen Thief. Leavell also represents Cat Marnell, a former Lucky, XoJane and Vice blogger.

In September 2017 he began his employment at UTA. One of the first clients Leavell represented at UTA was comedian and actor Tiffany Haddish. Haddish's memoir, The Last Black Unicorn, was a debut New York Times bestseller, spending each of its first six weeks in print on the list and, as of January 2018, reaching #5 overall.

Over his career, Leavell has frequently been interviewed about publishing trends.

In 2024, Leavell was promoted to Partner at UTA.

== Selected clients ==
According to Publishers Weekly.

- Arnold Schwarzenegger
- Stephen Curry
- MrBeast
- Tiffany Haddish
- Rich Paul
- Jay Chandrasekhar
- Mark Frauenfelder
- GloZell Green
- George Karl
- Chelsea Handler
- Larry Charles
- Drew Magary
- Cat Marnell
- Patrick McEnroe
- Daniel O'Brien
- John L. Parker, Jr.
- Carol Moseley Braun
- Brian Kilmeade
- Mike Sacks
- Pete Sampras
- Scott Sigler
- Steve Spurrier
- "Weird Al" Yankovic
- Guy Raz
- Adam Savage
- Mandy Stadtmiller
- Anthony Sullivan
- Jorge Cruise
- Mat Best
