= Tandi (disambiguation) =

Tandi is a city in Chitwan District, Nepal.

Tandi may also refer to:

- Tandi, Janakpur, a village development committee in Sindhuli District, Nepal
- Tandi, Kosi, a village development committee in Morang District, Nepal
- Tandi (given name), a given name and list of notable people with the given name
- Tandi, a character in the Fallout video game series

== See also ==
- Tandy (disambiguation)
