= James Tandy (cricketer) =

English cricketer

Personal information
- Full name: James Martin Tandy
- Born: 16 January 1981 (age 45); Wolverhampton, Staffordshire, England
- Batting: Right-handed

Domestic team information
- Years: Team
- 2000–2001: Worcestershire Cricket Board

Career statistics
Competition	LA
Matches	1
Runs scored	1
Batting average	0.50
100s/50s	–/–
Top score	1
Balls bowled	–
Wickets	–
Bowling average	–
5 wickets in innings	–
10 wickets in match	–
Best bowling	–
Catches/stumpings	–/–
- Source: Cricinfo, 2 November 2010

James Martin Tandy (born 16 January 1981) is a former English cricketer. Tandy was a right-handed batsman. He was born at Wolverhampton, Staffordshire.

In 2000, he represented the Worcestershire Cricket Board in 2 List A matches against the Kent Cricket Board in the 2000 NatWest Trophy and Staffordshire in the 2001 Cheltenham & Gloucester Trophy. In his 2 List A matches, he scored a single run at a batting average of 0.50.
