= Keith Barr (businessman) =

American businessman (born 1970)

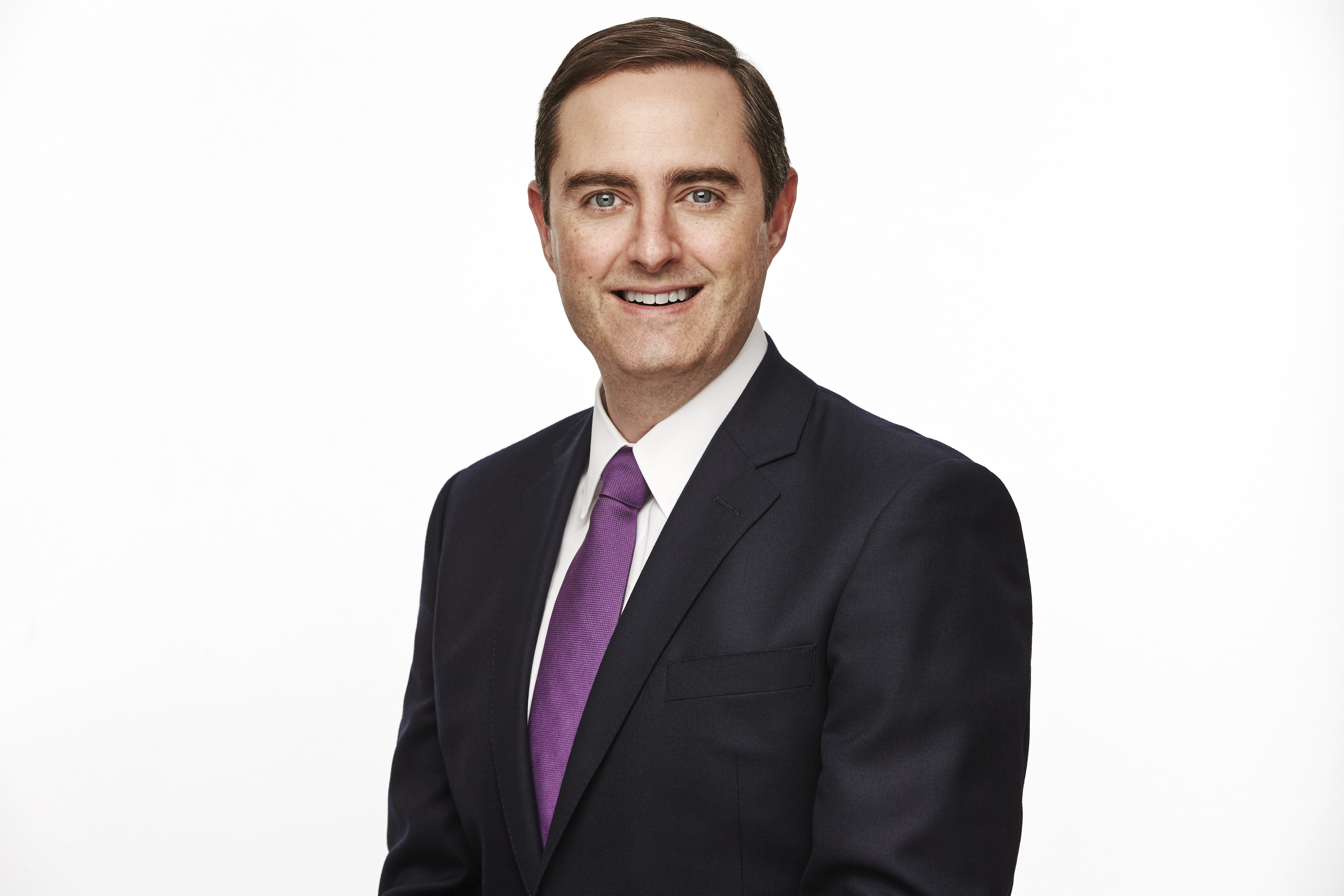
- Barr in December 2017
- Born: July 16, 1970 (age 56); Boston, Massachusetts, U.S.
- Education: Cornell University
- Title: CEO and President, CarMax
- Term: 2026–
- Predecessor: William Nash

Keith Barr (born July 16, 1970) is an American businessman. He is chief executive officer and president of CarMax, the nation's largest used-car retailer.

== Personal life and education ==
Born in Boston, Barr was educated at Saint Sebastian's School in Needham, Massachusetts, and has a degree from Cornell University's School of Hotel Administration, where he was a member of Sigma Alpha Epsilon social fraternity.

In 2023, he spoke at the Questex International Hospitality Investment Forum, telling attendees that he was moving with his family to Kailua, Hawaii, where his wife Diana was born. He and Diana have two daughters: Sophie and Tessa.

== Career ==
Bar held positions at Bristol Hotels and Resorts, until it was acquired in 2000 by IHG Hotels & Resorts in 2000. Barr led IHG from 2017 to 2023 after being the company’s chief commercial officer for four years. He also spent four years as CEO of IHG’s Greater China operating division. When Barr left IHG in July 2023, Elie W. Maalouf succeeded him as CEO.

Following his run at IHG, he spent two years at the private equity firm Sixth Street Partners. In a LinkedIn post, Barr said his role at Sixth Street was strategic advisor.

On March 16, 2026, Barr assumed the position of CEO and president of CarMax, which is headquartered in Goochland County, Virginia. When he was hired, the company said it agreed to provide him with temporary housing in the Richmond area.

== Awards and Honors ==
He joined the board of directors of MGM Resorts International in 2024 and has been on the World Travel and Tourism Council, British American Business Council, and the board of Women in Hospitality Travel & Leisure.

Barr is a non-executive director of Yum! Brands and a member of the Dean's Advisory Board for the Nolan School of Hotel Administration at Cornell SC Johnson College of Business.

In 2024, Barr received the Cornell Hospitality Icon of the Industry Award.
