= Rogers Plus =

Retail Outlet of Rogers Communications

- Type: Division of Rogers Communications
- Industry: Retail
- Founded: 1988
- Defunct: April 16, 2012
- Headquarters: Toronto, Ontario
- Products: Cable modems, home video, mobile phones, netbooks, set-top boxes, tablet computers
- Services: Rentals for home video, video games and video game consoles; sales and support of Rogers services
- Revenue: $355 million CAD (2010)
- Owner: Rogers Communications
- Number of employees: 4,500
- Website: rogersplus.ca

Rogers Plus was a brand name for the retail operations of Rogers Communications. It was formerly two separate brands, namely the Rogers Wireless chain of telecommunications stores previously operated by InterTAN under licence from Rogers, and the Rogers Video chain of video rental stores. In early 2007, Rogers retired the Rogers Video and Rogers Wireless brand names from its stores and re-branded them as Rogers Plus.

At its peak, there were over 300 Rogers Plus stores. Rogers Plus stores also provided sales and service for cable television, Internet, home phone service and wireless phone service in markets where they offered these services.

== History ==
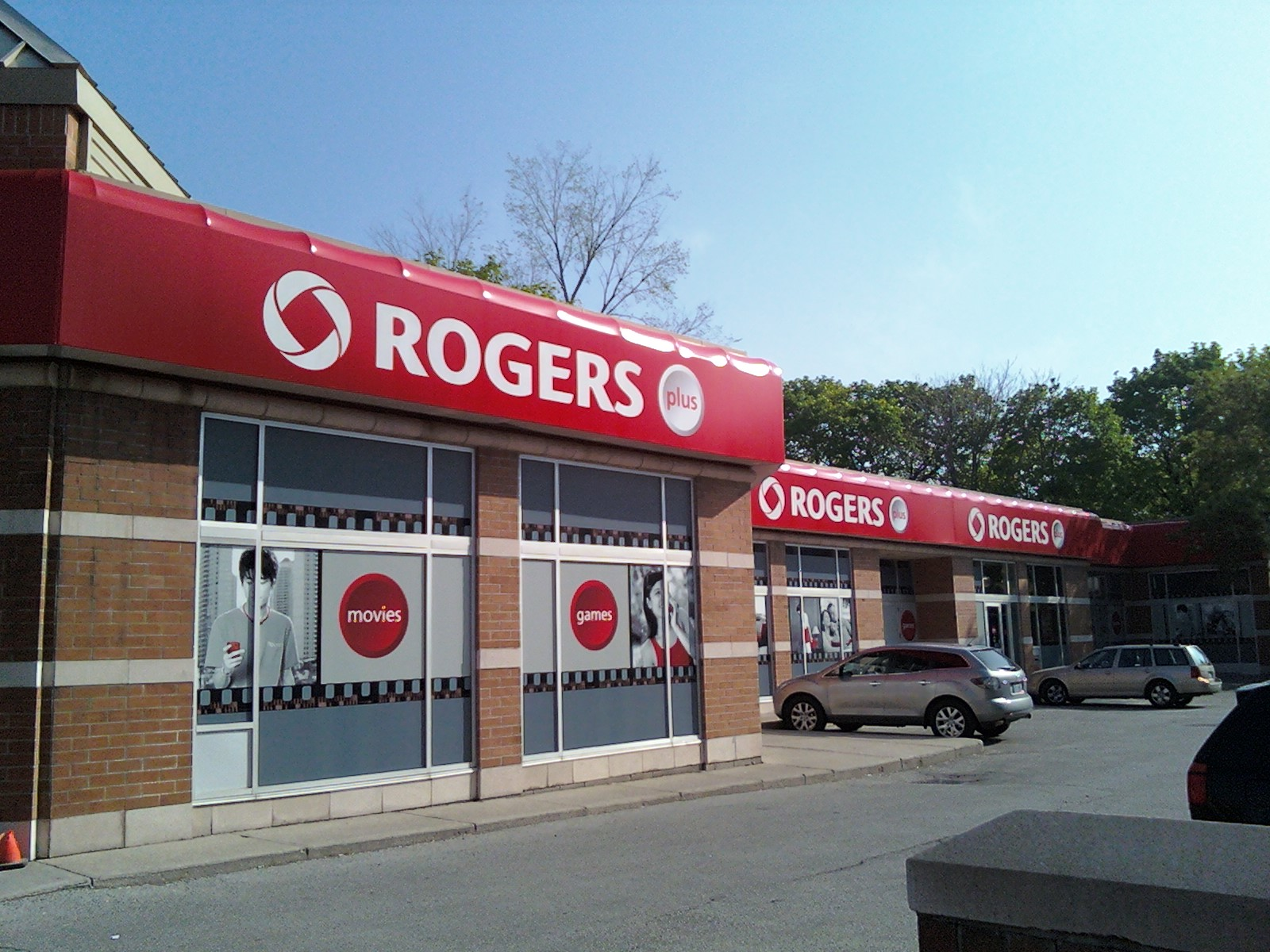
The exterior of a Rogers Plus video rental shop in Davisville, Toronto, Ontario.

=== 1980s to 1990s: inception, acquisitions and expansion ===
Rogers Video was established in 1988. The company's operations grew considerably in the 1990s through takeovers of smaller, local chains. For example, in Saskatchewan and Manitoba, Rogers took over eight stores from TVS Video Superstore and Family Video (not to be confused with the Saskatoon-based Family Video chain that became VHQ) chains. These acquisitions allowed Rogers Video to gain the title of the fifth-largest video rental shop chain in North America until its demise. In the country's National Capital Region, which mainly consists of Ottawa, the rental chain agreed to provide services in both English and French. Rogers Video also received multiple "Canadian Retailer of the Year" awards in that decade and the next to come.

=== 2000s: DVD-by-mail service and rebranding ===
In 2004, Rogers Video began a partnership with Zip.ca to provide a DVD-by-mail service called Rogers Video Direct. This allowed users to rent online and have DVDs delivered by mail. In December 2011, Rogers Video Direct closed and customers were redirected to the Zip.ca website. The company changed the name of its chain to Rogers Plus in 2007.

=== 2010s: rental business discontinued, another rebranding ===
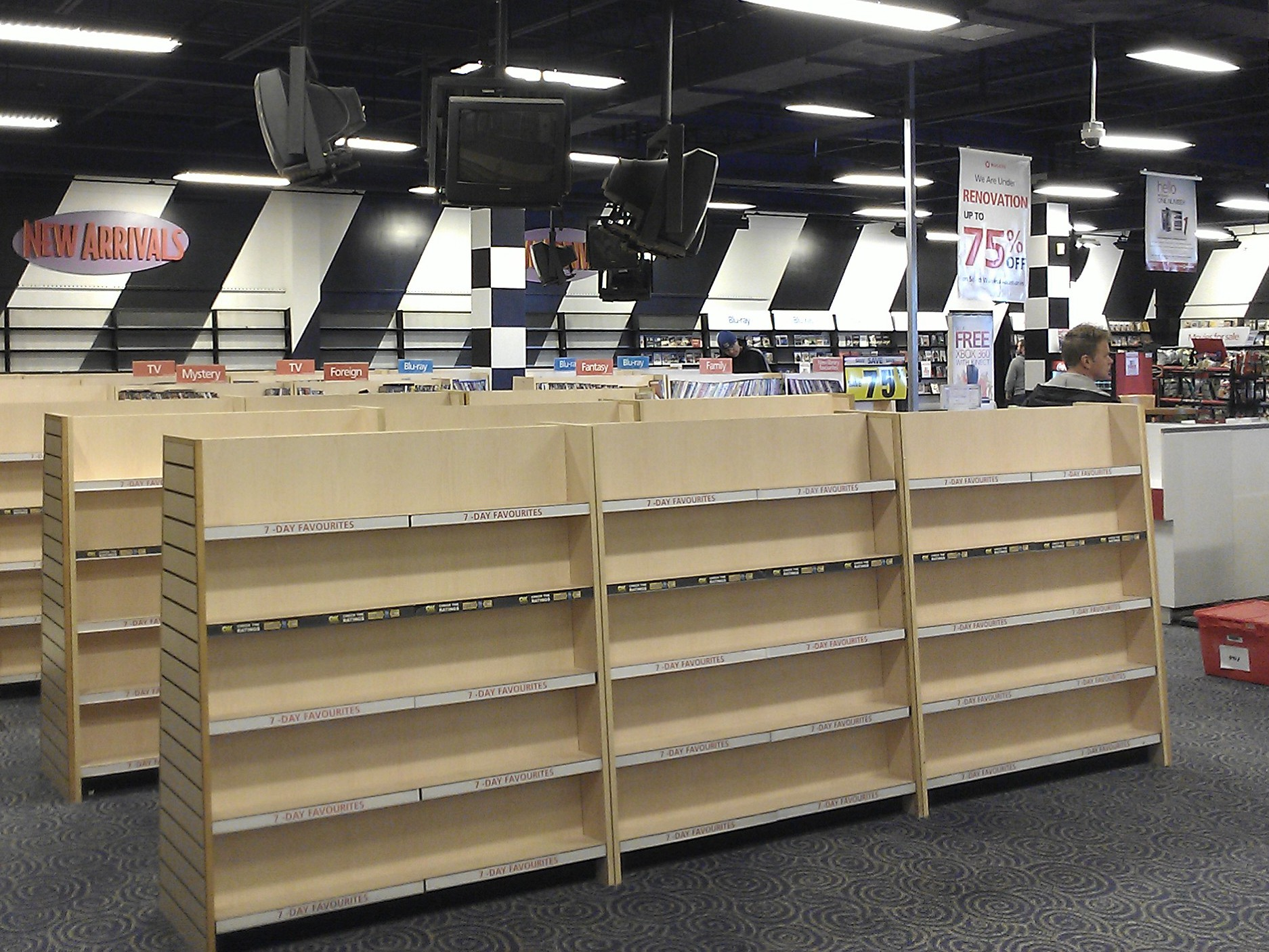
The interior of a Rogers Plus video rental shop in April 2012

Rival home video retailer Blockbuster Video Canada shut down all of its Canadian video rental stores in 2011. Following this, Rogers Plus also announced plans to shut down its video rental operations. Rogers ceased rentals on April 16, 2012 and sold all of its previously viewed rental inventory at "buy one, get one free" prices to customers. The majority of the Rogers Plus stores would remain open and continue to offer cable TV, Internet, and wireless products and services, although most of these downsized and/or relocated to smaller spaces in the same mall/plaza, as the now-redundant space for rental operations took up over half of the typical Rogers Plus store's footprint. In May 2012, the company announced in stores and on their website that they would cease renting movies and games, encouraging customers to choose Rogers Anyplace TV or Rogers On Demand instead. In October 2012, the Rogers Plus brand name was phased out and remaining stores were simply branded as Rogers stores, similar to how Bell Canada, Telus Communications, and Shaw Communications stores are branded.

== Awards ==
Rogers won multiple "Canadian Retailer of the Year" awards. Five were awarded by Premiere in 1992 and from 1994 to 1997 inclusive. Four more were awarded by Entertainment Merchants Association in 1993, 1995 and 1997.

== See also ==
- Video rental shop
- List of Canadian companies
- Redbox
