= A Tale of Two Cities: The Circuit City Story =

- Directed by: Tom Wulf
- Produced by: Tom Wulf
- Edited by: Tom Wulf
- Release date: November 2010 (Virginia Film Festival)
- Country: United States
- Language: English

A Tale of Two Cities: The Circuit City Story is a documentary produced, directed, and edited by Tom Wulf.

== Synopsis ==
The documentary chronicles the entire 60-year history of the Richmond-based retailer Circuit City. The documentary traces the defunct retailer from its humble beginnings as the family-owned Wards TV, to its rise to become the nation's largest specialty retailer of consumer electronics, to its downhill slide into bankruptcy and liquidation in 2009.

According to its website, the film "tells the tale of two "Cities:" one that went from good to great, and the other that went from great to gone."

== Release ==
The film made its world premiere at the Virginia Film Festival in November 2010.

== Reception ==
Professor Joseph Yamine reviewed the film for Virginia Libraries, praising the interviews and calling it a "nostalgic and heartfelt look at over fifty years of not only Circuit City history, but Virginia history as well." Writing for the Library Journal, Lawrence Maxted called A Tale of Two Cities a "fast-moving and entertaining postmortem of Circuit City" that is filled with "bonus sales stories and period commercials" and is "valuable case study fodder". Frank Swietek, an associate professor of history at the University of Dallas wrote in the Video Librarian that the film mixes "sympathy with a healthy dose of hardheaded analysis" and has "a wealth of archival material".
