= InterTAN =

International affiliate of Tandy Corporation

InterTAN Canada Ltd.
- Founded: 1986; 40 years ago
- Defunct: 2009
- Successor: The Source
- Headquarters: Barrie, Ontario, Canada
- Products: Consumer electronics
- Parent: Tandy Corporation
- Website: Archive of intertan.com

InterTAN Canada Ltd. was created by Tandy Corporation in 1986 to operate Radio Shack stores in Canada, Europe and Australia. After the UK locations, which were branded 'Tandy', were sold to Carphone Warehouse in 1999 and the Australian locations (which were also branded 'Tandy') to Woolworths in 2001, the company's primary asset was the RadioShack franchise for Canada. InterTAN's relationship with RadioShack was terminated in 2005, after InterTAN became a wholly owned subsidiary of Circuit City on May 19, 2004.

InterTAN Canada Ltd. was a Canadian consumer electronics retailer based in Barrie, Ontario, that operated stores under the banner "The Source by Circuit City" and a single "THS Studio" location. The Rogers Plus chain was previously operated by InterTAN on behalf of Rogers Communications; the chain is now managed directly by Rogers. As well, conversion or closure of all UpClose and G-Wiz stores, as well as all but one THS Studio, was completed in 2006.

InterTAN filed for bankruptcy protection (under the Companies' Creditors Arrangement Act) at the same time as its U.S. parent in late 2008. However, the Canadian division was not directly affected by Circuit City's liquidation process announced on January 16, 2009. Bell Canada subsequently announced an agreement to purchase the bulk of InterTAN's assets, specifically The Source.

InterTAN, the corporate entity, was not included in the sale (rather it was itself the seller); therefore, it is now considered defunct.

== History ==
InterTAN Inc. was a wholly owned subsidiary of Tandy Corporation of Fort Worth, Texas, which owned retail operations in the United Kingdom, Australia, France, Belgium, the Netherlands, West Germany, Canada and the United States. Its name being a shortened version of International Tandy. It had estimated annual sales of US$400 million and assets of US$250 million and accounted for 13 percent of the company's annual sales.

It was decided to "spin off" the international retail operations and a separate corporation, InterTAN Inc., was created. The company had two subsidiaries: InterTAN Canada Ltd. and InterTAN Australia Ltd.. The company became a separate entity from Tandy Corporation on 20 June 1986, with InterTAN Canada Ltd. to oversee 873 stores in Canada and 894 stores in Europe and InterTAN Australia Ltd. to oversee 350 stores in Australia.

By 1988, the company had closed unprofitable stores in many countries, including in West Germany.

The French stores were bankrupt by the end of December 1993, shut down along with the Belgian stores and distribution centre. Carphone Warehouse bought the remaining British shops in 1999, one year after InterTAN had closed 69 of the 338 UK Tandy stores.

In April 2001, InterTAN Australia Limited trading as Tandy Electronics was sold to Woolworths for A$112.6 million with 222 stores.

InterTAN was reduced to being the parent company for the Canadian consumer electronics business only. Product offerings occasionally differed from the US chain; a 1989 decision to drop the Tandy Colour Computer in Canada drew a small-scale backlash and InterTAN often carried non-RadioShack items alongside the core Tandy line.

Until June 30, 2005, InterTAN ran stores under the banner RadioShack in Canada, as it had a licensing agreement with the RadioShack Corporation until 2010 to use the American company's trademarks. However, after a purchase of InterTAN by Circuit City Stores, Inc. in 2004, the RadioShack Corporation sued to have that agreement terminated. While that lawsuit was approved in the State of Texas, it was not legally binding in Canada. InterTan filed a lawsuit in Canada stating that since the purchase by Circuit City Stores, Inc. was for only 80% of InterTAN, the latter was still a viable company and thus entitled to keep using the name RadioShack. InterTAN and RadioShack came to a temporary deal by which InterTAN is banned from using the former moniker since July 1, 2005, and as such, all corporate retail consumer electronics stores, and most dealer stores, formerly known as RadioShack are known as The Source. The matter was settled in late 2006; however, the details of the settlement were not made public. RadioShack made a token effort to re-enter the Canadian market in 2005 with nine stores, which it abandoned in January 2007. Remaining RadioShack-branded inventory began to appear in Liquidation World bins in Canada in 2007.

Former InterTAN CEO Brian Levy later became an ER medical doctor.

InterTAN had entered into arrangements with Rogers Communications to run a chain of stores under the Rogers Plus banner, using InterTAN's point-of-sale systems and knowledge of retail operations for the day-to-day management of the stores. This partnership was renewed as part of the Circuit City acquisition, and was set to expire in January 2007.

In April 2002, InterTAN, already one of Canada's largest battery retailers with its RadioShack stores, acquired certain assets and locations of Battery Plus and merged it into its retail operations.

In the first two months of 2007, InterTAN underwent drastic changes. By closing all but one THS Studio location, as well as all but one Battery Plus location, InterTAN began to focus on its core operation: The Source By Circuit City. InterTAN continued closing underperforming locations through the end of February 2007, resulting in the loss of employment for almost 100 Canadians. The positions varied from sales associates, store managers, store assistant managers, district managers, service centre managers, even regional vice presidents.

Circuit City announced that they had retained Goldman Sachs to explore selling off InterTAN in Q1, 2007. Circuit City USA went bankrupt in 2009, during the Great Recession. "The Source" was sold as a going concern to Bell Canada Enterprises.

== See also ==
- Tandy Corporation
- RadioShack (U.S.)
- Circuit City
