= Scott Waxman =

- Occupation: Publisher
- Title: Founder of Waxman Literary Agency; CEO of Diversion Books
- Website: Waxman Literary Agency; Diversion Books

Scott Waxman is the founder of both the Waxman Literary Agency and Diversion Books.

== Career ==
After graduating college, Waxman worked for HarperCollins as an editor in the early 1990s. In 1997, Waxman founded the Waxman Literary Agency. In 2012 Byrd Leavell joined the agency as a named partner, staying with the Waxman Leavell agency until September 2017 when he left for UTA and the agency reverted to its original name.

In 1999, Waxman founded LiveREADS, a company that produced enhanced eBooks of works from Jack Kerouac and other authors. The company went out of business. Waxman noted that if ePublishing ever did become popular, he wanted to be ready.

In 2010, Waxman founded Diversion Books, a publishing company which specializes in commercial fiction, sports, health, and business titles. Diversion publishes both original and backlist titles, most notably Mike Leach's book, Swing Your Sword: Leading the Charge in Football and in Life and How to Win at the Sport of Business: If I Can Do It, You Can Do It by Dallas Mavericks owner Mark Cuban.
