= James Tandy (public servant) =

Australian scholar

James Tandy MBE (13 January 1918 – 10 April 1997) was an Australian public servant who became Commonwealth Director of Aboriginal Education.

== Early life ==
Tandy was born at Muswellbrook, New South Wales and attended Newington College (1932-1933). He began his working career in the banking industry.

== Army service ==
He joined the army in 1940 and saw action with the 2/1 AA in the Middle East and in the bombing attacks on Darwin, Northern Territory. He reached the rank of staff sergeant and was discharged in 1946. After the war he married Beatrix Kroening.

== Public service ==
He joined the Commonwealth Public Service and studied at the University of Sydney at night. He gained a BA degree and an Education Diploma. In 1967 he joined the Education and Science Department and in the following years toured many Aboriginal settlements in northern Australia. As Commonwealth Director of Aboriginal Education he introduced a bi-lingual educational program for Northern Territory Aboriginal students, which meant the formal recognition of Indigenous Australian languages and cultures.

== Honours ==
Tandy Close in Bruce, Australian Capital Territory, is named in his honour. He was made a Member of the Order of the British Empire in 1977 in recognition of his services to Aboriginal languages and culture. He died in Hervey Bay, Queensland.
