= Les Ailes de la Mode =

Canadian department store chain

Les Ailes de la Mode Inc.

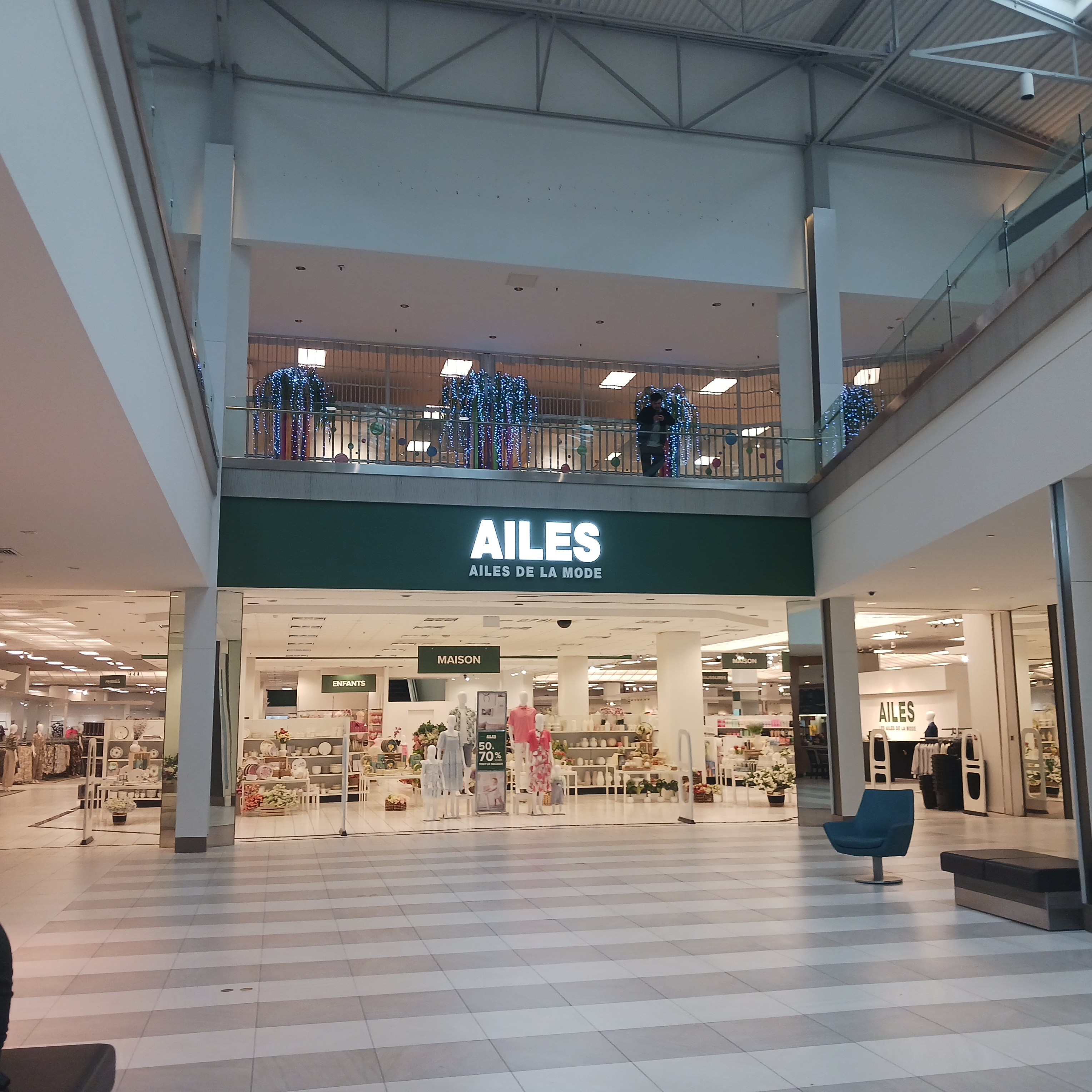
- Les Ailes de la Mode store at Promenades Saint-Bruno
- Industry: Retail
- Genre: Department stores
- Founded: August 1994; 32 years ago in Brossard, Quebec, Canada
- Founder: Paul Delage-Roberge
- Headquarters: Montreal, Canada
- Number of locations: 2 (2026)
- Area served: Greater Montreal
- Parent: Fairweather Group
- Divisions: Zellers

Les Ailes de la Mode is a Canadian department store. Originating in Brossard in 1994, it expanded to over five locations around Canada including a flagship at Montreal Eaton Centre. Initially a high-end chain of the now-defunct San Francisco Group from Boucherville, Quebec, it was acquired by Fairweather in 2005.

In 2017, the chain closed its last traditional store but continued operating a handful of clothing boutiques with the Les Ailes de la Mode nameplate. In May 2026, a full-line branch opened at Promenades Saint-Bruno in suburban Montreal, while the boutiques removed the name from their stores early on.

== History ==
=== Founding and early growth ===
Les Ailes de la Mode was founded by Paul Delage Roberge as a division of his San Francisco women's clothing chain. The name Les Ailes de la Mode derived from a magazine of the same name that was founded in 1988 also by Paul Delage Roberge.

Les Ailes de la Mode opened its first store in 1994 at Mail Champlain in Brossard, Quebec. At the time, the two-storey location featured a pianist who would play throughout the store, a restaurant, a coffee shop named Brulerie-les-Ailes, and a talking bear in the children's section. The popularity of Les Ailes de la Mode inspired an IMAX theatre which was opening at the same mall in 1996 to call itself Imax Les Ailes.

Les Ailes de la Mode established an image as an upscale department store selling high-end apparel and cosmetic brands, including Hugo Boss, Versace, G-Star, Dolce & Gabbana, Tommy Hilfiger, Armani, Nautica, Polo Ralph Lauren, DKNY, Diesel, Jones New York, Calvin Klein, Guess, Lancôme, and Chanel.

In 1996, Les Ailes de la Mode opened a 60,000-square-foot (5,600 m^{2}) store at Carrefour Laval, in a space which occupied a Pascal hardware store five years before.

The third Les Ailes de la Mode store opened in 1997 at Place Sainte-Foy in Sainte-Foy, Quebec. As with the Brossard store, it had a Brulerie-les-Ailes as well as a Côté Jardin restaurant in the mezzanine. In this particular store, there was a small play area for kids.

In 2001, Les Ailes de la Mode opened its fourth store in Bayshore Shopping Centre in Nepean, Ontario.

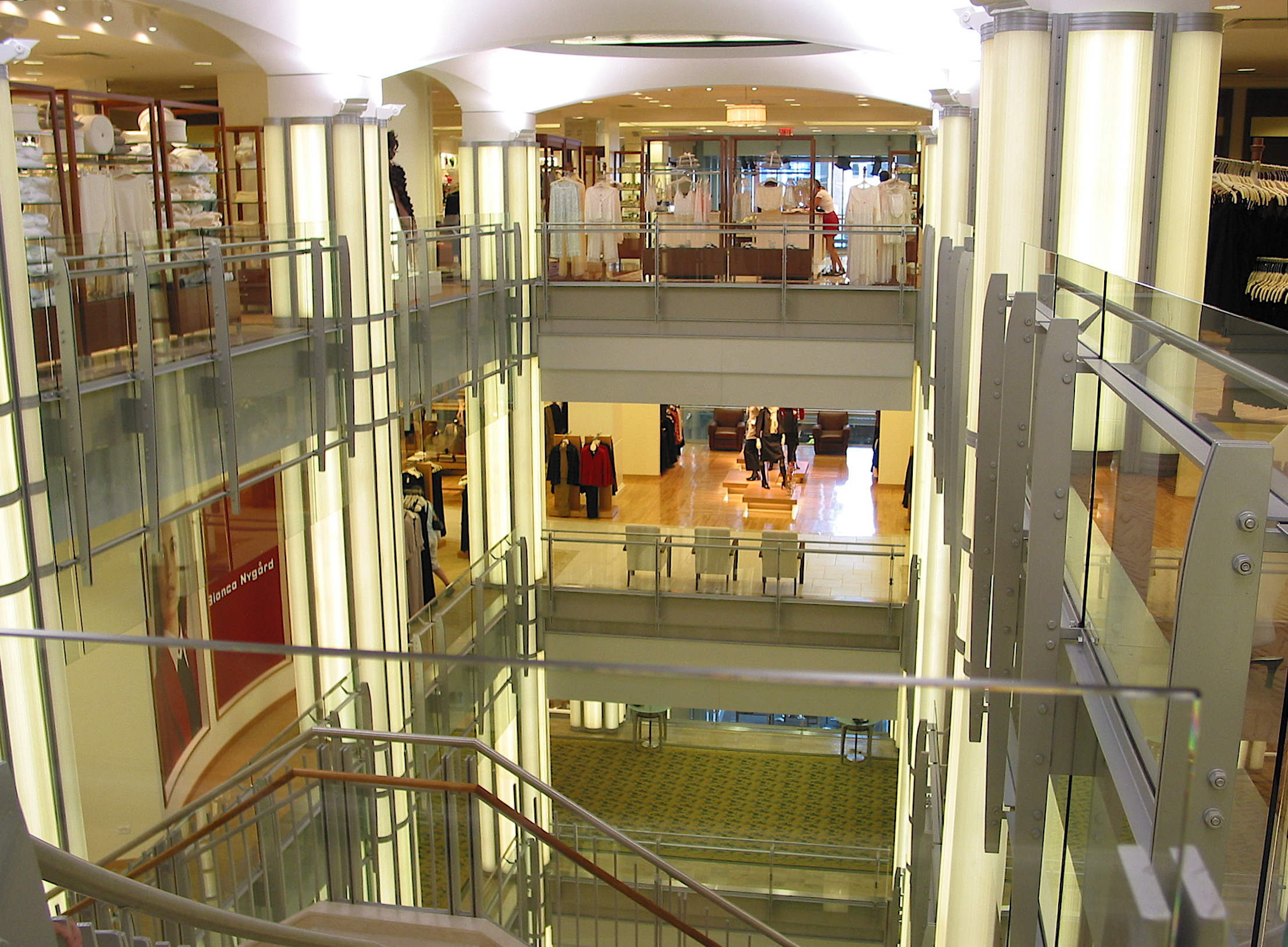
Interior of the flagship store at Complexe Les Ailes in Montreal (2002)

The long-awaited downtown Montreal flagship store of Les Ailes de la Mode opened on August 7, 2002, in the former space of Eaton's department store which had been converted into a new shopping mall called Complexe Les Ailes and named after Les Ailes de la Mode. Upon its opening, the 223,000-square-foot (20,700 m^{2}), four-floor flagship store included a karaoke (where Musique Plus broadcast its television program Karaoclip), an art gallery, a wedding registry service, a shoe waxing service, a vodka bar, many breast-feeding rooms, a carousel and amusements in the children's section as well as many other attractions. The store also featured four restaurants: 1) Kouros Bar, a bar selling exclusively vodka 2) Kouros Tea Room, a tea bar 3) Stto Shushi Bar and 4) Kouros Restaurant, which offered tapas and Mediterranean snacks. The downtown store employed 1,000 people.

Throughout the 1990s and early 2000s, Les Ailes de la Mode was at its peak. In 1998, its stock was worth $54 per share. The company had its own foundation, la fondation Les Ailes, which raised funds for the health and education sectors. It participated in charity events and annually held a prize home lottery called La maison de rêve Les Ailes. The foundation raised $1,600,000 in 2002 for many established organizations. Shoe waxing, wedding registering and many other services were offered in Les Ailes de la Mode stores. During December each year, the stores designate a portion of their floorspace as a Christmas section where children met Santa Claus in his kingdom.

=== Decline ===
Les Ailes de la Mode's problems began in 2003 as a direct result of the openings of the Bayshore and Montreal stores. The company's quick expansion was more than it could afford. The downtown Montreal store was particularly too large for what the market could handle, and it saddled the company with debt that forced it into bankruptcy.

The Bayshore store was closed down in 2003, less than two years after its opening. In January 2004, the size of the downtown Montreal store was reduced to 76,764 square feet (7,131.6 m^{2}) across two floors: roughly a third of its former size. Despite these drastic measures, however, Les Ailes de la Mode never recovered from the troubles initiated by these two stores.

Meanwhile, these troubles began to be reflected across the chain. La fondation Les Ailes and its programs were terminated. Plans to open new stores in Fairview Pointe-Claire, Marché Central and Lac-Mirabel and expand in Toronto, Vancouver and the United States were scrapped.

Les Ailes de la Mode's underperformance drove the entire San Francisco Group into bankruptcy in December 2003. After exiting bankruptcy in July 2004, the San Francisco Group was renamed Groupe Les Ailes de la Mode, with Les Ailes de la Mode being one of its just two remaining divisions (the other being Bikini Village).

=== Change of direction ===
In August 2005, Groupe Les Ailes de la Mode sold Les Ailes de la Mode to Fairweather Group (currently named Fairweather I.N.C Group), who heavily modified the concept of Les Ailes de la Mode from an upscale department store to a discount store.

Les Ailes de la Mode magazine ceased publication and was discontinued. Les Ailes de la Mode stopped selling prestigious apparel and cosmetic brands, including Hugo Boss, Versace, G-Star, Dolce & Gabbana, Tommy Hilfiger, Armani, Nautica, Polo Ralph Lauren, DKNY, Diesel, Jones New York, Calvin Klein, Guess, Lancôme, and Chanel. Instead, Les Ailes de la Mode sold discount merchandise from the various store banners and in-house brands of parent company Fairweather I.N.C Group, including International Concepts, International Clothiers, Stockhomme, Pinstripe, Fairweather, and Randy River. These brands, largely unknown to Quebec consumers due to the absence of several of these store banners in the province, rendered Les Ailes de la Mode stores as outlets for all merchandise of Fairweather I.N.C Group.

In-store restaurants and beauty salons were all shut down, and the stores no longer sold cosmetics and pianos. Most checkout and fitting rooms were closed, leaving several of Les Ailes de la Mode's shuttered sections unoccupied. The size of the downtown Montreal store reduced so drastically that it began using the mall corridor, Complexe Les Ailes, to display and sell merchandise. Les Ailes de la Mode's return policy became restricted to exchanges only for items on regular price, with no returns at all for items on sales.

=== Final years as a department store ===
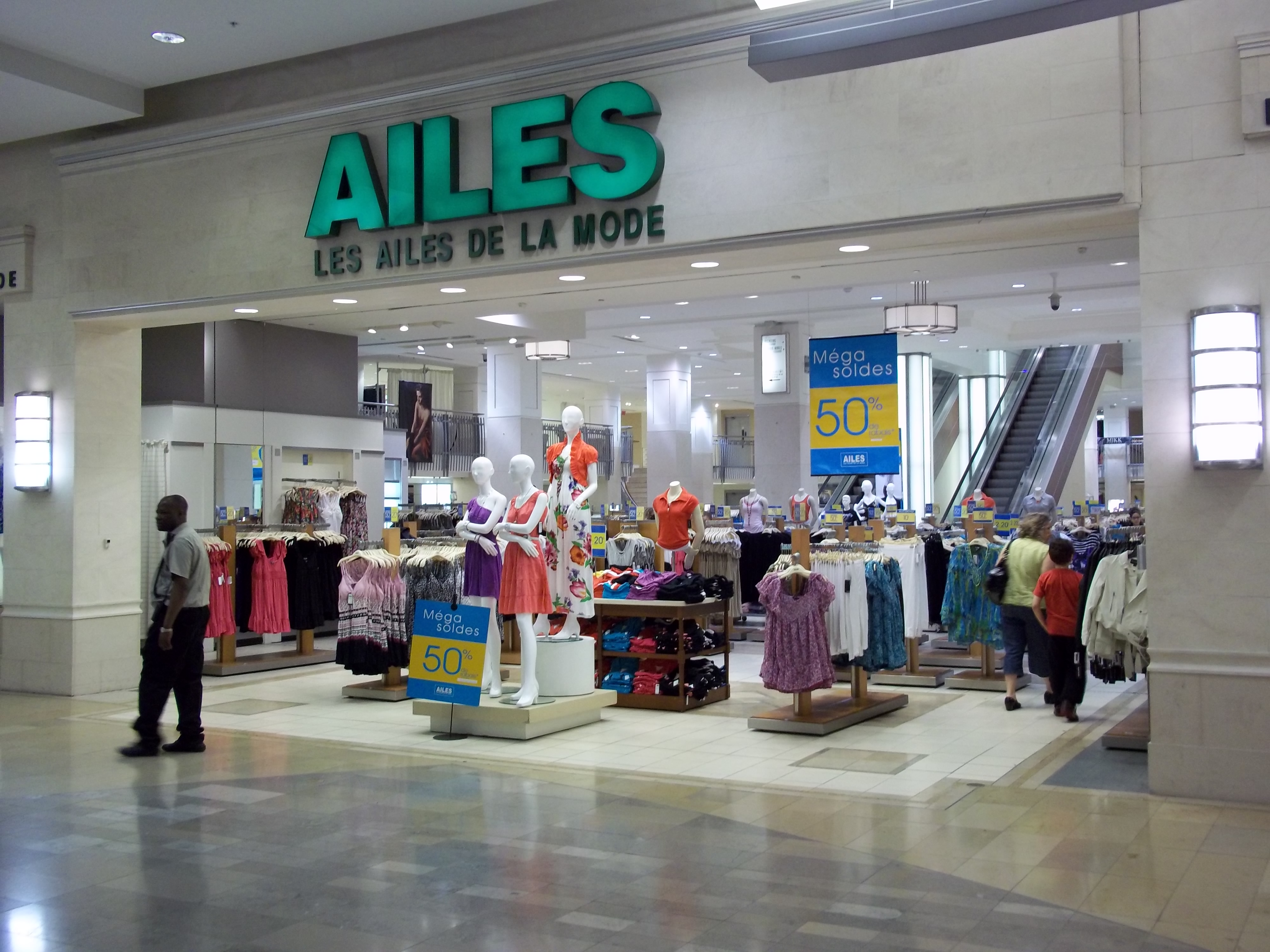
Montreal store in 2011

The management of Carrefour Laval, unsatisfied with Les Ailes de la Mode's new identity and lack of cachet, decided not to renew the store lease upon expiry in February 2011. The management of Complexe Les Ailes had also questioned the future of the store in their mall for similar reasons.

The closure of the Place Ste-Foy store was announced in March 2014 and completed on February 25, 2015.

The Ailes de la Mode at Complexe Les Ailes closed in early 2016. Most of the remaining locations (Drummondville and Chateauguay) unceremoniously closed throughout the rest of the year.

The Brossard location closed in 2017, effectively ending the last piece of the 23-year-old retailer as a major department store chain. Les Ailes de la Mode has nonetheless continued operating on more modest spaces in a handful of Quebec shopping malls.

=== Revival ===
In 2025, Fairweather I.N.C. entered into negotiation to secure a former Hudson's Bay leasehold with the intention of opening a new Les Ailes de la Mode location.

In August 2025, it was revealed that the owner of Fairweather and International Clothiers had acquired the intellectual properties of Zellers and will open a new store with that name in the space of a former Hudson's Bay location in Edmonton. A trademark filling indicated that the Hudson's Bay Company transferred the Zellers brand to Les Ailes de la Mode on August 6, 2025.

In October 2025, RioCan REIT announced that Fairweather I.N.C was intending to open a Les Ailes de la Mode store in the former Hudson's Bay location at Toronto's Yorkdale Centre. Oxford Properties, the mall's owner, took legal action to block the Hudson's Bay lease transfer to Fairweather. In February 2026, the lease transfer was successfully blocked.

In January 2026, it was revealed that Les Ailes de la Mode had finalized arrangements for two stores in ex-Hudson's Bay locations in Quebec, both in shopping malls belonging to Primaris REIT, the owner of Galeries de la Capitale and Promenades Saint-Bruno. The few small Les Ailes de la Mode stores that were still carrying the name, at Place Vertu and Decarie Square, had already removed the signage from their storefronts in preparation for the revival and are planned to rebranded to other Fairweather nameplates. In May 2026, the first new branch was opened at CF Promenades Saint-Bruno. In October 2026, a second branch opened at Galeries de la Capitalei in Quebec City.

== Warehouses ==
In addition to the aforementioned department stores, Les Ailes de la Mode had warehouses at Le Faubourg de l'Île in Pincourt, Les Galeries de la Canardière in Quebec City, Place Fleurs de Lys in Quebec City, Centre Les Rivières in Trois-Rivières and Place du Royaume in Chicoutimi.

== Les Ailes de la Mode Xpress ==
The Les Ailes de la Mode Xpress chain was a smaller version of Les Ailes de la Mode. It consisted of 9 boutiques, 2 of which are still open.

Les Ailes de la Mode Xpress was a unisex retailer, and all of its goods were also sold in large Les Ailes de la Mode stores. Les Ailes de La Mode Xpress shared the same logo as Les Ailes de la Mode department stores, with the addition of the term Xpress underneath. The shopping bags at the Xpress stores were the same as those at the department store.

Fairweather I.N.C. Group launched the "Les Ailes de la Mode Xpress" sub-banner by renaming its GLAM chain. GLAM was an acronym for Groupe Les Ailes de la Mode, the former parent company name of Les Ailes de la Mode, despite being operated by Fairweather. Before the rebranding of GLAM to Les Ailes Xpress, the chain was also named I&F. In 2012, the Xpress stores were rebranded under the "La Compagnie INC Fairweather" brand, except for two stores and later two more mall stores opened.

== External link ==
- Official website (archives)
