= Fleur de Lys centre commercial =

Shopping mall in Quebec City, Quebec, Canada

- Coordinates: 46°49′21″N 71°15′07″W
- Address: 552, boulevard Wilfrid-Hamel; Quebec City, Quebec; G1M 3E5
- Opened: March 21, 1963
- Manager: Trudel Immeubles
- Num. of stores: 150
- Num. of anchor tenants: 2
- Floor area: 857,571 square feet (79,671.0 m^{2})
- Floors: 1
- Parking: 4410
- Website: www.fdlcentrecommercial.com (in French)

Fleur de Lys centre commercial (formerly and still commonly called Place Fleur de Lys) is a shopping mall located in the Vanier borough of Quebec City, Quebec, Canada built in 1963. It is located across from L'Institut de réadaptation en déficience physique de Québec and close to the Videotron Centre. It is anchored by Walmart and Maxi. The mall is access by Quebec Autoroute 973 and Quebec Route 138 via boulevard Wilfrid-Hamel.

== History ==
Place Fleur de Lys opened on March 21, 1963, with anchors Simpsons-Sears (Sears), Steinberg and Zellers. Place Fleurs de Lys is notable for having the first ever Sears department store in the province of Quebec. This two level 140,000 square foot anchor space was the first French-speaking department store from the Toronto-based Simpsons-Sears Ltd.

On October 17, 1968, S.S. Kresge Co Ltée opened a Kmart store. As with Sears five years earlier, the Kmart at Place Fleurs de Lys was the first in the province.

In March 1980, Place Fleur de Lys expanded from 650 000 square feet to 850 000 to reach 170 stores including a new Pascal hardware store. After Pascal closed, its former space of 75 000 square feet was converted into another mall expansion of 145 000 square feet anchored by a single level The Bay store which opened on October 7, 1992.

Kmart closed on May 31, 1995, and the Zellers in the mall relocated in its space. Target acquired the lease of Zellers and opened a store at Fleur de Lys on October 18, 2013, as part of the retailer's second wave of openings in Quebec. On May 8, 2015, Walmart bought the lease of the former Target store.

Primaris REIT completed its acquisition of Fleurs de Lys on July 20, 2005. The mall was later managed by 20 VIC Management. On August 15, 2017, Cushman & Wakefield announced it would acquire 20 VIC Management and the transaction was completed the following month in September, bringing Fleurs de Lys to its portfolio.

Sears lasted until the end of the chain on January 14, 2018.

In July 2018, the Fleurs de Lys shopping mall was purchased by Trudel Alliance from KingSett Capital for $60 million. The acquisition happened in a time when the shopping mall had to deal with large vacant anchor spaces left by the departures of both Sears and Hudson's Bay. The new owners have since began the process of redeveloping the mall. The UQTR set up a campus for 6,000 students in the former Sears store. Hart also opened a store within the former Sears building. Hudson's Bay was replaced by Jysk, Dollarama and another local business. An entire section of the mall was razed between the Sports Experts store and the former Sears building in 2021–2022. Trudel has announced that it plans to build several residential towers on the site of the shopping mall, with one of the buildings already in construction as of 2023.

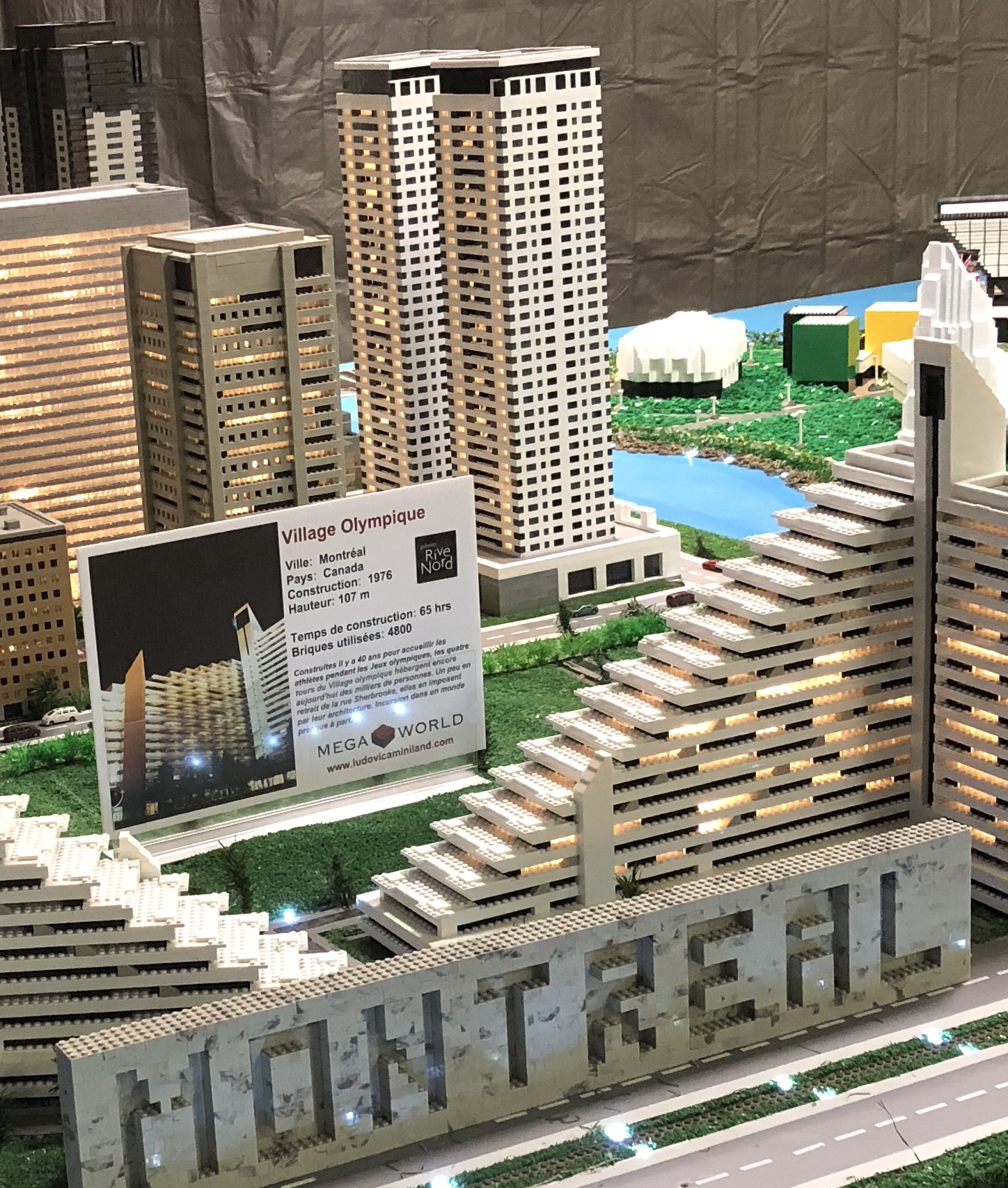
LUDOVICA Miniland mini blocks exhibition piece at Fleur de Lys centre commercial, in 2018, depicting Montreal′s Olympic Village

== See also ==
- List of largest enclosed shopping malls in Canada

Other malls in Quebec City area:

- Galeries de la Capitale
- Laurier Québec
- Place Sainte-Foy
