= Laurier Québec =

Shopping mall in Quebec City, Quebec, Canada

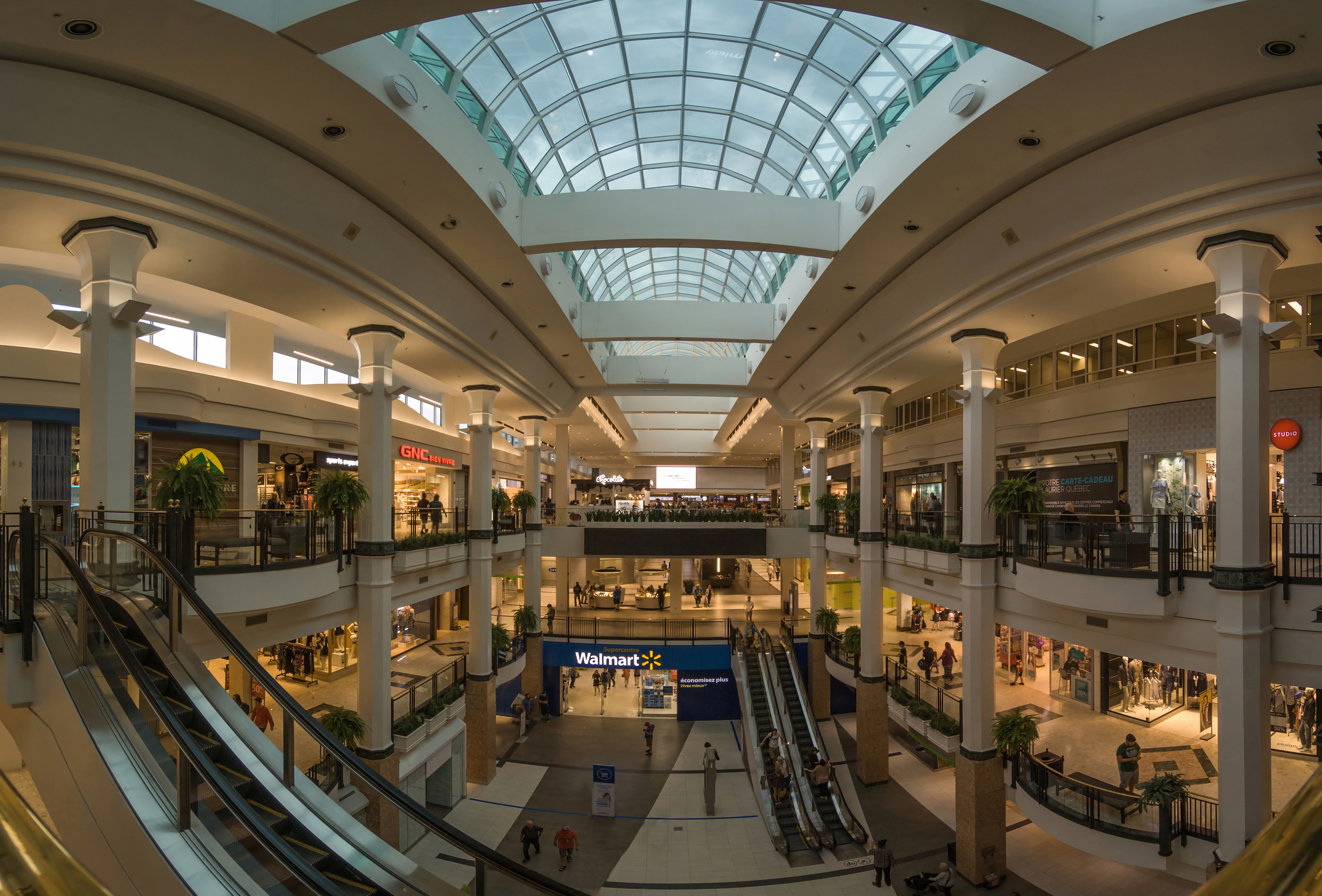
- Coordinates: 46.77°N 71.285°W
- Address: 2700, boulevard Laurier; Quebec City, Quebec; G1V 2L8
- Opened: November 11, 1961
- Developer: Immeubles Delrano Inc.
- Manager: JLL
- Owner: La Caisse (50%), DMA (50%)
- Num. of stores: 217
- Num. of anchor tenants: 5
- Floor area: 1,174,639 sq ft (109,127.5 m^{2})
- Floors: 3
- Website: www.laurierquebec.com/en

Laurier Québec (formerly called and still commonly referred to as Place Laurier) is one of Canada's largest shopping malls. It is located in Quebec City, Quebec (in what was formerly the city of Sainte-Foy).

Laurier Québec has approximately 215 stores and restaurants and is built on three levels with underground, multilevel, and outdoor parking. Major tenants include Sports Experts/Atmosphere, Best Buy, Marshalls and Walmart. Laurier Québec is home to the biggest Sports Experts store. Other tenants include jewellery, gift, shoe, book, eyeware, music, toy, electronics, clothing, hardware, and pet stores as well as hair and beauty salons.

An indoor mall since its opening in 1961, Laurier Québec is the first enclosed shopping centre in the province. The mall had the particularity of having two Dominion supermarkets at the same time in the 1960s and two simultaneous Zellers stores in the 1990s.

== History ==
=== 1960s ===
Place Laurier opened on November 11, 1961, as a two-level mall with 50 stores including anchors Pascal's, Syndicat, Kresge's, Towers and Dominion. An office building with eight floors known as Tour Frontenac later inaugurated also in 1961. A Paquet store soon joined the mall as well.

In that same decade, an expansion occurred in the western part of the shopping centre when a new mall wing of three floors was built on Towers' original anchor space. The first floor of this expansion constituted of the relocated Towers store, a second Dominion supermarket, and a Marquis de Montcalm restaurant. The second floor was reserved for a relocated Syndicat, the first level of a new Norman store as well as a branch of the Bank of Montreal. The third floor was mostly for the second level of Norman. In total, 403,000 square feet was added during that western expansion of three floors. In the eastern side of the mall, Pascal's increased its size by 30% by absorbing Paquet's original location. The latter moved in a brand new two-level building of 131,980 square feet in the shopping mall.

=== 1970s ===
An expansion to the north welcomed a two-level Sears store and a new mall section of 48 shops spread on three floors. Sears opened in October 1971 under its then-name of Simpsons-Sears and was its second store in the Quebec City area and its 40th chainwide. The rest of the northern section inaugurated in 1972.

In 1976, Marathon Realty, the real-estate of Canadian Pacific, purchased for $40 million Place Laurier from Les Immeubles Delrano.

=== 1980s ===
Paquet and Syndicat, which were of the same owner, both declared bankruptcy in 1981. A 80,920 square feet single-level Zellers opened in 1982 in one of the two floors of the closed Paquet store. As for Syndicat's vacant space, it was eventually subdivided by anchors Toyville and Wise, a General Motors car dealership and some 10 stores.

Also in 1982, an expansion to the south installed a two-level The Bay store. 65 stores were also added in two new mall wings which both linked The Bay to the existing the shopping centre. One of the new wings is located to the south east of the mall and is single level, while the other wing is slightly to the south west and is spread on two floors. Both aforementioned wings are easily recognizable today in the second and third floors of the shopping mall although The Bay store that was located between them has since closed and its former space is currently sitting vacant. The 1982 expansion brought 130,000 square feet of retail space to The Bay alone and another 129,534 to the other stores.

At this point, Place Laurier had undergone nine expansions between 1961 and 1986.

=== 1990s ===
Zellers converted Bonimart into its nameplate in 1991 resulting in Place Laurier having two department stores with the same name.

In 1994, Marathon sold half of its stake in Place Laurier to OMERS Realty Corp, the real estate investment arm of Ontario's municipal employees' pension fund. The manager of Place Laurier changed to Oxford Properties on October 2, 1996, due to the acquisition of Marathon by Olympiad Acquisitions, a company jointly owned by Oxford and GE Capital.

In the summer of 1996, the Zellers on the east side of the mall closed and was replaced by shops, while the other Zellers store on the west end was enlarged to reach 135,000 square feet. In parallel to this, The Bay expanded by adding more than 25,000 square feet to its store.

=== 2000s ===
Ivanhoe, the real estate arm of the Caisse de depot et placement du Quebec became the manager of Place Laurier in May 2000 and also acquired the 50% stake that was owned by Oxford. Ivanhoe merged in 2001 with Cambridge Shopping Centres to become Ivanhoé Cambridge.

Sears unveiled a new look on October 7, 2004. In addition to the renovation, 8,000 square feet were added to the store which now reached a total of 122,000 square feet.

In April 2007, the shopping centre was renamed from Place Laurier to Laurier Québec.

=== 2010s ===
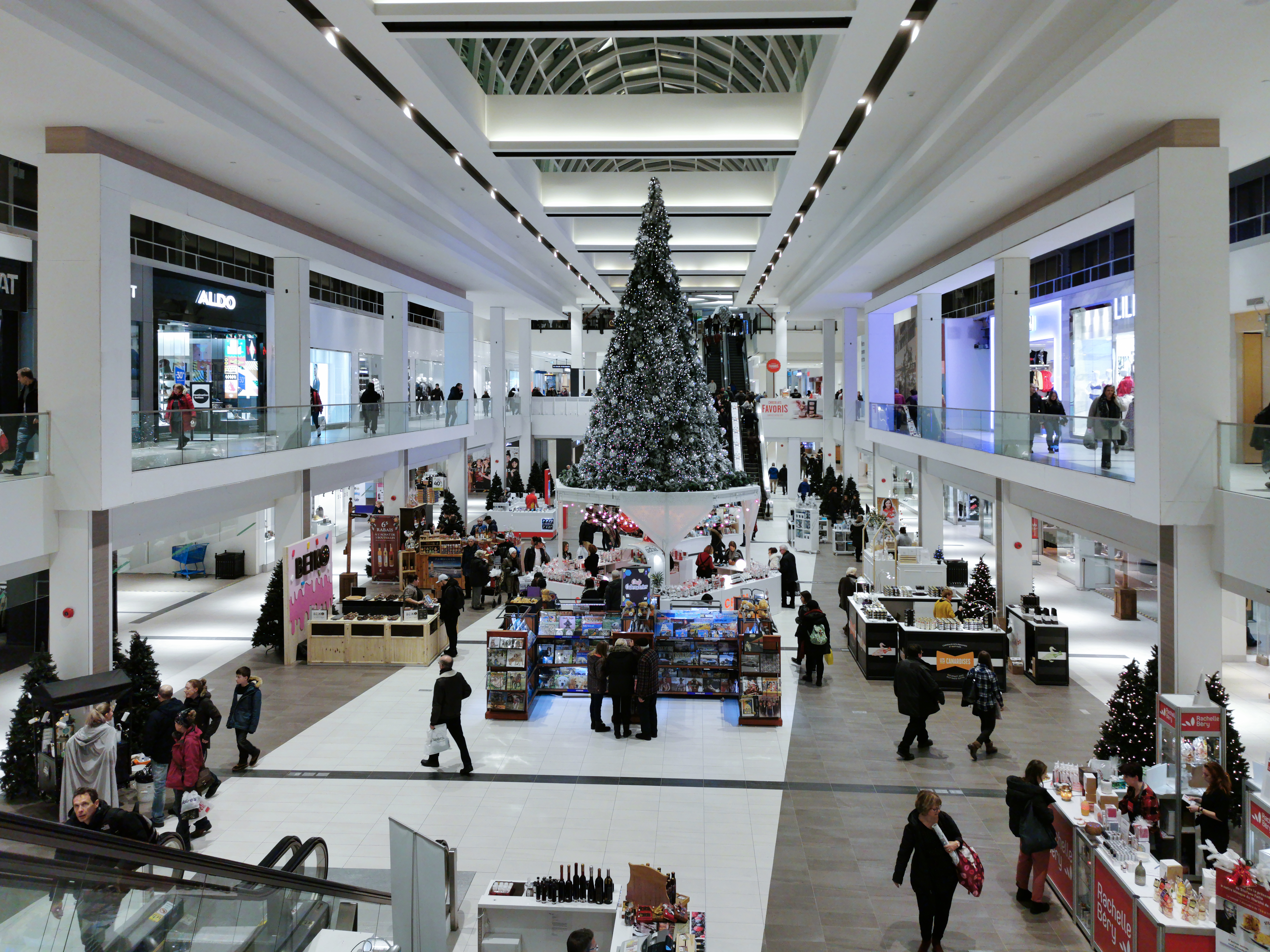
Mall after renovation in 2019

In June 2010, Ivanhoé Cambridge purchased the 50% interest by OMERS in the property to hold 100% of the ownership.

Another expansion welcomed Best Buy opened in September 2011, the same time as the retailer's other location at Galeries de la Capitale. In the case of the Laurier Québec store, there was an autograph signings by former hockey players Guy Lafleur and Alain Côté as well as a free concert from singer Marie-Mai.

The Zellers store that was left in the mall eventually closed and was converted into a Target Canada on October 18, 2013. Following Target's exit, Walmart Canada acquired the lease and opened its supercenter in 2016.

Marshalls inaugurated on August 25, 2016, in the space vacated by Future Shop.

Sears closed with the rest of the chain on January 14, 2018.

=== 2020s ===
In late 2021, Sports Experts opened in Sears's former space at close 84,000 square foot over two floors making it the largest store of that retail chain. The inauguration was the biggest in terms of traffic and volume in the history of not only Sports Experts but also of Sport Chek.

The two-level 157,000 square foot The Bay store, that was added during the mall's expansion in the early 1980s, closed on September 11, 2022. Like most locations of that retailer, the name on its storefront had been modified from The Bay to Hudson's Bay during the 2010s but it still lacked the renovation that another outlet in nearly Galeries de la Capitale had received. The site will be redeveloped to include residential buildings. The shopping centre itself will triple its size from 1.3 to 3.5 million square feet. Ivanhoé Cambridge will join force with the Quebec group Douville, Moffet et Associés which also bought 50% of the shopping center to carry out the project over 10 years.

== Major tenants ==
- Aliments de Santé Laurier (15,728 sq ft (1,461.2 m^{2}))
- Best Buy
- Walmart Canada
- Marshalls
- Sunrise Records (retailer) (16,444 sq ft (1,527.7 m^{2}))
- Linen Chest (28,793 sq ft (2,675.0 m^{2}))
- Old Navy (15,990 sq ft (1,486 m^{2}))
- Renaud-Bray (19,869 sq ft (1,845.9 m^{2}))
- Sports Experts (83,500 sq ft (7,760 m^{2}))

== See also ==
- List of largest enclosed shopping malls in Canada
- List of shopping malls in Canada
- Galeries de la Capitale
- Fleur de Lys centre commercial
- Place Sainte-Foy
