= Galeries de la Capitale =

Shopping mall in Quebec City, Quebec, Canada

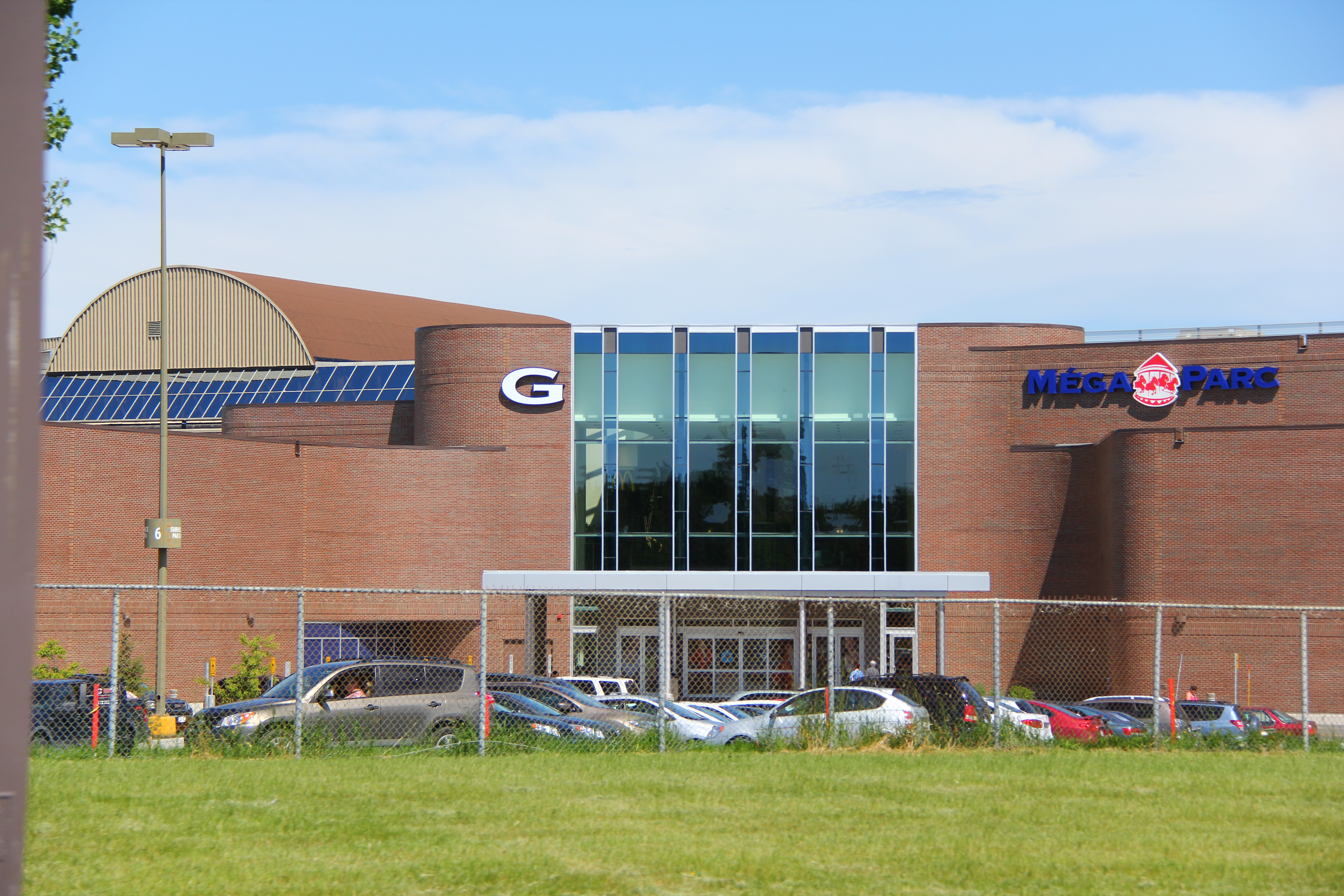
- Coordinates: 46°49′48″N 71°18′0″W
- Address: 5401, boulevard des Galeries; Quebec City, Quebec; G2K 1N4
- Opened: August 19, 1981
- Developer: Développements Iberville
- Manager: Primaris REIT
- Owner: Primaris REIT
- Num. of stores: 280
- Num. of anchor tenants: 7
- Floor area: 1,348,381 sq ft (125,268.7 m^{2})
- Floors: 2
- Website: www.galeriesdelacapitale.com/en/

Galeries de la Capitale is a shopping mall located in the Les Rivières borough in Quebec City, Quebec, Canada.

Galeries de la Capitale has 280 stores and 35 restaurants. The anchors are Hudson's Bay, Simons, Atmosphère/Sports Experts, IMAX, and Best Buy. There is also a Rona l'Entrepôt in the parking lot.

The mall is famous for its indoor amusement park, the Mega-Parc, with 18 attractions and amusement rides including the first spokeless Ferris wheel in America. The Mega Parc attracts 420 000 visitors annually, 20% of which are tourists. Galeries de la Capitale's IMAX theatre has the largest screen in Canada and is also the only IMAX in Quebec City.

With its 1,348,381 square feet (125,268.7 m^{2}), Galeries de la Capitale is the largest shopping mall in Quebec City, the second in the province after Carrefour Laval and the ninth in Canada. It also has one of the highest sales per square foot among the province's shopping malls.

== History ==
Galeries de la Capitale was the idea of businessman Marcel Adams. The mall was inaugurated in August 1981 in a deserted part. At the time the mall was owned at 50% by Les Développements Iberville (the real estate company of Marcel Adams), at 25% by Eaton Properties (the real estate company of Eaton's), and at 25% by Markborough Properties (the real estate company of the Hudson's Bay Company). Upon its opening of 190 stores, the anchors were Eaton's, The Bay, Provigo, Cooprix, Simons which were joined in the fall of the same year by Woolco.

1988 saw the opening of the indoor amusement park Méga-Parc, the second largest of its kind in Canada after West Edmonton Mall. The park, composed of 20 amusement rides, included a Ferris wheel, some roller coasters and a skating rink for ice hockey games.

In 1994, Woolco was converted to Wal-Mart as part of the American parent company's entrance to Canada with the official inauguration of that location being celebrated on November 22 although the store had already been opened to the public for many months. In early 2002, Wal-Mart left Galeries de la Capitale to move on the nearby parking, allowing its former space in the mall to be replaced on July 13 of the same year by rival Zellers, itself relocating from a previous address in the Neufchâtel neighborhood.

When Eaton's was downsizing in 1997, the location at Galeries de la Capitale was among the 31 stores nationwide the company had considered closing down in the same vein as other Quebec outlets at Carrefour Angrignon, Cavendish Mall, Beloeil and Gatineau. But unlike these aforementioned stores, the one at Galeries de la Capitale ended up staying opened. Two years later in 1999, Eaton's as a whole went bankrupt and its store at Galeries de la Capitale was the sole location in the province that Sears Canada had acquired. The store was converted into the Sears banner without ever closing down.

The mall was sold on December 1, 2005, for $358 million to a consortium consisting of Canada Pension Plan (80%); Osmington, an investment firm in Toronto (10%); and Westerkirk, a Toronto real estate firm (10%). Redcliff Realty Management was hired to manage the mall. In June 2013, Oxford Properties and Canada Pension Plan each acquired 50% of Galeries de la Capitale and the former took on the management duties of the shopping mall. On October 1st, 2024 Primaris REIT acquired les Galeries de la Capitale for $325 million.

In Spring 2011, Galeries de la Capitale opened a new section of the mall. The new section was added between the upper level McDonald's and the IMAX theatre. The new section included Best Buy's first Quebec City location, a Sports Experts store, and a new Toys "R" Us (the latter opening before the others in November 2010). The opening of Best Buy was celebrated with a free concert inside the store by the band Simple Plan on September 19, 2011.

Zellers closed and was replaced by Target on November 13, 2013. Target closed in 2015 and Simons doubled its size to 80,000 square feet by relocating to that location in March 2018 and the rest of the vacant space was subdivided by nine smaller retailers.

In 2016, The Bay received a major facelift and new retailers such as Urban Planet, Sephora, Old Navy, Browns Shoes and the only Mountain Equipment Company store in Quebec City opened. Dollarama returned to the mall and the food court was relocated to the second floor next to the Méga-Parc.

In 2017, Sears Canada announced they would be closing all their remaining stores. This included the store at Galeries de la Capitale.

After almost 30 years in operation, the Méga-Parc closed in September 2017 to undergo major renovations. It reopened on January 18, 2019, with 18 amusement rides; 14 of which are new. The amusement park now host a Steampunk theme. The four returning rides were renovated to fit the new theme; they are the Force G gravity ride, the Condor plane ride, the Carrousel, and the Électro roller coaster. Particular to the new Méga-Parc is Zénith, the first Ferris wheel in the continent without spokes. Another new attraction is Patinarium, an ice skating circuit that surrounds the theme park and is the longest trail of this kind in Canada. The ice skating is lit with LED lights, allowing it to change colours.

In 2023, Zellers made a comeback to Galeries de la Capitale this time as a small department within the Hudson's Bay store of the same shopping mall.

Toys "R" Us (and sister store Babies "R" Us) closed its doors at the mall on January 5, 2026, marking the end of the chain in Quebec City.

== See also ==
- List of largest enclosed shopping malls in Canada
- Fleur de Lys centre commercial
- Laurier Québec
- Place Sainte-Foy
