= Place Sainte-Foy =

Shopping mall in Quebec City, Quebec, Canada

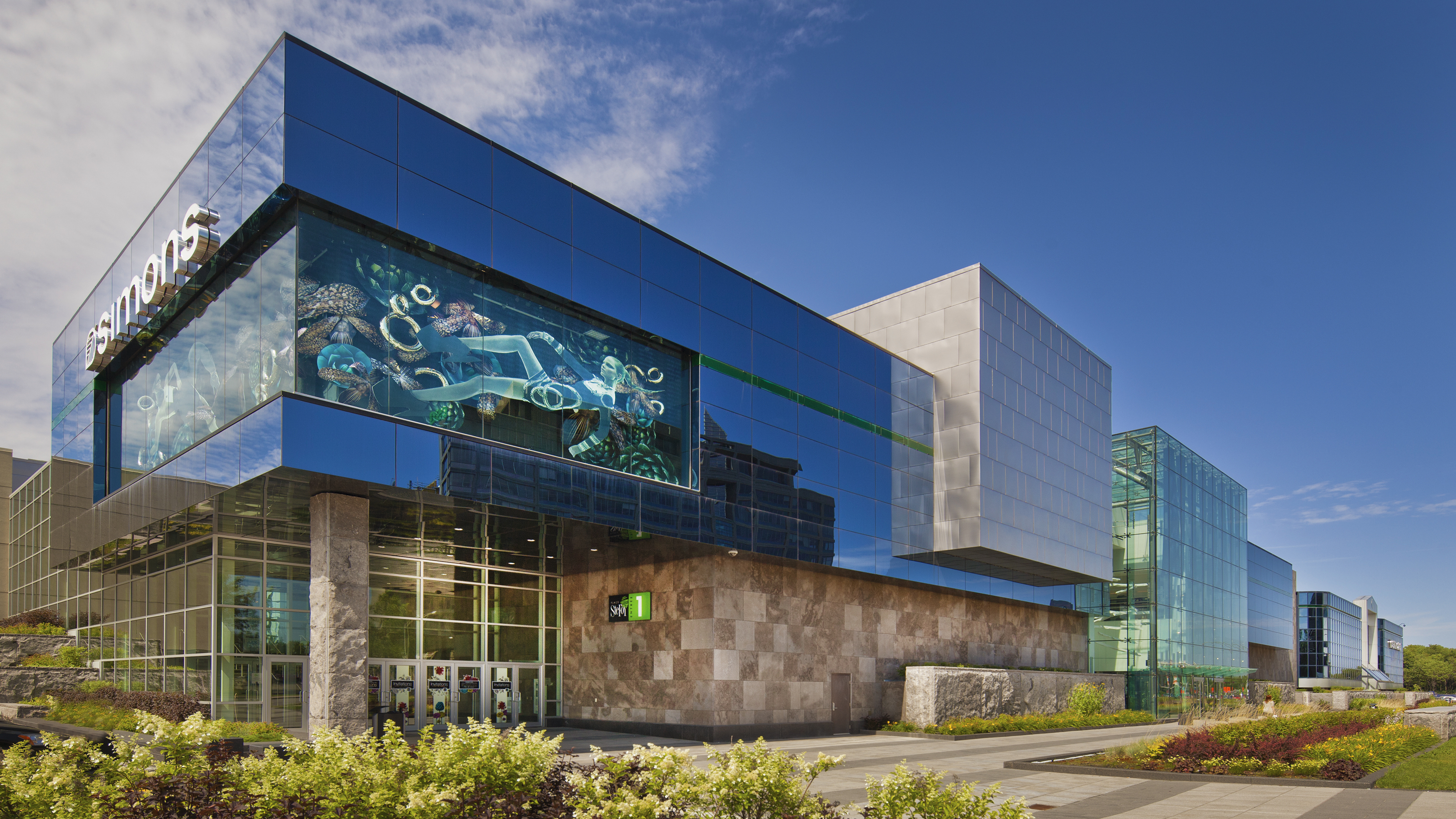
- Location: Quebec City, Quebec, Canada
- Coordinates: 46.7735°N 71.279°W
- Address: 2450, boulevard Laurier
- Opened: November 27, 1958
- Developer: Ivanhoe Corporation
- Manager: JLL
- Owner: Ivanhoé Cambridge
- Num. of stores: 135
- Num. of anchor tenants: 5
- Floor area: 590,000 sq ft (55,000 m^{2})
- Floors: 1
- Parking: 3000
- Website: www.placestefoy.com/en

Place Sainte-Foy is an upscale shopping mall located in the former city of Sainte-Foy of Quebec City, Quebec, Canada. It is owned by Ivanhoé Cambridge and managed by JLL.

The anchors are Simons, Signature Maurice Tanguay, Metro, Saks Off 5th and Archambault. The mall has 135 stores covering 590,000 square feet (54,800 square metres) including the first Apple Store in the Capitale-Nationale. The mall is situated next to Université Laval and to the shopping malls Laurier Québec and Place de la Cité.

Place Sainte-Foy originated in November 1957 with only a Steinberg supermarket and evolved into the shopping centre that inaugurated a year later on November 27, 1958. It was built and managed by Ivanhoe Corporation. Initially a strip mall, Place Sainte-Foy was enclosed in 1964, becoming Ivanhoe's first shopping centre to convert. From 2004 to 2012, Place Sainte-Foy was owned in equal proportions by Ivanhoé Cambridge and Commerzbank AG (Commerz Real) of Germany. Ivanhoé Cambridge continued to be manager of the mall during those years.

There have been a number of prominent department stores throughout the mall's history. A new Eaton store opened around September 1975 and lasted until the demise of the chain in 1999. Eaton was located where is today the Maurice Tanguay furniture store which moved to Place Ste-Foy in 2001 from an existing location in Quebec City. Holt Renfrew was in the shopping mall for 50 years, from 1965 to 2015. There was also a Miracle Mart in the mall starting in the 1960s that later became a M store. Les Ailes de la Mode selected Place Sainte-Foy to open a store in 1997 that eventually closed around 2014-2015. Simons has been at Place Sainte-Foy since 1961 and doubled its size in 2007.

== See also ==
- Laurier Québec
- Galeries de la Capitale
- Fleur de Lys centre commercial
- List of largest enclosed shopping malls in Canada
