= List of largest shopping centres in Canada =

This is list of the largest shopping centres in Canada.

== Largest enclosed shopping malls ==
The following is a list of Canada's largest enclosed shopping malls, by reported total retail floor space, or gross leasable area (GLA) with 74,000 square metres (800,000 ft^{2}) and over. In cases where malls have equal areas, they are further ranked by the number of stores.

Mall name, location	Prv	Retail space (sq. ft.)	Retail space (m^{2})	Stores	Main tenants	Ownership (property manager)	Year opened	Annual visitors	Revenue per square foot
West Edmonton Mall, Edmonton	Alberta	3,800,000	350,000	800	Simons, T & T Supermarket, Scotiabank Theatre, The Rec Room, Galaxyland, World Waterpark, Victoria's Secret, Zara, Sport Chek, H&M, Dollarama, Winners, HomeSense, Marshalls, Structube, West Edmonton Mall Toyota, Old Navy, Uniqlo, Harry Rosen, The Brick, Indigo, Louis Vuitton, Urban Planet, Apple Store, Sephora, Hollister, American Eagle Outfitters, Abercrombie & Fitch, Mark's, DSW, Starlight Casino, Anthropologie, London Drugs, Coach	Triple Five Group	1981	28 million	$767
Square One, Mississauga	Ontario	2,200,000	200,000	360	Walmart, Holt Renfrew, Simons, Harry Rosen Inc., Crate & Barrel, Whole Foods Market, The Rec Room, Zara, Sport Chek, Victoria's Secret, Apple Store, H&M, Gap, Shoppers Drug Mart, GoodLife Fitness, Urban Outfitters, Urban Planet, Sephora, Old Navy, American Eagle Outfitters, Indigo, Dollarama, Uniqlo	Oxford Properties/AIMCo	1973	24 million	$1064
Eaton Centre*, Toronto	Ontario	2,054,954	190,911	330	Canadian Tire, Sport Chek, Atmosphere, Shoppers Drug Mart, Zara, Best Buy, Mark's, Victoria's Secret, Apple Store, H&M, Gap, American Eagle Outfitters, Hollister, Old Navy, Harry Rosen, Swarovski, Uniqlo, Sephora, Indigo, Abercrombie & Fitch, Lululemon Athletica, Banana Republic, Coach, Lacoste	Cadillac Fairview	1977	50 million	$1528
Yorkdale Shopping Centre, Toronto	Ontario	2,000,000	190,000	270	Indigo, Uniqlo, Canada Goose, Arc'teryx, Holt Renfrew, Cineplex Cinemas, Sport Chek, Crate & Barrel, Samsung Store, Pottery Barn, Williams-Sonoma, Shoppers Drug Mart, Apple Store, Harry Rosen, H&M, Zara, Banana Republic, Cartier, Coach, Louis Vuitton, Kate Spade New York, Ted Baker, Tesla, Tumi, Rolex	Oxford Properties/AIMCo	1964	18 million	$1964
Scarborough Town Centre, Toronto	Ontario	1,600,000	150,000	250	Walmart, Cineplex Cinemas, Real Canadian Superstore, Best Buy, Shoppers Drug Mart, American Eagle Outfitters, Dollarama, Gap, H&M, Old Navy, Urban Planet, Victoria's Secret, Zara, Muji, Sephora, Michael Kors	Oxford Properties/AIMCo	1973	22 million	$866
Metropolis at Metrotown, Burnaby	British Columbia	1,573,547	146,187	362	Walmart, Real Canadian Superstore, Winners, HomeSense, T & T Supermarket, Cineplex Cinemas, Sport Chek / Atmosphere, H&M, Victoria's Secret, Indigo, Sephora, Shoppers Drug Mart, Old Navy, Zara, Gap, Apple Store, Samsung Store, Uniqlo, Swarovski, American Eagle Outfitters, Lululemon Athletica	Ivanhoé Cambridge (JLL)	1986	28.7 million	$1031
Bramalea City Centre, Brampton	Ontario	1,500,000	140,000	342	Best Buy, Metro, FreshCo, Shoppers Drug Mart, Sport Chek, GoodLife Fitness, Old Navy, H&M, American Eagle Outfitters, Dollarama, Hollister, Sephora, Urban Planet, Forever 21	Morguard	1973	16 million	$580
Galeries de la Capitale, Quebec City	Quebec	1,500,000	138,982	280	Simons, Mega Parc Amusement Park, Best Buy, Sports Experts/Atmosphère, IMAX, American Eagle Outfitters, Dollarama, H&M	Oxford Properties/CPP Investments	1981	10 million	$646
Chinook Centre, Calgary	Alberta	1,376,854	127,913	242	Scotiabank Theatre, Pottery Barn, Gap, Sport Chek, Sport Chek Women, Chapters, Urban Outfitters, Apple Store, Victoria's Secret, H&M, Shoppers Drug Mart, Zara, Sephora, Harry Rosen, Anthropologie, Williams-Sonoma, Michael Kors	Cadillac Fairview	1960	15 million	$1,075
Park Royal, West Vancouver	British Columbia	1,370,000	127,000	225	Indigo, Simons, Loblaws CityMarket, London Drugs, Sport Chek, Atmosphere, Winners, Staples, Best Buy, Cineplex Cinemas, Urban Outfitters, Zara, H&M, Aritzia, Anthropologie, The Brick	Larco Investments LTD	1950	15 million	$874
Oshawa Centre, Oshawa	Ontario	1,219,962	113,338	237	H&M, Victoria's Secret, Sport Chek, Staples, Shoppers Drug Mart, GoodLife Fitness, Indigo, Old Navy	Ivanhoé Cambridge (JLL)	1956	7.8 million	$666
Carrefour Laval, Laval	Quebec	1,217,427	113,103	300	Sporting Life, Rona, Simons, H&M, Zara, Victoria's Secret, Apple Store, Coach, A|X Armani Exchange, Lego Store, Renaud-Bray, Sports Experts, Atmosphere	Cadillac Fairview	1974	11 million	$887
Sherway Gardens, Toronto	Ontario	1,197,417	111,244	215	H&M, Zara, Apple Store, Pottery Barn, Sport Chek, Atmosphere, Sporting Life, Abercrombie & Fitch, Lululemon Athletica, Nike, Nespresso, Tiffany & Co., Williams-Sonoma	Cadillac Fairview	1971	8.7 million	$1099
Guildford Town Centre, Surrey	British Columbia	1,196,400	111,150	215	Walmart, London Drugs, Old Navy, H&M, Victoria's Secret, Uniqlo, Sport Chek, Forever 21	Ivanhoé Cambridge (JLL)	1966	14.5 million	$875
Laurier Québec, Quebec City	Quebec	1,176,691	109,318	265	Walmart, Marshalls, Best Buy, Linen Chest, Old Navy, Renaud-Bray, Sports Experts, Atmosphere	IC/DMA*	1961	11.4 million	$531
Carrefour de l'Estrie, Sherbrooke	Quebec	1,147,382	107,798	140	Simons, Super C, H&M, Sports Experts, Urban Planet, Marshalls, Old Navy, Renaud-Bray, Best Buy	Groupe Mach	1973	6.7 million	$455
Rideau Centre*, Ottawa	Ontario	1,128,673	104,857	150	La Maison Simons, Apple Store, Shoppers Drug Mart, Sport Chek, Old Navy, GoodLife Fitness, H&M, Gap Inc., American Eagle Outfitters, Zara, Michael Kors, Swarovski, Kate Spade New York	Cadillac Fairview	1983	20 million	$987
Place Versailles, Montreal	Quebec	1,100,000	102,000	225	Canadian Tire, HomeSense, Winners, Maxi, Bureau en Gros, Sports Experts, Dollarama	Place Versailles, Inc.	1963	8 million	$804
Southcentre Mall, Calgary	Alberta	1,057,107	97,744	143	Sport Chek, Crate & Barrel, Sporting Life, Dollarama, PetSmart, Winners, Decathlon, Restoration Hardware, Shoppers Drug Mart	Oxford Properties	1974	6.7 million	$643
Fairview Pointe-Claire, Pointe-Claire	Quebec	1,045,178	94,761	184	Simons, Winners, HomeSense, Best Buy, Sports Experts, Decathlon, Atmosphere, Old Navy, Renaud-Bray, Dollarama, Linen Chest, Apple	Cadillac Fairview	1965	8 million	$769
Promenades Saint-Bruno, Saint-Bruno-de-Montarville	Quebec	1,001,197	93,014	158	Simons, Avril, CF Marché des Promenades, Sports Experts/Atmosphere, Winners, Imaginaire, Zara, Bouclair	Primaris REIT	1978	7 million	$600
The Pen Centre, St. Catharines	Ontario	1,029,683	95,661	180	Zehrs, Landmark Cinemas, Winners, HomeSense, Sport Chek, Walmart, Mark's	Leyad	1958	11.1 million	$581
Upper Canada Mall, Newmarket	Ontario	984,502	91,497	204	Sport Chek, Victoria's Secret, Dollarama, Zara, Michael Kors, Apple Store, H&M	Oxford Properties	1974	7.4 million	$779
Kingsway Mall, Edmonton	Alberta	977,880	90,848	180	Walmart, Sport Chek, H&M, Marshalls, HomeSense, Dollarama, Urban Planet, Forever 21, Shoppers Drug Mart, Fit 4 Less, American Eagle, Designer Depot, Accents@Home Furniture	Oxford Properties	1976	6.6 million	$689
Southgate Centre, Edmonton	Alberta	940,674	87,391	160	Safeway, Crate & Barrel, American Eagle	Ivanhoé Cambridge (JLL)	1970	9.2 million	$1147
Coquitlam Centre, Coquitlam	British Columbia	932,459	86,628	198	Walmart, Best Buy, London Drugs, Sport Chek, T & T Supermarket, Atmosphere, H&M, Apple Store, Sephora, Uniqlo	Morguard	1979	12 million	$823
Polo Park, Winnipeg	Manitoba	929,278	86,332	210	Sport Chek, Shoppers Drug Mart, Scotiabank Theatre, Apple Store, Marshalls, Mark's, H&M, Urban Outfitters, Urban Planet, Victoria's Secret, Hollister, American Eagle Outfitters, EQ3, Harry Rosen, Anthropologie, Gap, Sephora, London Drugs	Cadillac Fairview	1959	11 million	$921
Les Galeries d'Anjou, Montreal	Quebec	923,779	85,822	159	Simons, Best Buy, Aubainerie, The Brick, Winners, HomeSense, Sports Experts, Atmosphere, Dollarama	Ivanhoé Cambridge (JLL)	1968	8.1 million	$637
St. Vital Centre, Winnipeg	Manitoba	927,773	86,193	164	Walmart, Sport Chek, London Drugs, SilverCity, Indigo, Marshalls, HomeSense, Dollarama, Mark's, Sephora	Leyad	1979	8.6 million	$615
The Shops at Pickering City Centre, Pickering	Ontario	902,141	83,812	203	Cineplex Cinemas, Winners, HomeSense, H&M, Shoppers Drug Mart, Farm Boy	Ontario Pension Board (Cushman & Wakefield)	1972	9.88 million	$488
Place Rosemère, Rosemère	Quebec	891,354	82,809	205	Walmart, Best Buy, Nuevo, Zara, H&M, Pharmaprix	Morguard	1975	8 million	$490
Bayshore Shopping Centre, Ottawa	Ontario	883,250	82,057	192	Walmart, Winners, HomeSense, H&M, Zara, Sport Chek, Old Navy, Apple, Sephora	Kingsett Capital	1973	7 million	$707
St. Laurent Centre, Ottawa	Ontario	880,736	81,823	186	Sport Chek, Shoppers Drug Mart, GoodLife Fitness	Morguard	1967	13.4 million	$551
Fairview Mall, Toronto	Ontario	875,357	81,323	169	Cineplex Cinemas, Sport Chek, Hollister, Sephora, Zara, Shoppers Drug Mart, Apple Store, Lego Store	Cadillac Fairview	1970	14 million	$956
Markville Shopping Centre, Markham	Ontario	853,058	79,250	153	Walmart, Best Buy, Winners, Sporting Life, GoodLife Fitness, Hollister, Shoppers Drug Mart, Muji, Uniqlo, Marshalls, Sephora, Coach, Apple Store	Cadillac Fairview	1982	12 million	$809
Erin Mills Town Centre, Mississauga	Ontario	847,532	78,738	185	Walmart, Cineplex Junxion, Old Navy, Shoppers Drug Mart	Ontario Pension Board (Cushman & Wakefield)	1989	9 million	$536
Royalmount, Mount Royal	Quebec	824,000	76,552	170	Sports Experts, Zara, H&M, Cineplex, The Rec Room, Nike, Gucci, Balenciaga, Canada Goose, Pandora, Rolex, Sephora	Carbonleo	2024		
Carrefour Angrignon, Montreal	Quebec	822,160	76,381	180	Urban Behavior, Bureau en Gros, Best Buy, Linen Chest, Pharmaprix, Sports Experts, Atmosphere, Aubainerie, Famous Players, Sephora, Old Navy	Westcliff / Montez Corp	1986	6.5 million	$430
Lime Ridge Mall, Hamilton	Ontario	810,793	75,998	164	Sport Chek, Hollister, Victoria's Secret	Primaris Management	1981	10 million	$749
Sunridge Mall, Calgary	Alberta	803,853	77,179	150	Sport Chek, Old Navy	Primaris Management	1981	6 million	$490

== Shopping malls ==
The following is a list of other notable enclosed shopping malls in Canada.

Mall name, location	Prv	Retail space (sq. ft.)	Retail space (m^{2})	Stores	Main tenants	Ownership (property manager)	Year opened	Annual visitors	Revenue per square foot
Londonderry Mall, Edmonton	Alberta	776,749	72,162	150+	Simons, Zellers, Shoppers Drug Mart, Winners, H&M, No Frills, Fit4Less, Dollarama, Dollar Tree	Leyad	1972	6 million	
Place d'Orléans, Ottawa	Ontario	761,000	70,699	175	Sport Chek, GoodLife Fitness, AUB44 by Aubainerie, Mark's	Primaris Management	1979	5.8 million	$440
Place Vertu, Montreal	Quebec	735,851	77,861	130	Continental, Winners, Canadian Tire, Adonis Supermarket, Gold's Gym, Dollarama, Uniprix, Sports Experts, Atmosphere, Sports Rousseau, Urban Planet	LaSalle Investment Management (Westcliff)	1975	1.6 million	$210
Edmonton City Centre*, Edmonton	Alberta	725,000	67,354	170	Winners, Landmark Cinemas, Dollarama, Shoppers Drug Mart	LaSalle	1974	9.2 million	$405
Market Mall, Calgary	Alberta	719,470	66,840	210	Safeway, Sport Chek, Landmark Cinemas, Sporting Life, Decathlon	CF/IC*	1970	10.4 million	$916
Pacific Centre*, Vancouver	British Columbia	712,404	66,184	86	Apple Store, Holt Renfrew, H&M, Harry Rosen, Michael Kors, Hollister, Abercrombie and Fitch	Cadillac Fairview	1971	23 million	$1865
Mail Champlain, Brossard	Quebec	698,211		127	Continental, Decathlon, Mayrand, Renaud-Bray	Cominar Real Estate Investment Trust	1975	5 million	$342
Centre Laval, Laval	Quebec	691,451		93	Urban Behavior, Marshalls, HomeSense, The Brick, Decathlon, Avril, Best Buy	Cominar Real Estate Investment Trust	1968	5 million	$353
Masonville Place, London	Ontario	686,000	63,700	200	SilverCity London, Zara, H&M, Sport Chek/Atmosphere, HomeSense, Marshalls, The Rec Room, Shoppers Drug Mart, Sephora	Cadillac Fairview	1985		
Oakridge Park, Vancouver	British Columbia	650,000	60,387	100+	Timeout Market, Lululemon, Aritzia, Chanel	QuadReal	2026		
Centre Rockland, Mount Royal	Quebec	640,000	59,457	153	Continental, IGA, Linen Chest, H&M, Zara, Sports Experts, Atmosphere, Pharmaprix, Renaud-Bray	Cominar Real Estate Investment Trust	1959	6.5 million	$450
Richmond Centre, Richmond	British Columbia	638,989	59,364	183	Sport Chek, Zara, H&M, Old Navy, Abercrombie and Fitch, Uniqlo, Lego Store, Apple Store, Muji, Nike, Shoppers Drug Mart	Cadillac Fairview	1965	13.2 million	$1088
Mapleview Centre; Burlington	Ontario	635,531	59,042.8	150	Decathlon, Sporting Life, Linen Chest	Ivanhoé Cambridge (JLL)	1990		
Hillcrest Mall, Richmond Hill	Ontario	617,709	54,418	135	Sport Chek, Sporting Life, Marshalls, HomeSense, Old Navy, H&M, Gap, Indigo	Oxford Properties	1974		
Place Sainte-Foy, Quebec City	Quebec	616,048	57,232	123	Signature Maurice Tanguay, Simons, Archambault, Atmosphere, Metro	Ivanhoé Cambridge (JLL)	1958	8.3 million	$804
Cataraqui Centre, Kingston	Ontario	607,000	56,400	141	H&M, Sport Chek, Indigo Books, Shoppers Drug Mart	Primaris Management	1982	4.1 million	
The Core*, Calgary	Alberta	600,000	55,742	160+	Holt Renfrew, Devonian Gardens, Harry Rosen, H&M, Gap, Indigo, Shoppers Drug Mart	Cushman & Wakefield	1977		
Centre Eaton*, Montréal	Quebec	470,500	43,700	137	Decathlon, Aritzia, Levi’s, Gap, Old Navy, Guess	Ivanhoé Cambridge (JLL)	1990	21,1 million	$983
Bayview Village Shopping Centre, Toronto	Ontario	444,000	41,248	110	Loblaws, Shoppers Drug Mart	QuadReal Property Group	1963		
Bay Centre*, Victoria	British Columbia	440,076	40,884	90	Winners, Sport Chek	Cushman & Wakefield	1990		
Portage Place*, Winnipeg	Manitoba	439,600	40,840	100+	Staples, Shoppers Drug Mart, A Buck or Two	Starlight Investments	1987		
St. Albert Centre, St. Albert	Alberta	373,000	34,700	80	Winners, London Drugs, Mark's, Canadian Tire, Sport Chek	Leyad	1980		
Cityplace*, Winnipeg	Manitoba	337,000	31,300	40+	Rexall, Manitoba Liquor Control Commission, Shark Club Gaming Centre	Triovest Realty Advisors Inc.	1979		
Cascade Shops*, Banff	Alberta	126,999	11,798	30+	Dollarama, The Old Spaghetti Factory, Ardene, IDA Pharmacy	Atlas Development Corporation	1989	4 million	

== Outlet malls ==
This is a list of outlets in Canada.

#	Mall name	City	Prv	Retail space (sq ft)	Stores	Anchor stores/entertainment venues	Year opened	Ownership (property manager)	Annual visitors	Revenue per square foot
1	Vaughan Mills**	Vaughan	Ontario	1,270,111	222	Bass Pro Shops Outdoor World, Old Navy, Victoria's Secret, Winners, HomeSense, Marshalls, Uniqlo, H&M, Legoland Discovery Centre, Nike Factory Store	2004	Ivanhoé Cambridge (JLL)		
2	CrossIron Mills**	Calgary	Alberta	1,178,000	191	Bass Pro Shops Outdoor World, SilverCity, Sport Chek, Victoria's Secret, Winners, Pro Hockey Life, Designer Shoe Warehouse, Old Navy, H&M, Urban Planet, HomeSense, Indigo, Nike, Shoppers Drug Mart, Forever 21	2009	Ivanhoé Cambridge (JLL)	9.2 million	$694
3	Tsawwassen Mills**	Delta	British Columbia	1,097,346	188	DSW, Gap, Michael Kors, Winners, Bass Pro Shops, Marshalls	2016	Central Walk	4.1 million	$347
4	Toronto Premium Outlets	Halton Hills	Ontario	800,000	100+	Restoration Hardware Outlet	2013	Simon Property Group/SmartCentres REIT		
5	Dixie Outlet Mall**	Mississauga	Ontario	576,722	130		1956	Slate Asset Management (Cushman & Wakefield)		
6	Outlet Collection at Niagara	Niagara-on-the-Lake	Ontario	553,362	109		2014	Ivanhoé Cambridge (JLL)		
7	Canada One	Niagara Falls	Ontario	431,345	30+		1998	Primaris Management		
8	Premium Outlet Collection EIA**	Leduc	Alberta	420,740	101	DSW, H&M, Nike Factory Store, Old Navy Outlet, Marshalls	2018	Ivanhoé Cambridge / Simon Property Group		
9	Outlet Collection Winnipeg**	Winnipeg	Manitoba	406,500	98	DSW	2017	Ivanhoé Cambridge (JLL)		
10	Premium Outlets Montreal	Mirabel	Québec	366,405	84		2014	Simon Property Group/SmartCentres REIT		
11	Tanger Outlets Ottawa	Ottawa	Ontario	355,003	75+		2014	Tanger Factory Outlet Centers/RioCan		
12	McArthurGlen Designer Outlet Vancouver Airport	Richmond	British Columbia	340,000	90+		2015	McArthurGlen Group / Simon Property Group		
13	Tanger Outlets Cookstown**	Cookstown	Ontario	307,779	70+		1995	Tanger Factory Outlet Centers/RioCan		
14	Windsor Crossing Premium Outlets	Windsor	Ontario	207,000	40+		1999	Pivotal Commercial Realty		
15	Carrefour Champêtre Bromont	Bromont	Québec	162,000	30+		2004	Groupe Quint		
16	Factoreries Mont Saint-Sauveur	Saint-Sauveur	Québec	99,405	15+		1980	Groupe Quint		
17	Factoreries Tremblant	Mont-Tremblant	Québec	59,999	10+		2001	Forum Properties		

**Denotes enclosed mall.

== Outdoor lifestyle and power centres ==
This is a list of lifestyle centres and power centres in Canada.

Mall name	City	Prv	Retail space Square feet (ft²)	Stores	Main tenants	Year opened	Ownership (property manager)
Quartier DIX30	Brossard, Quebec	Québec	3,000,000	500	Walmart, Best Buy, Canadian Tire, Rona, Cineplex Odeon, H&M, Zara, The Gap, Apple Store, Dollarama, Sephora, Lululemon, Jean Coutu, Indigo, Tommy Hilfiger, Winners, HomeSense, Sports Experts, Bureau en Gros, Old Navy, Bulk Barn, Structube, Marshalls, Adonis, Michael Kors, Uniprix	2006	RioCan Real Estate Investment Trust
South Edmonton Common	Edmonton	Alberta	2,300,000	150+	The Home Depot, Canadian Tire, IKEA, Cineplex Odeon, Rona+, Real Canadian Superstore, Walmart, Staples, Best Buy, Marshalls	1998	Cameron Development Corporation
Heartland Town Centre	Mississauga	Ontario	2,200,000	180	Sephora, JD Sports, American Eagle, Malabar Gold and Diamonds, Ashley HomeStore, Best Buy, Banana Republic, Costco, Dollarama, H&M, HomeSense, JYSK, Harry Rosen Outlet, Loblaws, Marshalls, Michaels, Moores, Old Navy, Party City, PetSmart, The Brick, Seafood City, Staples, Tommy Hilfiger, Uniqlo, Walmart, Winners	2001	Orlando Corporation
Carrefour de la Rive-Sud	Boucherville	Quebec	1,200,000	60+	Ikea, Costco, Rona, Winners, HomeSense, Marshalls, Staples, Structube	2010	North American Development Group (Centrecorp)
Faubourg Boisbriand	Boisbriand, Quebec	Québec	1,173,887				North American Development Group (Centrecorp)
Marché Central	Montreal, Quebec	Québec	963,040		Best Buy, MEC, The Brick, American Eagle, Nike, Tommy Hilfiger, Golf Town, DeSerres, Bouclair Maison, Marshalls, HomeSense, Dollarama, Bureau en Gros, Winners, Mark's, Reno-Depot, Costco, Decathlon, Walmart	1998	QuadReal
The Centre on Barton	Hamilton, Ontario	Ontario	806,017		Walmart, Metro, Marshalls, Fit 4 Less, Giant Tiger, The Brick, Michaels, Staples, Mark's, Dollarama, Canadian Tire, PetSmart, Shoppers Drug Mart	2008	TRIOVEST
Les Avenues Vaudreuil	Vaudreuil-Dorion	Quebec	737,000	99	Costco, Winners, Sail, Homesense, The Gap, Tommy Hilfiger	2006	Harden
Meadowlands Power Centre	Hamilton, Ontario	Ontario	589,209		Sobeys, Staples, Dollarama, Mark's, PetSmart, Structube, Sport Chek, Michaels, Best Buy, Marshalls, HomeSense, DSW, Lastman's Bad Boy, Costco, Home Depot	1995	RioCan Real Estate Investment Trust
SmartCentres Laval West	Laval, Quebec	Quebec	586,690	35+	Walmart, Reno Depot, IGA, Canadian Tire	2000	Riocan
Centropolis	Laval, Québec	Québec	550,873			2000	Cominar
Shops at Don Mills	Toronto, Ontario	Ontario	511,824		Cineplex VIP Cinemas, Metro, L.L. Bean, Swarovski, Lindt	2009	Cadillac Fairview
Méga-Centre Ste-Dorothée	Laval, Quebec	Quebec	500,000	25	Winners. HomeSense, Gap, Banana Republic, SAQ, Sephora	2002	Harden
Heritage Greene Shopping Centre	Hamilton, Ontario	Ontario	400,000		Indigo, Pro Hockey Life, PetSmart, Michaels, Best Buy, The Home Depot, Ashley HomeStore, Cineplex Cinemas	2009	Effort Trust
Village at Park Royal	West Vancouver, British Columbia	British Columbia	244,797			2004	

*Denotes downtown mall.

== See also ==
- List of largest shopping malls in the United States
- List of shopping malls in Montreal
- List of shopping malls in Toronto
- List of shopping malls in Canada
- List of shopping malls in Saskatoon
- List of shopping malls in Greater Longueuil
- List of the world's largest shopping malls
- Montreal underground city malls
