= J. Pascal's Hardware and Furniture =

Canadian hardware retail chain

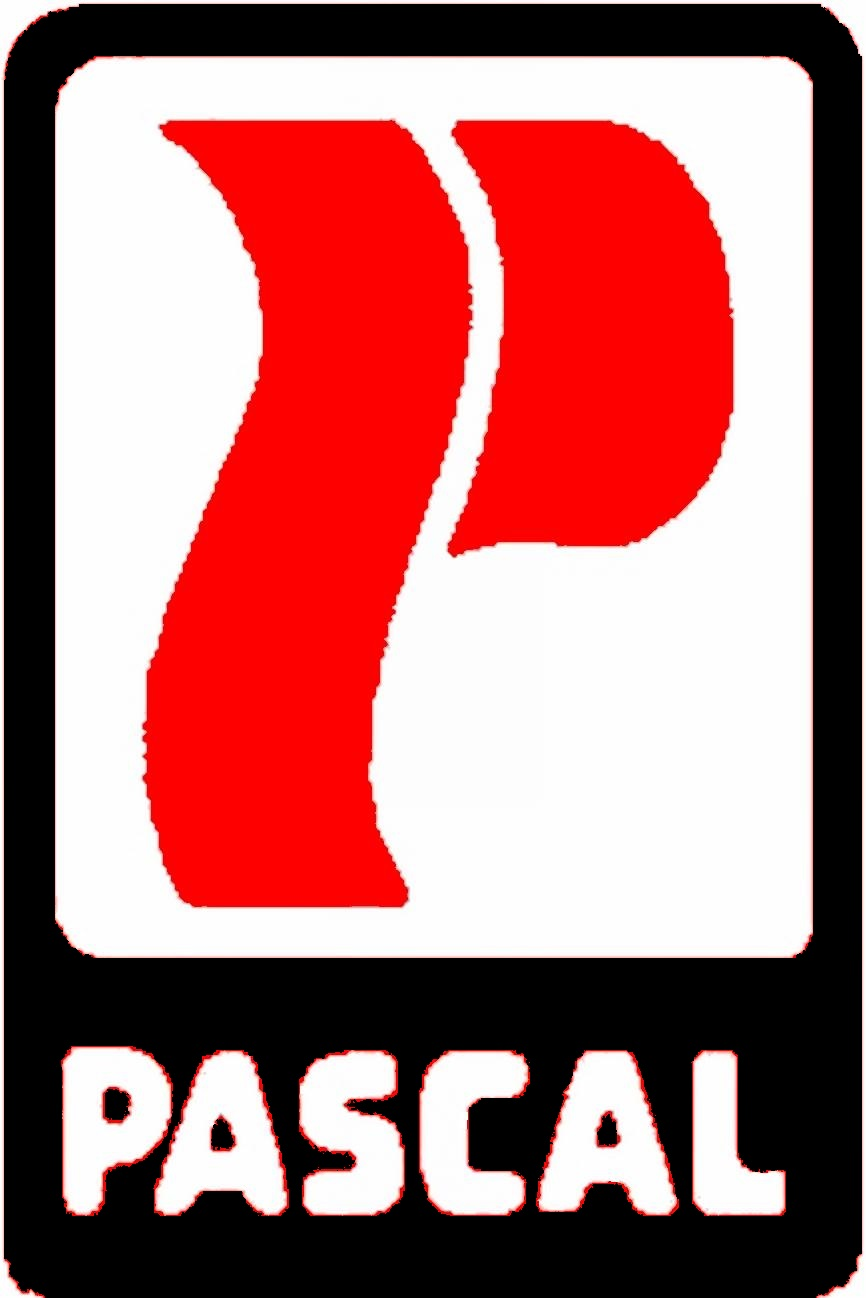
- Type: Private
- Industry: Retail
- Founded: 1903
- Founder: Jacob Pascal
- Defunct: 1991 (Hardware Stores); 1994 (Furniture Stores); 2008 (Pascal Hotel Supplies)
- Fate: Bankruptcy
- Headquarters: Montreal, Quebec, Canada
- Key people: Jacob Pascal; Maxwell Pascal; Arthur Pascal; Hyman Pascal; Cecil Pascal
- Products: Household hardware Furniture

J. Pascal's Hardware and Furniture was a Montreal, Quebec, Canada-based chain of hardware and furniture stores.

== History ==
J. Pascal had long been a hardware chain only, but subsequently expanded to furniture retailing. Until the 1970s, the company's name was J. Pascal Hardware Co. After the furniture division was created in the 1980s, the company's corporate name became J. Pascal Inc. Although both operated under the trade name "Pascal" and shared a common logo, the hardware and furniture chains were kept separate in terms of operations and outlets. The hardware stores were found mostly in enclosed shopping malls and commercial streets, while the furniture stores were in strip malls.

J. Pascal was in business for almost 90 years and operated 26 hardware and furniture stores in the provinces of Quebec, Ontario and New Brunswick before going bankrupt on May 16, 1991. Only the flagship hardware division was closed. The spin-off furniture division would survive another three years before closing in 1994. It was the last major Canadian furniture retailer to go bankrupt. After Pascal went out of business, a small furniture chain started to use the name under the trademark "Club Meubles Pascal", resulting in a legal battle with J. Pascal in 1996.

Throughout its existence J. Pascal remained a family business, belonging to three generations of the Pascal family. It was founded in 1903 by Jacob Pascal, and then taken over by his sons, Maxwell Pascal, Arthur Pascal, Hyman Pascal, and Cecil Pascal.

=== Pascal Hotel Supplies ===
Pascal Hotel Supplies wasn't affected by the bankruptcy of the parent company and was in operation until 2008. Pascal Hotel Supplies' sole store was located on 1040 Bleury Street in downtown Montreal, not far from the former headquarters of Pascal. Pascal Hotel Supplies remained the property of the Pascal family until the early 2000s. The new owners retained the Pascal name for the business until its closure in 2008.

=== Pascal Architectural Hardware ===
The remaining part of the Pascals empire specialises in hardware relating to building finishing, e.g., locks and hinges. It is located on Queen Mary Road in the Côte-des-Neiges neighbourhood of Montreal.

== Selected locations ==
This is a list of locations operated by Pascal during its lifetime.

=== Quebec ===
- Dorval — Jardins Dorval
- Greenfield Park — Place Greenfield Park
- Lachine — Rue Notre Dame
- LaSalle — Carrefour Angrignon
- LaSalle — Rue Dollard
- Laval — Carrefour Laval
- Montreal — Faubourg Sainte-Catherine
- Montreal — Galeries Normandie
- Montreal — Place Versailles
- Montreal — Côte-des-Neiges Rd.
- Montreal — Rue de Bleury (901 Bleury Head Office and Store below)
- Montreal — Ave Du Parc
- Montreal — Rue de Bleury (restaurant supplies)
- Pointe-Claire — Fairview Pointe-Claire
- Quebec City/Vanier — Place Fleur de Lys
- Saint-Jean-sur-Richelieu— Rue Pierre Caisse (adjacent to Carrefour Richelieu)
- Saint-Laurent — Place Vertu
- Saint-Laurent — Centre Le Bazaar (furniture)
- Saint-Léonard — Rue Jean-Talon Est, near Boulevard Langelier (furniture)
- Saint-Léonard — Boulevard Shopping Centre
- Sainte-Foy — Place Laurier
- Sherbrooke — Carrefour de l'Estrie
- Trois-Rivières-Ouest - Carrefour Trois-Rivières-Ouest
- Verdun — Boul. Wellington
- Westmount — Sherbrooke St.

=== Ontario ===
- Brampton — Shoppers World Brampton (hardware)
- Gloucester — Gloucester Centre
- Mississauga — Dixie Outlet Mall (hardware); Hurontario Street (furniture)
- Nepean — Merivale Road in Meadowlands Mall (hardware & furniture)
- Newmarket — Upper Canada Mall (hardware & furniture)
- Ottawa — Rideau Street
- Scarborough — Warehouse (Finch Avenue East and Markham Road), store (Woodside Square at Finch Avenue East and McCowan Road)
- Thornhill — Thornhill Square
