= Sears Canada =

Canadian department store chain

Sears Canada Inc.

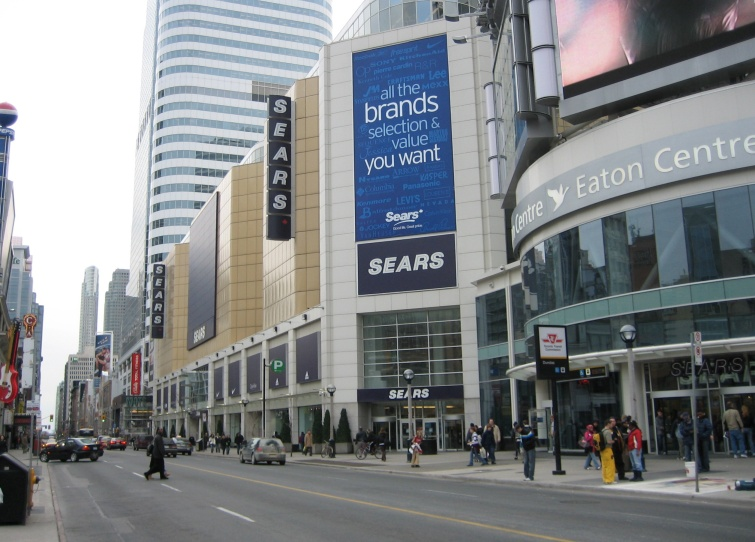
- The former flagship store and headquarters at Toronto Eaton Centre; the store closed in 2014, and the headquarters closed in 2018
- Formerly: Simpsons-Sears (1952–1984)
- Type: Public
- Traded as: Expert Market: SRSCQ
- Industry: Retail
- Founded: September 18, 1952; 74 years ago
- Defunct: January 14, 2018; 8 years ago
- Fate: Bankruptcy and liquidation
- Headquarters: Toronto Eaton Centre, Toronto, Ontario, Canada
- Key people: Brandon G. Stranzl (executive chairman until October 16, 2017); Becky Penrice (executive vice president & COO); Herbert Becker (chief financial officer); Mark Cohen (former chairman & CEO)
- Products: Clothing, footwear, bedding, furniture, jewellery, beauty products, appliances, housewares, tools, electronics and toys
- Revenue: $3.146 billion (2015)
- Net income: ▼$−67.9 million (2015)
- Total equity: $554.2 million (2015)
- Number of employees: 58 (April 2018)
- Parent: Sears (1952–2005); Sears Holdings (2005–2018)
- Website: Archive of website

Sears Canada Inc. was a publicly traded Canadian company affiliated with the American-based Sears department store chain. In operation from 1952 until 2018 and headquartered in Toronto, the company began as Simpsons-Sears—a joint venture between the Canadian Simpsons department store chain and the American Sears chain—which operated a national mail order business and co-branded Simpsons-Sears stores modelled after those of Sears in the U.S. After the Hudson's Bay Company purchased Simpsons in 1978, the joint venture was dismantled and Hudson's Bay sold its shares in the joint venture to Sears; with Sears now fully owning the company, it was renamed Sears Canada Inc. in 1984. In 1999, Sears Canada acquired the remaining assets and locations of the historic Canadian chain Eaton's. From 2014, Sears Holdings owned a 10% share in the company. ESL Investments was the largest shareholder of Sears Canada. Sears Canada operated 125 full-line department stores at its peak.

In 2016, Sears Canada had a network that included 140 corporate stores (including full-line, Sears Home, and Sears Outlet stores), 71 Hometown stores, over 900 catalogue and online merchandise pick-up locations, 69 Sears Travel offices, and a nationwide repair and service network. The company also published a general merchandise catalogue until the last quarter of 2016 and offered shopping online at sears.ca until October 19, 2017.

After filing for creditor protection in June 2017, Sears Canada announced it would close 20 full-line locations, 15 Home stores, 10 Outlet stores, and 14 Sears Hometown stores. The closings resulted in 2,900 employee layoffs. These stores officially closed on Sunday, October 1, 2017. In September 2017, Sears Canada announced the closing of 10 additional stores, in addition to the 59 store closings previously announced in June. On October 10, 2017, Sears Canada announced that it would seek court approval to shutter all of its remaining stores in Canada and lay off 11,240 remaining staff. The approval was granted by the Ontario Superior Court on October 13, 2017.

Liquidation sales began on October 19, 2017. The remaining Sears stores closed on January 14, 2018. Store fixtures and equipment from the closed stores were sold until January 26, 2018.

== History ==
=== Operations during 20th century ===
==== Simpsons-Sears ====
Sears Canada began its operations as Simpsons-Sears Limited, a catalogue and mid-market suburban retailer that was a joint venture between the Robert Simpson Company Limited, a Canadian department store chain, and Sears, Roebuck and Co. of the United States. In 1952, Sears Chairman General Robert E. Wood sent a letter to Simpsons President Edgar G. Burton, proposing a partnership between their two companies in order to serve the Canadian market. The deal to create Simpsons-Sears Limited, a Canadian catalogue and department store chain separate from the Simpson's chain, was signed on September 18, 1952. The new company would be a 50–50 partnership; Simpsons and Sears both invested $20 million and had equal representation on Simpsons-Sears' board of directors. The new company had two main objectives: to expand Simpson's mail-order business (which was sold to the new company) and to build a string of stores modelled on Sears' format across the country.

The agreement also contained a provision that would become a major challenge in later years. Under its terms, Simpsons-Sears could not open a retail store within 25 miles of Simpsons' existing stores in Toronto, Montreal, Halifax, Regina, and London. In return, Simpsons promised not to build any stores outside of those five cities. Simpsons-Sears' mail-order business, however, was free to operate anywhere in Canada, as was the new Simpsons-Sears Acceptance Company, the credit arm of the operation.

The business operations of Simpsons-Sears began when the first Simpsons-Sears Spring/Summer Catalogue was printed by Photo-Engravers and Electrotypers, Ltd. and delivered to 300,000 Canadian homes in early 1953. On September 17, 1953, the first Simpsons-Sears retail store opened in Stratford, Ontario; the second store opened in Kamloops, British Columbia in December of that year. In 1954, Simpsons-Sears opened Canada's first large suburban department store, in Vancouver – Burnaby, BC, based on new the modern Sears, Roebuck model, spreading across the U.S.

Simpsons-Sears introduced the slogan "We Service What We Sell" in 1955, backed up by a highly trained nationwide corps of service technicians.

In 1963, Simpsons-Sears opened its first full-line store in Quebec, in Quebec City's Fleur de Lys complex.

The company made its public debut on the Toronto and Montreal stock exchanges on April 5, 1965, with the listing of its Class “A” non-voting shares. That year, Sears began its long-standing partnership with the Boys and Girls Clubs of Canada, to support its youth programming.

In 1968, Simpsons-Sears became the first Canadian retailer to begin buying products from Mainland China.

In 1971, Simpsons-Sears opened a new head office building in downtown Toronto.

In 1972, Simpsons and Simpsons-Sears agreed to end the 25-mile restriction and permit Simpsons and Simpsons-Sears stores anywhere. The following year when Simpsons-Sears opened a store at Square One Shopping Centre in the city of Mississauga, the company decided to use the Sears name alone. To avoid confusing customers used to Simpsons, new stores were opened under the "Sears" banner. All existing Simpsons-Sears stores were rebranded to the Sears banner as well. However, the name of the company remained Simpsons-Sears Limited.

Also in 1973, Sears hit $1 billion in sales.

In 1974, Simpsons-Sears opened a Sears store at Hillcrest Mall in Richmond Hill, Ontario, its first location in a mall that had a Simpsons store.

==== Divestiture by Simpsons ====
In 1978, Simpsons and Simpsons-Sears put forward a plan to merge their businesses. This plan had to have the approval of the Foreign Investment Review Agency, as Sears, Roebuck would become the prime shareholder. Before approval could be attained, the Hudson's Bay Company made a counter bid and acquired Simpsons Limited. Simpsons' shares in Simpsons-Sears taken over by The Bay were eventually sold back to Sears, Roebuck. The company was renamed Sears Canada Inc. in 1984 to reflect its independence.

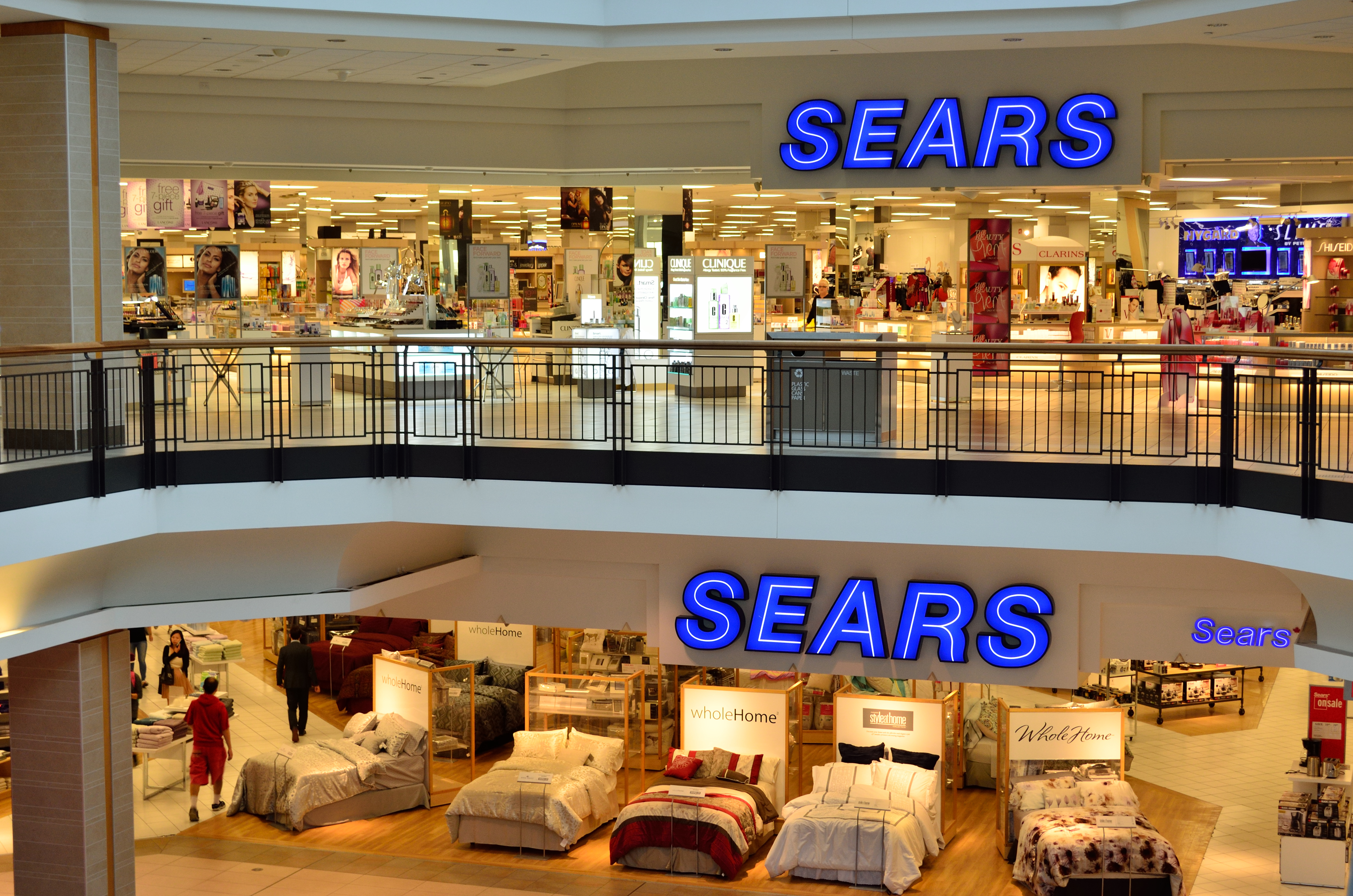
The Sears store in Fairview Mall, Toronto, one of the stores acquired from Simpsons in 1991

The paths of Hudson's Bay and Sears crossed again in 1991. The Hudson's Bay Company merged its remaining Greater Toronto Simpsons stores into its The Bay division in 1991, and the Simpsons name disappeared from Canada's retail landscape. As a result of this move, Sears Canada took over eight former Simpsons and Bay stores and finally gained a major foothold in Greater Toronto, a market from which it had been excluded by the 1952 agreement with Simpsons. These new stores featured a new 60:40 fashions; hardlines mix and introduced new boutique shop arrangements and fashion lines, such as Le Chateau, Sung, and Rouie.

Sears announced, "The Store of the Future" in 1983. It represented a complete transformation and remodelling of stores along a new product-focused and customer-friendly merchandising program. The first remodelled store, in Mississauga, Ontario, was unveiled in 1985. Stores would be fully retrofitted over the following three years.

The Sears Catalogue Club points program began in 1986. The next year, it changed to "Sears Club" to incorporate all the company's trading channels. The points of the program could no longer be earned from June 22, 2017.

==== Acquisition of Eaton's ====
In 1999, Sears Canada acquired the assets and the trademark name of the bankrupt chain The T. Eaton Company Limited. For the first time in its history, Sears Canada gained the leases to a number of prime downtown locations in Toronto (Eaton Centre), Vancouver, Victoria, Winnipeg, Ottawa, and Calgary, all former Eaton's flagship stores. The Simpsons-Sears agreement had largely shut out Sears from the urban core, and that remained so even when the restriction was lifted, as The Bay and Eaton's long held a duopoly in the downtowns of major Canadian cities. Sears Canada had also entertained notions of obtaining the former Eaton downtown Montreal store but that location was eventually occupied by Quebec retailer Les Ailes de la Mode.

=== Operations during 21st century ===
Sears relaunched "Eatons" (rendered with the lowercase "e" logo) in November 2000 as a seven-store upscale mini-brand, with locations in Vancouver, Victoria, Calgary, Winnipeg, Toronto (Eaton Centre and Yorkdale) and Ottawa, all of which had been flagship Eaton stores. At Yorkdale and Winnipeg's Polo Park, this meant that Sears Canada managed two anchor stores (Eatons and Sears) in those malls for a short time. This operation was unsuccessful, however, and Sears converted the Eatons stores to the Sears brand in 2002. Many said that the Eatons stores were too upscale and/or too thinly scattered across the country for the mini-chain to have ever been profitable and worthwhile. The retail environment has changed with more of the population shopping at big box outlets and specialty stores squeezing out the middle market which is the base of the traditional department store.

In 2005, Sears Card financial services were outsourced to JPMorgan Chase. Sears received C$3 billion for the sale, and the Sears Club points system was retained by the retailer. Sears also paid a special dividend upon the completion of the transaction. CEO Brent Hollister said that the move would allow Sears to refocus on its retail operations. Sears Canada announced it would end its credit card partnership with JPMorgan Chase when the agreement expired in November 2015.

In January 2006, Sears Holdings, the parent company and majority shareholder of Sears Canada, made a bid to purchase the remaining shares to take the company private. Some members of the board opposed the move. A ruling by the Ontario Securities Commission, made in August 2006, stalled progress the attempted privatization by its parent company, Sears Holdings Limited. While the ruling did not dispel the future possibility of the privatization of Sears Canada, it posed a significant obstacle by ruling three major shareholding blocks ineligible to vote as the blocks were given extraordinary privileges by Sears Holdings Limited. On November 14, 2006, Sears Holdings' move to privatize Sears Canada at a bid of $17.97/share fell through by voting amongst the minority shareholder groups. On March 31, 2005, the majority ownership stake was transferred to Sears Holdings, which then owned 73.1% of Sears Canada common shares, while Pershing Square Capital held 17.3%, and the remainder of the shares were publicly traded on the Toronto Stock Exchange.

On September 26, 2007, Sears Canada announced the sale of its 222 Jarvis Street headquarters to the Government of Ontario. The company relocated its head office to surplus space at its flagship store in the Toronto Eaton Centre.

==== Decline ====
Same-store sales were down 4% in 2010, compared to 6.8% in 2009. In December 2011, after slow sales over the holiday season, Sears laid off 70 employees from its head office after losing nearly $47 million in the previous quarter. Through 2003 and into 2011 the company lost $1.6 billion in revenue.

In June 2011, Calvin McDonald, formerly of Loblaw Companies, was named president and CEO of Sears Canada. McDonald planned to restructure the company's operations under a three-year plan, in the wake of increased competition and economic uncertainties. He explained that "we are in the situation that we are in because we stopped doing the things that make great retailers great. We traded ourselves into this challenge and we will trade ourselves out of it." The company had posted a $44.1 million loss in 2010 but had recovered to $21.9 million by the third quarter of 2011. Among the planned changes were to build upon market segments where Sears had historically performed well (including appliances, dresses, children's wear and related products, and mattresses), and introduce a new store format with a more "engaging" layout. In 2012, Sears sold three stores in Calgary, Ottawa, and Vancouver (Chinook Centre, Rideau Centre, and Pacific Centre) back to Cadillac Fairview for $170 million. Sears also sold its Deerfoot Mall location in Calgary, as well as its locations at Square One Shopping Centre and Yorkdale Mall. Sears Holdings also distributed shares in the company to Sears Canada's shareholders, reducing its holdings to 51%. Sears Holdings Corporation's chairman and CEO, Edward Lampert, has a 27% stake in Sears Canada. In April 2013, the company began to scale back some of its product offerings, dropping electronics and window coverings, and making toys online-only.

In September 2013, Douglas C. Campbell took over as Sears Canada's COO. The following month, Sears Canada announced that it would close five of its major urban stores and sell them back to their respective landlords, including its flagship Toronto Eaton Centre location, as well as two other locations in Toronto, one in London, and one in Richmond, British Columbia. Campbell explained that "Unlocking the value of assets is one of the three levers we have said we will use as a way to create total value for the company. When proposals such as this one are presented to us, we must weigh the value of the transaction against the value we will obtain from continuing to operate those stores in their current locations".

Campbell left Sears Canada in October 2014 and was replaced by Ronald Boire, who served until June 2015. Brandon Stranzl was appointed executive chairman in July 2015, continuing in his role as chairman of the board and also assuming the duties of the CEO. In November 2015, Carrie Kirkman was appointed president and chief merchant, a role she held until July 2016.

In late 2013, SHS Services Management, a Markham, Ontario-based contract partner, went into receivership, but Sears Canada promised to honour home improvement warranty through services offered by SHS on behalf of Sears Canada.

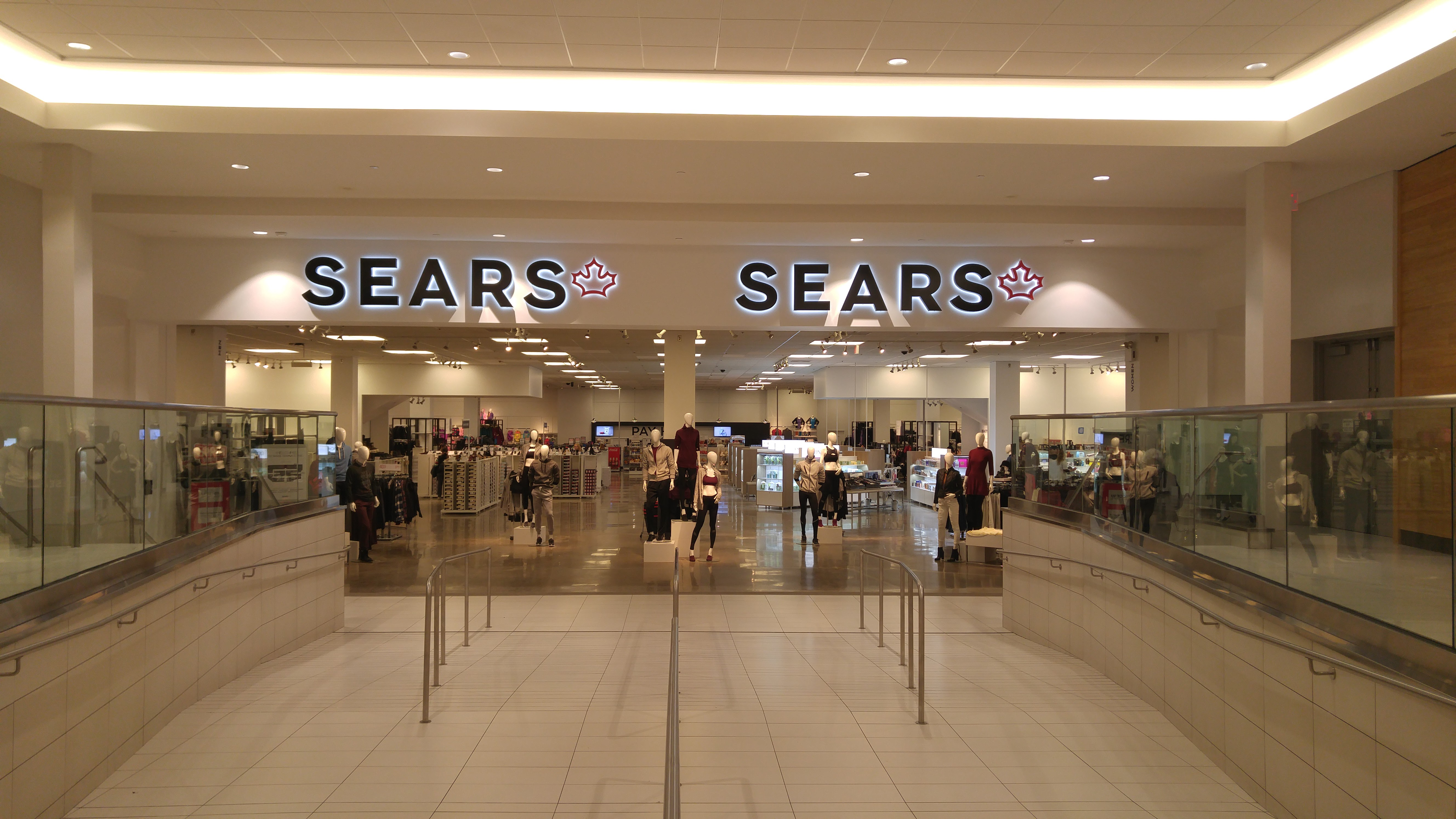
Newly renovated Sears store at the Oshawa Centre, 2017

On August 24, 2016, Sears Canada unveiled a new corporate logo, consisting of a black wordmark and a red outline of a maple leaf, to replace the blue striped wordmark that had previously been used by the U.S. Sears chain. Company representatives described the new logo as being "bold" and "confident".

In its second quarter earnings report, Sears Canada announced that it was developing a new store concept dubbed "Sears 2.0", which it planned to test at several of its current locations. In September 2016, Sears officially unveiled the new store format at its Promenade and Mapleview Centre locations, with a media launch day on September 27, 2016. The new format was designed to have a more open layout with fewer permanent displays and partitions, providing more flexibility in how departments are arranged and stocked. The footwear department was also moved to the centre of the store and switched to a "self-serve" concept, with product boxes accessible by customers (thus reducing the need for dedicated associates). Stranzl stated that the new format was meant to "take ideas from the best in the business, whether it's in shoes, outerwear or appliances", and return the chain to a "price-focused" strategy. The new format was implemented during renovation of the Stone Road Mall location in Guelph.

In December 2016, Sears Canada announced plans to add grocery sections in three-to-five remodelled stores in 2017. The selection would be primarily organic, with a focus on low cost and e-commerce.

=== Bankruptcy and liquidation ===
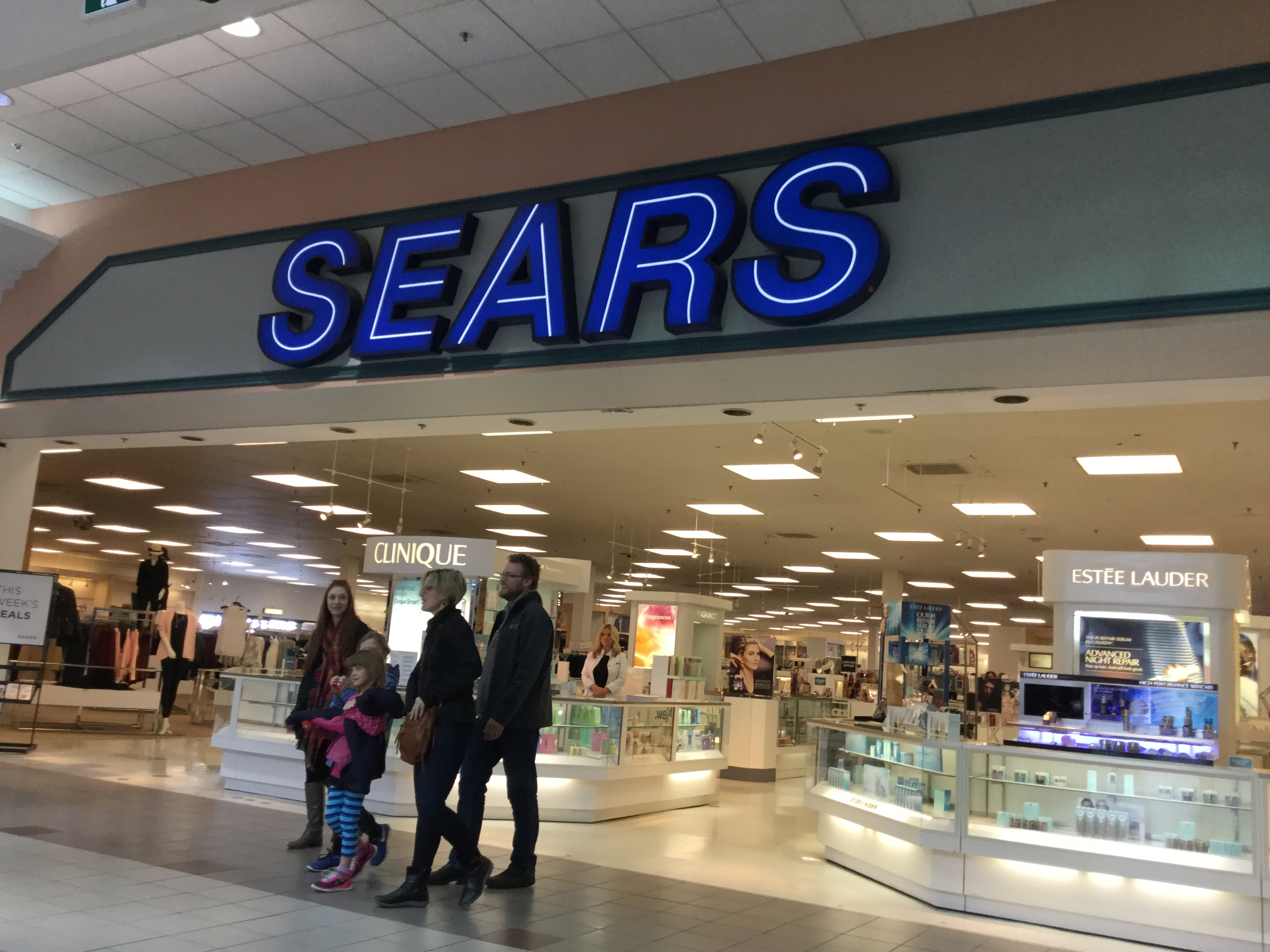
The Sears at the Medicine Hat Mall in Medicine Hat, Alberta in 2017, months before liquidation

On June 13, 2017, citing "material uncertainties" over whether the company would have enough cash flow to meet its financial obligations over the next year, and "significant doubt as to the company's ability to continue as a going concern", Sears Canada announced that it had hired advisors to explore a potential restructuring or sale of the company. On June 22, 2017, Sears Canada received court protection from its creditors and announced that it had commenced court-supervised restructuring proceedings under the Companies' Creditors Arrangement Act, which would include closure a total of 59 stores (including 20 department stores, 15 Sears Home stores, 14 Sears Hometown stores, and 10 Sears Outlet stores) over an unspecified time period. These closures resulted in the loss of 2,900 employees. The company had also been reducing its product assortment to have a larger focus on fashion and home decor, downplaying its automotive, electronics, and tool businesses. The company stated that its new strategies and positioning were "starting to resonate with consumers", citing increasing same-store sales over the previous two quarters.

On July 18, 2017, Sears Canada received court approval to begin liquidating the inventory of the 59 closing locations on July 21, 2017, appointing Gordon Brothers and Merchant Retail Solutions to manage the liquidation of the department and Sears Home stores. Per the formal plan submitted in court documents, the terms "bankruptcy", "going out of business", or "liquidation" could not be used to promote these sales. Liquidation of the Hometown stores was managed by their franchisees. The move to close Hometown stores was criticized by several of their owners. The owners of five Alberta dealers reported that most of their locations were still profitable, and stated that due to the restructuring proceedings, they were losing compensation prescribed by their contracts with Sears if the retailer terminates them early.

Amid the restructuring, Sears Canada was criticized for its treatment of the laid-off employees, including that the company planned to issue a total of $7.6 million in retention bonuses to 43 executives and senior managers, and $1.6 million to senior employees at stores that are closing, but did not plan to offer severance pay to the laid-off employees. These concerns resulted in calls over social media to boycott the company. Sears Canada defended the decisions, stating that the retention payments were a common practice during these processes, intended to maintain the morale of senior staff as they wind down their stores and that key executives remain with the company through the insolvency process.

On August 15, 2017, the company announced that it planned to seek authorization from the Ontario Superior Court to siphon $500,000 from the retention bonuses into an "Employee Hardship Fund", which would be available to eligible employees. A company representative stated that Sears Canada "shares everyone's concerns about the plight faced by some of its former employees, and is glad to see a solution, pending court approval, that can at least help those most in need." The Globe and Mail noted that this arrangement was not a true substitute to severance pay, as affected employees "would have collected far more had Sears followed the typical path of giving a few weeks of pay per year of service for terminated employees."

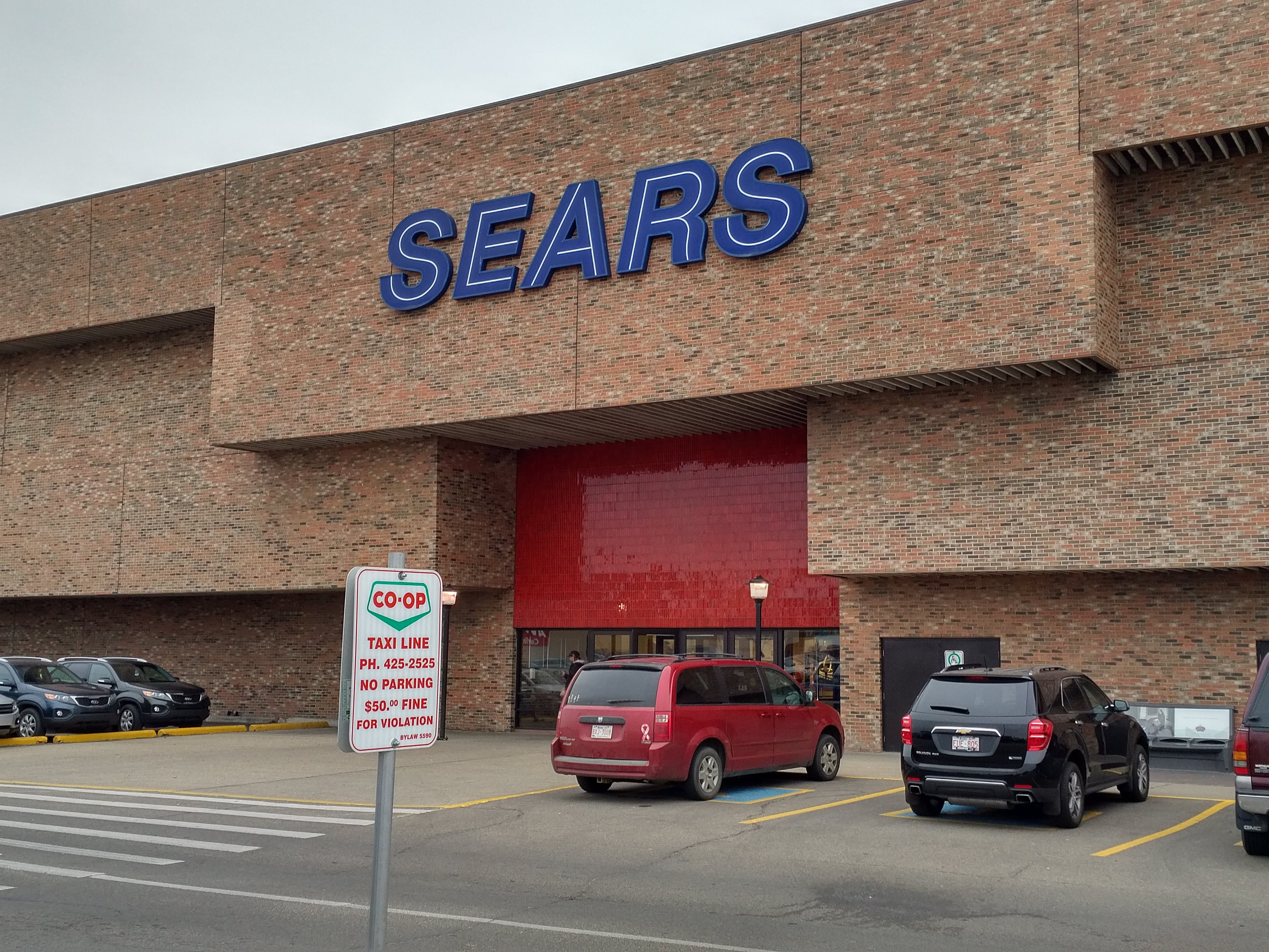
A former Sears location at the Kingsway Mall in Edmonton, Alberta in October 2017, before liquidation

On October 2, 2017, Sears Canada announced its intent to seek extended bankruptcy protection as well as the closure of 11 additional stores.

A management group led by the company's executive chairman Brandon Stranzl had hoped to take over the retailer, but that attempt failed. "Following exhaustive efforts, no viable transaction for the company to continue as a going concern was received," Sears Canada announced on October 10, 2017. On the same day, the company stated that it was seeking court approval to liquidate the approximately 130 remaining locations and assets. Sears Canada received Ontario Superior Court approval on October 13, 2017, since there was no viable buyer for the operation; the liquidation process was expected to be completed in 10 to 14 weeks after the beginning of liquidation on October 19, 2017.

The closure of all operations led to a loss of nearly 12,000 jobs, of which roughly three-quarters were part-time employees. Since the pension plan was underfunded by nearly $270 million, the annual benefits received by 17,000 pension plan members was likely to be reduced. In an attempt to moderate the hardship for retirees, a judge had previously ordered payments to other Sears creditors frozen until the pension issue was resolved. While Ontario offers a plan to financially aid such pensioners under its Pension Benefits Act, no other province has a similar program.

== Store formats and channels ==
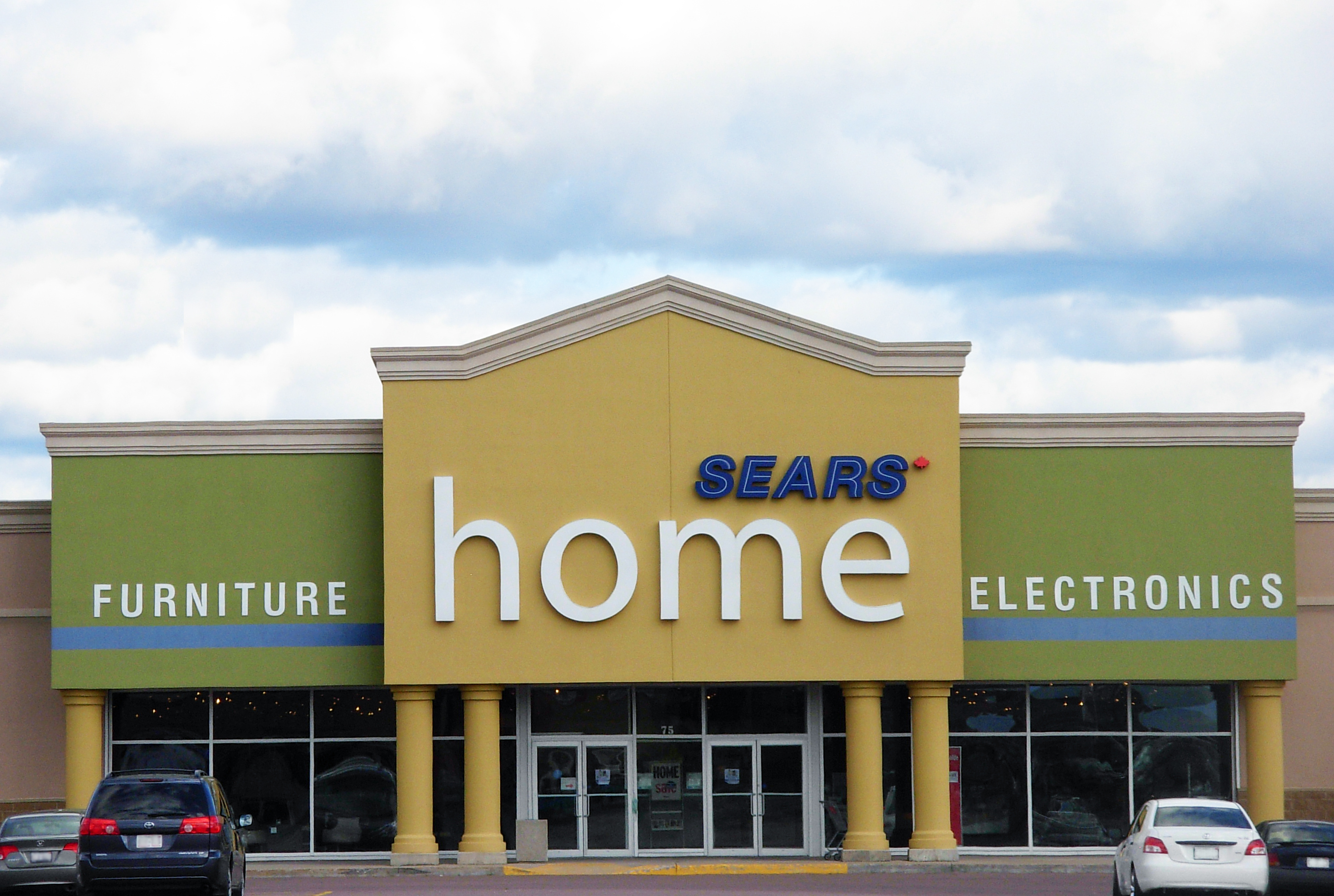
A former Sears Home location in Moncton, New Brunswick

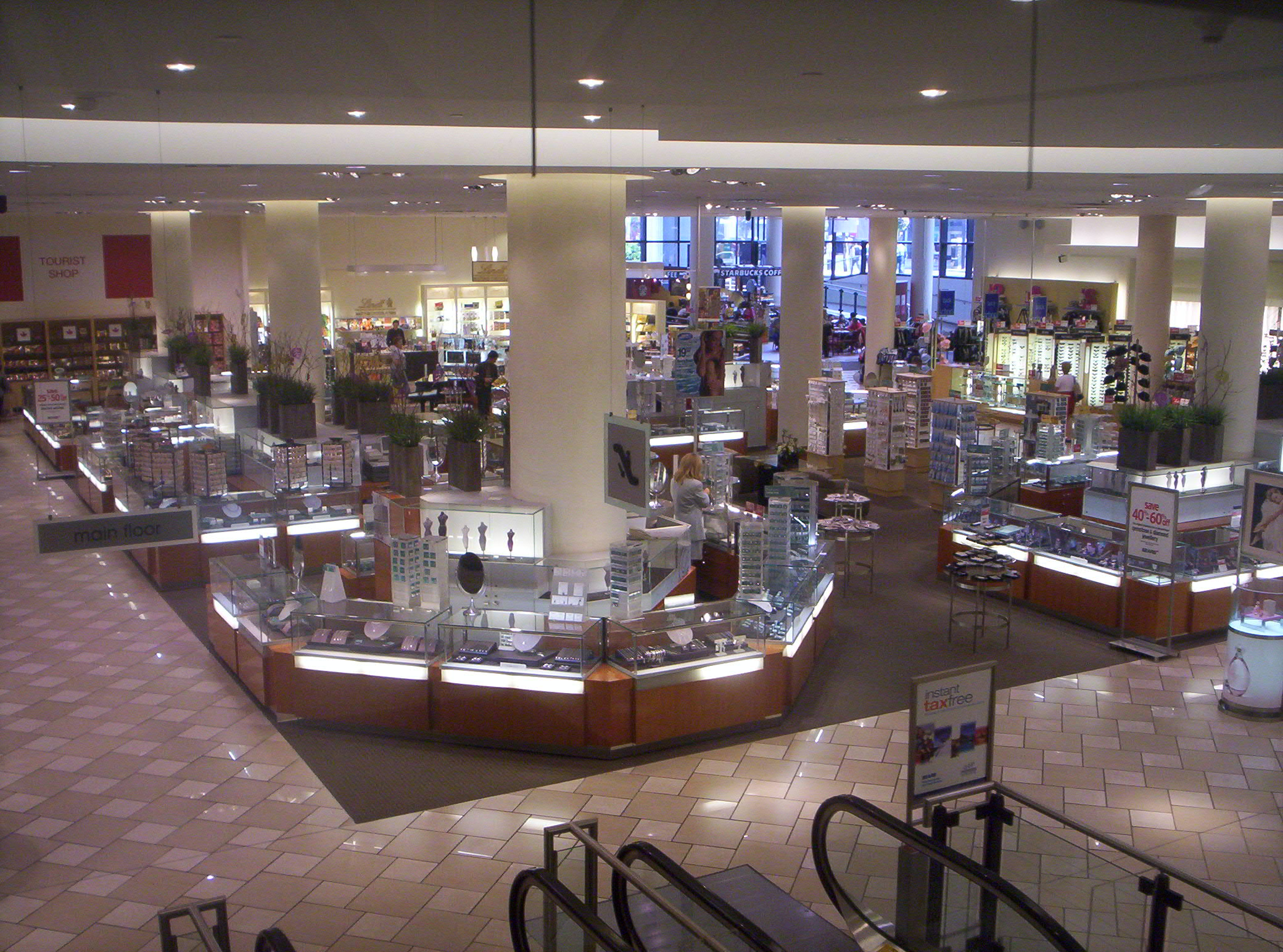
Interior of the Eatons Pacific Centre store, a former T. Eaton Co. (Eaton's) location

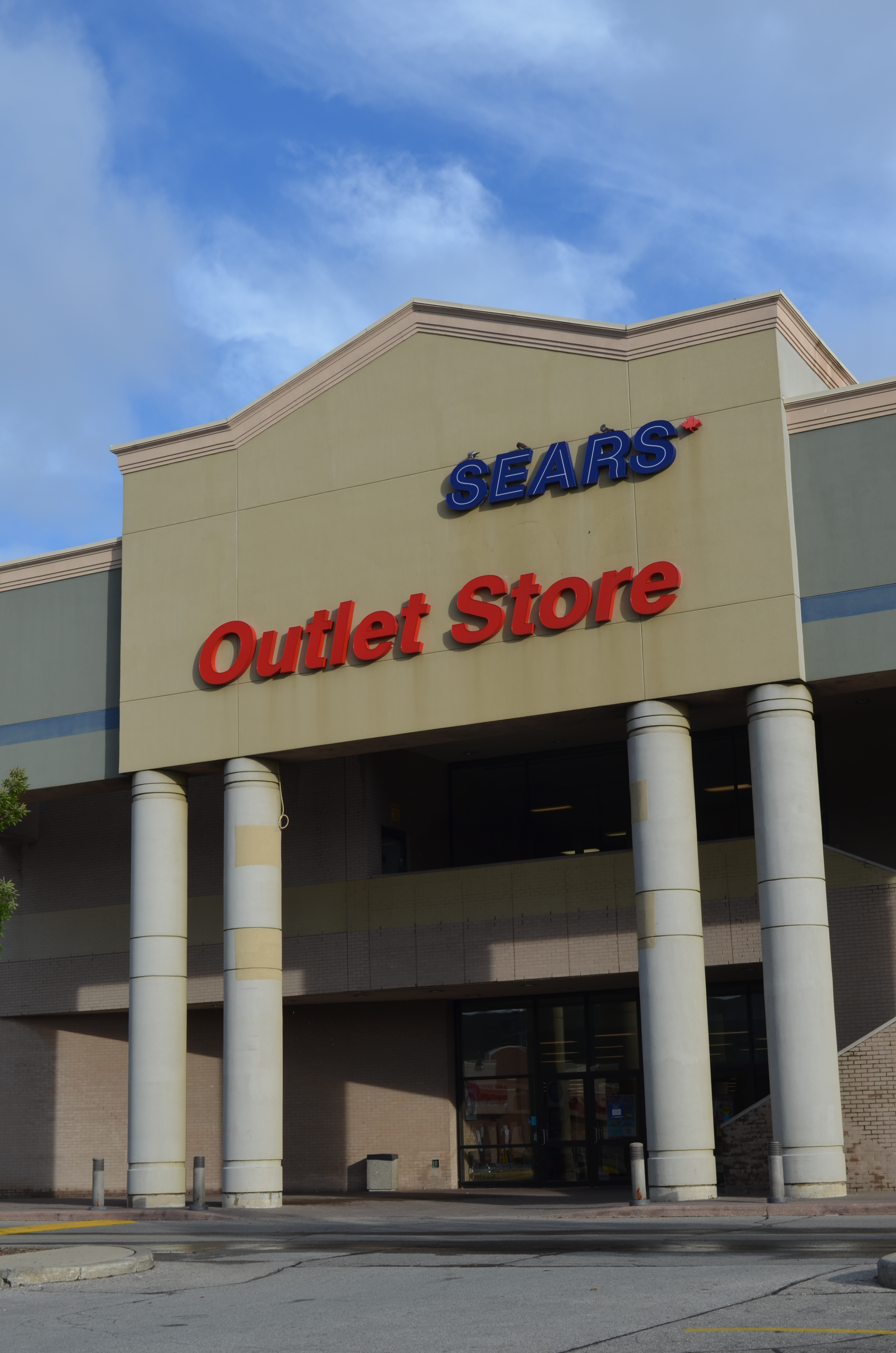
A former Sears outlet store in Markham, Ontario

=== Full-line stores ===
Simpsons-Sears began operating full-line (department) stores in 1953. Internally, these have been classified by size, volume, and the extent of merchandise selection. In the early decades, classifications were based on a letter designation, mirroring founding American parent, Sears, Roebuck, and Co.: 'A' Stores were large full-line stores, 'B' stores were smaller full-lines, serving more-mid-sized markets, while 'D' stores were early stores serving small markets, normally offering mostly hard-line and home departments, with a catalogue desk. the 'D' stores were phased out in the early 1960s. Small stores, denoted 'S.S.' and serving similar markets to the original 'D' Stores, were introduced in the 1980s. In latter decades, stores have been classified by more descriptive terms, such as 'Select,' 'Core', and 'Small.' When Hometown Dealer Stores were introduced, they mirrored the assortments of the early 'D' stores.

=== Clearance centres and outlet stores ===
In 1971, adjacent to its new Kenmore Catalogue Service Centre in Toronto, Simpsons-Sears opened its first new concept "Clearance Centre", to assist in the rotation of its off-season and marked down catalogue merchandise. The concept was eventually expanded nationwide, offering consumers an off-priced selection of in-house and brand name products. In the 2000s, these stores were renamed "Outlet Stores" to reflect a broader assortment as well as channel-specific merchandise. Sears full-line stores in some markets were converted to this format in 2014. As of Fall 2016, Sears Canada operated 17 outlet locations. In June 2017 Sears announced 10 remaining outlet stores would also close.

=== Hometown (Dealer) stores ===
In 1994, Sears Canada opened its first Hometown Dealer Store in Pembroke, Ontario. The "Hometown Stores". were designed to serve smaller-sized markets and bring a displayed selection of big ticket merchandise, along with the convenience of a local Catalogue counter, to consumers not near larger Sears stores nor other large retail firms. Stores of this format were operated predominantly in partnership with local community franchisers.

=== Home stores ===
In 1995, Sears Canada launched a chain of specialty stores called "Sears Whole Home" in order to better showcase its home decor offerings. Furniture stores were located in power centres. they were renamed "Sears Furniture and Appliances" stores in 1999, to reflect the addition of major appliances. In 2003, the Furniture and Appliances stores were renamed "Sears Home" stores. This change was intended to reflect their broader appeal for customers seeking a one-stop experience for re-making their home decor. The stores' product line was expanded to include home-installed products and services such as floor coverings, customer drapery, and other installed home related products in many locations.

In 2004, new off-mall specialty formats were introduced, including four Sears Appliances and Mattresses stores and two Sears (Floor) Coverings Stores.

=== Online shopping ===
In August 1996, Sears Canada's website, www.sears.ca was launched. This site allowed customers to order much of the same merchandise that they found in Sears Canada catalogues.

In 2016, the company launched Initium, an initiative to overhaul existing legacy platforms into a new cohesive, functional, adaptable and user-friendly online retail enterprise for consumers. This new site provided for omni-channel availability of orders, integrated logistics and improved search and checkout experiences for customers. In a related move, Sears Canada entered into an agreement with CGI to support Sears strategy to reengineer its technology platforms, with the goal of reducing costs and improving efficiency. After October 19, 2017, the website was no longer available for online purchases and directed shoppers to the remaining stores undergoing liquidation, with a message of thanks to customers. Sears Canada website ceased operations after December 13, 2018, but their social media links with Twitter and Facebook can still be reached despite no activity since the retailer ceased operating.

Sears offered options for Canadian cross-border shoppers to purchase from the US site and pick up at the nearest US store. International delivery was not available to Canadians.

=== Corbeil Appliances ===
Founded in 1949, Corbeil Électrique Inc., better known as Corbeil Appliances, was acquired by Sears Canada in 2005. Corbeil had 26 locations in Quebec, but closed its four locations in Toronto and Ottawa. As a part of the bankruptcy protection process, Corbeil was sold to Am-Cam Électroménagers Inc., headquartered in Montreal, for an undisclosed amount. Am-Cam is the parent company of Distinctive Appliances and the sale was completed in December 2017.

== Brand identity ==
=== Logo ===
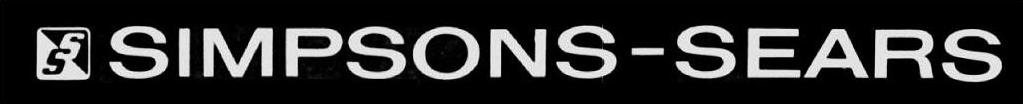
Simpsons-Sears logo, used from 1963–1965

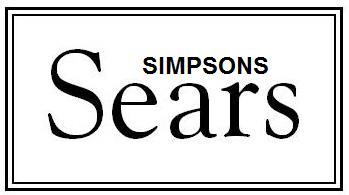
Simpsons-Sears logo, used from 1965–1972

Simpsons-Sears used the Sears banner logo from 1972–1984.

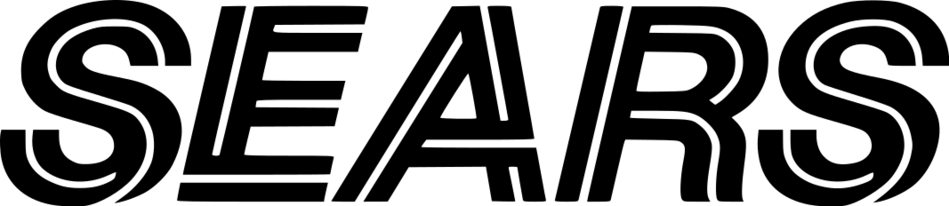
Sears Canada logo, used from 1984–1994

Sears Canada logo, used from 1994–2000

Sears Canada logo, used from 2000–2004; from this logo onwards, a maple leaf is added at the end of the wordmark to differentiate the Canadian stores from the American chain

Sears Canada logo from 2004–2011

Sears Canada logo, used from 2011–2016, this variant removes the red stripe that was seen underneath the previous logo

Final Sears Canada logo, used from 2016–2018

== Corporate affairs ==
The headquarters were in Downtown Toronto, inside an eight-story complex which was formerly the home to Sears' flagship location within the Toronto Eaton Centre until 2014. The headquarters moved there from 222 Jarvis Street after that building was sold in 2007 to the Ontario Realty Corporation and houses provincial government use since 2011. The lower four floors of the Eaton Centre location remained in use for retail, including a three-floor Nordstrom store from fall 2016 onwards, while the upper four floors continued as Sears Canada headquarters. This headquarters remained active until the retailer completed liquidation on January 14, 2018.

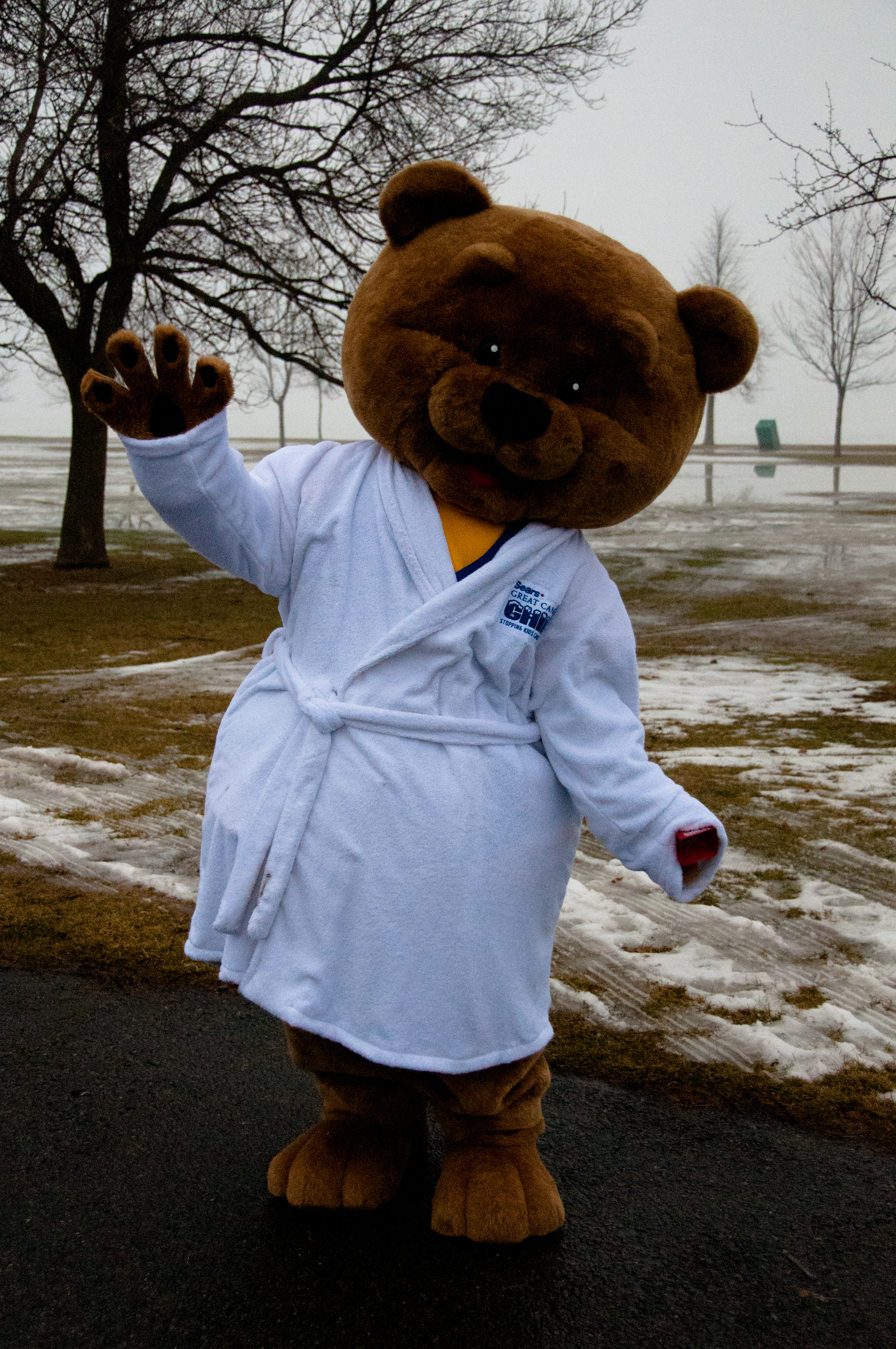
Ben, mascot for the Sears Canada Charitable Foundation, and its initiatives to support the development of Canadian youth. Pictured in Ottawa, Ontario.

After closure of the stores and corporate head office, the board of directors remains active with four remaining members are responsible in divesting remaining real estate for the now defunct retailer.

== Sears house brands ==
Sears Canada and its predecessors were long been associated with its well-known house brands, each having a history of its own. For Canadian and overseas vendor suppliers, it maintained a Vendor Code of Conduct which, amongst other things, prohibits the use of child labour.

Among some of Sears house brands over time:

Craftsman was Sears' line of hardware, lawn and garden equipment, and work wear. In 2009, readers of Popular Mechanics named Craftsman their favourite brand of hand tools in their Reader's Choice Awards. The Craftsman trademark was registered by Sears, Roebuck and Co. on May 20, 1927. Arthur Barrows, head of the company's hardware department, liked the name Craftsman and reportedly bought the rights to use it from the Marion-Craftsman Tool Company for $500. The line has been carried in Canada since Simpsons-Sears began operating in 1953, first alongside such Simpson's hardware brands as Beaver.

Sears tool line, like many of its other product lines, used a "good, better, best" pricing structure, with the Craftsman brand as the middle tier and Craftsman Professional or Craftsman Industrial as the highest tier. The lower, value-priced tier was branded Sears. The "Dunlap" name was also used for from the late 1930s until the late 1950s. The Sears tool line was discontinued in the late 1980s and replaced by the "Companion" tool line. The Companion tool line was discontinued and replaced by the "Evolv'" tool line in 2008, with a focus on homeowners and do-it-yourselfers.

Kenmore was Sears Canada's primary line of household appliances. The first Kenmore branded product was a washing machine marketed by Sears, Roebuck and Co. in 1927. The first Kenmore vacuum cleaners were sold in the U.S. in 1932. Simpsons-Sears began selling the Kenmore line in Canada in 1953. Kenmore's upscale line of appliances is known as the Elite line. Kenmore also has a professional line of appliances called Kenmore Pro. In the 1960s and 1970s, many housewares and personal electrics in the line were branded “Lady Kenmore” but its use was discontinued with the rise of sexism sensitivities.

Silvertone was the brand name used by Sears, Roebuck and Co. for its line of sound, radio, stereo and home entertainment equipment from 1915 to 1972 and by Simpsons-Sears in Canada from 1953 to 1972. Probably best known for the line of inexpensive guitars, the brand became popular with novice musicians. Jerry Garcia, Chet Atkins, Bob Dylan, John Fogerty, Jack White, Mark Knopfler, and Brad Paisley had a Silvertone for their first electric, bass, or acoustic guitar. The Canadian band Chad Allan and The Silvertones, which became The Guess Who, took its name from this line of instruments. Pete Townshend would employ them in live performance with The Who for the purposes of smashing them. The name was placed on guitars from several different manufacturers over the years, including Danelectro, National, Harmony, Kay, and Teisco. The guitars, especially the 1960s models, are prized by collectors.

Coldspot was a Sears brand that existed from 1928 to 1976. The brand was created for a line of refrigerators. Other products sold under the Coldspot brand included freezers, dehumidifiers, and window air conditioning units. Sears, Roebuck had supplied this brand to Eaton's for distribution in Canada, but the line switched it to Simpsons-Sears upon its founding.

Jessica was Sears Canada's primary private label brand of women's apparel and accessories, catering to the modern woman. It was introduced in 1987 and was the top-selling ladies' fashion label in Canada. The brand was later renamed Jess near the closure of the brand.

Attitude was a fashion-forward ladies' fashion collection appealing to fashion conscious women. It had been an Eaton's exclusive house brand and Sears continued the name. In 2010, when Canadian fashion designer Jay Manuel became its exclusive designer, the line became Attitude by Jay Manuel. Manuel also added a men's dresswear line to the collection. In 2013, Sears entered into a strategic alliance with the ALDO Group to design and manufacture Sears entire line of Attitude and Nevada footwear for men and women.

'Nevada was Sears Canada's main line of denim and casual wear for both children and adults. Introduced along with a revamp of apparel house brands in 1987. It followed in the footsteps of another long-popular but more utilitarian Sears jeans line, "Toughskins", which dominated in the 1970s. In 2013, Sears entered into a strategic alliance with Buffalo International Inc. to design and manufacture Sears' entire line of Nevada denim-based apparel (cited above).

In 2016, with the rollout of the Sears 2.0 concept, Sears Canada amalgamated most of its house brands into the Sears Woman, Sears Man, Sears Kids and Sears Home labels.

In 2017, Canadian Tire agreed to acquire rights to the Viking appliance brand, however Viking Range, LLC purchased the rights in January 2018. Indigo Books and Music acquired the Calgary Distribution Centre and Subsidiary SLH Transport was sold to Quebec-based C.A.T. Transport Inc.

== See also ==
- List of Canadian department stores
- Sears (Mexico)
- Merchandise Building
- Nordstrom Canada - entered into market and opened stores in former Sears Canada footprint beginning in 2014 and exited in 2023.
