= Sports Experts =

Canadian sporting goods retailer

Sports Experts Inc.
- Industry: Retail
- Founded: 1967
- Area served: Canada
- Owner: Canadian Tire
- Parent: Provigo (1981–1994); FGL Sports (1994–2011); Canadian Tire (2011–present)
- Website: sportsexperts.ca

Sports Experts Inc. is a major Canadian sports-retailer franchise primarily located in Quebec, Canada. It is part of FGL Sports (formerly The Forzani Group), itself part of the Canadian Tire group.

== History ==
Sports Experts was founded in 1967. It was purchased by Provigo in December 1980.

On February 5, 1985, Sports Experts, which at the time had 108 locations across Quebec and The Maritimes, merged with Toronto-based Collegiate Arlington Sports, a sporting-goods chain of 44 stores in Quebec, Manitoba, Ontario, Alberta and British Columbia. The merger went in effect in April 1985 and the combined company took on the name Sports Experts Inc. The Arlington locations initially continued under their namesake but had all been converted to the Sports Experts banner by 1986.

In 1994, Provigo sold Sports Experts to the Forzani Group. The Forzani Group has since been acquired by Canadian Tire in 2011.

As of 2021, the largest Sports Experts store is located at the Laurier Quebec shopping mall in Quebec City.

== See also ==
- Sport Chek, the Western Canada and Ontario sister brand to Sports Experts
- Intersport, a sister store to Sports Experts in Canada, Canadian licensee of the international marque
