= Upper Canada Mall =

Coordinates: 44.056073°N 79.48396°W

- Location: Newmarket, Ontario, Canada
- Address: 17600 Yonge Street
- Opened: 1974; 52 years ago
- Manager: Oxford Properties Group
- Owner: Oxford Properties Group
- Num. of stores: 250
- Num. of anchor tenants: 4 (as of Jan 2026)
- Floor area: 1,000,000 square feet (90,000 m^{2})
- Floors: 2

Upper Canada Mall is a shopping mall located in Newmarket, Ontario, Canada. The mall is situated on the northwest corner of the Davis Drive West and Yonge Street intersection, and is considered the 25th largest shopping mall in Canada. The mall is owned and operated by Oxford Properties, one of the largest shopping centre development companies in Canada. It opened in 1974, at which time its layout was a north-south arrangement with two sunken sitting areas surrounded by brick planters on the lower level.

== History ==
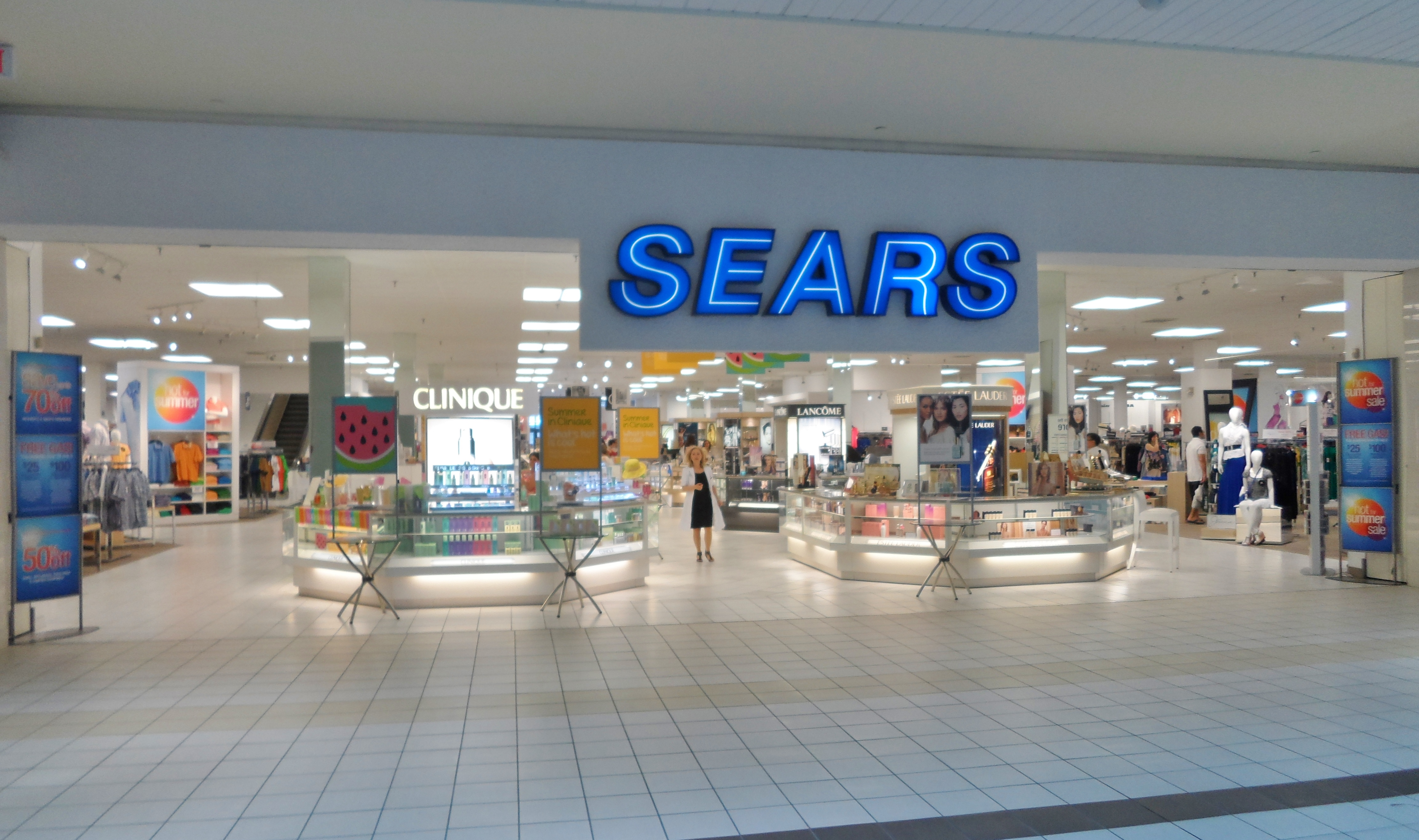
The former Sears at the Upper Canada Mall

Construction of the mall began in 1973. It opened in 1974 with 55 stores, two of which were the department store anchors Zellers (later Target) and Sears as well as a Dominion Supermarket,. A freestanding Sears Home Store was added to the mall property in 1998.

An Eaton's department store was added in the early 1990s, which later became a Hudson's Bay location, and closed in 2025. The original anchor Sears became an Urban Planet location and the space is now empty on the lower level, with Winners occupying the upper level.

A $60 million renovation was completed in 2008 adding 148,000 square feet (13 750 m²) to include a new 950-seat food court and 25 new fashion retailers including Forever 21 (closed 2020), Zara, Victoria's Secret, Hollister Co. (closed 2020), Browns, HMV (now Sunrise Records), Michael Kors, Apple Store, H&M, and Disney Store. During the expansion and redevelopment, the Toys "R" Us store expanded, and eventually became the largest Toys "R" Us store in Canada. The Toys "R" Us closed permanently in 2026.

On September 7, 2018, the mall opened Market & Co, an area with restaurants and food stores, after renovating and converting the space previously occupied by Zellers and later by Target. Sport Chek moved to the space that was not used by the new Market and Co. Dollarama took over the previous Sport Chek location.

== See also ==
- Largest shopping malls in Canada
