= Cambridge Centre =

Shopping mall in Cambridge, Ontario

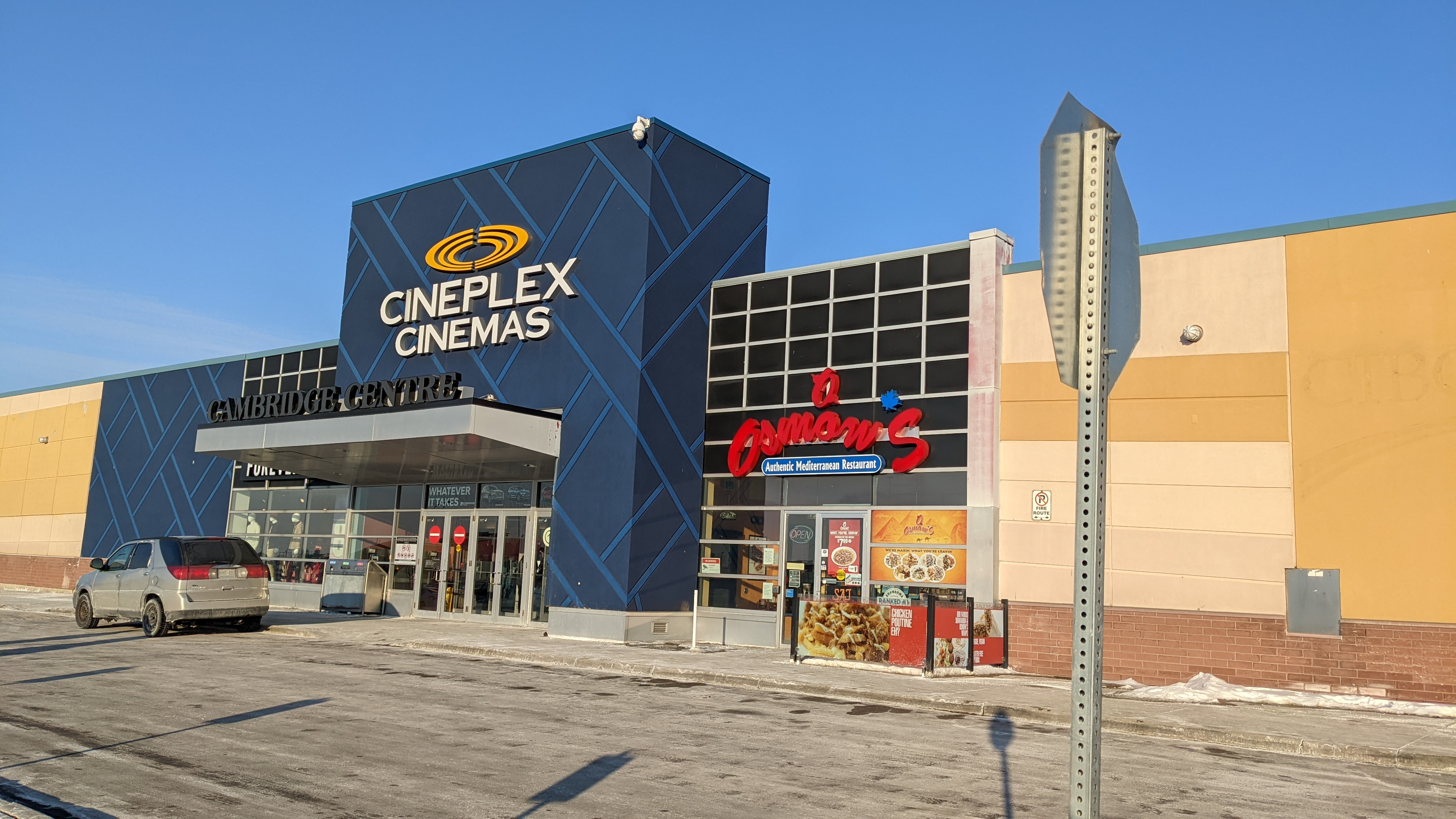
- Location: Cambridge, Ontario, Canada
- Coordinates: 43.393°N 80.320°W
- Address: 355 Hespeler Road
- Opened: 1973
- Manager: Morguard REIT
- Owner: Morguard
- Num. of stores: 137
- Num. of anchor tenants: 3 (1 open, 2 vacant)
- Floor area: 721,297 sq ft (67,010.7 m^{2})
- Floors: 1
- Website: cambridge-centre.com

Cambridge Centre is a shopping mall in Cambridge, Ontario, Canada. In the 1980s, Hespeler Road became the city's major commercial area, and is now known as the Highway 24/Hespeler Road Commercial District. The main anchor store was a Hudson's Bay, which closed in June 2025. Construction recently transformed the previous anchor store Target into part of the mall adding SportChek on the front side and Kingpin on the backside.

== History ==
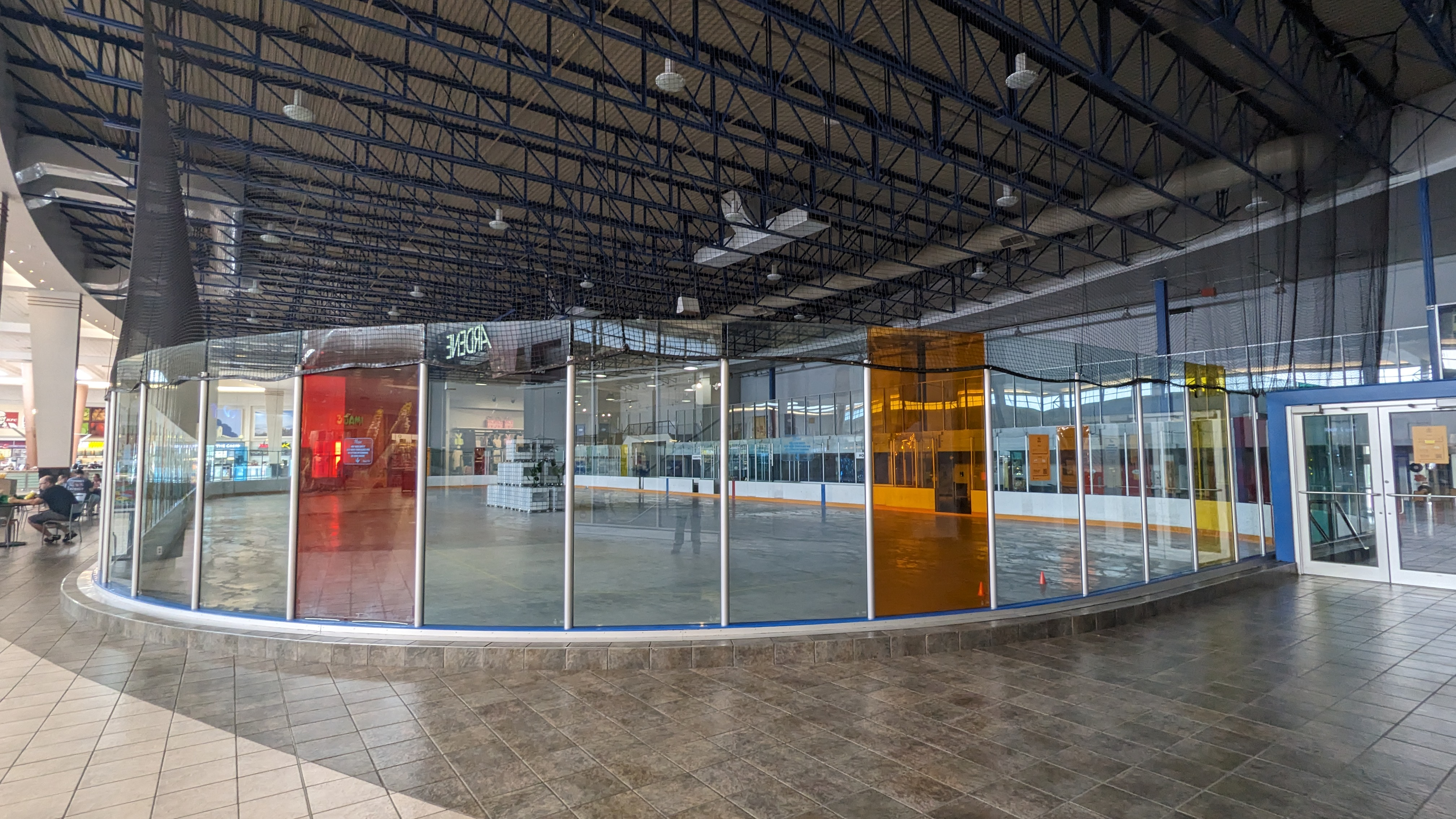
The NHL sized skating rink

Cambridge Centre opened in 1996, on a site previously occupied by the John Galt Centre which was constructed in 1973. A Right House department store had been located in the John Galt Centre. The original anchors of the mall were Miracle Mart (at the current Marks, Marshalls, King Pin & Sport Chek sites) and Miracle Food Mart (at the current Forever 21 store site). The 1996 conversion and expansion doubled the length of the main shopping corridor with a fountain and new food court joining the old with the new. The construction of a 2-storey The Bay Department Store as the north anchor, the area which previously housed Miracle Mart and The Right House was expanded and reconstructed for Zellers which became the south anchor, and the previous Sears Outlet Store was converted into a 10-screen Cambridge Centre Cinemas.

The mall underwent further expansion in 2002, which saw the construction of the 2 story Sears Department Store with many new stores, the relocation of the food court to the new wing and a National Hockey League-sized ice rink known as the Cambridge Ice Centre. The new wing shaped like a horseshoe connects to the main corridor and now the mall has reached its current size. Since 1996, $100 million has been invested in the enhancement of Cambridge Centre.

== Community involvement ==
Cambridge Centre supports charities in the Waterloo Region, with a Community Kiosk that is available free of charge to registered local charities.

== Anchors ==
- Indigo Books and Music
- Sport Chek
- Dollarama
- Marshalls
- Urban Behavior
- Ardene
- Galaxy Cinemas

=== Former anchors ===
- Target Canada (divided into multiple store which includes Sport Chek and Marshalls)
- Zellers (converted to Target Canada)
- Sears Canada (converted to Urban Behavior)
- Hudson's Bay

== See also ==
- CF Fairview Park Mall
- Conestoga Mall

== Transit terminal ==
Cambridge Centre Transit Terminal
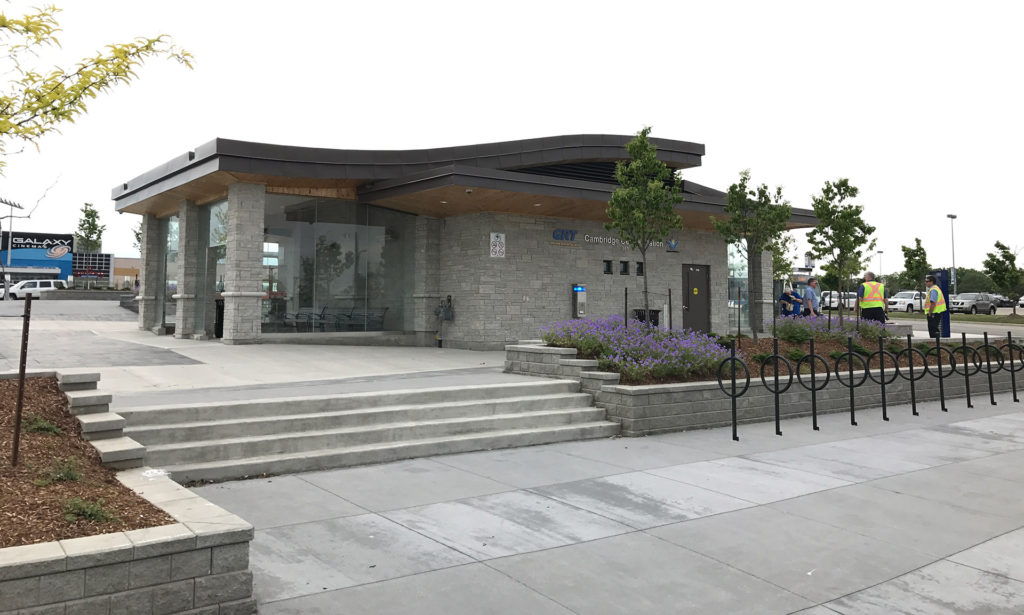

General information
- Coordinates: 43.3926°N 80.3225°W
- System: Grand River Transit transportation hub
- Owner: Grand River Transit
- Bus routes: 11
- Connections: GRT buses: 302 Bus; 203 iXpress Maple Grove; 50 Dundas; 51 Hespeler; 53 Franklin; 56 Dunbar; 58 Elgin North; 60 Burnett; 61 Fountain; 65 Saginaw; 67 Eagle-Pinebush

History
- Rebuilt: December 19, 2016
Location

Cambridge Centre is one of the principal interchange points for Grand River Transit buses in Cambridge. The terminal was moved to a new structure outside the front entrance of the mall, facing Hespeler Road, in December 2016. GRT's South Garage is also located nearby, on Conestoga Boulevard. The terminal had previously been located on the south side of the mall, on Dunbar Road.

Currently, as of May 10, the bus terminal is regularly serviced by 10 local bus routes and 1 rapid transit route, being the 302 ION bus.

Type	Routes
Rapid Transit	302 ION Bus
iXpress	203 iXpress Maple Grove
Local	50 Dundas-Myers 51 Hespler (both branches) 53 Franklin 56 Dunbar 58 Elgin North 60 Burnett 61 Fountain 65 Saginaw 67 Eagle-Pinebush
