= Carrefour Angrignon =

Shopping mall in Montreal, Quebec

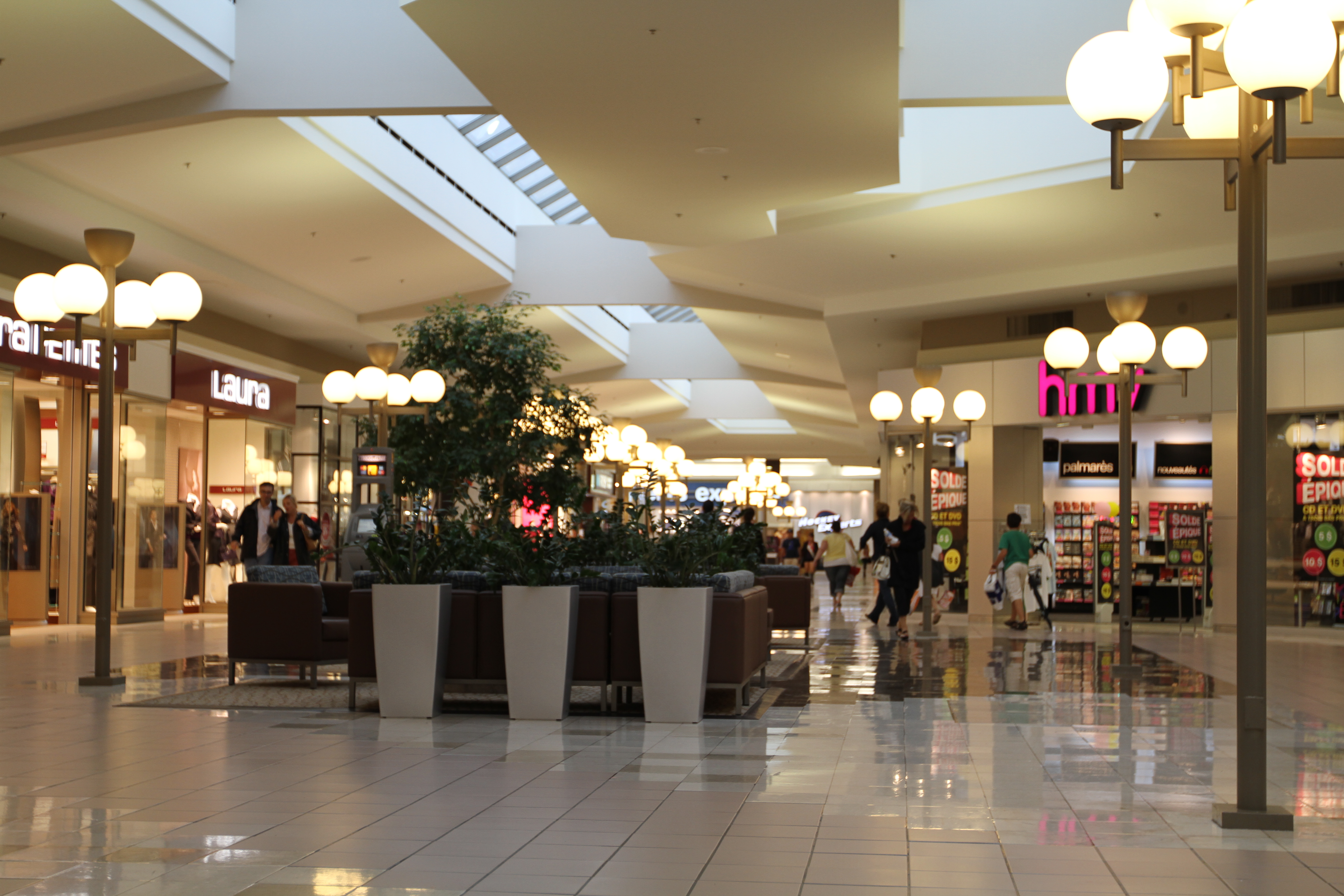
- Interior Carrefour Angrignon, Laura and HMV can be seen in the background
- Location: Montreal, Quebec
- Coordinates: 45°26′52.1″N 73°36′51.2″W
- Address: 7077 Newman Blvd; LaSalle, Quebec, Canada; H8N 0K1
- Opened: August 13, 1986
- Manager: Westcliff Management Ltd.
- Owner: Westcliff, Montez Core Income Fund
- Num. of stores: 150+
- Num. of anchor tenants: 6
- Floor area: 785,815 sq ft (73,000 m^{2}) (GLA)
- Floors: 1
- Parking: Outdoor
- Public transit: Angrignon station Terminus Angrignon
- Website: Official website

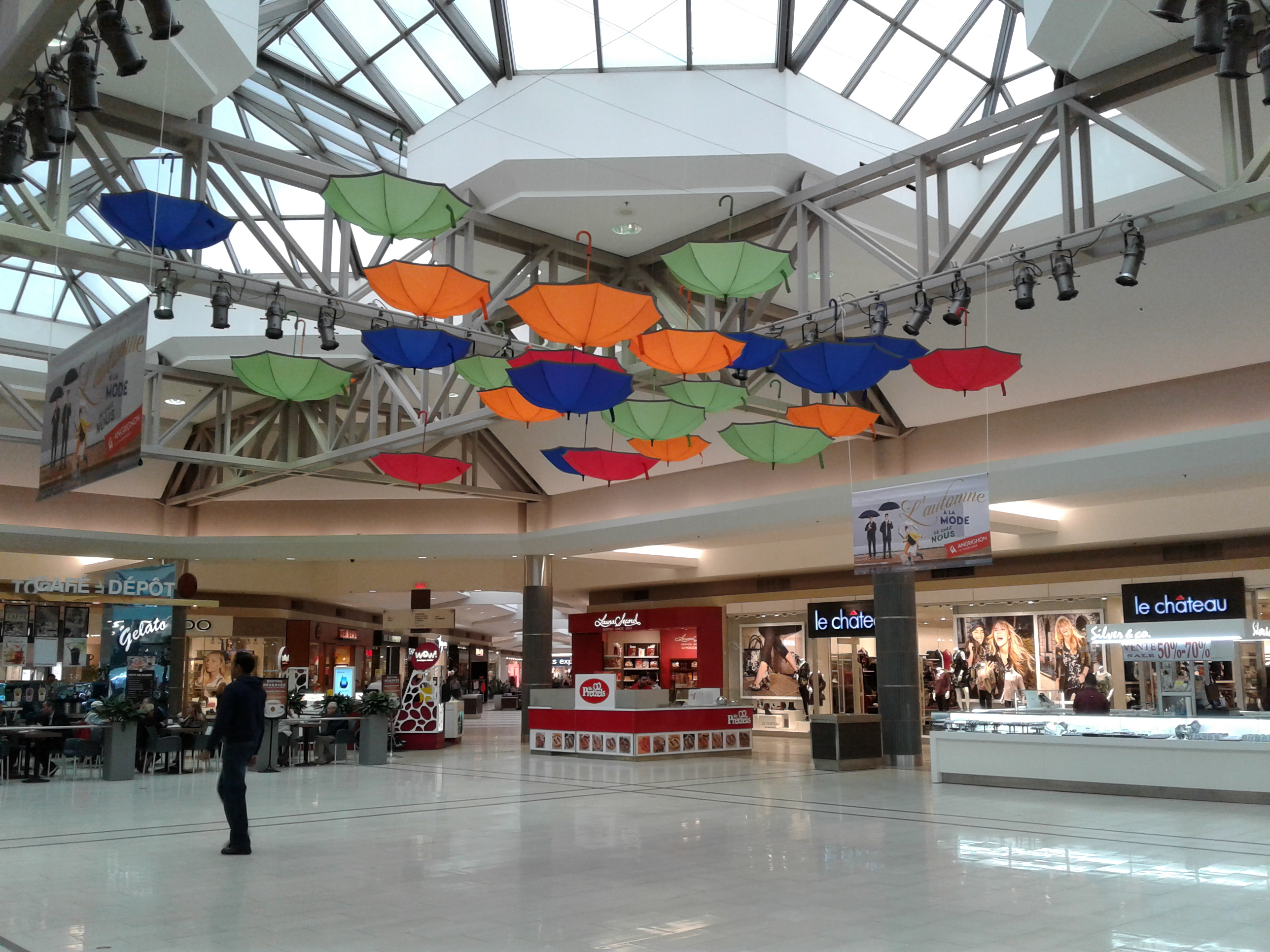
Atrium of the mall in 2017

Carrefour Angrignon (French pronunciation: [kaʁfuʁ ɑ̃ɡʁiɲɔ̃]) is a shopping mall in the Montreal borough of LaSalle, Quebec, Canada. Popular stores include Urban Behavior, Winners/HomeSense, Staples, Best Buy, Sports Experts/Atmosphere, and Famous Players. There is also a food court.

Built in 1986, this makes it one of the youngest indoor malls in the Montreal area. It is located on Newman Boulevard at the intersection with Angrignon Boulevard, within a walking distance from the Angrignon station of the Ville-Émard neighborhoud.

== History ==
Carrefour Angrignon opened in August 1986 with 200 stores and anchors from its debut were Sears, Zellers, Maxi, Eaton's and Pascal's.

The Pascal's hardware chain went bankrupt in 1991. The mall underwent changes in 1991, as the former Pascal's store became a car lot for a one-year period (Rallye Honda Lasalle) prior to being split in two to become a movie theatre. Cine Entreprise built the theatre before Cine Entreprise was itself sold to Famous Players. By 1995, Famous Players and Future Shop occupied the former Cine Entreprise space. After a succession of ownership changes, the movie theatre is now owned by Cineplex.

Eaton's closed on February 28, 1998. Eaton's former space is occupied by Staples and the duo Sports Experts and Atmosphere.

Future Shop moved to a new standalone location in 2004; it was demolished and rebuilt as a Best Buy store. Fortune Cinemas replaced the Famous Players location in 2006, only to be repurchased by Cineplex a few years later.

The Cumberland Drugs chain, which replaced Kanes Super Drug Mart in 1990, became an Essaim in 1997, changing to the current Pharmaprix by 2005.

Sears permanently closed on January 14, 2018. The 50% interest in the mall that was owned by Sears Canada was acquired by Montez Corporation. Sears' former location was subdivided in 2019 by L'Aubainerie and Ardene. They have since been joined by Winners, HomeSense, a Corbeil appliance store and a La Cage restaurant.

Target assumed the lease of the Zellers store on November 13, 2013. Target was closed in 2015. Hudson's Bay replaced the former Target store on August 24, 2018. It then closed on June 1, 2025, alongside all other Hudson's Bay locations. It is now an Urban Behavior store.

Maxi closed on February 7, 2026, leaving no original anchors remaining in the mall.

== Gallery ==
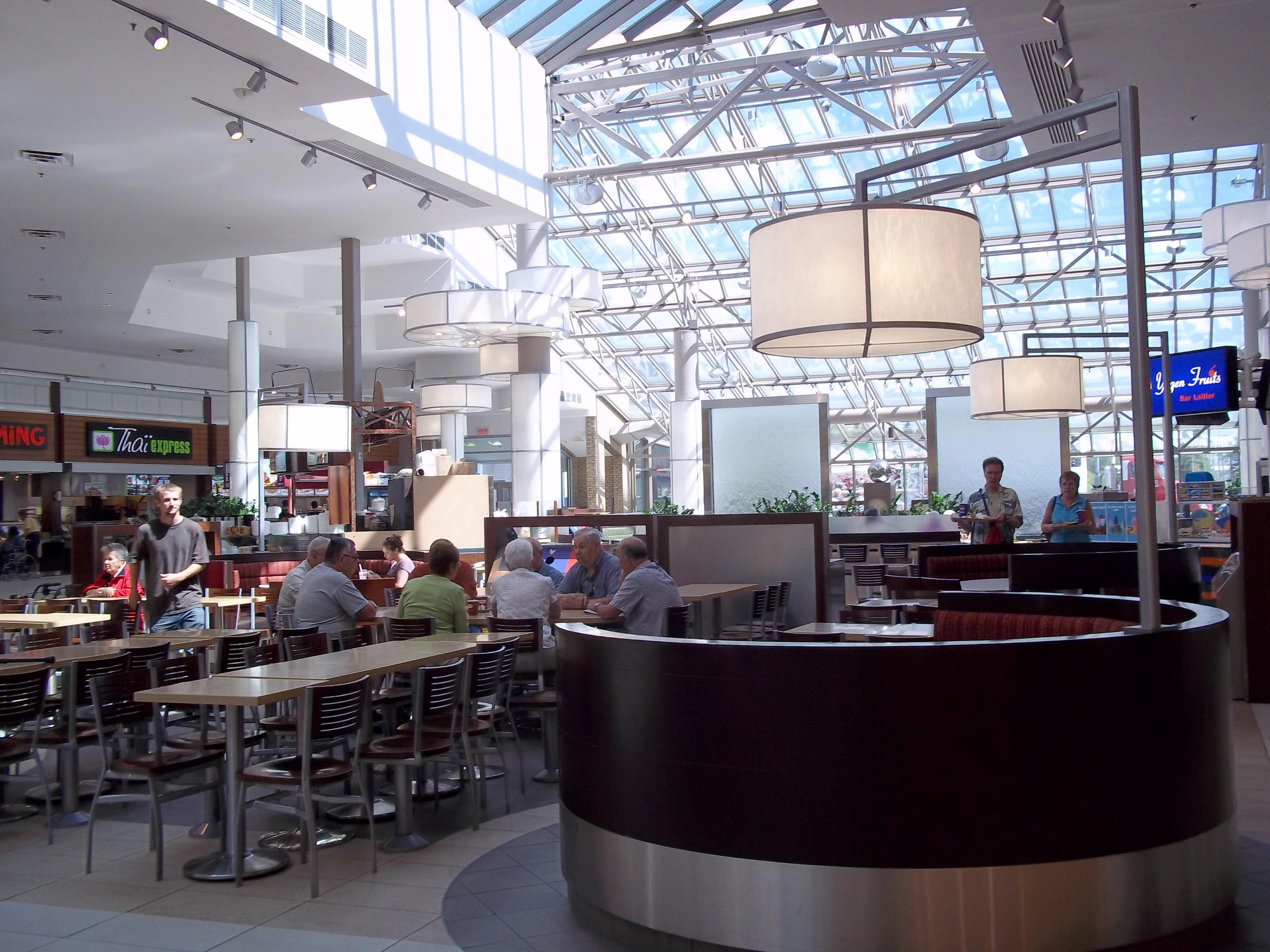
Carrefour Angrignon food court in 2011

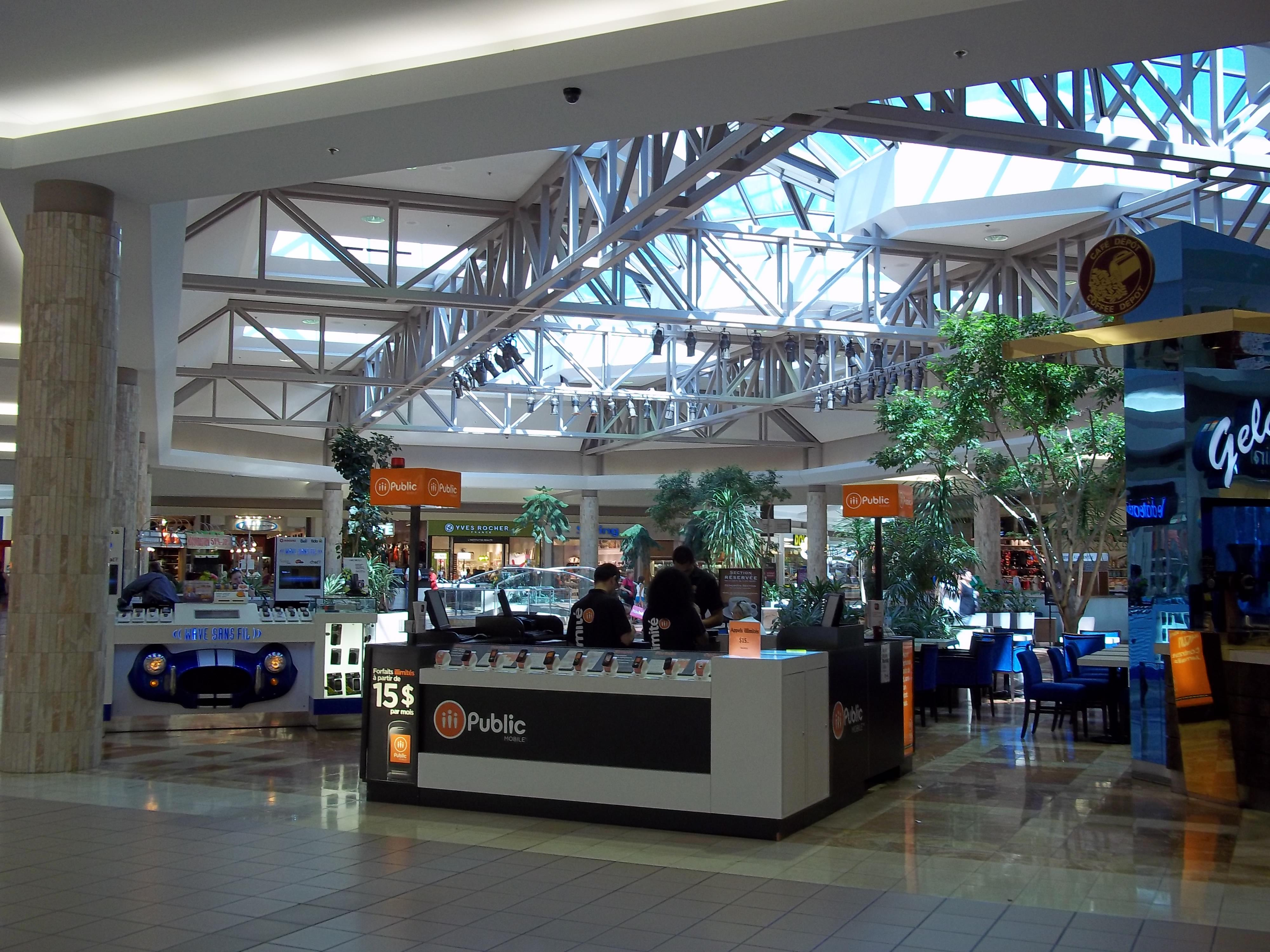
Kiosk and greenery inside the mall in 2011

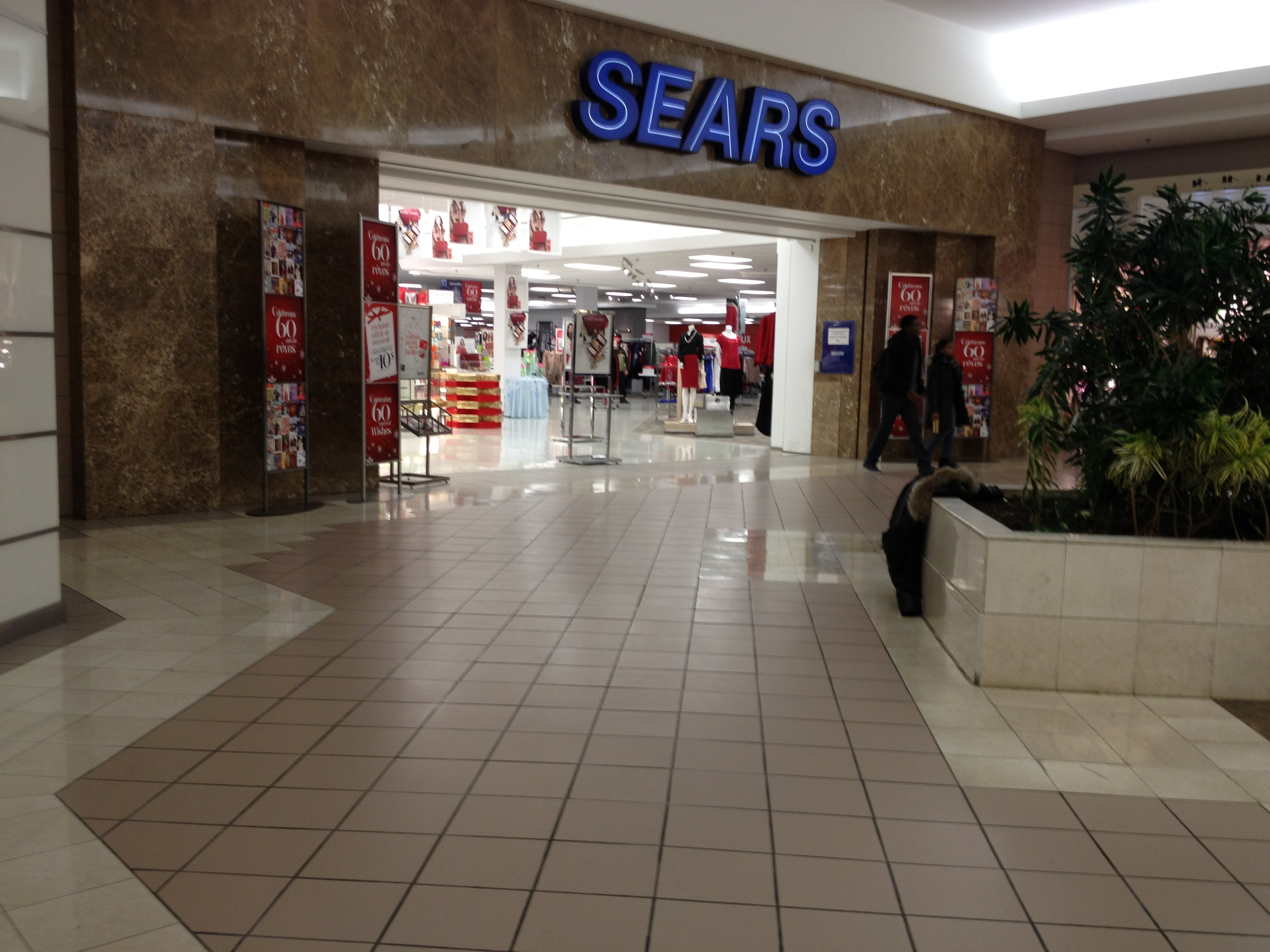
Former Sears Canada

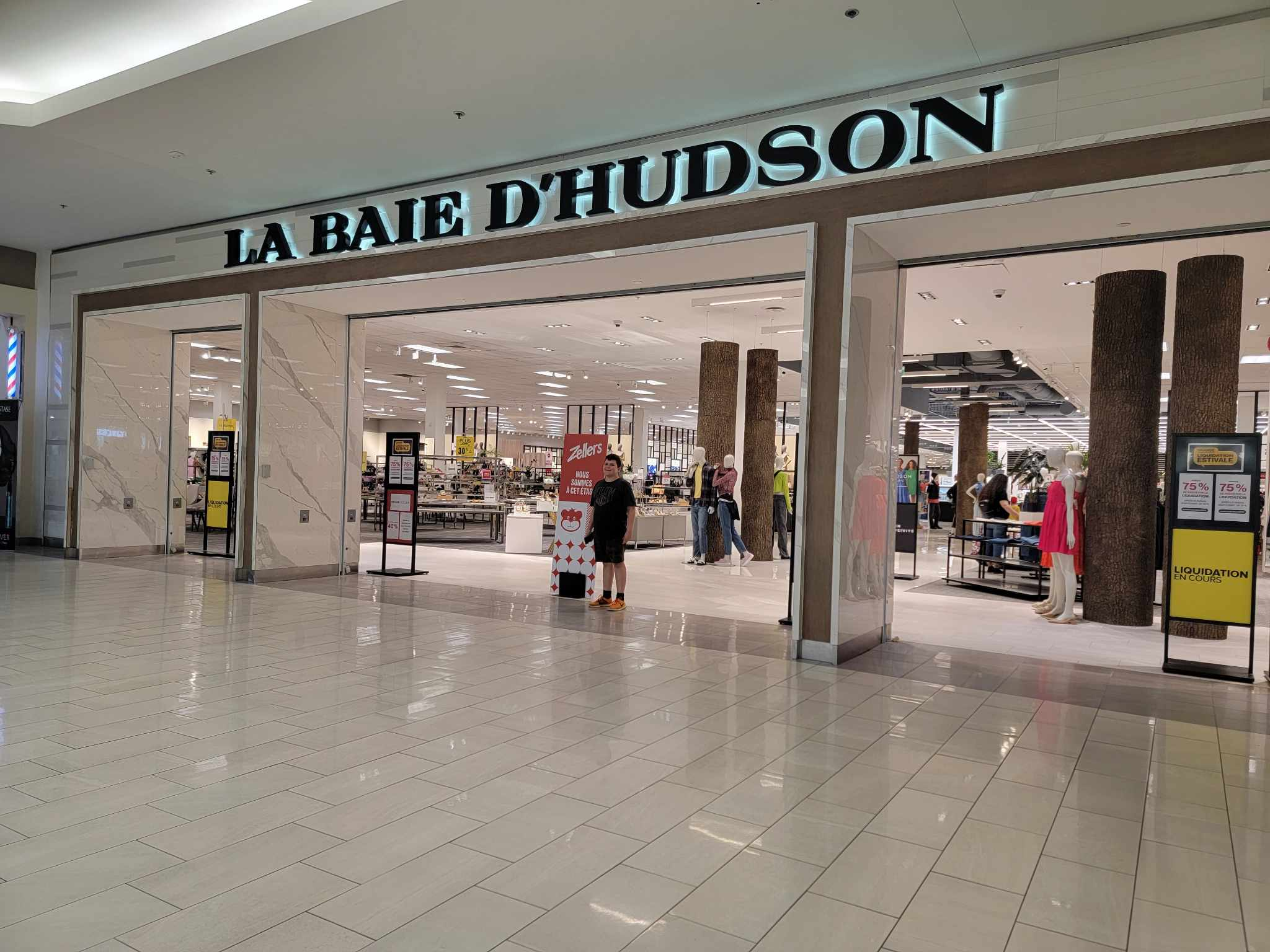
Former La Baie D'Hudson

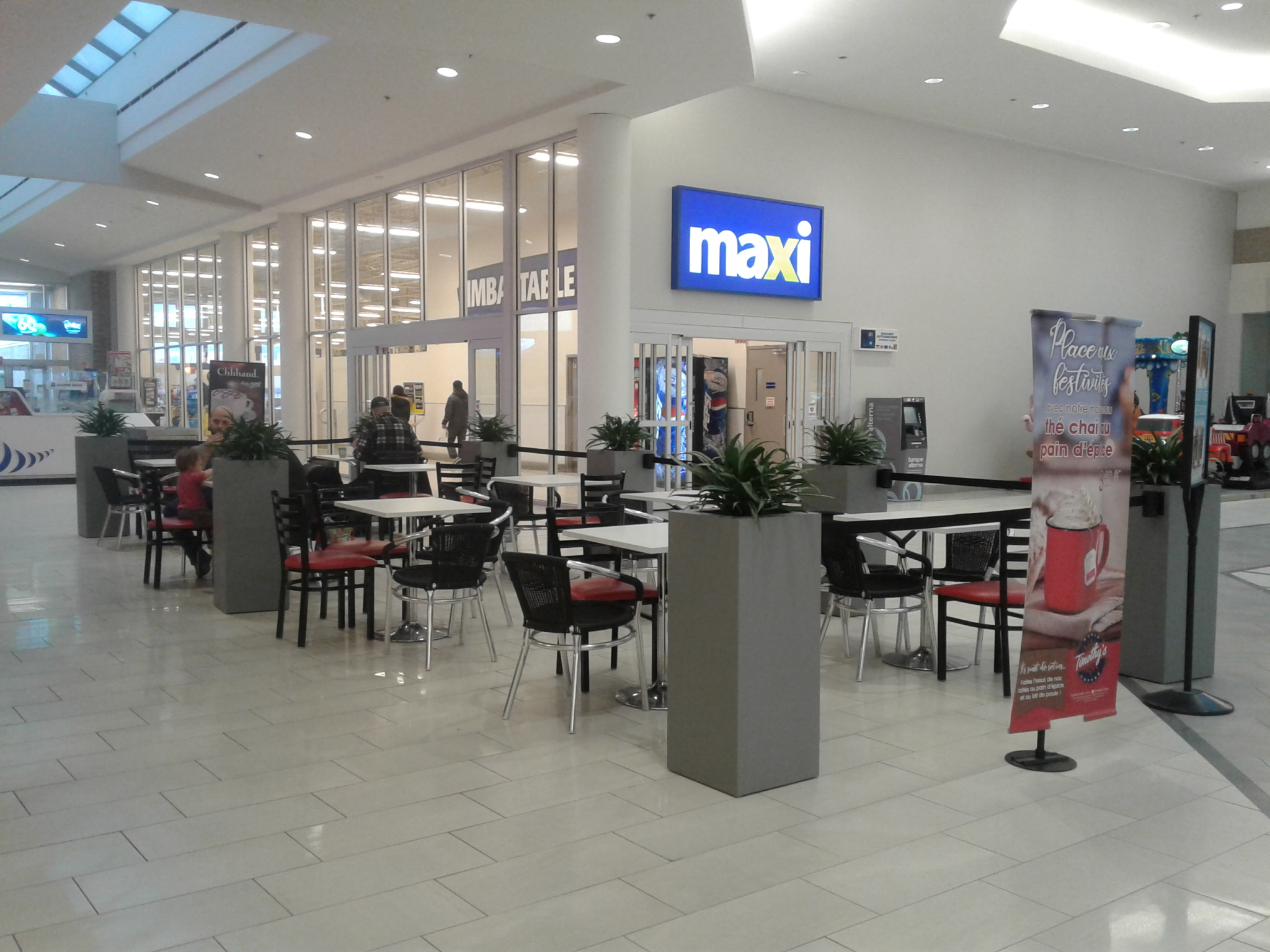
Former Maxi

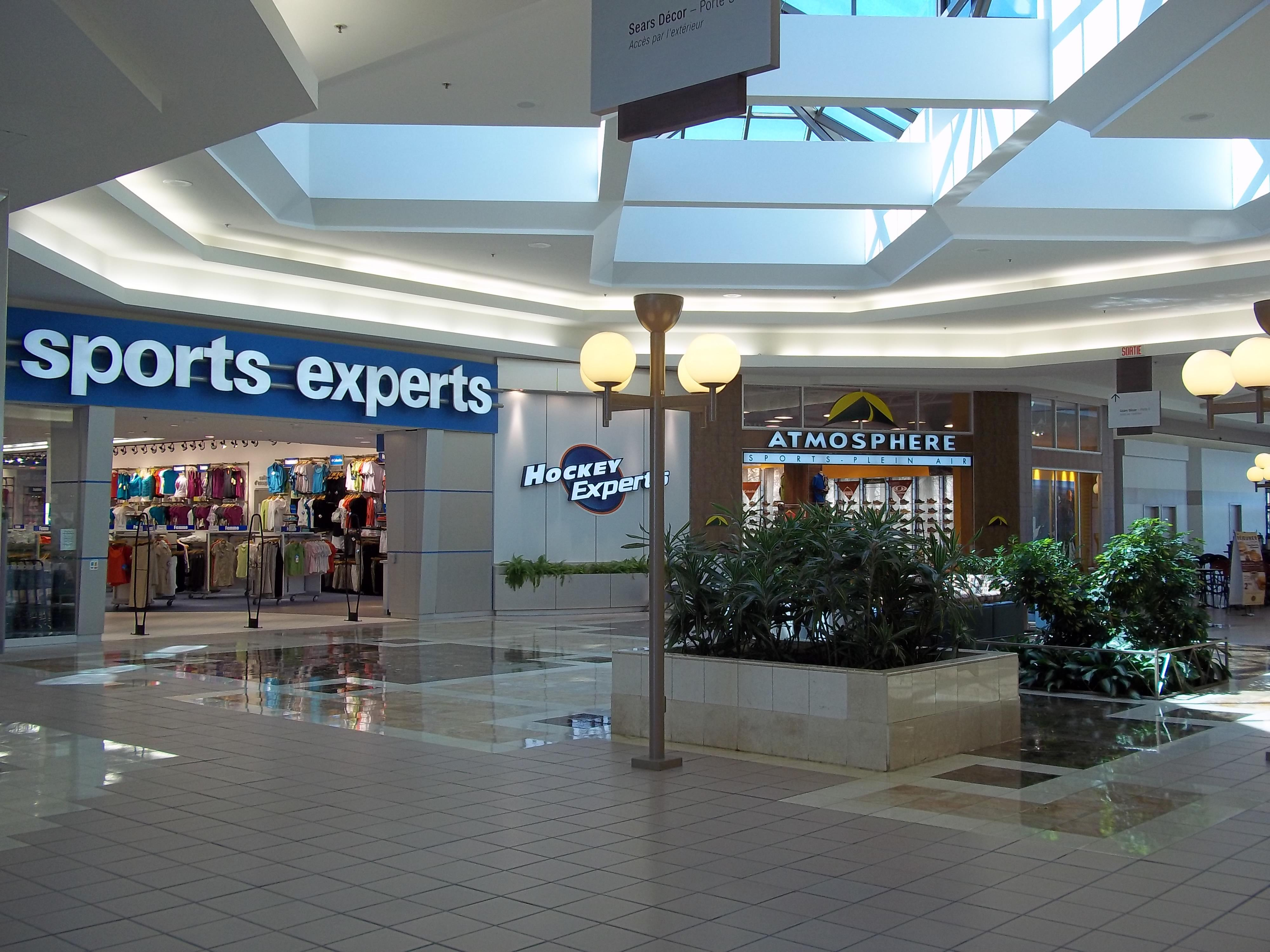
Sports Experts and Atmosphere

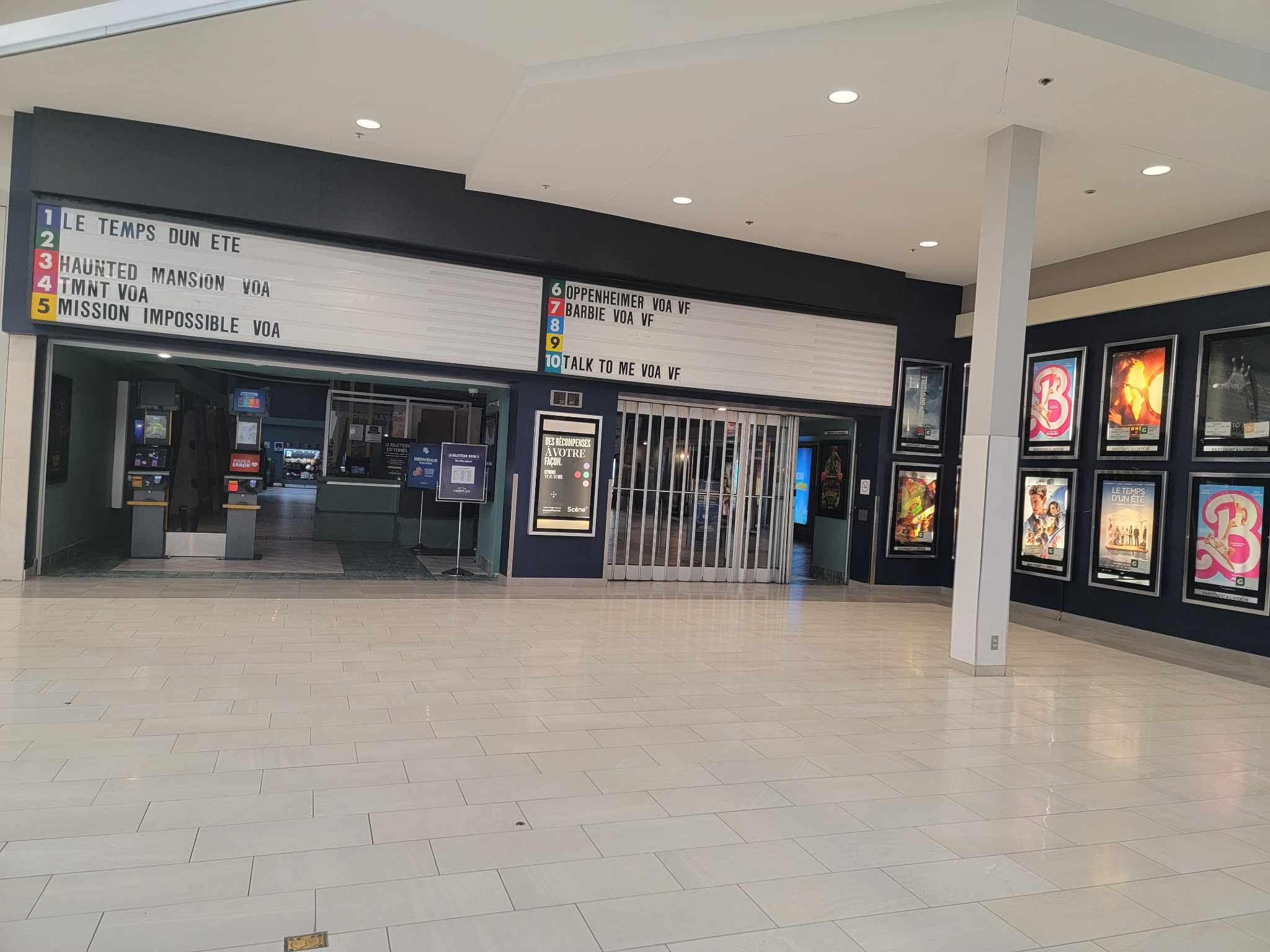
Famous Players theatre

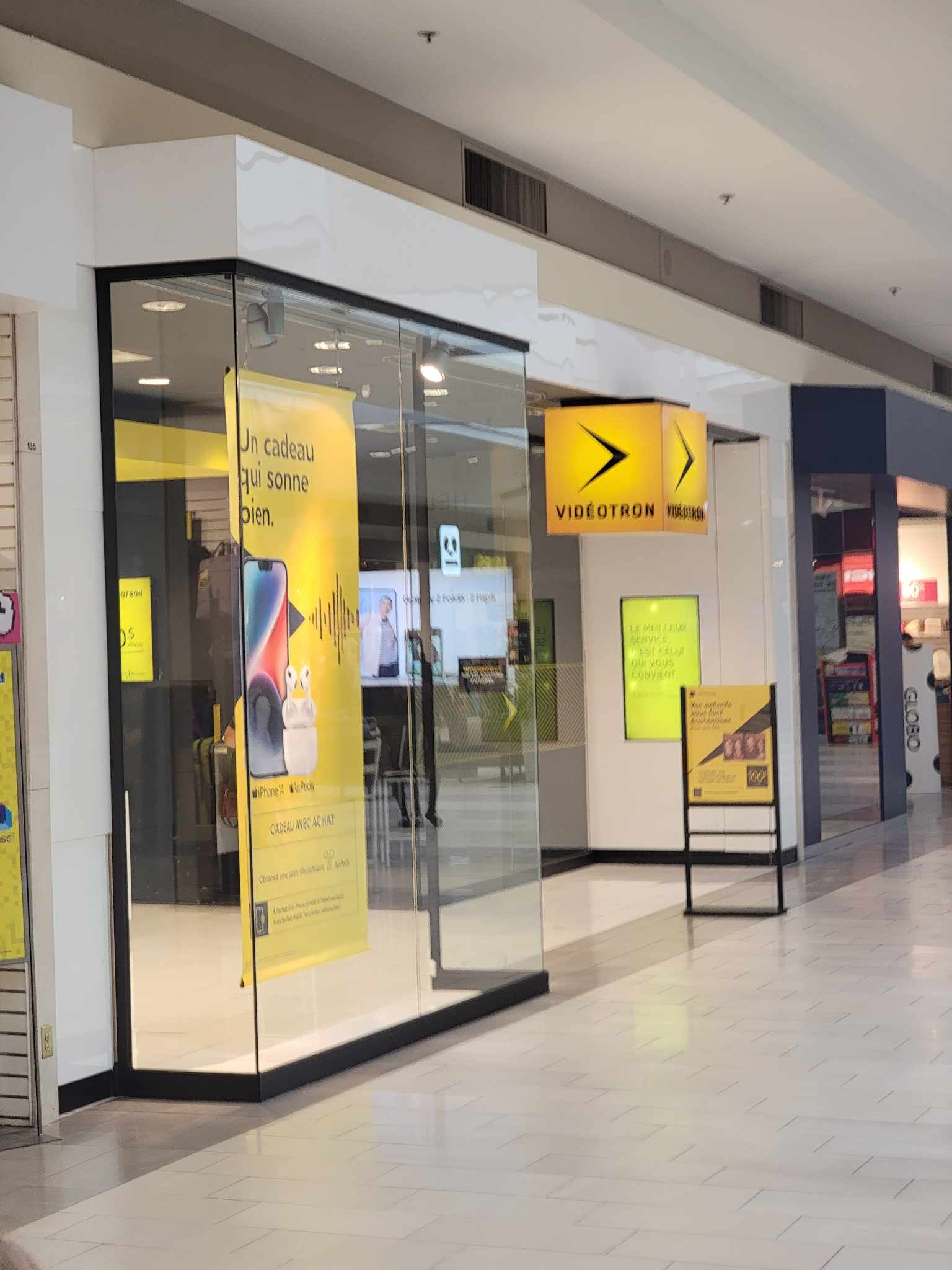
Videotron store

== See also ==
- List of largest shopping malls in Canada
- List of malls in Montreal
- Montreal
