= Target Canada =

Canadian discount department store chain

Target Canada Co.

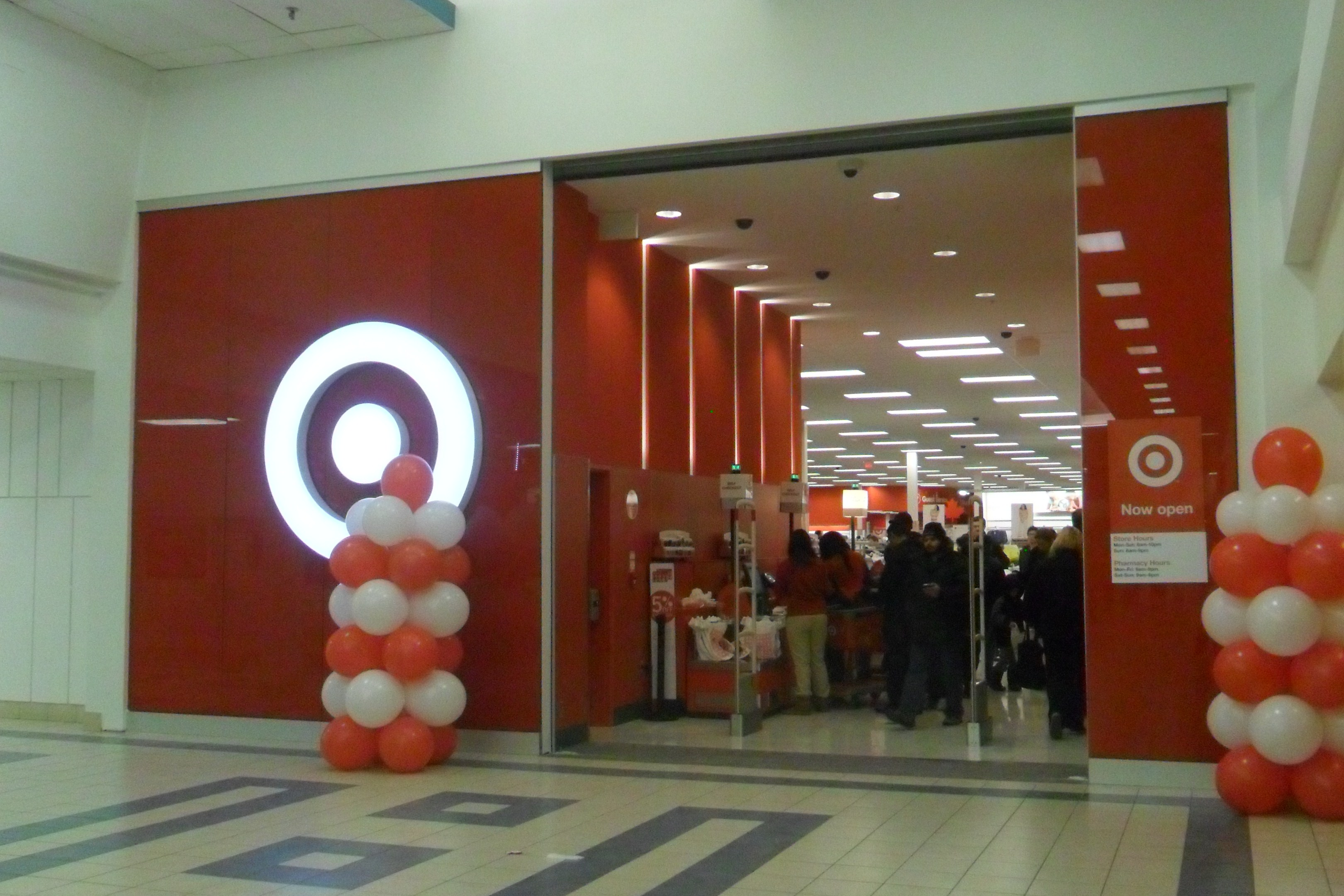
- Entrance to the Target store at Shoppers World Brampton in Brampton, Ontario (store #3668), during its grand opening in 2013
- Type: Subsidiary
- Industry: Retail
- Predecessor: Zellers
- Founded: January 2011; 15 years ago
- Defunct: April 12, 2015; 11 years ago
- Fate: Bankruptcy
- Headquarters: Mississauga, Ontario
- Number of locations: 133 (2015)
- Area served: Canada
- Key people: Aaron Alt (CEO)
- Products: Beauty and health products; bedding; clothing and accessories; electronics; food; furniture; housewares; jewelry; lawn and garden; pet supplies; shoes; small appliances; sporting goods; toys/games.
- Number of employees: 17,600 (2015)
- Parent: Target Corporation
- Website: Archived official website at the Wayback Machine (archive index)

Target Canada Co. was a short-lived Canadian subsidiary of the Target Corporation, the eighth-largest retailer in the United States. Formerly headquartered in Mississauga, Ontario, the subsidiary formed with the acquisition of Zellers store leases from the Hudson's Bay Company (HBC) in January 2011. Target Canada opened its first store in March 2013, and by January 2015 was operating 133 locations throughout Canada. Its main competition included Walmart Canada, Loblaws, Shoppers Drug Mart, and Canadian Tire.

Target Canada was ultimately unsuccessful, owing in part to an overly aggressive expansion initiative, in addition to higher prices and a limited selection of products compared to Target stores in the United States and its Canadian rivals, particularly Walmart. The retail chain racked up losses of $2.1 billion in its lifespan, and was widely viewed as a failure, termed a "spectacular failure" by Amanda Lang of CBC News, "an unmitigated disaster" by Maclean's magazine and "a gold standard case study in what retailers should not do when they enter a new market" by the Financial Post. Target Canada commenced Court-supervised restructuring proceedings in January 2015, and finally shut down all of their stores by April 12, 2015, amid the retail apocalypse in Canada.

== History ==
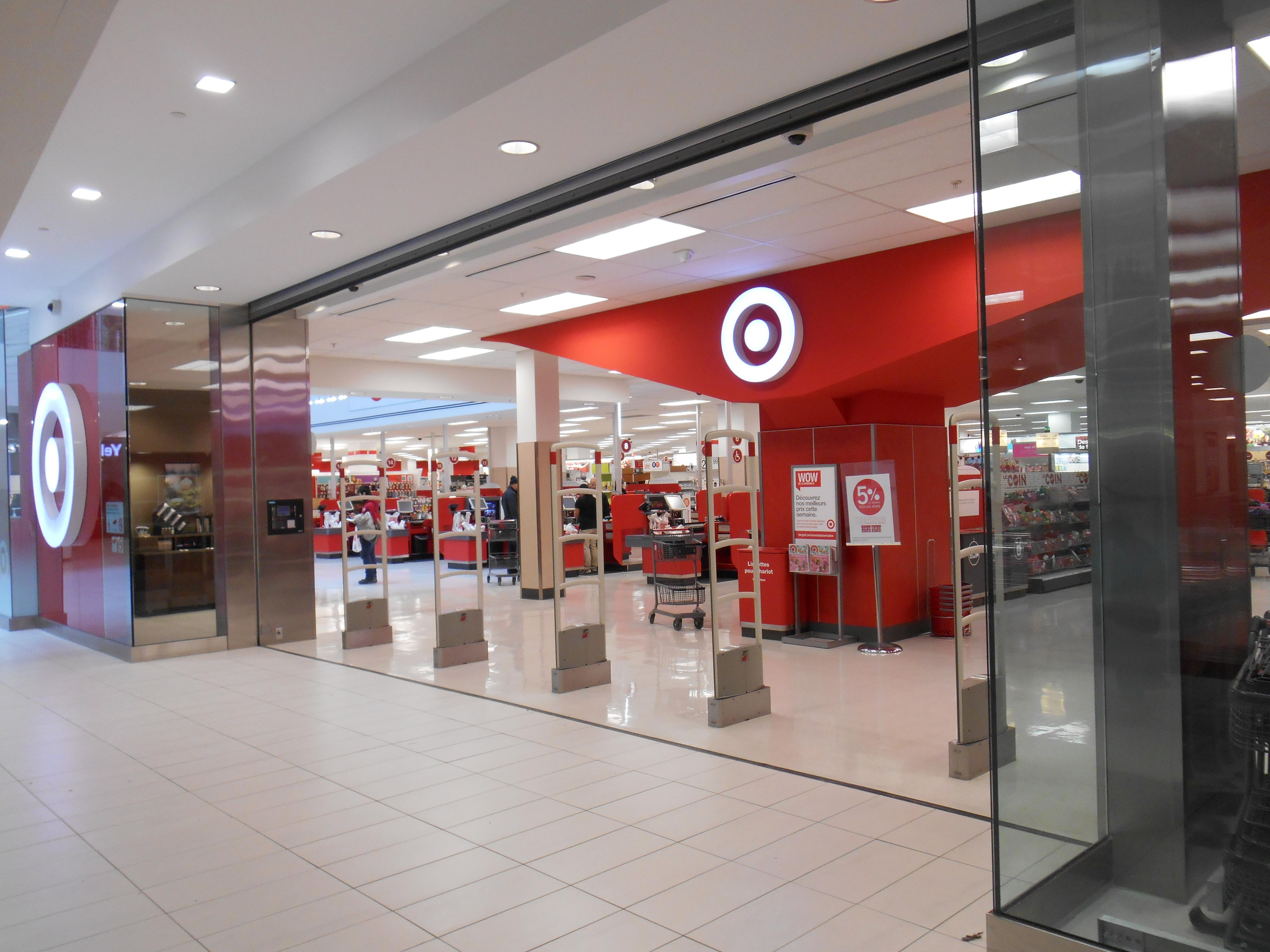
The Target store at Alexis Nihon Complex in Montreal, Quebec (store #3704)

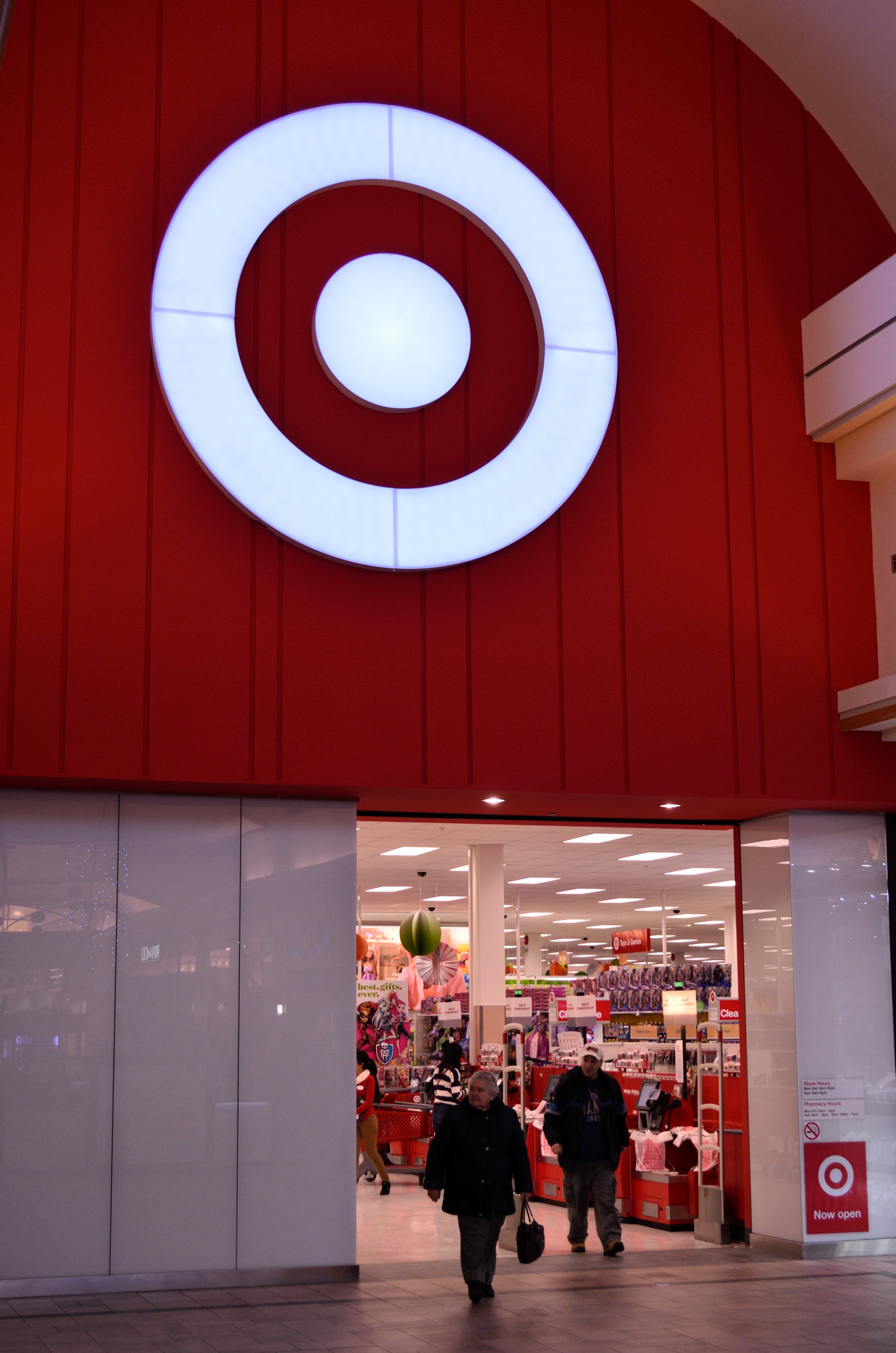
A Target Store in Hillcrest Mall in Richmond Hill, Ontario (store #3666). This store was replaced with Marshalls and HomeSense in Fall 2018.

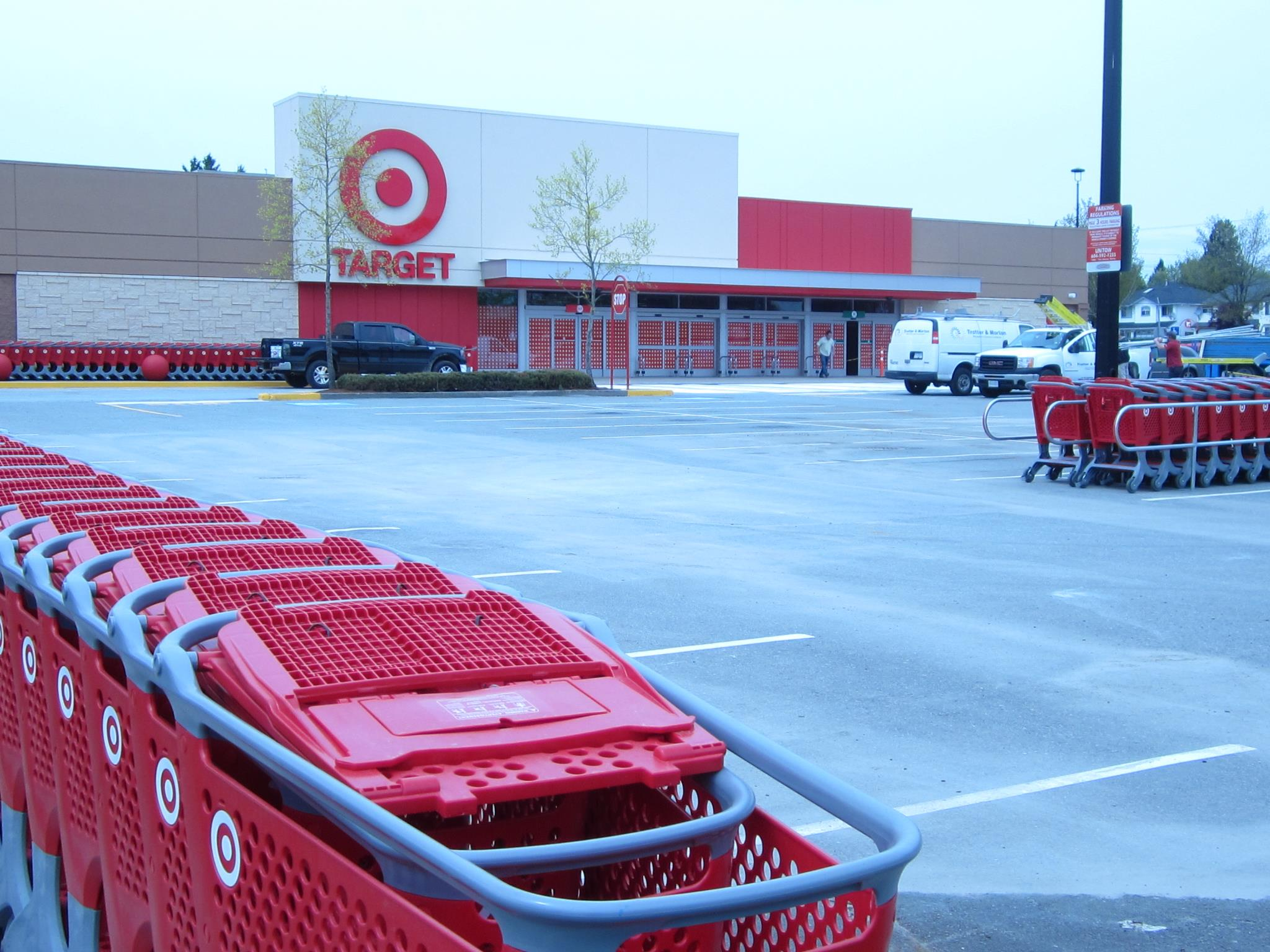
Target store at Scottsdale Centre in Delta, BC (store #3557). This store has now become a Walmart.

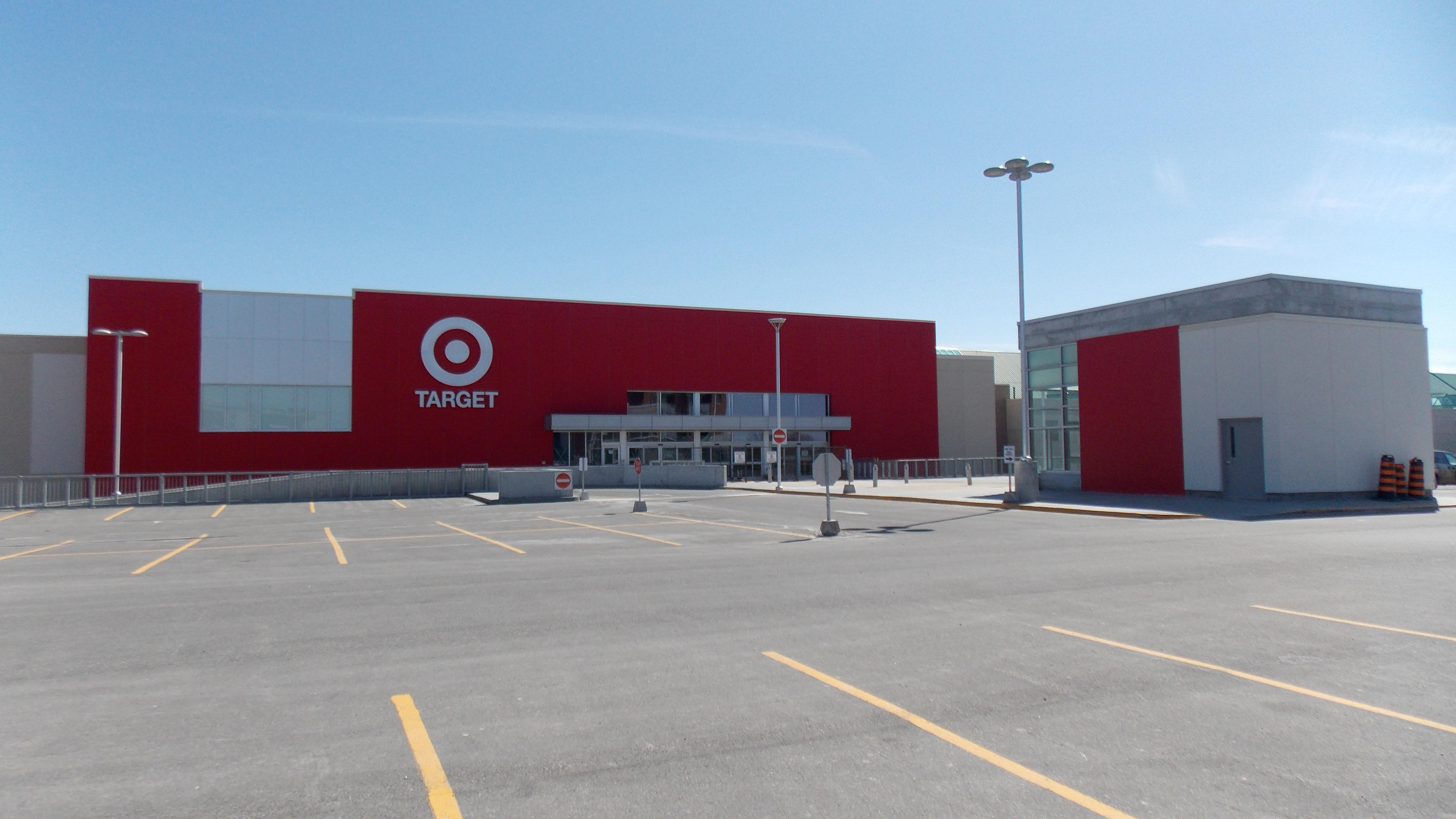
The Target store built at the Bayshore Shopping Centre in Ottawa, Ontario. It never opened to the public, with its signage logo still intact, and was subsequently sold to Walmart in 2015.

=== Trademark issues before 2010 ===
In the absence of the Target Corporation chain in Canada, several retail companies, without any affiliation to the American company, made use of the "Target" name for various purposes. A regional variety store chain in Newfoundland and Labrador operated under the Target banner during the 1980s and early 1990s. There has also been a liquor store named Target Liquor in Edmonton, and a Target convenience store chain based in Toronto.

Before it entered Canada, Target Corporation attempted to solidify its rights to the "Target" brand name in Canada by buying the Canadian trademark rights of some of these existing users, in addition to filing new applications of its own.

==== Target Apparel trademark agreement ====
Target's expansion into Canada was threatened by one other party that claimed the Canadian rights to "Target" with respect to clothing. The Canadian trademark "Target Apparel" was registered in 1981 by Dylex Ltd., a Canadian retailer defunct since the early 2000s, covering "men's clothing, namely suits, pants, jackets, and coats". The rights to the mark were acquired in 2001 by Fairweather Ltd., part of the INC Group of Companies owned by Isaac Benitah. Target Apparel originally served as a private-label clothing brand, and not as the name of a retail store, and Fairweather would not apply to extend its trademark to cover retail services until April 2011.

INC Group opened a small Target Apparel retail store adjacent to the company's head office in December 2003. In late 2010, soon after Target's announcement that it planned to expand into Canada (but before the Zellers announcement), INC began expanding the banner to other higher-profile locations, including conversions of some of its existing Labels stores. Target challenged INC's rights to the Target Apparel trade name on numerous occasions; INC had succeeded in retaining those rights, but faced a further court challenge with a trial set to start in 2012.

On February 1, 2012, it was announced that Fairweather Ltd. and Target reached an agreement concerning the use of the Target name in Canada. Under this agreement, Fairweather would cease use of the Target Apparel name by 2013, giving Target Canada complete ownership of the Target brand in Canada.

=== 2010: Consideration of Canadian operations ===
Regular rumours surfaced since at least 2004 that Target was interested in expanding into Canada by acquiring Zellers outright. In January 2010, Target publicly indicated long-term plans to expand internationally, likely including Canada, but that those plans would not take effect until 2013 at the earliest.

=== 2011–2013: Leaseholds acquisition and partnership ===
On January 13, 2011, Target announced that it would purchase the lease agreements of up to 220 Zellers stores for C$1.825 billion (approximately $2.427 billion in 2025 adjusted for inflation). Under the agreement, Zellers would sublease the properties, and continue to operate them as Zellers locations until at the earliest January 2012 and, at the latest, the end of March 2013.

Target did not buy the Zellers chain outright, which was left with 64 stores in less desirable locations. HBC failed to find a buyer for the remaining stores and planned to continue operating Zellers as a smaller chain. However, the geographical constraints of serving these far-flung Zellers outlets meant that operating them was no longer economically viable, so HBC announced on July 26, 2012, that it would close almost all of these stores.

In May 2011, Target revealed its first 105 selections and stated that the vast majority of those in this first group would be converted to Target outlets. In September 2011, Target unveiled 84 additional selections, bringing the number of Zellers leases acquired to 189 below the prospective upper number of 220 announced in January. The first store opening cycle would be in March/April 2013, followed by four additional cycles later that year. Zellers locations to be converted were typically closed for six to nine months for significant remodelling and renovation. Target announced plans to hire 27,000 new employees to support its expansion into Canada, including 5,000 in Quebec, and that its food and grocery items in Canada would be supplied by Sobeys.

After the Zellers stores at the selected locations closed, Target planned to renovate between 125 and 135 of them, and reopen them under the Target banner. Target would sell the remaining 64 to 74 acquired locations to other retailers, including 39 already resold to Walmart Canada.

Unlike Walmart's entry to Canada with the acquisition of the Woolco stores in 1994, Zellers employees were not retained by Target nor Walmart, and they had to re-apply for their position to continue working in their same locations. Target Canada stated that former Zellers workers were guaranteed an interview though not a job; however, the United Food and Commercial Workers of Canada complained that many Zellers employees were not hired, including those with long years of service.

Target confirmed the list of its locations in July 2012. The chain finalized its 127 stores to open in 2013. Of this total, 125 were converted former Zellers stores. The other two locations in Niagara Falls and Centre Laval were sites that had been occupied by Walmart stores. The first Target stores in Canada were opened on March 5, 2013, in the Ontario communities of Guelph, Fergus, and Milton, being close to one of Target Canada's three distribution centres.

Target Canada had its head offices in Mississauga's Airport Corporate Centre in the same building as Pepsico Canada's offices during Target Canada's years of operation.

=== 2013–2015: Years of operation ===
Target Canada had supply chain problems, but its parent company did not want the planned opening date to be delayed, since they did not want to continue paying rent on unopened stores.

On March 5, 2013, three Target stores in Milton, Fergus and Guelph, Ontario, were opened to the public and operating as test stores, and a further 17 stores in Ontario opened on March 19, 2013. Four additional stores in Ontario were opened on March 28, 2013, followed by a number of openings in three western provinces on May 6, 2013. On July 16, 2013, Target opened more stores in four provinces, including in the cities of Regina and Saskatoon. Target opened more stores between September 17 and October 18, including in the provinces of Quebec and Nova Scotia. It opened 33 locations between November 13 and 22, including in the provinces of New Brunswick, Prince Edward Island and Newfoundland and Labrador. On March 14, 2014, Target opened three stores in the cities of Toronto, Edmonton and Victoria. On August 1, 2014, it opened three stores in the cities of Barrie, Mississauga and Candiac, Quebec.

Target Canada included smaller Starbucks stores in the majority of its locations. A notable Canadian clothing brand, Roots, was "temporarily" sold in Target Canada.

==== Early results ====
Target Canada president Tony Fisher expected that some Canadian consumers would continue to cross the border and shop at Target stores in the United States. Fisher acknowledged that the Canadian stores would not have price parity with their U.S. counterparts, saying "Transportation costs are higher, distribution costs are higher, fuel costs are higher, wage rates vary across the country, the tax rates are different, cost of goods are different, the duties — I think the scale we have here in Canada is quite different from the incredibly different, densely populated U.S. marketplace." Because of complexities and other legal requirements, Target's existing distribution network could not be used to service Target's Canadian locations. In addition, Canadian Target stores did not have local authority to order their own merchandise; this resulted in the Windsor, Ontario, stores stocking Toronto Maple Leafs and Toronto Blue Jays apparel, instead of that of the Detroit Red Wings and Detroit Tigers, which were more popular in Windsor, given its proximity to Detroit across the Detroit River. Supply chain and demand issues also led to situations where some of the early locations were not adequately stocked in certain product categories, resulting in empty shelves. The supply chain problems were blamed on using a brand new SAP inventory software and not giving sufficient time for staff to work out the system's problems, as the parent company refused to push back the planned launch date as they did not want to keep paying rent on unopened stores.

Target Corporation's expansion into Canada hoped to capitalize on Canadian shoppers who frequently crossed the border for its U.S. stores. However, this may have backfired as Canadian shoppers felt that Target Canada stores failed to meet the high expectations set by their U.S. counterparts. Target Canada enjoyed a strong opening, but subsequent results were disappointing, dragging down its parent company's second-quarter results. Despite the initial high traffic at Target's new stores, customers were not returning frequently enough to these stores to buy the basic household items, as that market was dominated by entrenched Canadian grocery and drug retail chains such as Loblaws, Shoppers Drug Mart, and Walmart Canada. In addition, while Target Canada aimed to have its customers do "one-stop shopping", Canadian consumers generally pick and choose between different retailers' strengths, often going to different retailers whenever certain items go on sale as evidenced by Canadians sometimes carrying shopping bags from competing businesses. While Target Canada stores were said to be an improvement over the untidy Zellers stores, some Canadians lamented that they missed the deals found at Zellers.

Paul Trussell, retailing analyst at Deutsche Bank, suggested that "traffic has slowed below expectations in recent weeks, driven partly by Canadians' perception that prices are too high, both relative to Walmart Canada and Target's U.S. locations. While shoppers appreciate the higher quality assortment, especially in discretionary categories, the complaints on pricing were alarming." Target failed to anticipate that Canadian consumers would expect the retailer to match the lower prices in its U.S. stores, leading to some alienation and confusion, although Target CEO Gregg Steinhafel defended this practice saying "trying to compare prices at Target Canada with that of certain Target stores in the U.S. would be like comparing prices in Boston to prices in rural Iowa". Deutsche Bank's pricing survey on 31 health, beauty and food items at Canadian Target and Walmart stores found that while Target had a cheaper basket of goods by 19 cents, Walmart had a pricing advantage of 65 percent of the popular items in the basket thanks to its own "Rollback" prices, likely furthering consumers' current price perceptions. Other American chains operating in Canada did not suffer a backlash from Canada–U.S. pricing disparities as much, likely as Target had hyped its Canadian stores to provide the same experience as their U.S. counterparts.

Target projected for its Canadian operations to bring in ten percent of its profits by 2017. However, experts suggested that it wanted too much and too quickly from Canadians, while underestimating the domestic competition. The disappointing results from Canadian stores were said to be a major reason, along with the January 2014 major security breach, for the resignation of parent company CEO Gregg Steinhafel, though Target reiterated its commitment to the Canadian market. Two weeks after Steinhafel's abrupt departure, Target Canada president Anthony S. "Tony" Fisher was dismissed and replaced by Mark Schindele, who had been serving as Target's senior vice-president of merchandising operations. Subsequent commentators did not blame Fisher, "the odds were stacked against him from the start, given the extremely tight timeline and the thin margin for error."

Around the time that Mark Schindele took over, Target Canada had largely sorted out its inventory issues. However, Brian Cornell, who replaced Steinhafel as CEO of the parent company, was a company outsider who had reportedly pushed for Target Canada to be shut down if its financial performance did not improve.

=== 2015: Closure ===
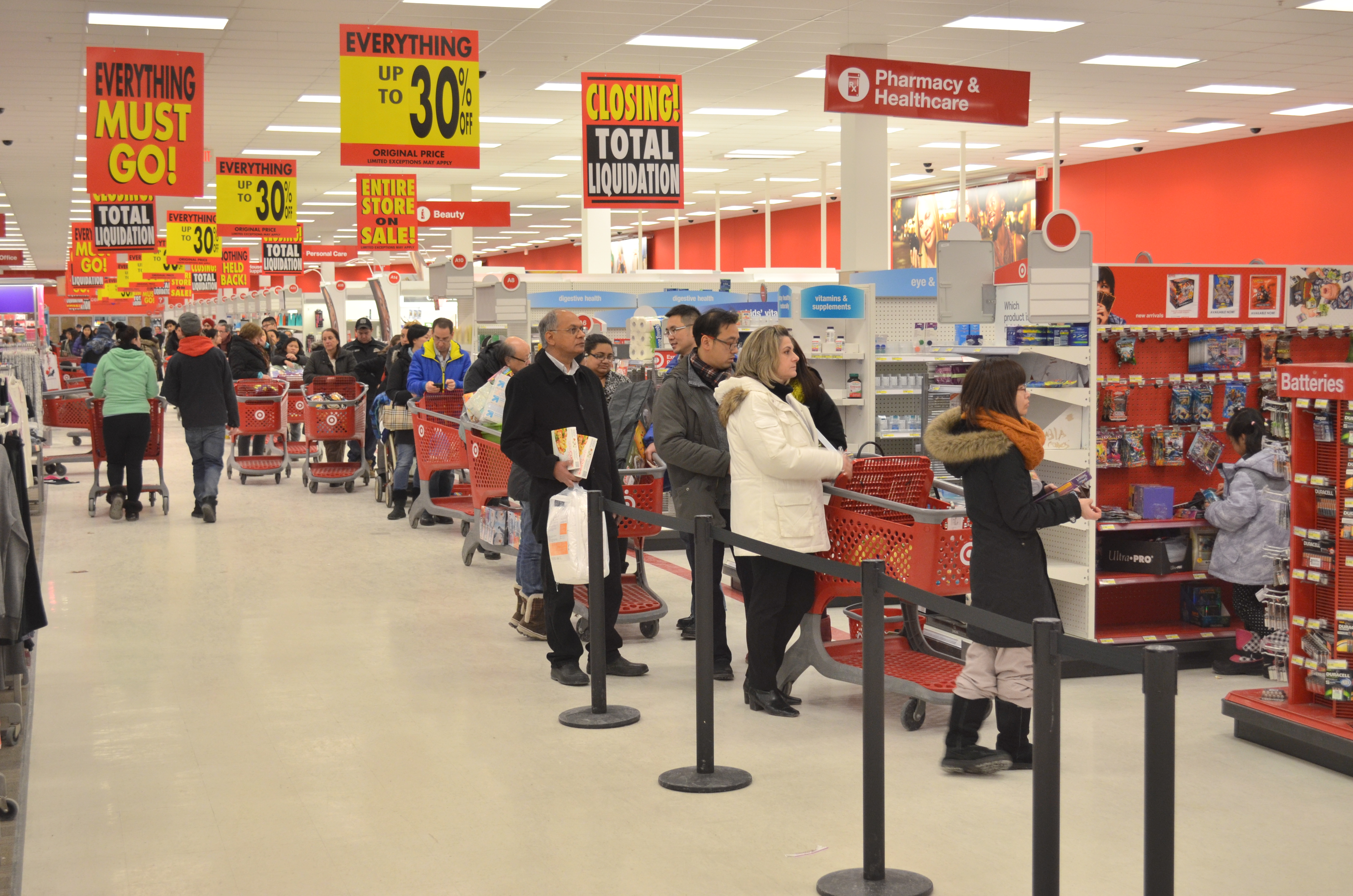
Long checkout lineup at former Target in Hillcrest Mall in Richmond Hill, Ontario (store #3666) during its liquidation sale in February 2015

On January 15, 2015, Target Canada announced that it had commenced Court-supervised restructuring proceedings under the Companies' Creditors Arrangement Act and that it would close all 133 of its Canadian stores. Two planned new store openings, one at the Harbour Plaza condo project in the South Core of Downtown Toronto, and the Bayshore Shopping Centre in the west end of Ottawa, were cancelled due to the closure. Likewise, plans to open a smaller Target store in the former Zellers location in Lawrence Square Shopping Centre (later renamed Lawrence Allen Centre in late 2019) in Toronto similar to the CityTarget format were also cancelled and were replaced with two additional public mall entrances, Marshalls, HomeSense and PetSmart by early 2016 (and Structube a few years later but before the mall's renaming).

By 2015, the subsidiary had lost $2.1 billion and was not projected to make a profit until at least 2021 assuming the COVID-19 pandemic did not happen. Target Canada would have been unable to meet its employees' payroll for the week of January 16, 2015, if it had not filed for Court protection from creditors.

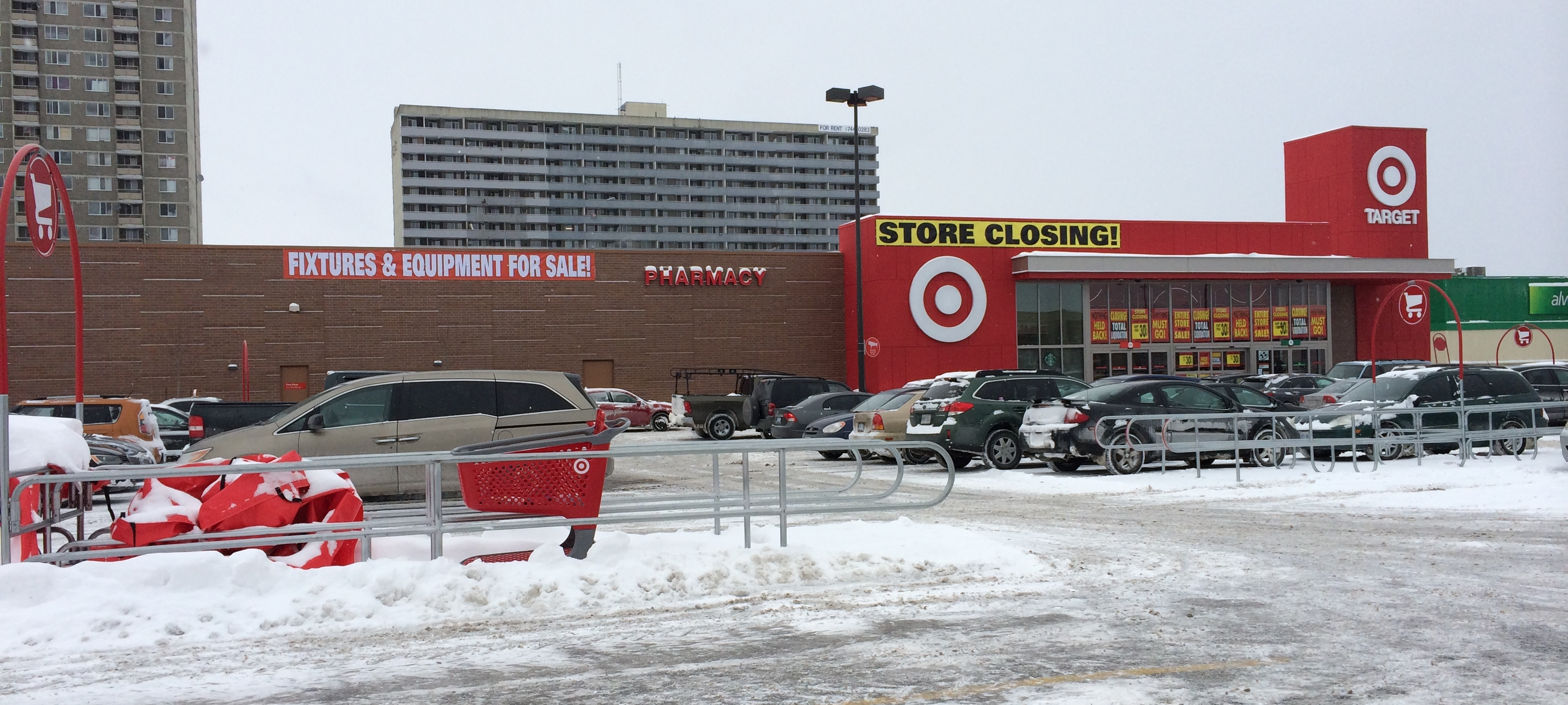
Store Closing announced on St. Laurent Boulevard in Ottawa (store #3658) in February 2015

Liquidation sales began at the stores the following day; Target began to close stores on March 18, 2015, with 58 locations scheduled to close that week, and 58 in total closed by April 5, 2015. The remaining 58 stores closed on April 12, 2015.

In May 2015, the company returned some of its leases back to their landlords, and began the process of auctioning off leases and properties to other new owners. Canadian Tire announced plans to acquire 12 locations, Walmart Canada reached a deal to acquire 13 locations (including the aborted Bayshore Shopping Centre location) and one of its distribution centres, and Lowe's also reached a deal to acquire 13 locations and a distribution centre. Giant Tiger also acquired a part of a Target location. Metro's discount supermarket chain Super C would open stores in two former Target stores in Quebec.

== Target International Shopping ==
In October 2015, Target began offering international shipping on goods sold on their online site, which includes Canada. Prices for Canadian shoppers are converted to Canadian dollars, excluding duties and taxes. As of February 2020, Target has discontinued shipping to Canada and other international locations.

== Timeline ==
=== 2011 ===
- January 12: Agreement signed.
- January 13: Announcement of sale.
- May 26: Announcement of first 105 site selections.
- September 23: Announcement of final 84 site selections and partnership with Sobeys.
- September 23: Walmart Canada announces completion of acquisition from Target Canada of leases for 39 locations occupied by Zellers.

=== 2012 ===
- January 31: An earliest possible date that Target might require some acquired locations to be vacated by Zellers.

=== 2013 ===
- March 5: First Target Canada locations opened in Guelph, Fergus, and Milton, all of which are in the Ontario Peninsula.
- March 19: More Target Canada locations opened in Ontario, including East York Town Centre, Aurora Shopping Centre, Cloverdale Mall, Cambridge Centre, Centre Mall (in Hamilton), Shoppers World Brampton, Centerpoint Mall, Taunton Road Power Centre, Masonville Place, Upper Canada Mall, Devonshire Mall, and Durham Centre.
- March 28: Burlington Mall (since renamed Burlington Centre), Shoppers World Danforth, Square One Shopping Centre and Trinity Common Mall locations opened.
- March 31: All acquired locations must be vacated by Zellers by this date.
- May 7: More Target Canada stores opened in nine British Columbia locations, ten Alberta locations and three Manitoba locations.
- May 14: Target Canada stores opened in Pine Centre Mall in Prince George and The Shoppes at Shawnessy in Calgary.
- July 16: Target Canada stores opened in two British Columbia locations, two Alberta locations, three Saskatchewan locations and 11 Ontario locations including Intercity Shopping Centre in Thunder Bay. One of the Ontario locations was at Five Points Mall in Oshawa.
- July 23: The Cataraqui Centre location opened in Kingston, Ontario.
- July 30: The Bramalea City Centre location opened in Brampton, Ontario.
- September 17: Target Canada stores opened in four locations in Eastern Ontario, seven Quebec locations and three Nova Scotia locations.
- October 18: Target Canada stores opened in nine locations, all in the province of Quebec.
- November 13: Target Canada opened 31 more locations in nine provinces including New Brunswick, Prince Edward Island and Newfoundland and Labrador.
- November 22: Target Canada opened two more locations in the Pen Centre in St. Catharines, Ontario and Carrefour de l'Estrie in Sherbrooke, Quebec.

=== 2014 ===
- March 14: Target Canada opened three locations in The Stockyards in Toronto, Ontario, Kingsway Mall in Edmonton, Alberta and Hillside Shopping Centre in Victoria, British Columbia.
- August 1: Target Canada opened three locations in Park Place in Barrie, Ontario, Erin Mills Town Centre in Mississauga, Ontario and Carrefour Candiac in Candiac, Quebec.
- October 17: Target Canada opened one location in Polo Park in Winnipeg.

=== 2015 ===
- January 15: Target announces it was ceasing all Canadian retail operations and would proceed to close 133 outlets.
- January 23: Target Canada closed all Starbucks outlets in their stores.
- February 4: Target Canada received court approval to begin the liquidation process.
- February 5: All Target Canada stores started liquidation process.
- March 6: Ivanhoé Cambridge and Oxford landlords purchased back 11 coveted Target store leases at premier mall locations for an estimated $138 million.
- March 18: Stratford, Ontario; Longueuil and Edmonton (Bonnie Doon Centre) locations closed.
- March 22: 13 more locations closed.
- March 27 – April 2: 62 more locations closed.
- April 4: Bramalea City Centre store in Brampton closed with most other stores left opened.
- April 12: All Target Canada stores were closed by this date.

== Gallery ==
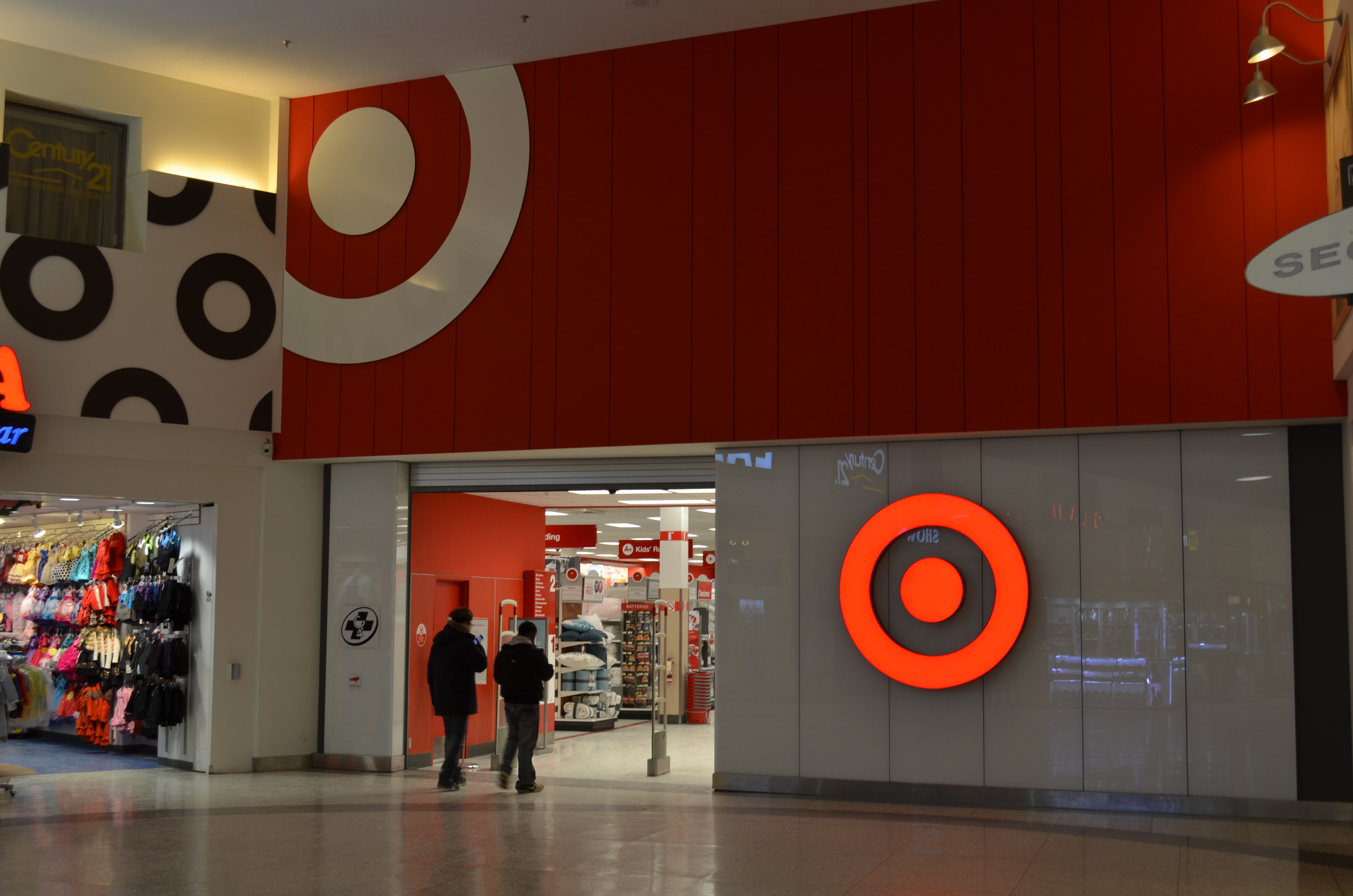
The mall entrance to the Target store in Centerpoint Mall in North York, Toronto, Ontario (store #3609) in 2014. This store closed in 2015 and became a Lowe's in 2016. However, Lowe's closed in 2019. As of 2020, the first-floor space is replaced with a Canada Computers & Electronics location (the second floor is closed off from the public and used as storage space for Canada Computers).

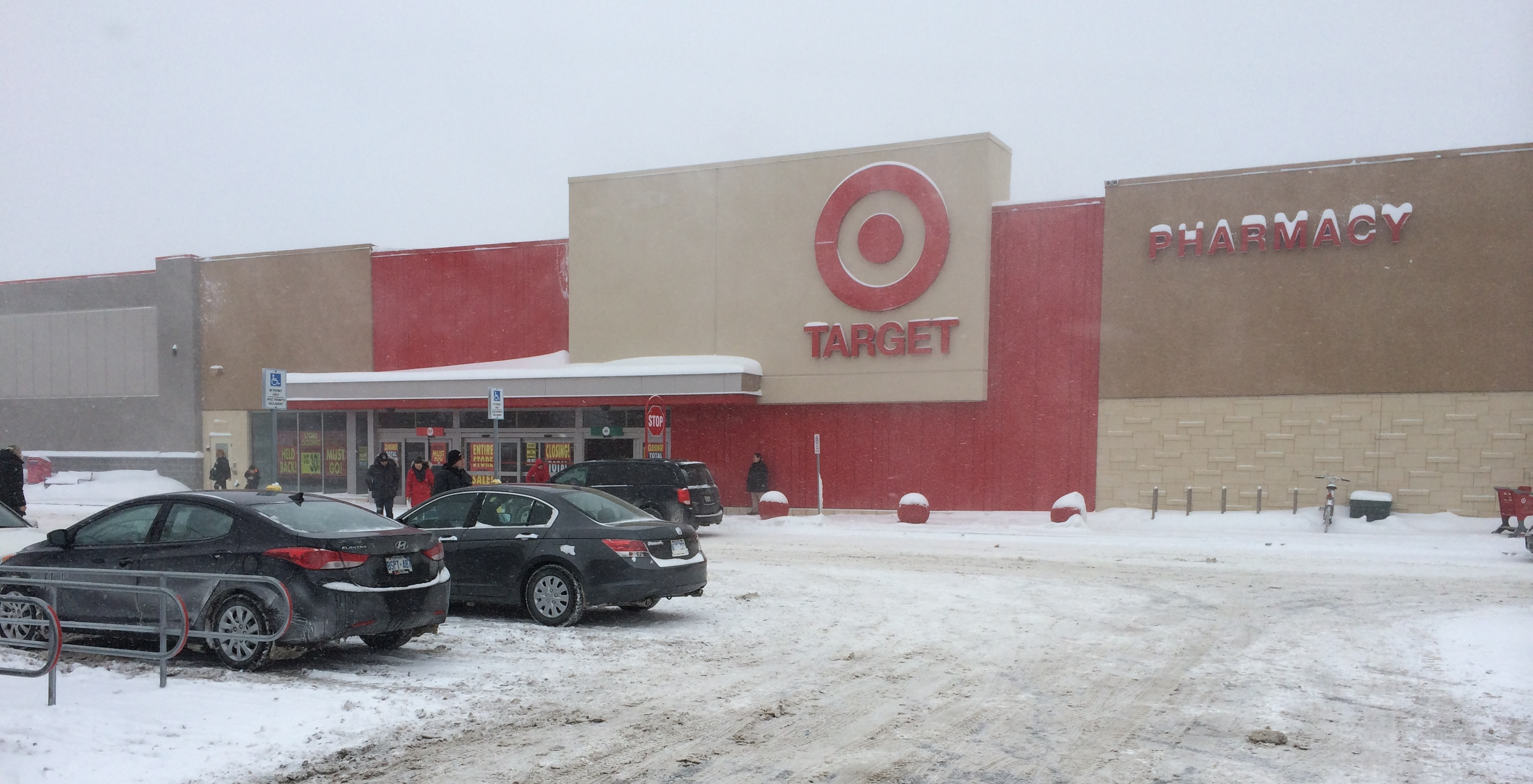
A Target store in Nepean, Ottawa, Ontario (store #3628) in 2015 during its closing sale. Closed in 2015 and became a FreshCo in 2017.

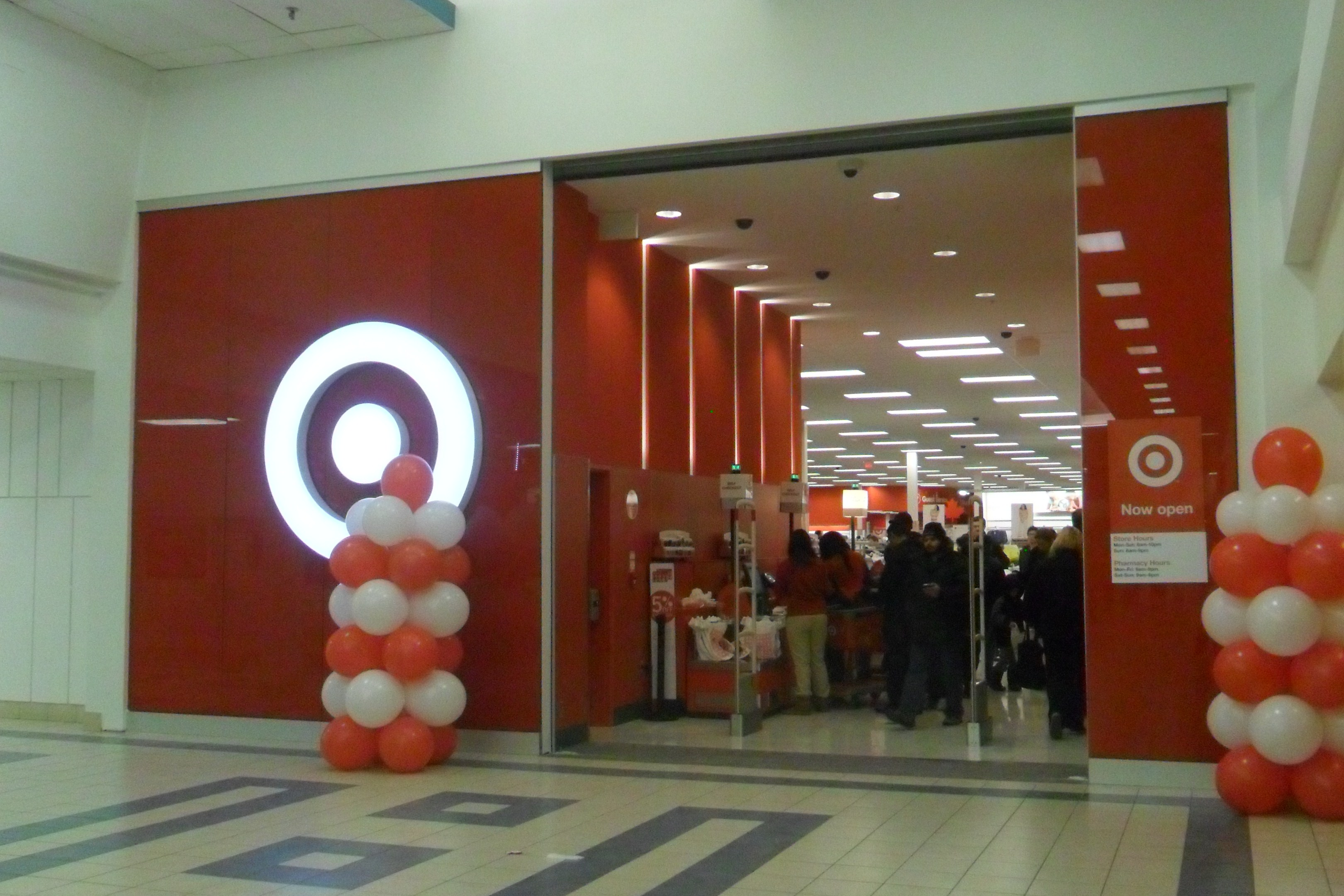
The mall entrance to the Target store at Shoppers World Brampton in Brampton, Ontario (store #3668), during its grand opening in 2013. Closed in 2015, and later expanded and became a Jysk, Staples, GoodLife Fitness, and a Giant Tiger in 2017 or 2018.

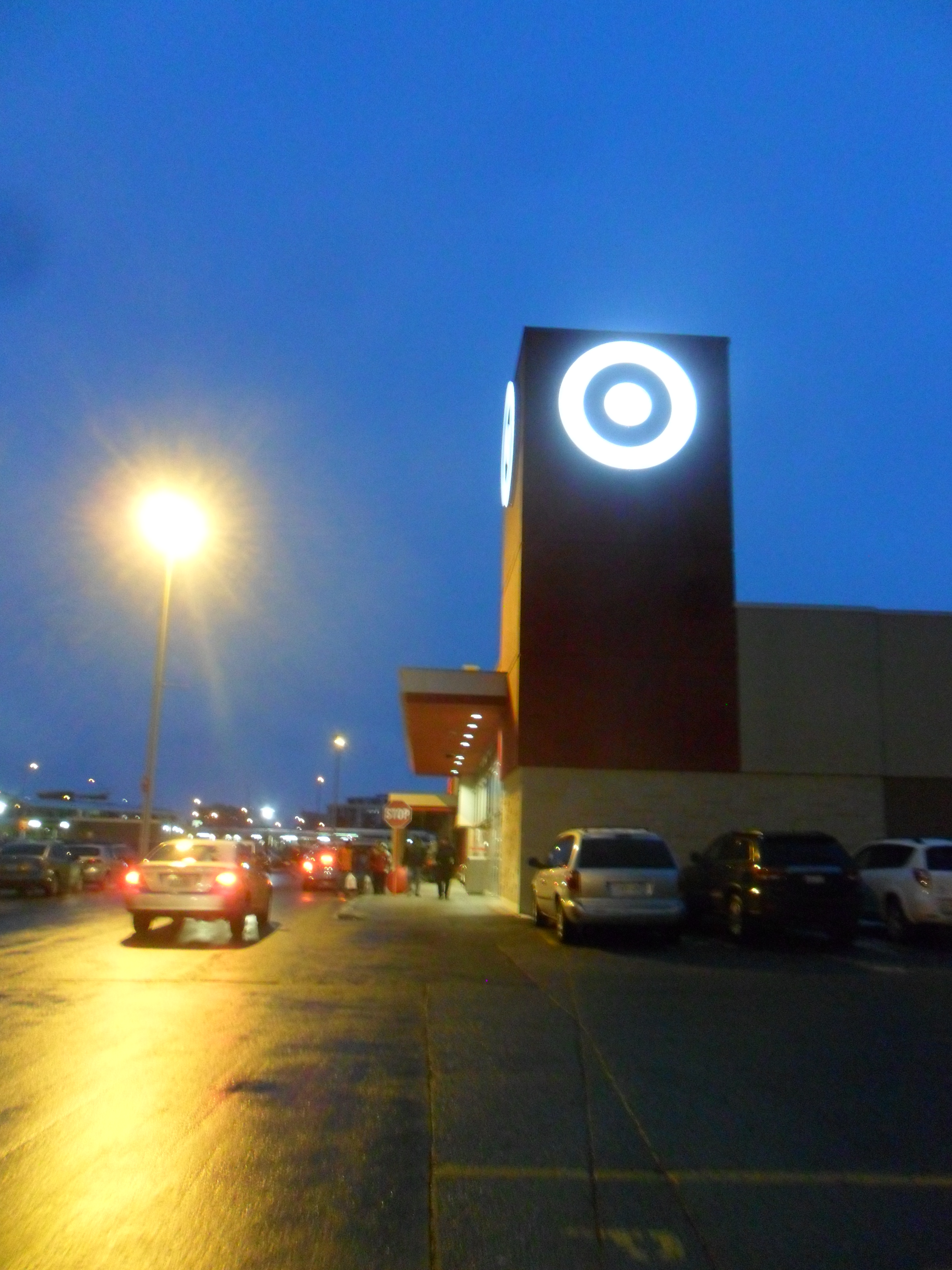
The outdoor entrance of the Target store at Shoppers World Brampton (store #3668)

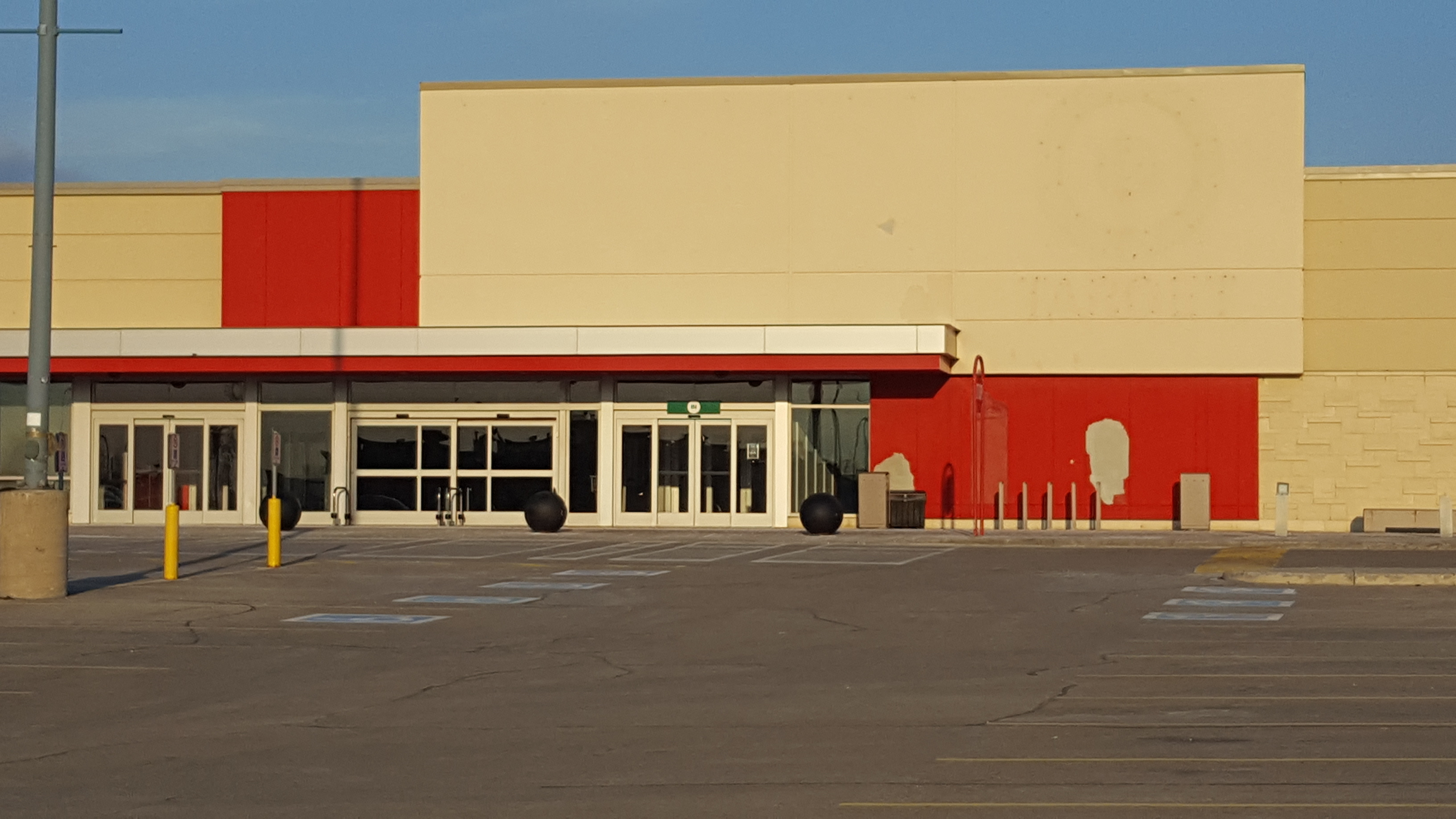
The abandoned Target store at Cambridge Centre in Cambridge, Ontario (store #3608) in 2017. The store sat abandoned for three and a half years until Marshalls, Sport Chek and Mark's took over the space in 2018.

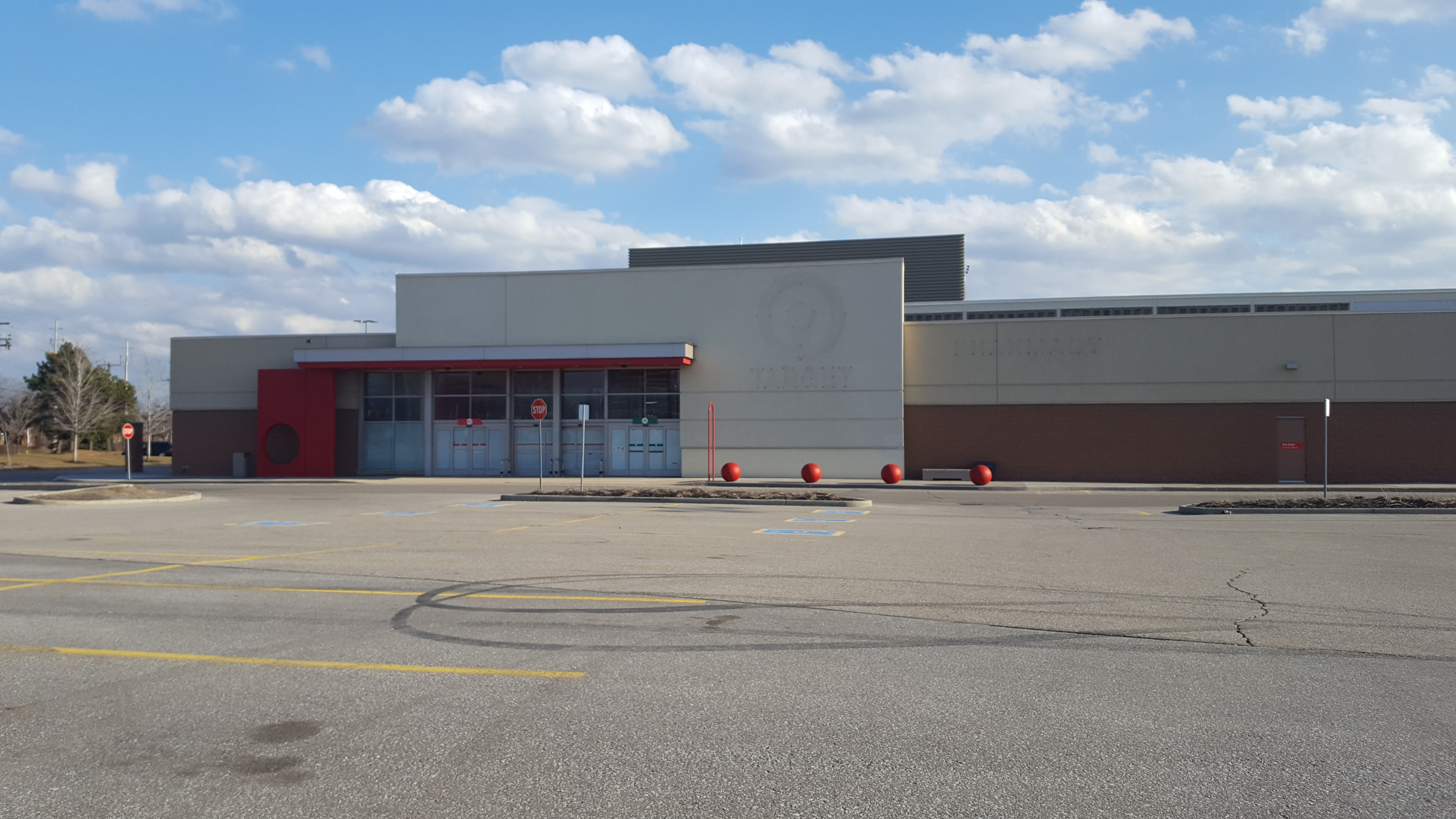
The abandoned Target store at Cloverdale Mall in Etobicoke, Ontario (store #3715) in 2017. This location was replaced with a COVID-19 Vaccine Clinic in 2021. However, it closed down in 2023 due to most people being vaccinated from COVID-19 and most pharmacies offering COVID-19 vaccinations. As of 2025, Fairgrounds Public Racket Club took over the space.

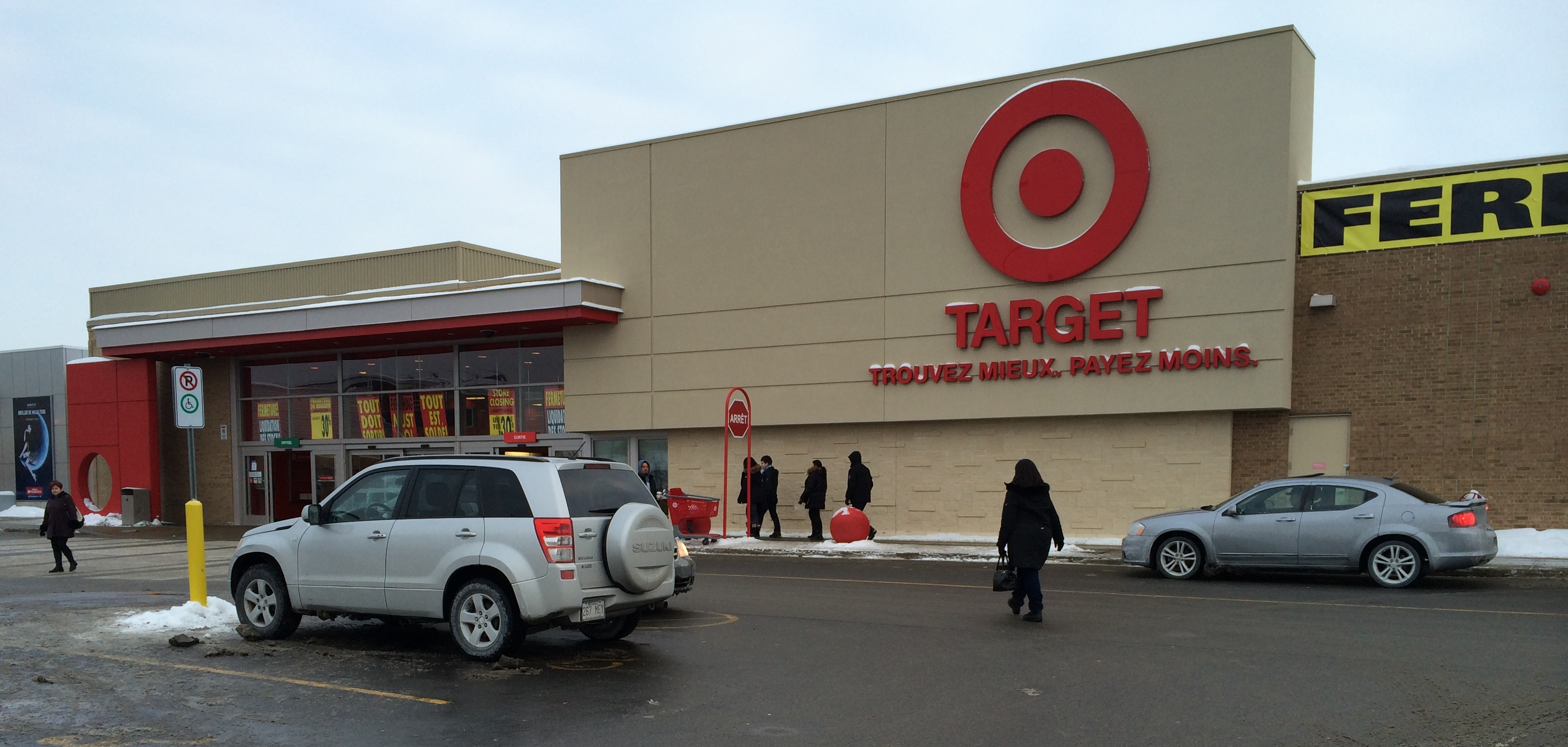
The Target store at Carrefour Angrignon in LaSalle, Quebec (store #3595) during its closing sale in 2015. Closed that year and became a Hudson's Bay in 2018. The Hudson's Bay closed in spring 2025 amid its bankruptcy.

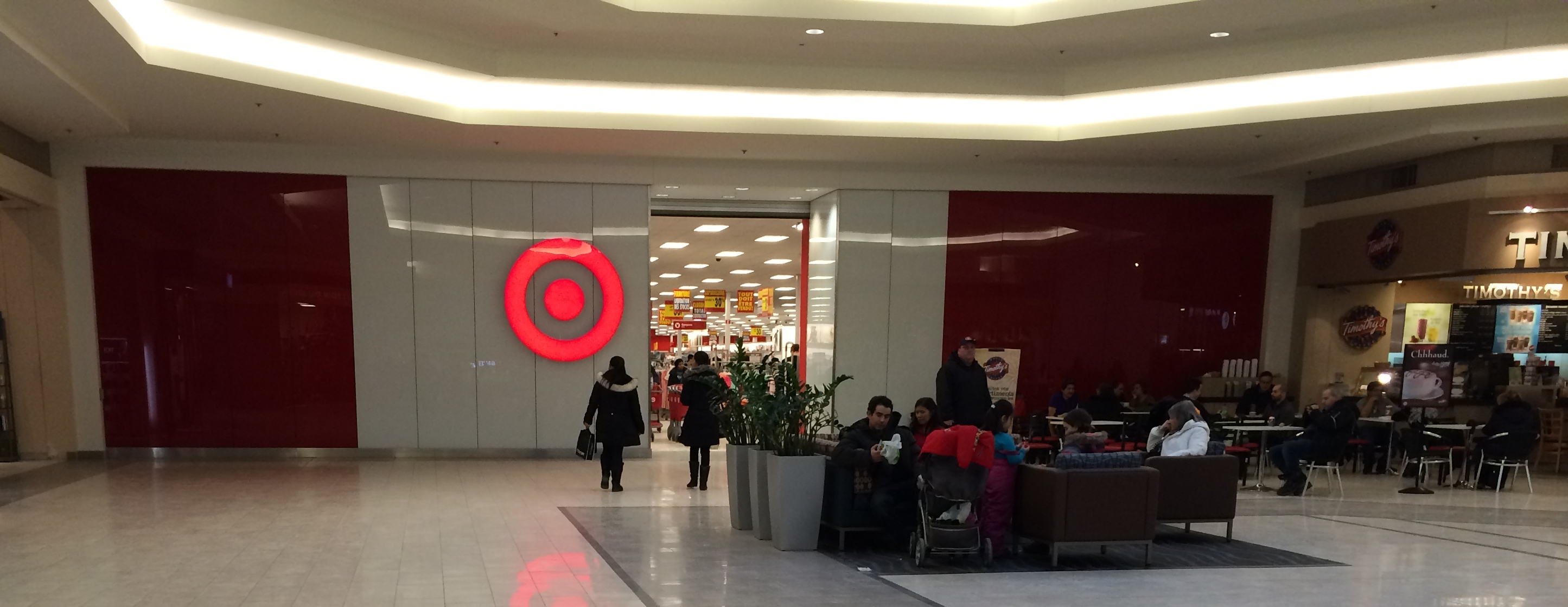
The mall entrance to the Target in Carrefour Angrignon during its liquidation sale (store #3595)

== REDcard ==
The REDcard was offered in Canada as either a debit card or a credit card. Around 30,000 Canadians signed up for the REDcard prior to Target's opening in 2013. Like its American counterpart, the cards offered a five-percent discount on almost all Target purchases and the debit card allowed up to a C$60 cash withdrawal. The Canadian version did not offer free online shipping (as online shopping was unavailable in Canada when Target's Canadian operations were active), a 30-day extended return period, a one-percent donation to K–12 schools on almost all purchases, a Visa credit card or a store-only credit card that are available in the United States. Target Canada stores did not accept U.S.-issued REDcards in its stores. Target Canada continued to honour the Canadian REDcard throughout its liquidation sales.

== Target Canada: The Play ==
Robert Motum, a Toronto-based playwright, spent two years interviewing and gathering the stories of former Target Canada employees. The words of 60 employees have been compiled into A Community Target – a verbatim play that examines the human story of Canada's precarious retail climate and depicts Target's whirlwind venture north of the border. The piece, commissioned by Outside the March Theatre Company, was directed by Mitchell Cushman, and was staged in a site-specific setting inside an empty Target store.

== See also ==
- Retail apocalypse
