= Hillside Shopping Centre =

Shopping mall

- Hillside Centre in 2018
- Coordinates: 48.44622°N 123.33569°W
- Address: 1644 Hillside Avenue; Victoria, British Columbia; V8T 2C5
- Opened: 1962
- Num. of stores: 100+
- Num. of anchor tenants: 8
- Floors: 2
- Parking: 1000+
- Website: hillsidecentre.com

Hillside Shopping Centre, also referred to as Hillside Mall, is a commercial shopping mall in Victoria, British Columbia, Canada. It was built in 1962 and has recently completed a major renovation. The centre is home to 100+ shops and services including a spacious food court with 14 vendors. Stores include Marshalls, Sport Chek / Atmosphere, Bolen Books, Thrifty Foods, Canadian Tire, and Walmart.

== Location and Neighbourhood ==
Hillside Centre is located in the northeast corner of the Oaklands neighbourhood of the City of Victoria on Vancouver Island, British Columbia, Canada. The shopping mall is bordered by major traffic routes including Shelbourne Street (on the east) and Hillside Avenue (on the south). Hillside Centre is located less than one kilometre west of the Lansdowne campus of Camosun College and is about 3 kilometres south-west of the University of Victoria campus. The mall has parking space for over 1,000 vehicles, and the Victoria Regional Transit System has several bus lines connecting the mall to Downtown, Esquimalt, Oak Bay, and Saanich.

== History ==
In the 19th century, the area that would later become Hillside Centre was rustic forest through which flowed Bowker Creek. Swedish immigrants Andrew and Palla Ohlson came to British Columbia in 1875 when the surrounding area began to be used as rural farmland. The Ohlsons established Oaklands Nurseries on the site soon after they arrived. Even after the death of the Ohlsons in the 1930s, the nurseries, including several large greenhouses, remained in operation until the 1950s. The land was later approved for retail space, and, in 1962, Hillside Mall hosted its official opening with more than 30,000 people in attendance. The mall reportedly cost 10 million CAD to construct.

The mall has undergone numerous changes over the decades. In 1985, an enclosed, farm-style market was added that included food vendors and glass patio seating. This replaced a Safeway grocery store that had been in that location since the 1960s. Renovations in 1996 converted the market into the current space for Bolen Books, and a new, more traditional, food court was added Hillside Centre underwent another round of renovations beginning in 2011 which would involve the construction of two-storey structures to accommodate the addition of US-based retailers such as Marshalls and Target which took over the space left by the closure of Zellers. These renovations also involved improving the landscaping of the mall's exterior areas by increasing the number of trees and other vegetation in previously paved areas of the parking lot.

== Tenants ==
Hillside Centre has been home to various anchor stores over the decades. Sears, a long-time anchor, closed its doors on January 9, 2018, for the last time. The space is now occupied by a Walmart, which opened on June 16, 2022.

Other anchor stores include Canadian pharmacy chain Shoppers Drug Mart, Marshalls, SportChek / Atmosphere, Thrifty Foods, Dollarama and Bolen Books. Target had a store at the mall before they closed in 2015 and the lease has now been acquired by Canadian Tire. Canadian Tire opened its second-largest store in November 2016 at the Hillside Centre.

Other businesses located at Hillside Centre include numerous clothing and shoe stores, a BC Liquor Store, banks, and dental/medical offices.
