= Urban Planet =

Clothing retailer in Canada

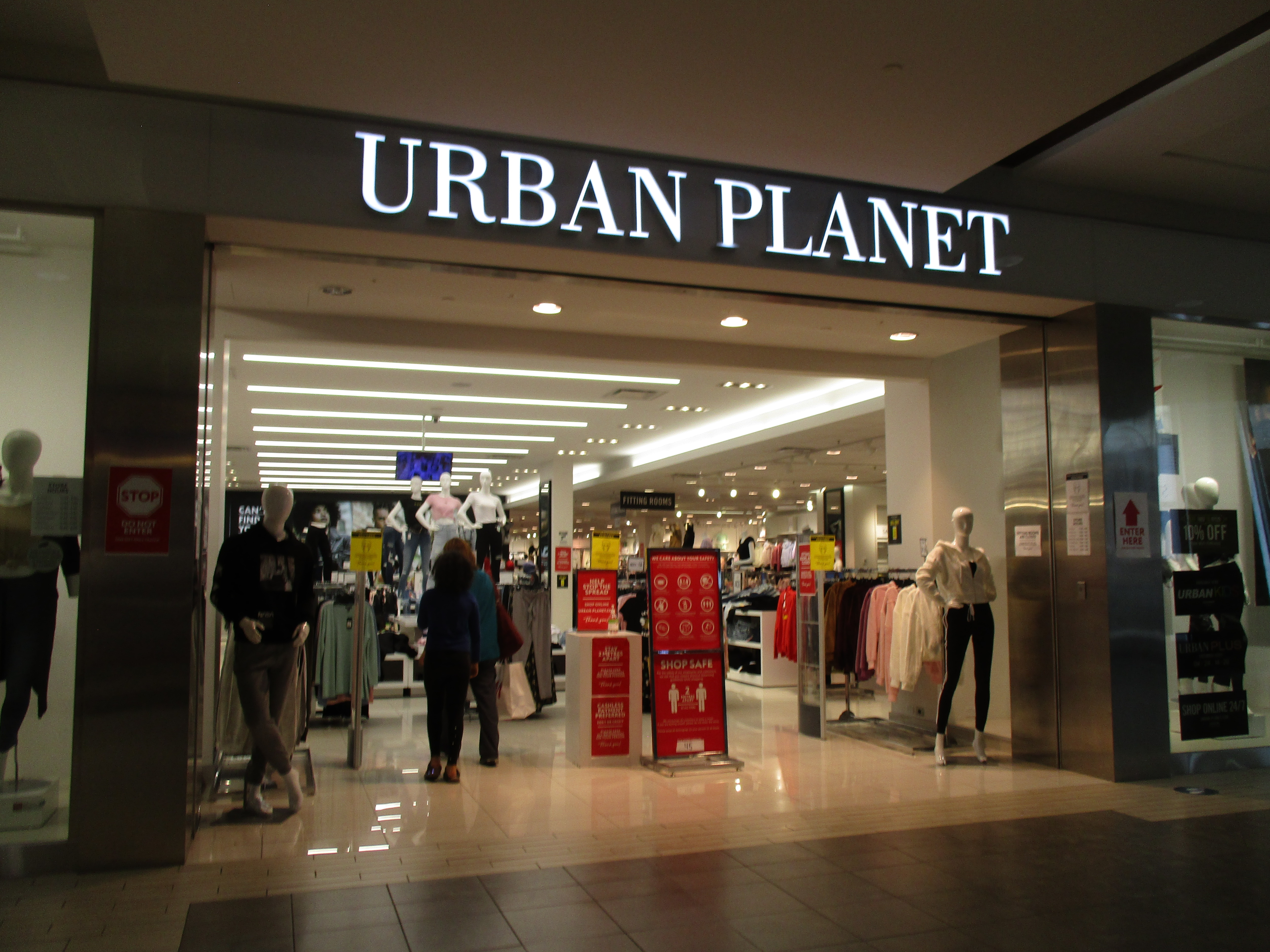
- Urban Planet at Kingsway Mall in Edmonton, Alberta, Canada.
- Type: Subsidiary
- Industry: Apparel
- Founded: 1989
- Headquarters: Toronto, Ontario, Canada
- Number of locations: 100+
- Products: Men's and women's clothing, jeans, shoes, and fashion accessories.
- Parent: YM Inc.
- Subsidiaries: Urban Behavior; Urban Kids; Forever 21
- Website: https://urban-planet.com/

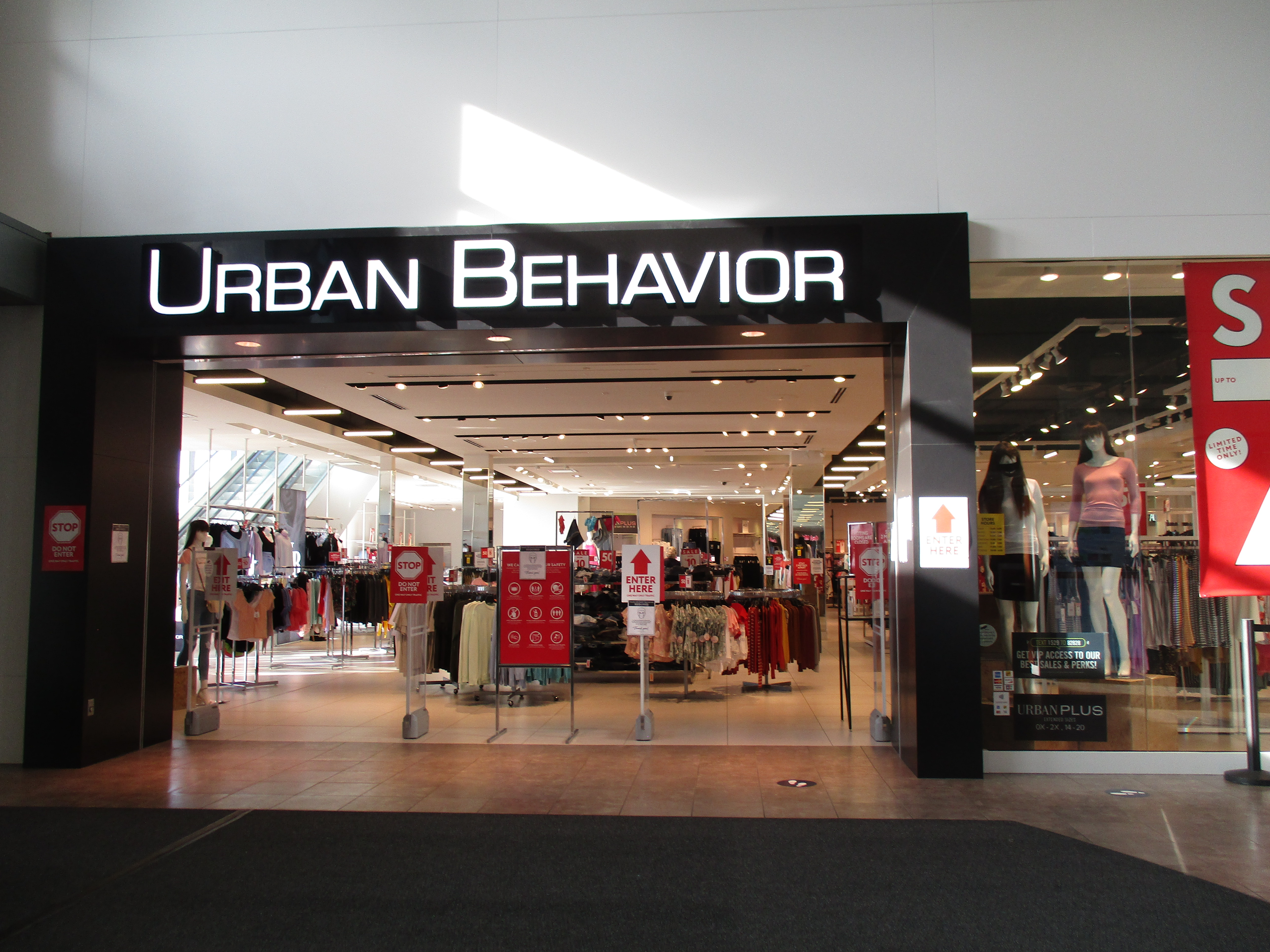
Former Urban Behavior at Kingsway Mall in Edmonton, Alberta, Canada.

Urban Planet, also known as Urban Behavior, is a unisex apparel retailer in Canada with a focus on clothes for young adults and teenagers. A fast fashion chain, it is a subsidiary of YM Inc which owns as well Bluenotes and West 49.

The store is mostly popular with people trying to keep up with today's fashion trends. Urban Planet targets teenage to young adult consumers with focus on affordability. It has over 100 locations across Canada.

== History ==
Urban Behavior logo.

Urban Planet and Urban Behavior have stores located across Canada, the eastern United States, and formerly the Middle East. All mall-based stores operate as unisex locations. The outlet locations in Toronto were divided along male and female clothing lines.

In July 2008, CMT America Corporation, Urban Behavior's corporate parent in the United States, filed for Chapter 11 bankruptcy. Many of the US stores have subsequently been closed. The company has maintained its Canadian stores and continues a wholesale presence in the United States. In June 2011, CMT Canada, Urban Behavior's corporate parent, filed a Notice of Intention to Make a Proposal (“NOI”) pursuant to the provisions of the Bankruptcy and Insolvency Act (“BIA”). The NOI is a restructuring process and did not proceed to a liquidation or bankruptcy of the retailer. Approximately 24 of the existing 120 store locations across Canada were planned to be closed by August 31. Urban Planet opened a store in New York in 2017.

YM Inc. acquired Urban Behaviour in 2011 and had previously acquired Urban Planet years earlier. Urban Behavior was founded in 1989 by Arif Noor. It is now a sister brand of Urban Planet, with 22 stores in Canada as of February 2021. Following the closure of Forever 21 stores in Canada, Urban Planet carries Forever 21 clothing items inside their stores and online. Urban Planet also carries children clothes under the Urban Kids banner, and accessories.

After the Hudson's Bay Company closed all its stores, 14 of the properties were taken over by YM Inc. for its banners Urban Planet and Urban Behavior. Five of these locations were acquired directly from the Hudson's Bay Company during its liquidation process and were all formerly occupied by a Saks Off 5th store.

== Controversies ==
The chain has had controversies in the past. In 2016, the store was under fire for firing an employee after she had an allergic reaction on the job. In 2019, Urban Planet apologized after a racially insensitive word was used on merchandise.
