= Lukfook =

Hong Kong jewelry corporation

Lukfook Group Holdings
- Native name: 六福集團
- Type: listed company (SEHK: 590)
- Industry: Jewellery; Retail
- Headquarters: Hong Kong
- Key people: Founder: Wong Wai Sheung (Chairman & Chief Executive)
- Website: http://www.lukfook.com

Luk Fook Holdings (International) Limited
- Traditional Chinese: 六福集團(國際)有限公司
- Simplified Chinese: 六福集团(国际)有限公司
Transcriptions
Standard Mandarin
- Hanyu Pinyin: Liù Fú Jítuán (Guójì) Yǒuxiàngōngsī
Yue: Cantonese
- Jyutping: luk6 fuk1 zaap6 tyun4 (gwok3 zai3) jau5 haan6 gung1 si1

Lukfook Jewellery
- Traditional Chinese: 六福珠寶
- Simplified Chinese: 六福珠宝
Transcriptions
Standard Mandarin
- Hanyu Pinyin: Liù Fú Zhūbǎo
Yue: Cantonese
- Jyutping: luk6 fuk1 zyu1 bou2

Luk Fook Holdings (International) Limited (Chinese: 六福集團(國際)有限公司) (Stock Code: 0590) principally engages in the sourcing, designing, wholesaling, trademark licensing and retailing of a variety of gold and platinum jewellery and gem-set jewellery. They were listed on the Main Board of The Stock Exchange of Hong Kong Limited in May 1997, and the Group has tapped into the mid to high-end watch market in recent years.

The Group's revenue and operating profit for FY2023-24 reached approximately HK$15.326 billion and HK$2.041 billion respectively. As of January 16, 2025, the market capitalisation of the group is HK$8.23 billion.

The head office is in Metropole Square (新都廣場) in Sha Tin, Hong Kong.

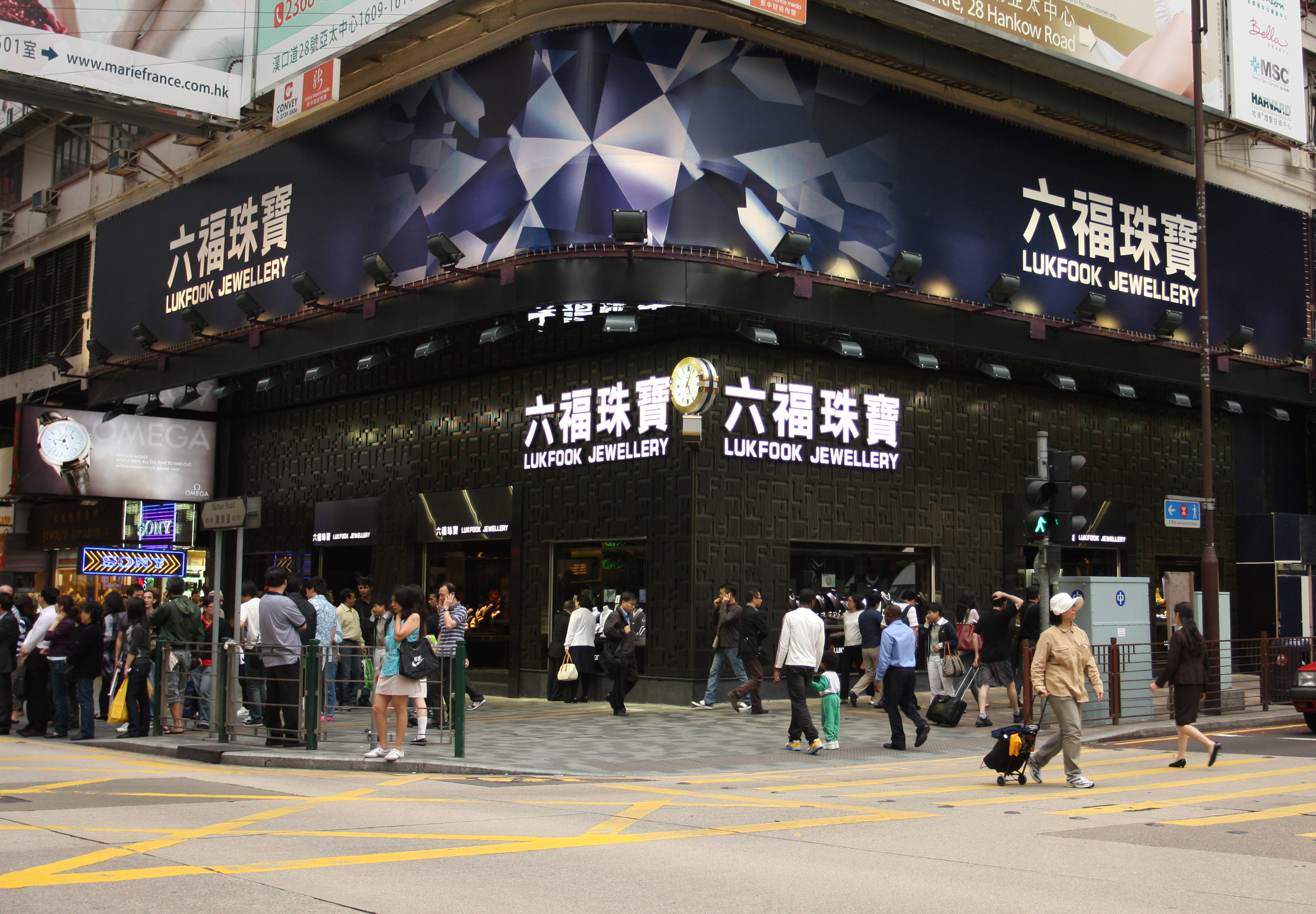
“Lukfook Jewellery” flagship store in Tsim Sha Tsui, Hong Kong

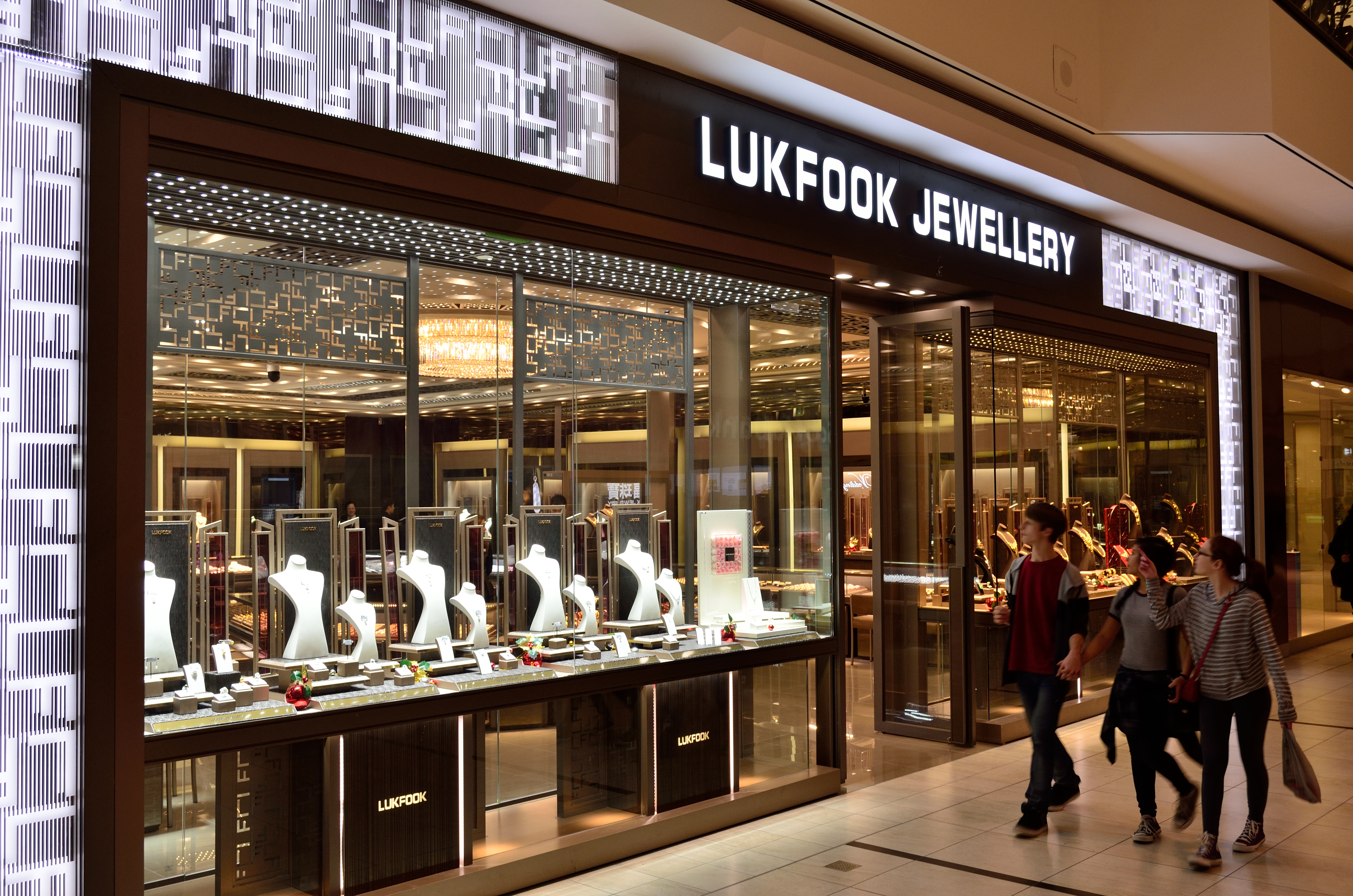
Lukfook store in Canada

As of January 2024, the Group had a total of over 3,240 shops in Mainland China.

== History ==
- 1991: Opened the first "Lukfook Jewellery" retail shop in North Point, Hong Kong. Miss Pauline Yeung was one of the shareholders.
- 1994: Opened the first retail shop in Guangdong Province, Mainland China.
- 1996: Set up "China Gems Laboratory Limited" in Hong Kong. The Laboratory passed the ISO 17025 in Jadeite Authentication, Diamond Testing and Gold Testing in 2005, 2009 and 2015 respectively. It also met the ISO 9001 Quality Management Systems Requirements.
- 1997: Listed on the Main Board of The Stock Exchange of Hong Kong Limited (Stock Code: 0590).
- 2000: Established the jewellery portal.
- 2001: Approximately 70 retail shops.
- 2002: Opened the first shop in Macau. Acquired a piece of land with a total area of 350,000 square feet in Panyu, Guangzhou to set up a jewellery processing plant in the "Luk Fook Jewellery Garden".
- 2003: Obtained the sole-proprietorship license in Mainland China. Opened the first retail shop in Canada.
- 2006: Established the first shop in the United States.
- 2010: Established the first shop in Singapore.
- 2011: Official opening of Luk Fook Jewellery Centre, headquarters of the Group, in Jordan, Hong Kong. Commencement of Phase II of the jewellery processing plant expansion works in the Luk Fook Jewellery Garden.
- 2014: Announce the acquisition of 50% interest in CGS.
- 2015: Entered into a three-year sightholder rough diamond sales contract with De Beers Group of Companies ("De Beers"), the world's largest diamond producer by value and becoming one of the 84 sightholders of De Beers around the globe.
- 2016: Lukfook Jewellery Expands into Malaysia with shops in Kuala Lumpur
- 2016: Opening of the Second "Lukfook Jewellery" Shop in New York, the United States
- 2016: Lukfook Jewellery Open a Retail Outlet in Shinsegae Main Store in Seoul, Korea
- 2017: Opening of the Second "Lukfook Jewellery" Shop in San Francisco, the United States
- 2018: Lukfook Jewellery at CF Markville in Canada was close temporarily after being robbed.
- 2018: Lukfook Jewellery Expands into Cambodia with Grand Opening of Flagship Store in Phnom Penh.

== See also ==
- Chow Sang Sang
- The Future Rocks
