= Markville Shopping Centre =

Shopping mall in Markham, Ontario, Canada

CF Markville
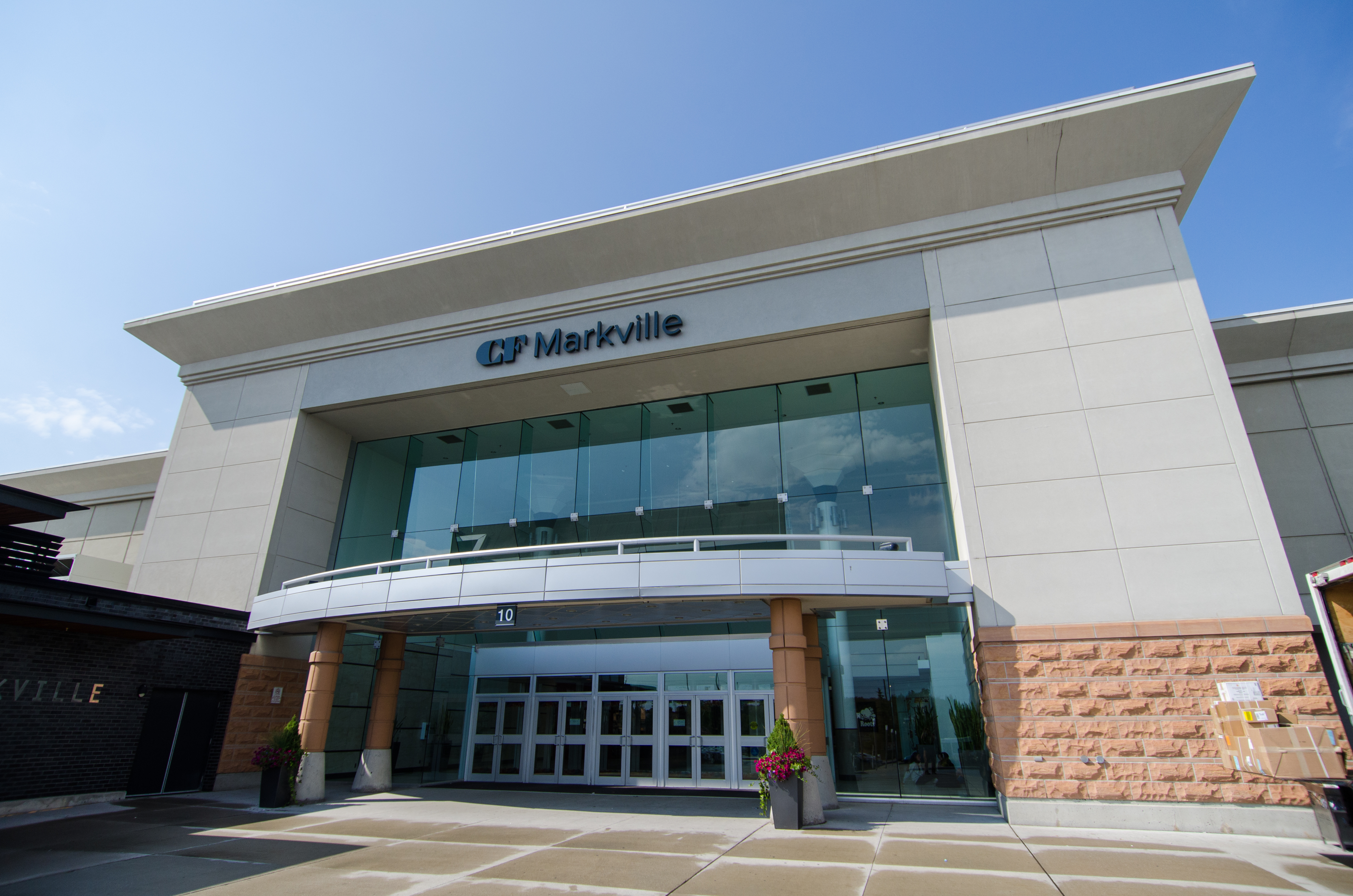
- CF Markville entrance in 2017
- Location: Markham, Ontario, Canada
- Coordinates: 43°52′08″N 79°17′17″W
- Opened: March 17, 1982; 44 years ago
- Developer: JDS Development
- Manager: Cadillac Fairview
- Owner: Cadillac Fairview
- Num. of stores: ≥140
- Num. of anchor tenants: 7
- Floor area: 981,000 square feet (91,100 m^{2})
- Floors: 2
- Public transit: Routes 1 Highway 7, 40 Unionville, 301 Markham Express, 522 Markham Local; Toronto Transit Commission 129
- Website: shops.cadillacfairview.com/property/cf-markville

CF Markville, also known as Markville Shopping Centre and Markville Mall in the Cadillac Fairview chain of malls, is a shopping mall of over 140 stores in Markham, Ontario, Canada. It is located at the intersection of Highway 7 East and McCowan Road, and runs along Bullock Drive, located slightly west of McCowan Road. Its anchors are Winners, Walmart Supercentre, Decathlon, Sporting Life, Marshalls, Uniqlo, and a Best Buy. It has a gross leasable area of 981,000 square feet (91,100 m^{2}). It was the largest shopping mall in York Region until 2004 when Vaughan Mills opened.

== History ==
The shopping centre was developed by JDS Development and opened in 1982. The mall was named for its proximity to the historical villages of Markham and Unionville (now both incorporated in the city of Markham). The name was originally planned to be called Markville Town Centre. The site of the mall was originally a nursery garden. It was once part of the 100 acres Lot 11 for George Eckhart up to 1862 and Eckhart estate thereafter. Once the land was acquired, it was two decades before construction started. High-rises and government buildings were planned to be built around the shopping centre, but the plan was not passed.

The original ground floor featured an artificial waterway and a central reflecting pool with a water fountain that spouted a two storey column. The Pool could be drained for special occasions and in the holiday season would become Santa's Workshop. Among its initial tenants were the Eaton's department store and a Famous Players 4-screen cinema.

The mall was renovated in 1990 as part of an expansion because more American retailers were entering Canada. Hudson's Bay in addition to Simpsons were included in this expansion project and both opened in early October 1990. Simpsons was converted to Sears in 1991. The Sears space was identical to its store in the Mapleview Centre once also occupied by Simpsons. The shopping centre was nearly doubled from 500,000 square feet (46,000 m^{2}) to over 900,000 square feet (84,000 m^{2}) according to the Yellow Pages. The mall is now owned by Cadillac Fairview since 1997.

Best Buy, which opened in 2003, was originally a Miracle Food Mart supermarket. Walmart entered the mall in 1994 with two levels. They expanded their lower level in 2004. The upper level became Winners. Wal-Mart location replaced Woolco.

Markville was renovated by EllisDon for CA$111 million from 2011 to 2013. The renovation coincided with an initiative to add new brands to Canada or the Greater Toronto Area. 206,000 square feet (19,100 m^{2}) of the common area was renovated, including new glass railings, flooring, washrooms, and removing the lower level rivers. 268,000 square feet (24,900 m^{2}) of existing tenant space was renovated with high-end tenants. The renovation included the installation of 180,000 square feet (17,000 m^{2}) of porcelain tile flooring and 12,000 linear feet of glass handrails.

A new 45,000 square feet (4,200 m^{2}) food court known as the "Express Eatery" opened on August 23, 2012, next to the former Sears store on the lower level. The upper-level food court next to Best Buy has been remodelled into shop space. According to EllisDon, this was the most challenging aspect of the renovation.

Sears closed on February 28, 2015. The upper level of the former Sears space opened as Saks Off 5th on March 8, 2018, while the lower level opened as Marshalls on September 24, 2019. Saks Off 5th closed on April 16, 2022, and it was replaced by Decathlon on November 24, 2022.

Sport Chek closed in 2012 and was replaced by Forever 21. Forever 21 closed in Spring 2018 to make way for Japanese retailer Uniqlo to open in its Canadian expansion, one of the four new locations in Canada. Uniqlo opened on October 12, 2018.

A few Chinese retailers have opened in the mall, including Hong Kong–based Lukfook Jewellery, Osim, and Mainland China–based Miniso.

On April 5, 2021, Porsche Centre Markham, located at the intersection of McCowan Road & Bullock Drive, which is located just outside the mall near Saks Off 5th, officially commenced operations.

Decathlon opened on November 25, 2022 on the 2nd floor above Marshalls where Saks Off 5th used to be located. Old Navy closed on January 24, 2024. Indigo opened on October 5, 2024 on the 1st floor across from Sporting Life where the Old Navy used to be located. Hudson's Bay closed on June 1, 2025. Decathlon closed on July 31, 2025, Toys "R" Us and Babies "R" Us later closed on August 24, 2025.

On September 4, 2026, T&T Supermarket announced plans to open a location at CF Markville in the former Hudson's Bay space, with an opening planned for 2028.

== Transportation access ==
The mall is accessible by York Region Transit (YRT)/Viva, Toronto Transit Commission and GO Transit.

Most YRT routes stop close to the mall on the southside with only VIVA buses stopping along Highway 7. TTC route also stops on McCowan Road. GO Transit buses stop along Bullock Drive and GO Centennial riders on the Stouffville rail line need to walk along Bullock from east of McCowan to access the mall.

== Gallery ==
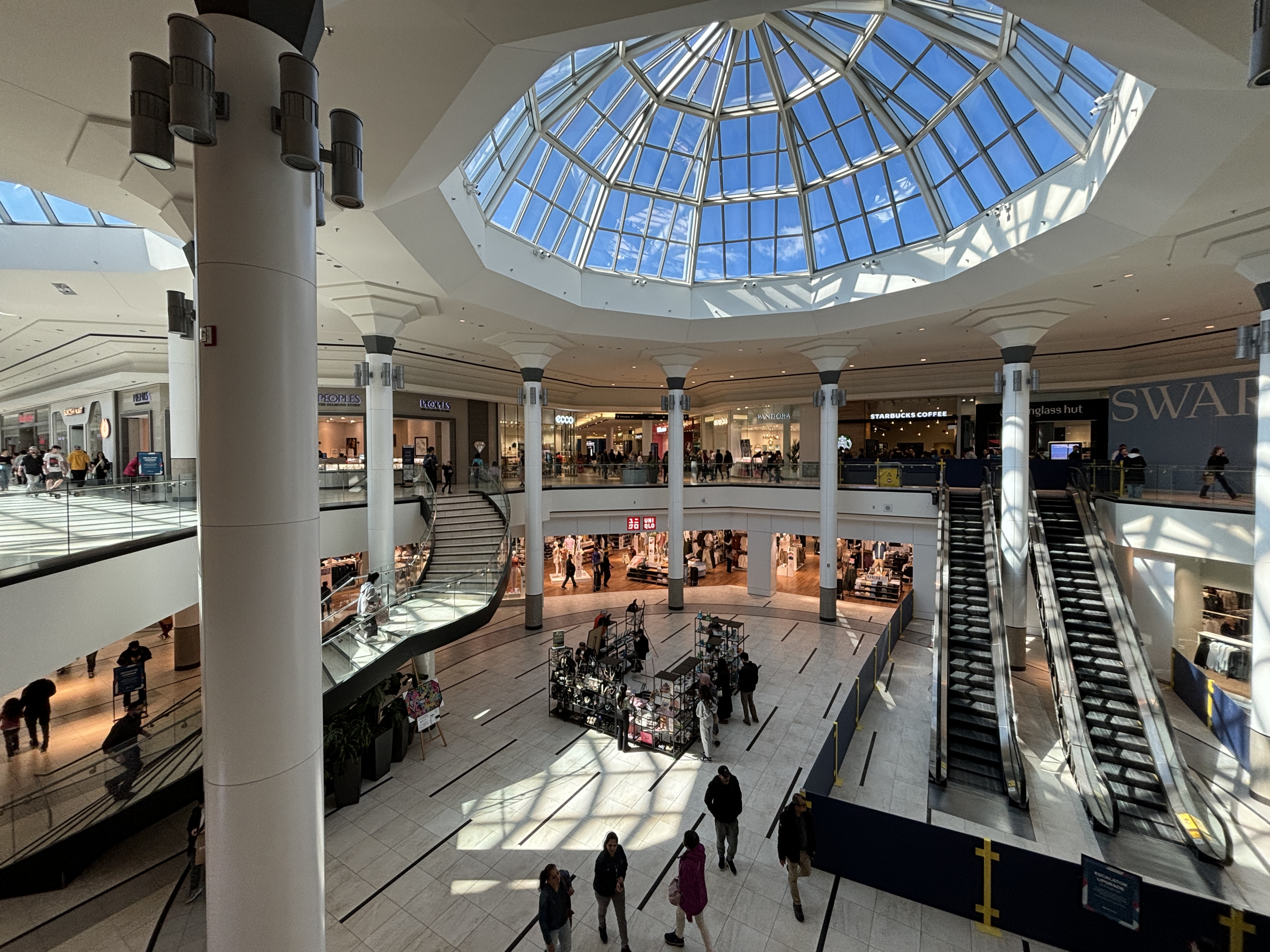
CF Markville Atrium

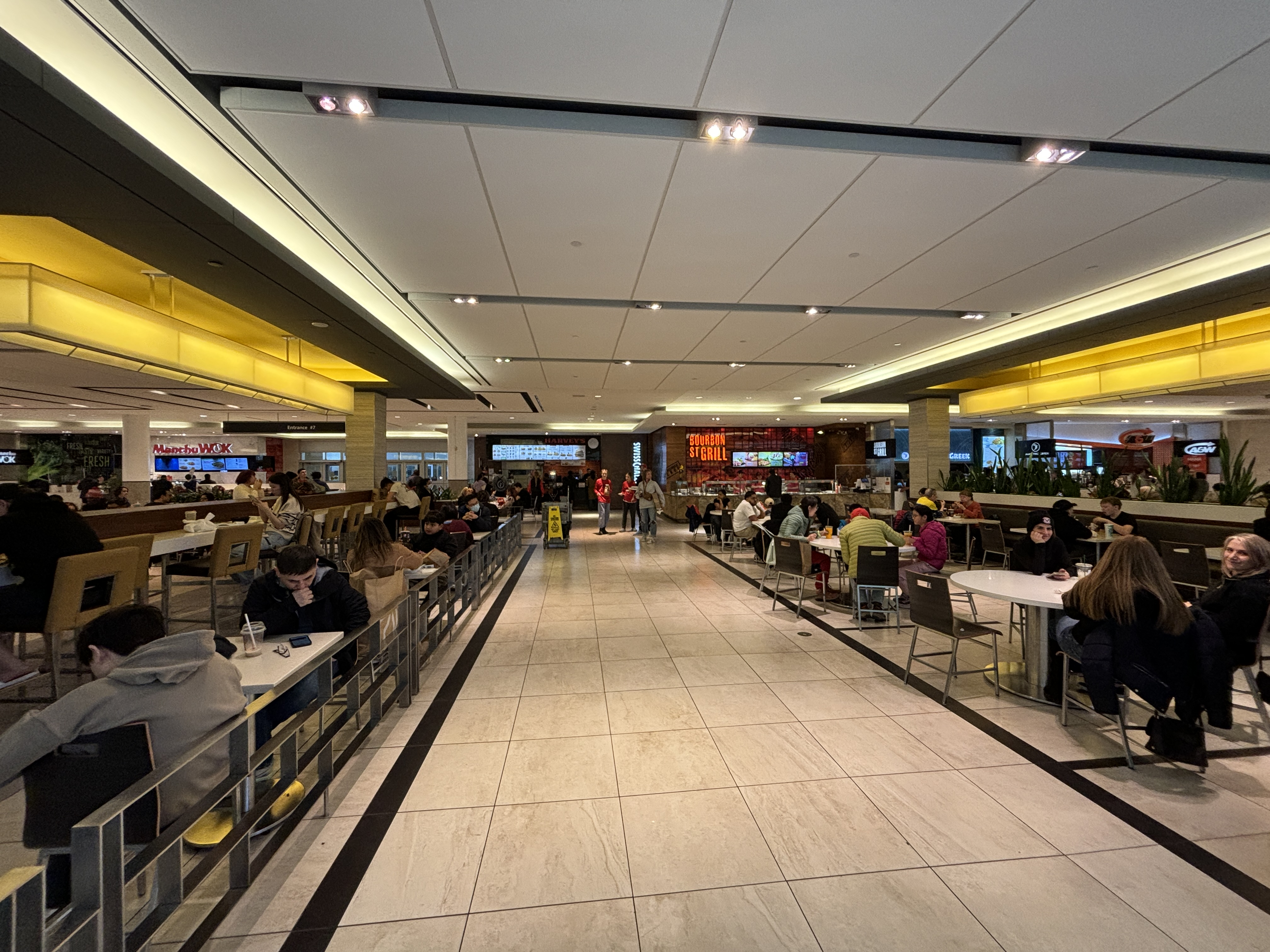
Food Hall

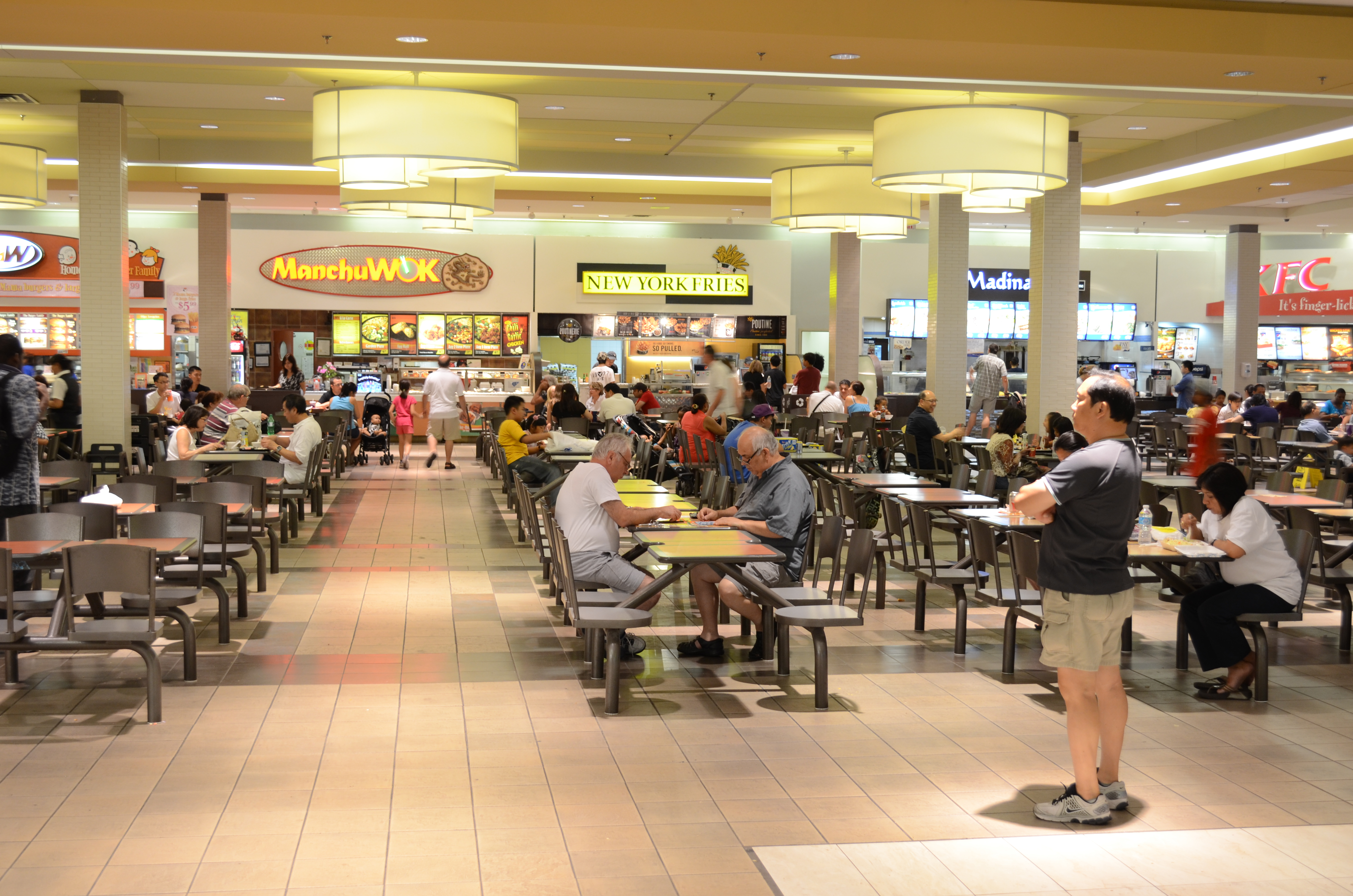
Old CF Markville food court before it was relocated in 2012

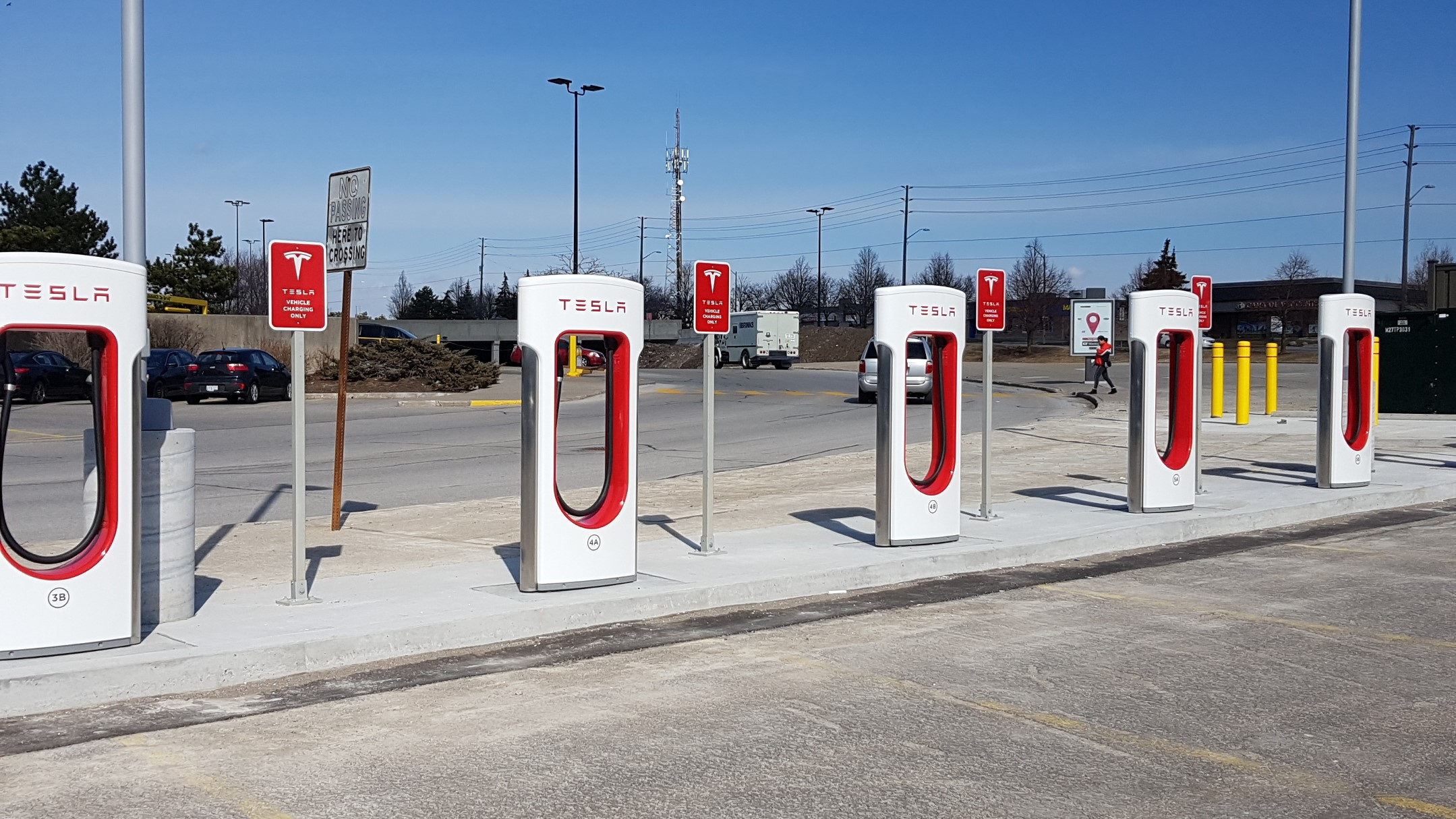
Tesla Chargers in CF Markville

=== Anchors ===
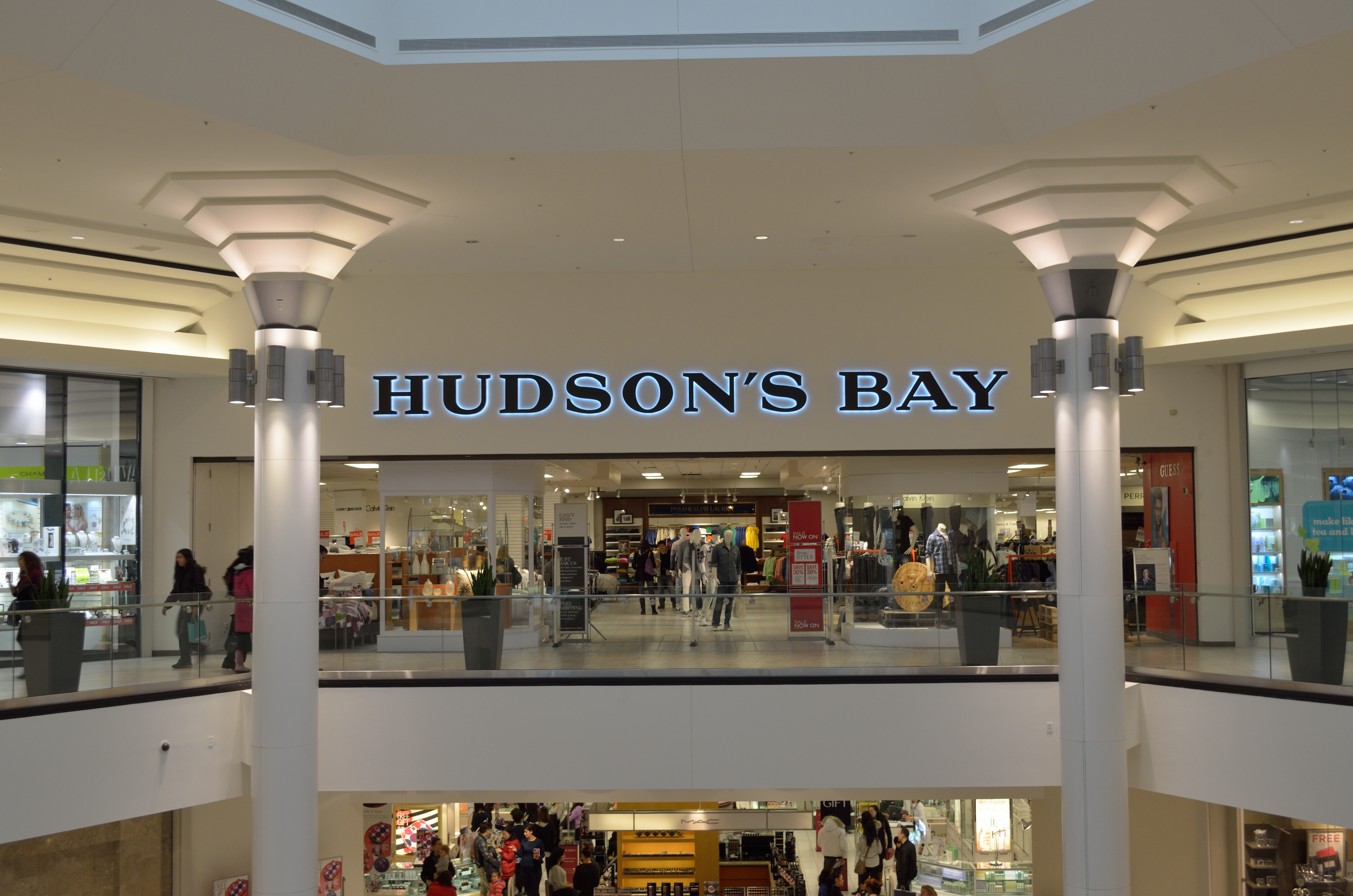
Mall entrance of former Hudson's Bay

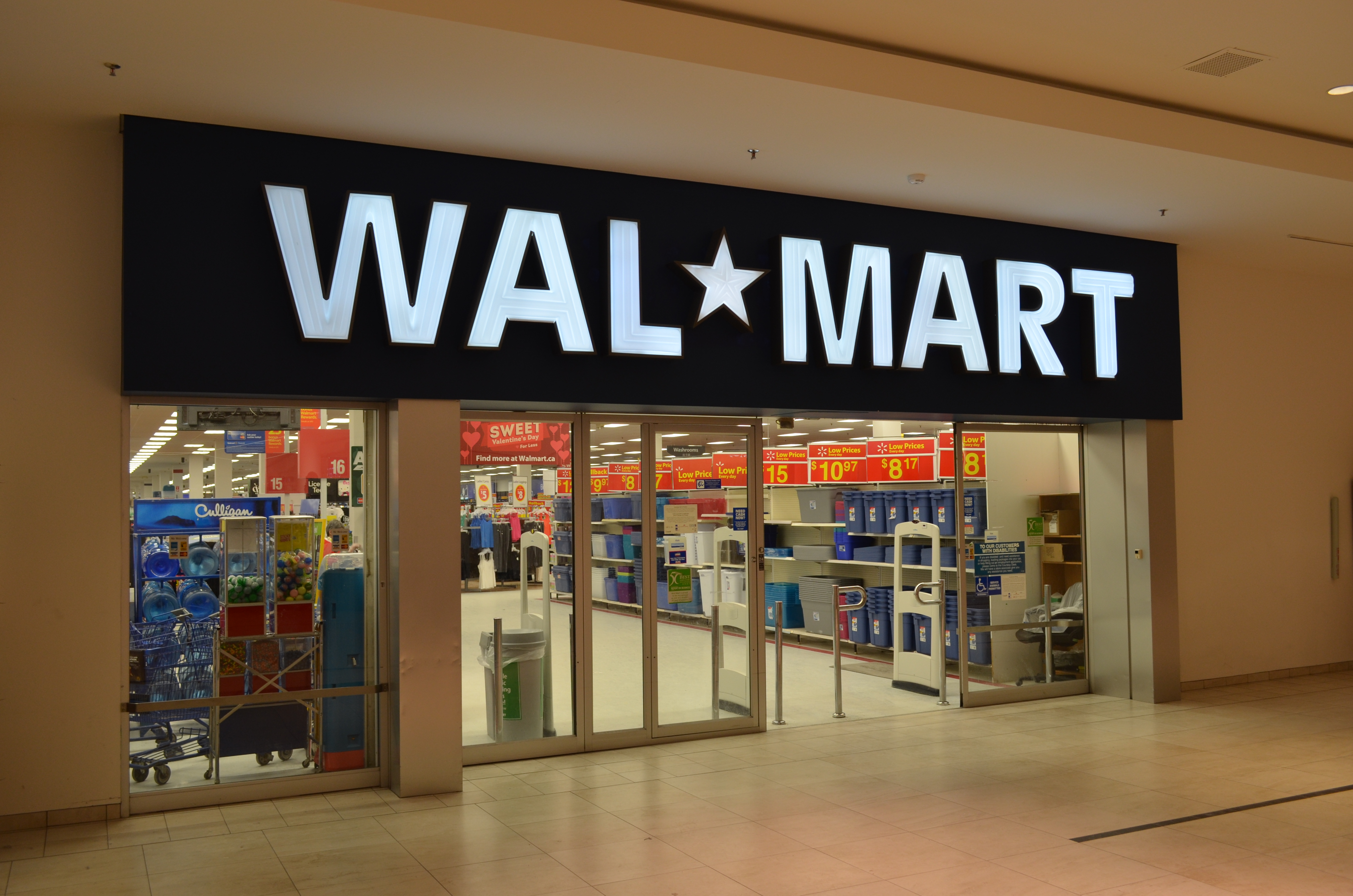
View of the mall entrance (lower floor) for Walmart with old logo

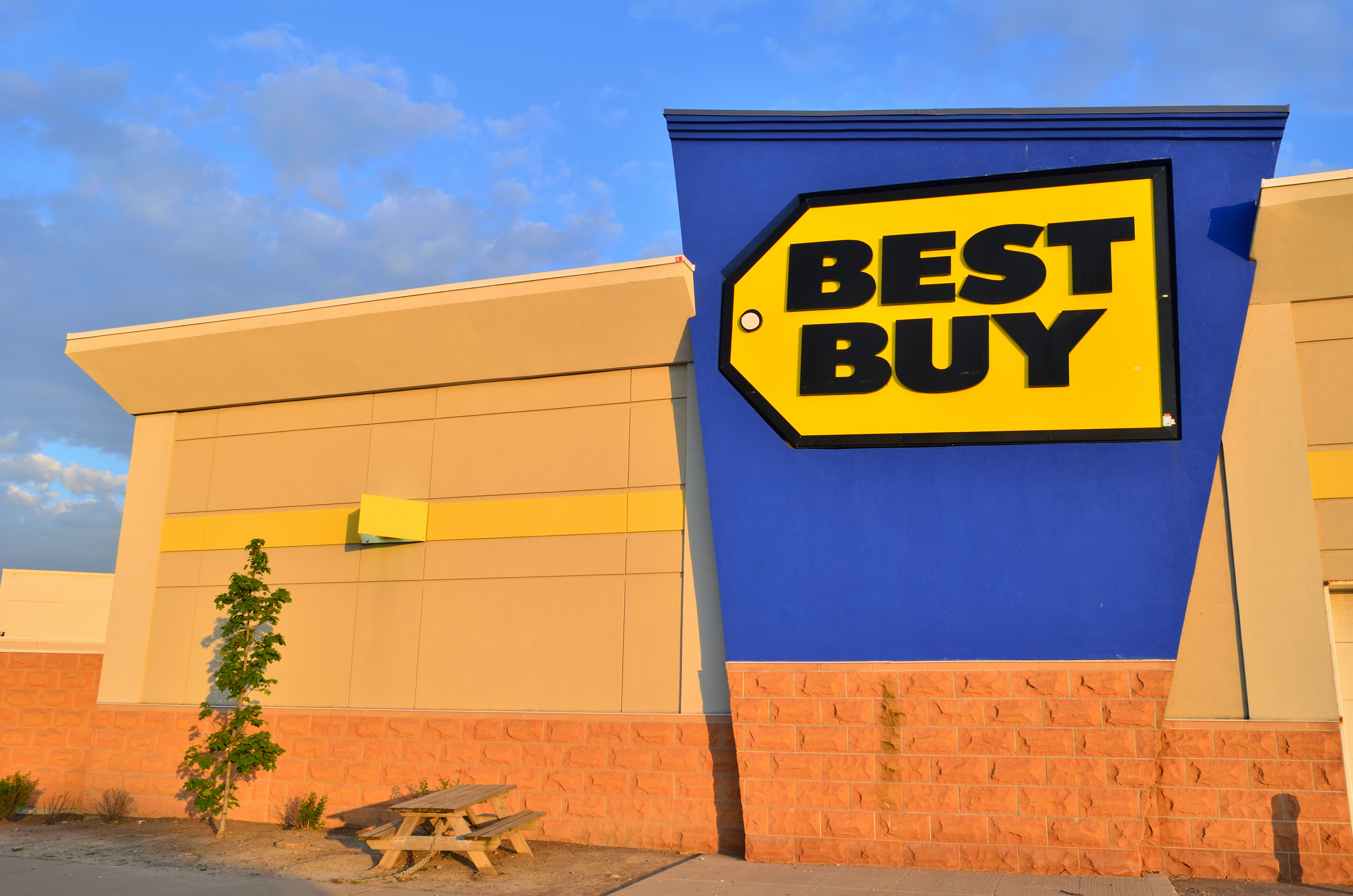
Best Buy

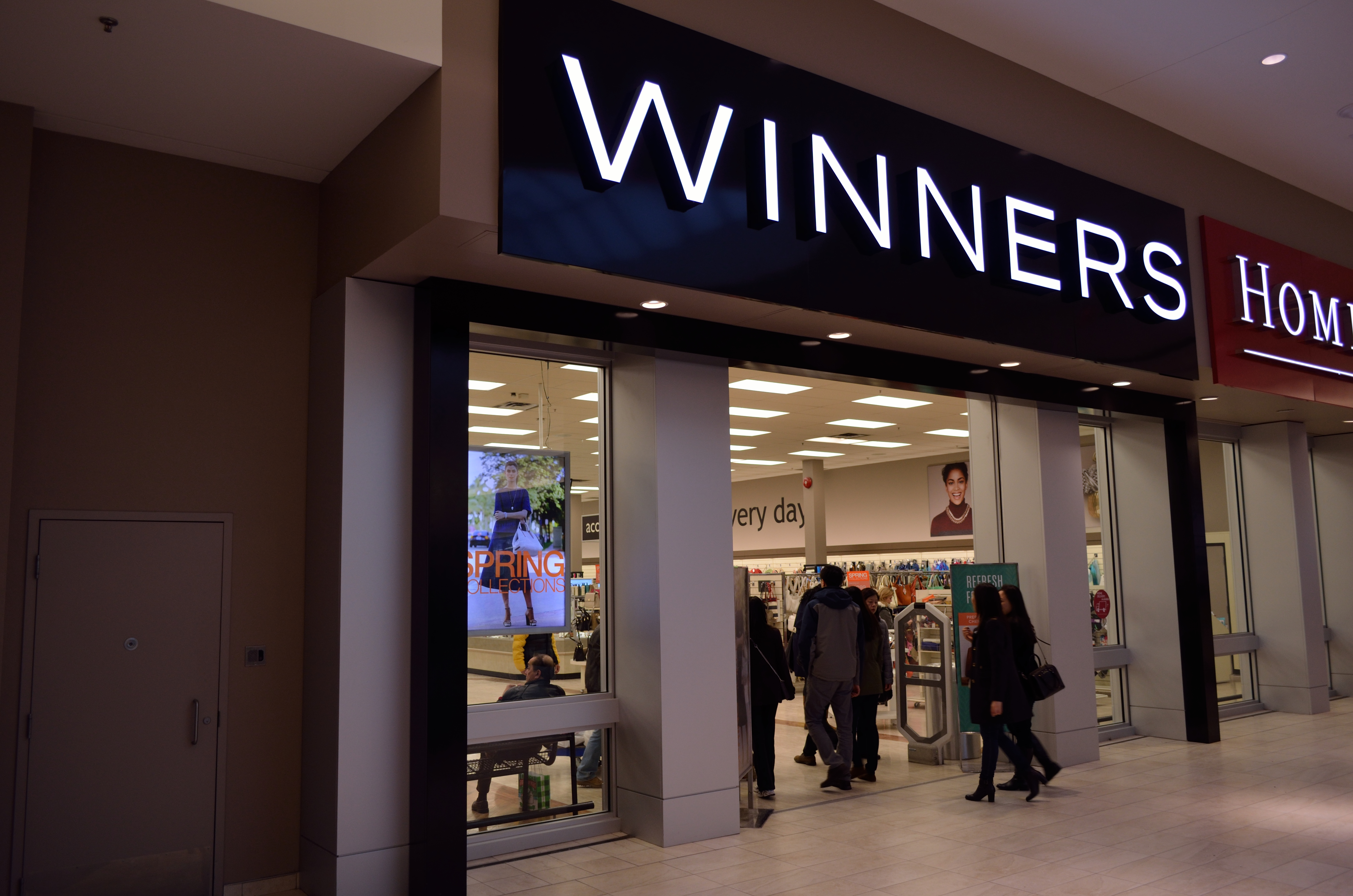
Winners and HomeSense

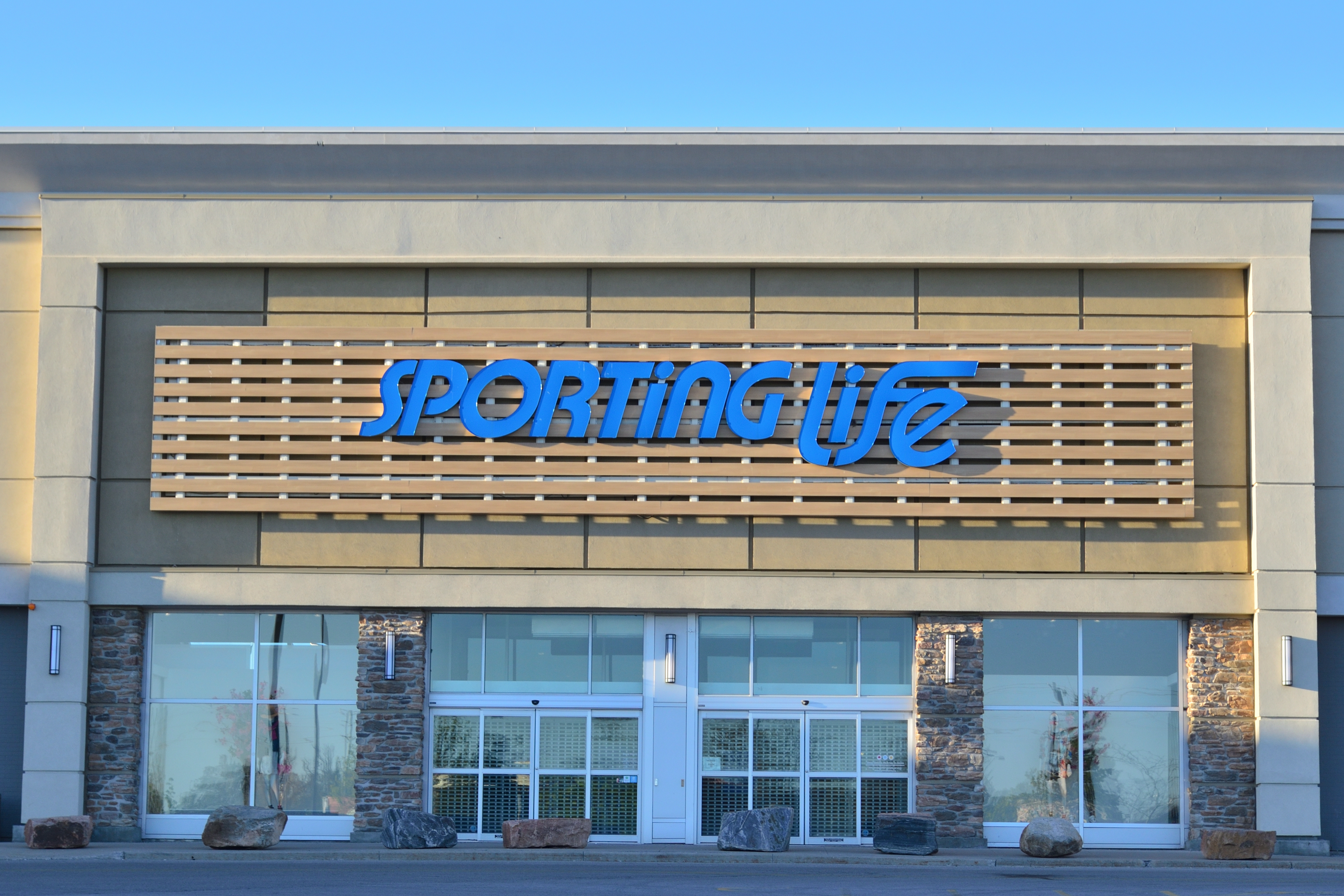
Sporting Life

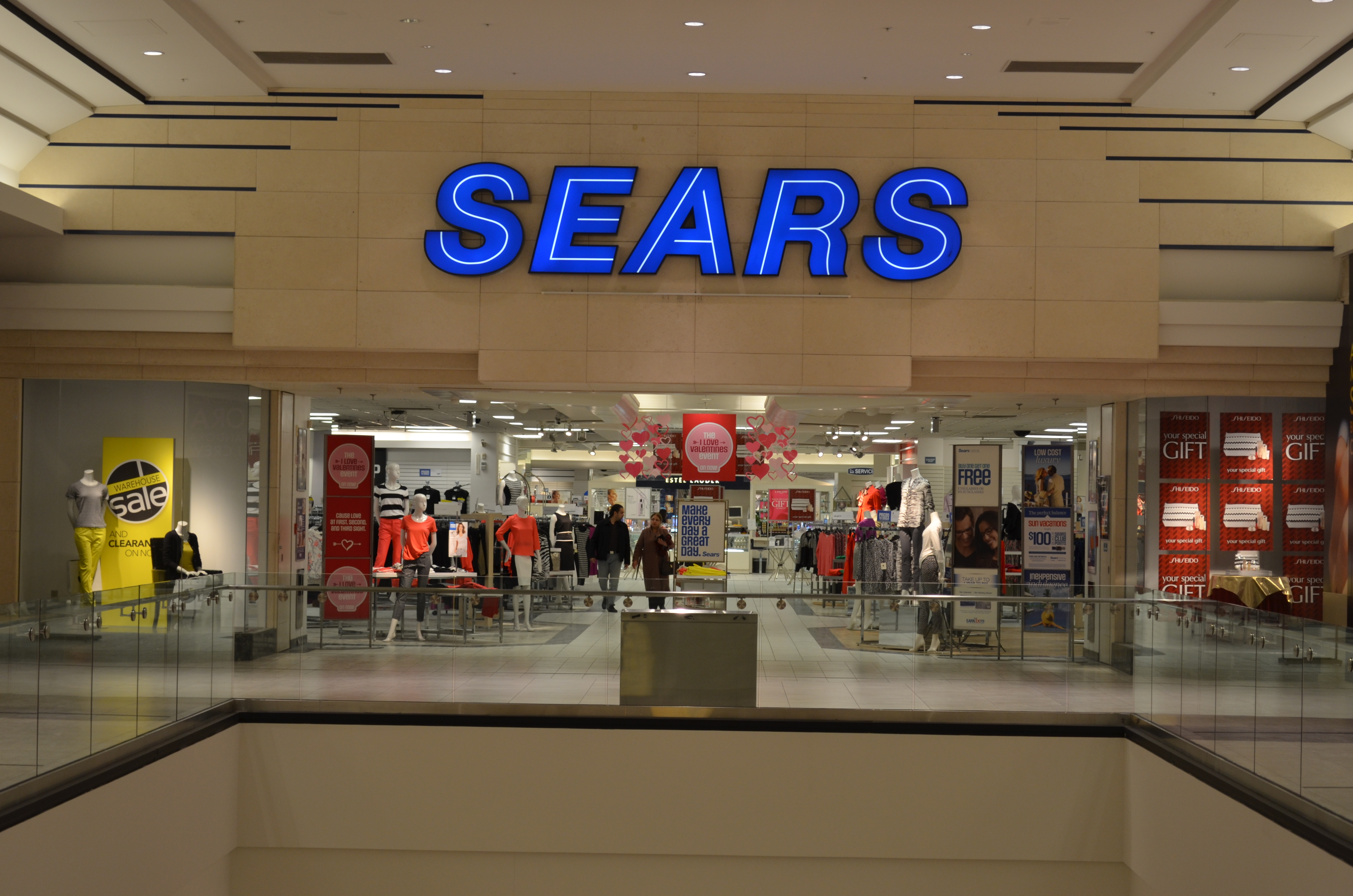
Former Sears Canada mall entrance

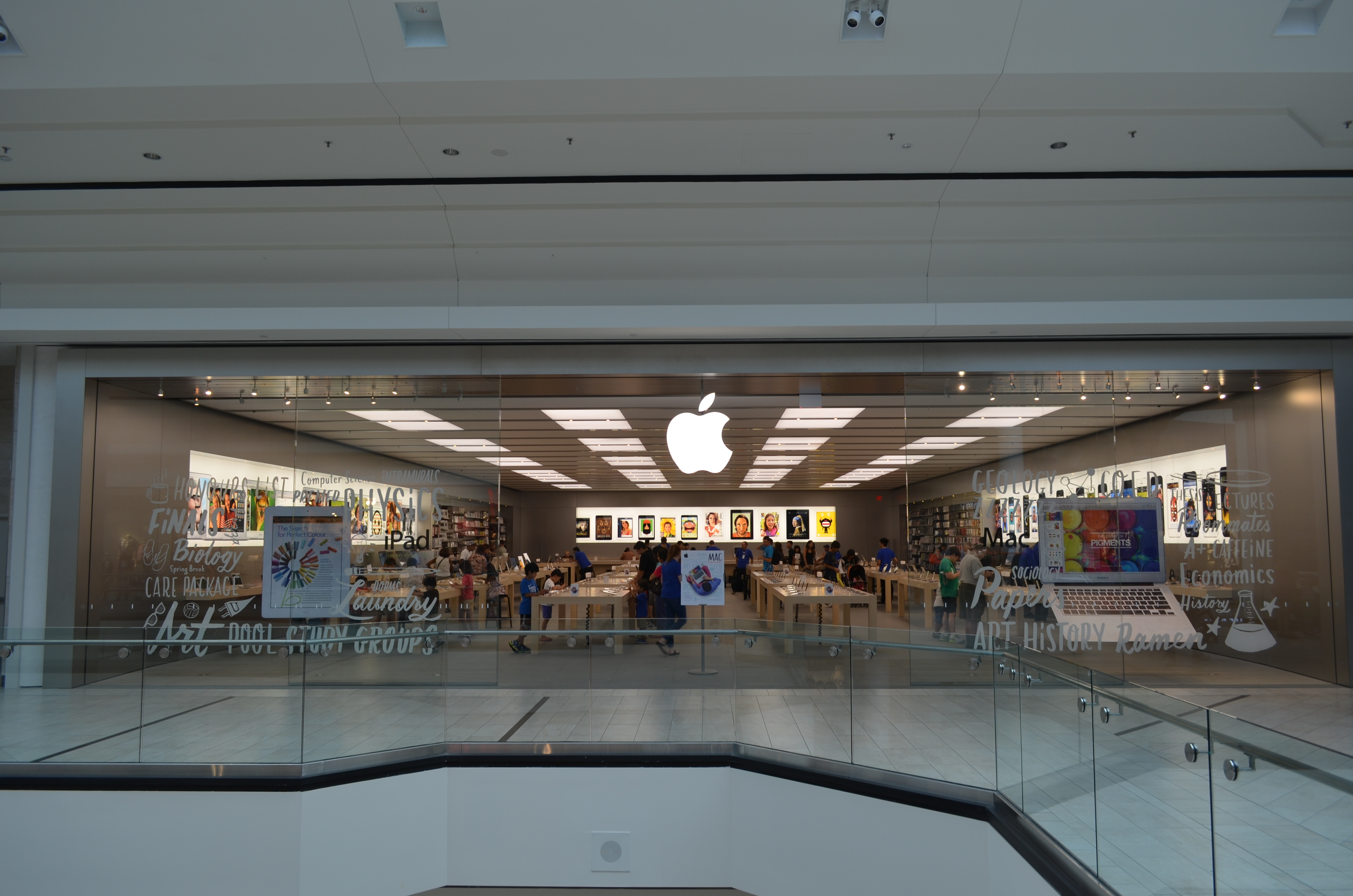
Apple Store

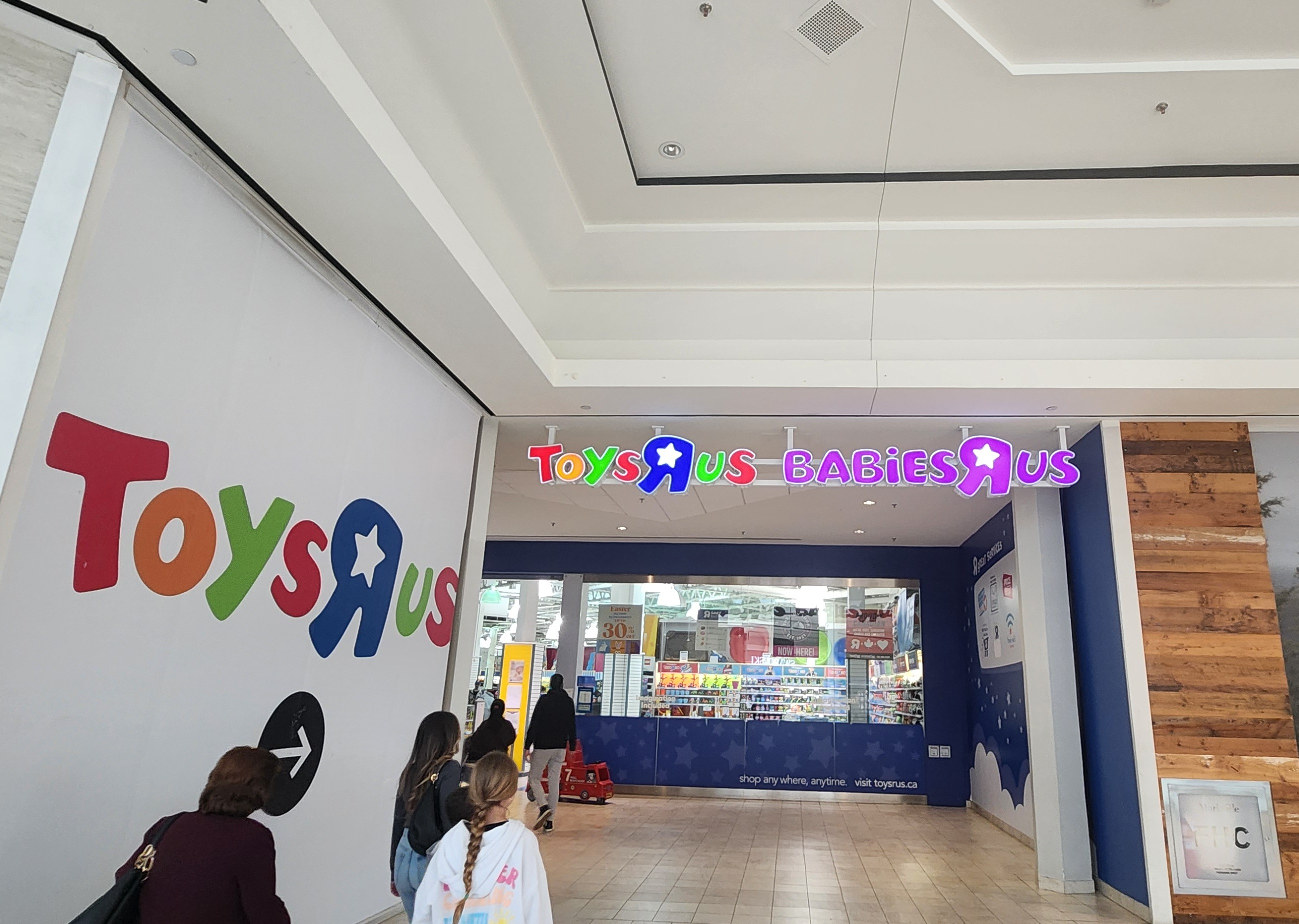
Former Toys "R" Us Canada/Babies "R" Us Canada

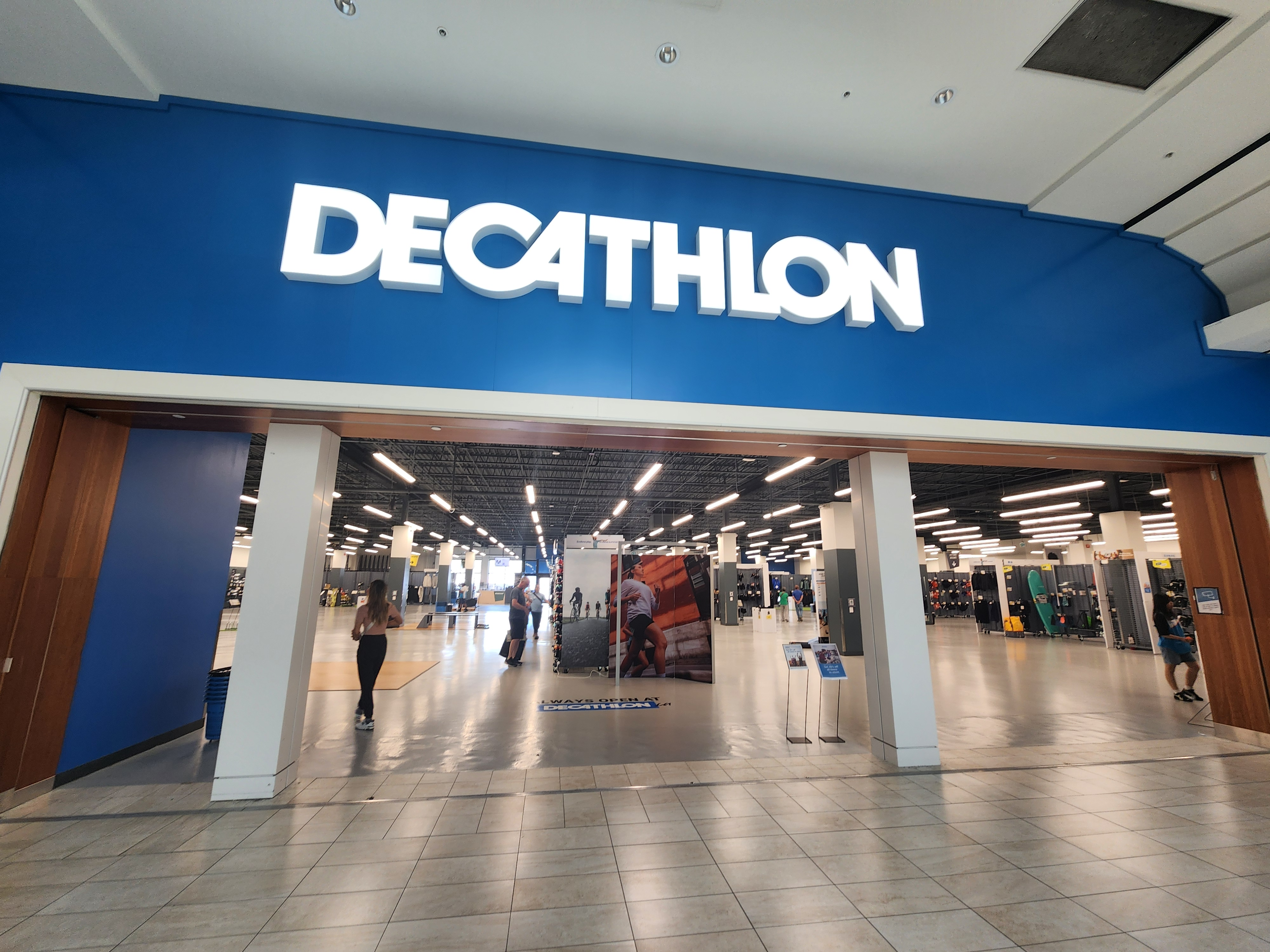
Former Decathlon

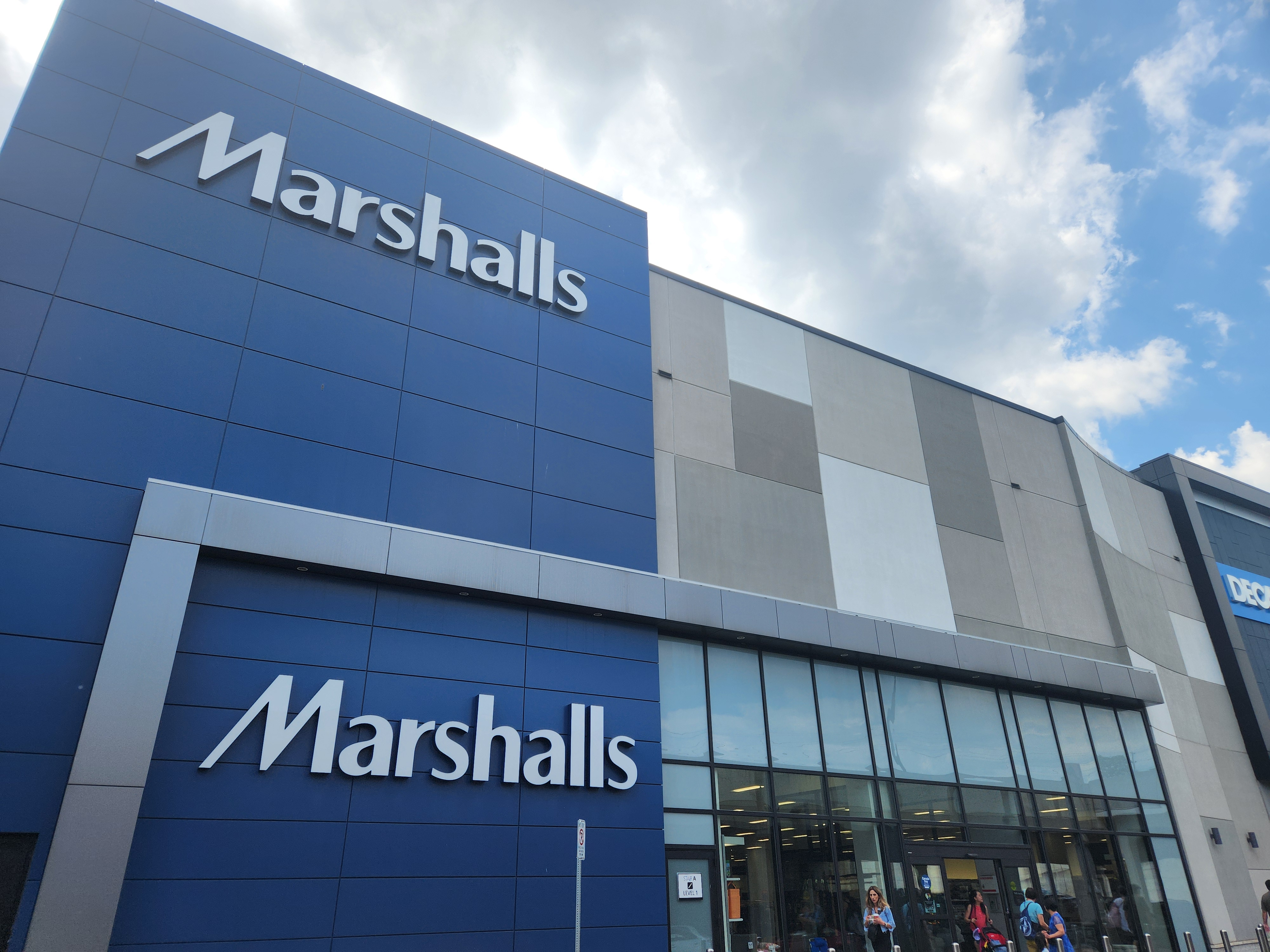
Marshalls

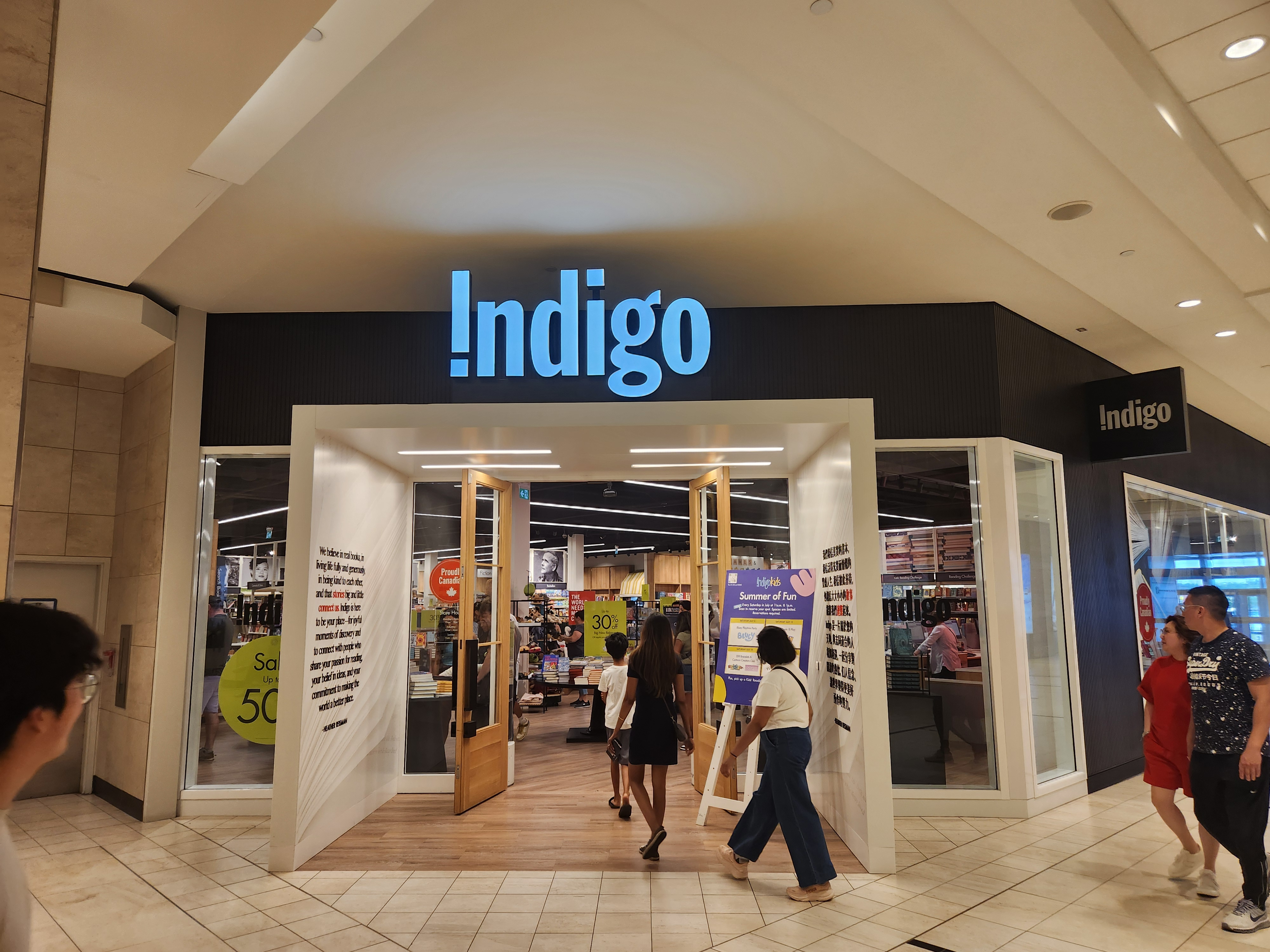
Indigo

== See also ==
- List of largest shopping centres in Canada
- List of shopping malls in Canada
