= Hillcrest Mall =

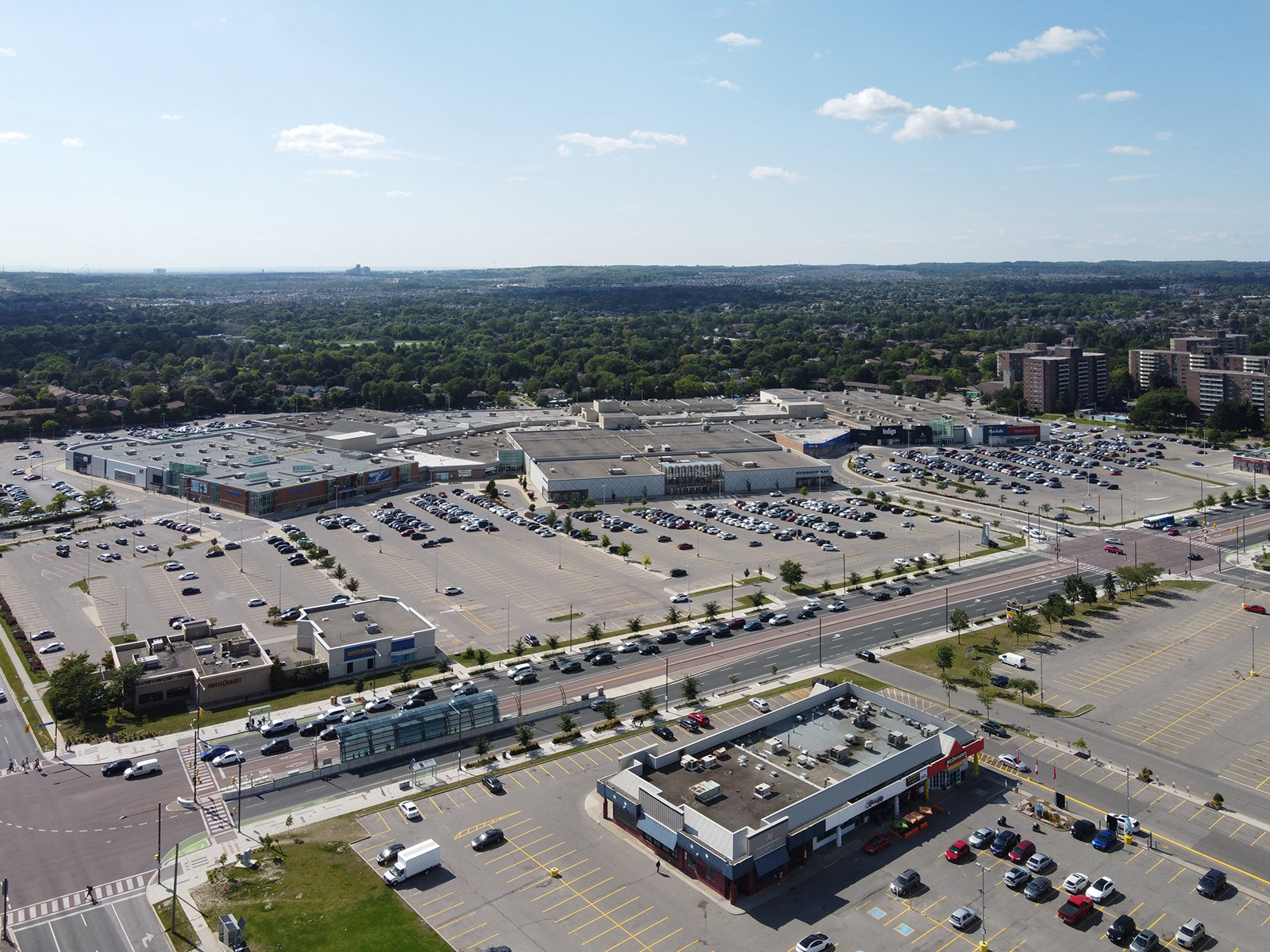
- Aerial view of Hillcrest Mall in 2023
- Location: 9350 Yonge St, Richmond Hill, Ontario, Canada, L4C 5G2
- Coordinates: 43.85443°N 79.43463°W
- Opened: 8 August 1974
- Developer: Cadillac Fairview
- Manager: Oxford Properties
- Num. of stores: 135
- Num. of anchor tenants: 3
- Floor area: 54,419 m^{2} (585,758 sq ft)
- Floors: 1

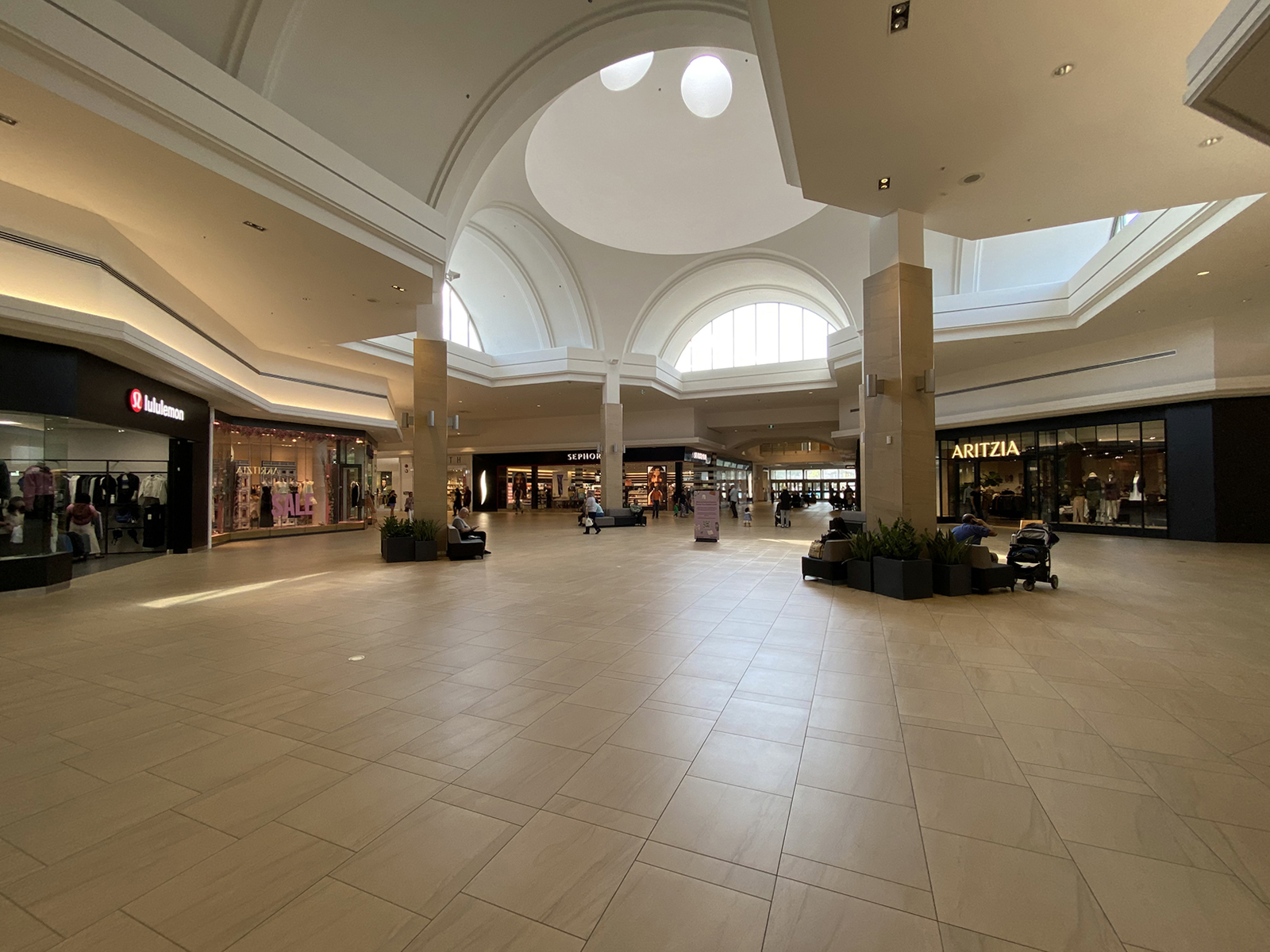
Atrium of the mall

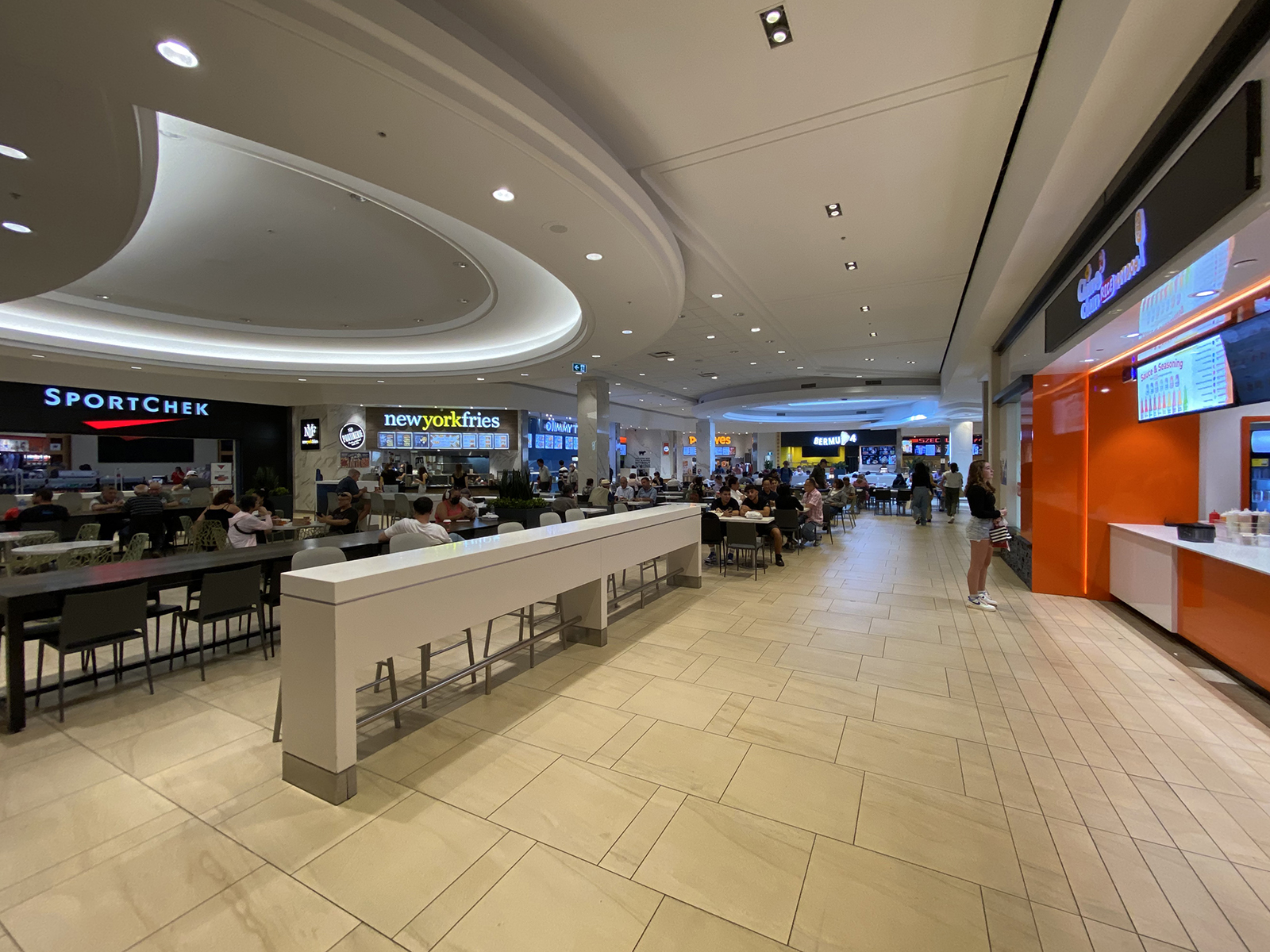
Food Court of the mall

Hillcrest Mall, or Hillcrest, is a 54,419-square-metre (585,758 sq ft) enclosed shopping centre located in the city of Richmond Hill, Ontario, Canada, on the northwest corner of Yonge Street and Carrville Road. It has 135 shops, services, and restaurants.

== History ==
Hillcrest Mall was built on a 19-hectare (46-acre) lot on the northwest corner of Yonge Street and Carrville Road. Architectural drawings were produced by Bregman and Hamann, and the interior design by Robert Meiklejohn. The project was a joint venture of Cadillac Fairview and Greater York Group. Lighting at the mall was designed with input from the David Dunlap Observatory to mitigate light pollution. This included minimal signage, shielded lights in the parking lot, and a light-absorbing parking lot surface.

It opened on August 8, 1974 with four anchor stores: Simpsons, Kmart, Sears, and Loblaws supermarket. It had over 100 stores occupying 50,000 m^{2} (540,000 sq ft) at its grand opening, during which the first 10,000 Simpsons patrons received a rose, a symbolic gesture reflecting Richmond Hill's past status as the rose growing capital of Canada. Simpsons also used a rose in its local advertising. Hillcrest Mall also held a draw, the winner of which was given a two-week all expenses paid trip to Mexico.

The central square featured four ficus trees imported from Florida under a vaulted ceiling. The market court was a food court with picnic seating and gaslight lamps. A 250-seat auditorium with stage and kitchen was also part of the design, and was made available for community activities. The auditorium was used for fashion shows.

A five auditorium movie theatre operated by Cineplex Odeon Corporation opened in October 1980, with a total seating capacity of 519; this space is now a GoodLife Fitness.

Hudson's Bay Company (HBC) acquired Simpsons in 1978, and by 1991 had rebranded the anchor store as The Bay. Zellers opened in the mall in 1988 in the former Sears location after Sears moved to the nearby Promenade Mall. In 1998, the Kmart location at the north end of the mall rebranded to Zellers and HBC leased the retail space previously occupied by Zellers at the southern end of the mall and used it for Hudson Bay's Men's Store and Home while the main store renamed to "Fashion Store".

The mall underwent extensive renovations in 2000. In late 2002, construction of a separate building in the northeast corner of the mall's parking lot was completed; it was the site of the second Krispy Kreme franchise in Canada until 2005, and later Panera Bread. It was demolished in October 2026 in preparation for a planned residential development on the site. In 2006, a farmers' market was established on the premises, operating from the mall's parking lot two days a week.

Oxford Properties bought Hillcrest Mall from Cadillac Fairview in April 2011.

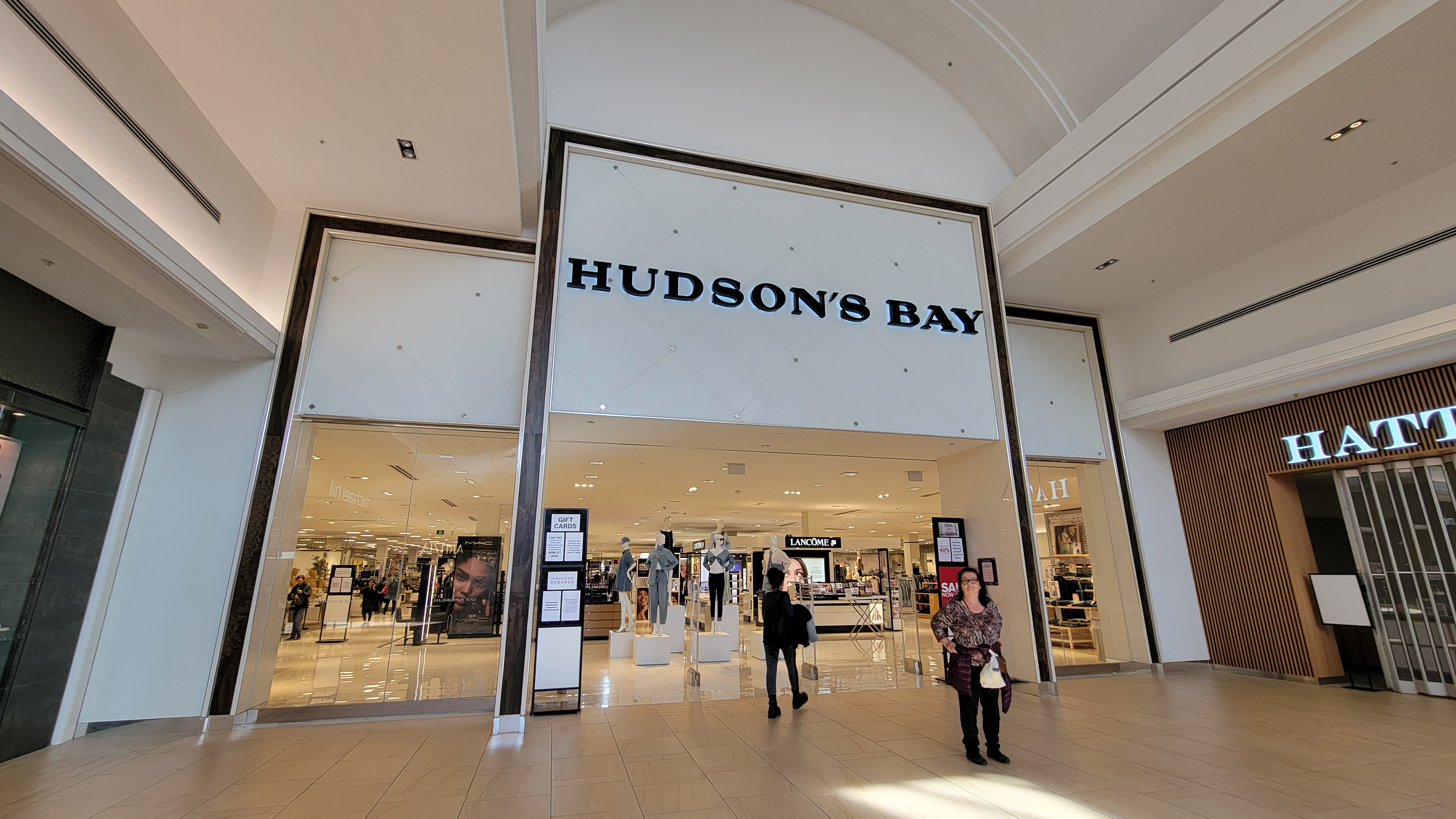
Hudson's Bay, formerly located centrally in Hillcrest Mall, was one of the mall's anchor stores

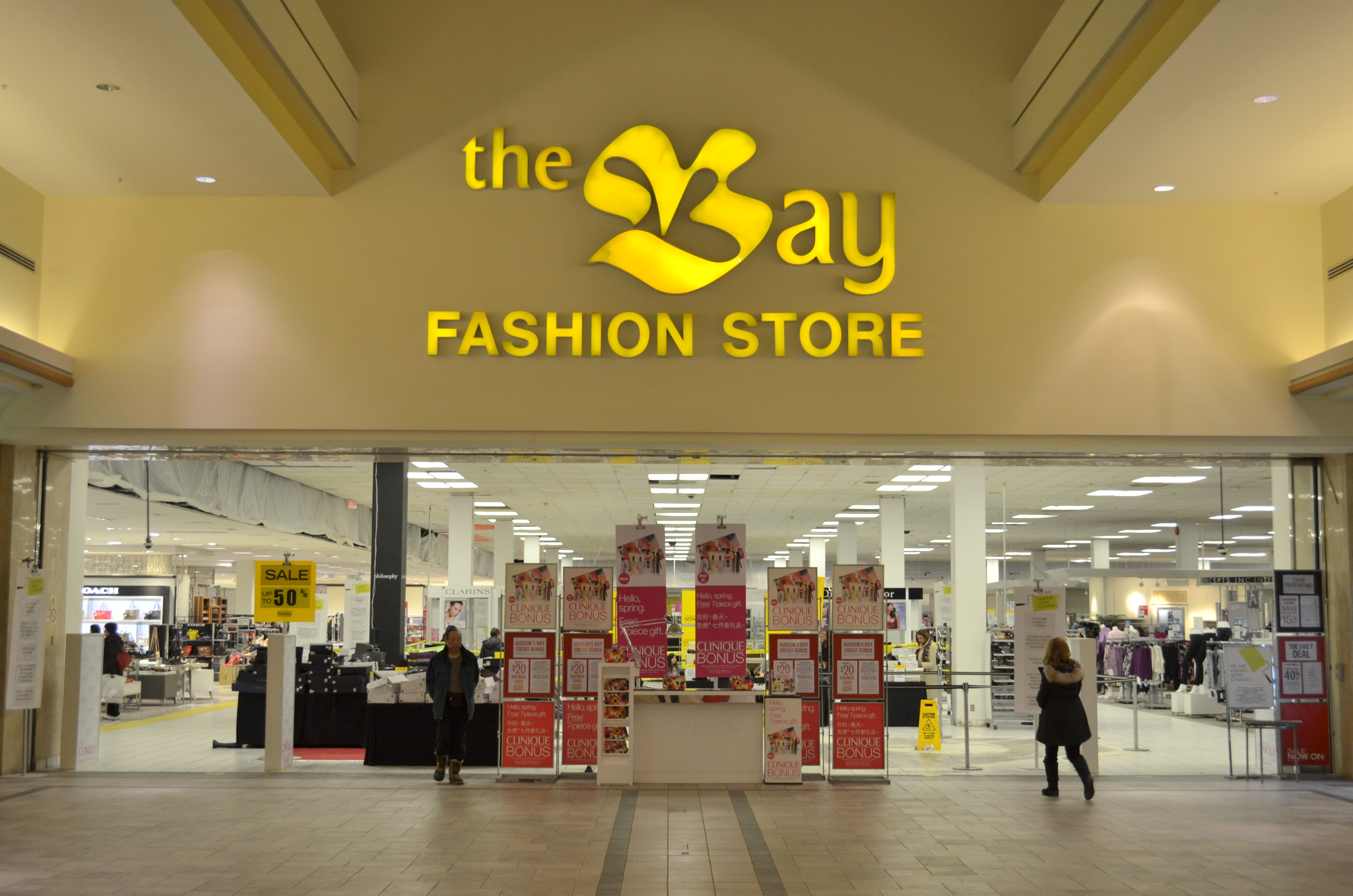
Hudson's Bay in 2015

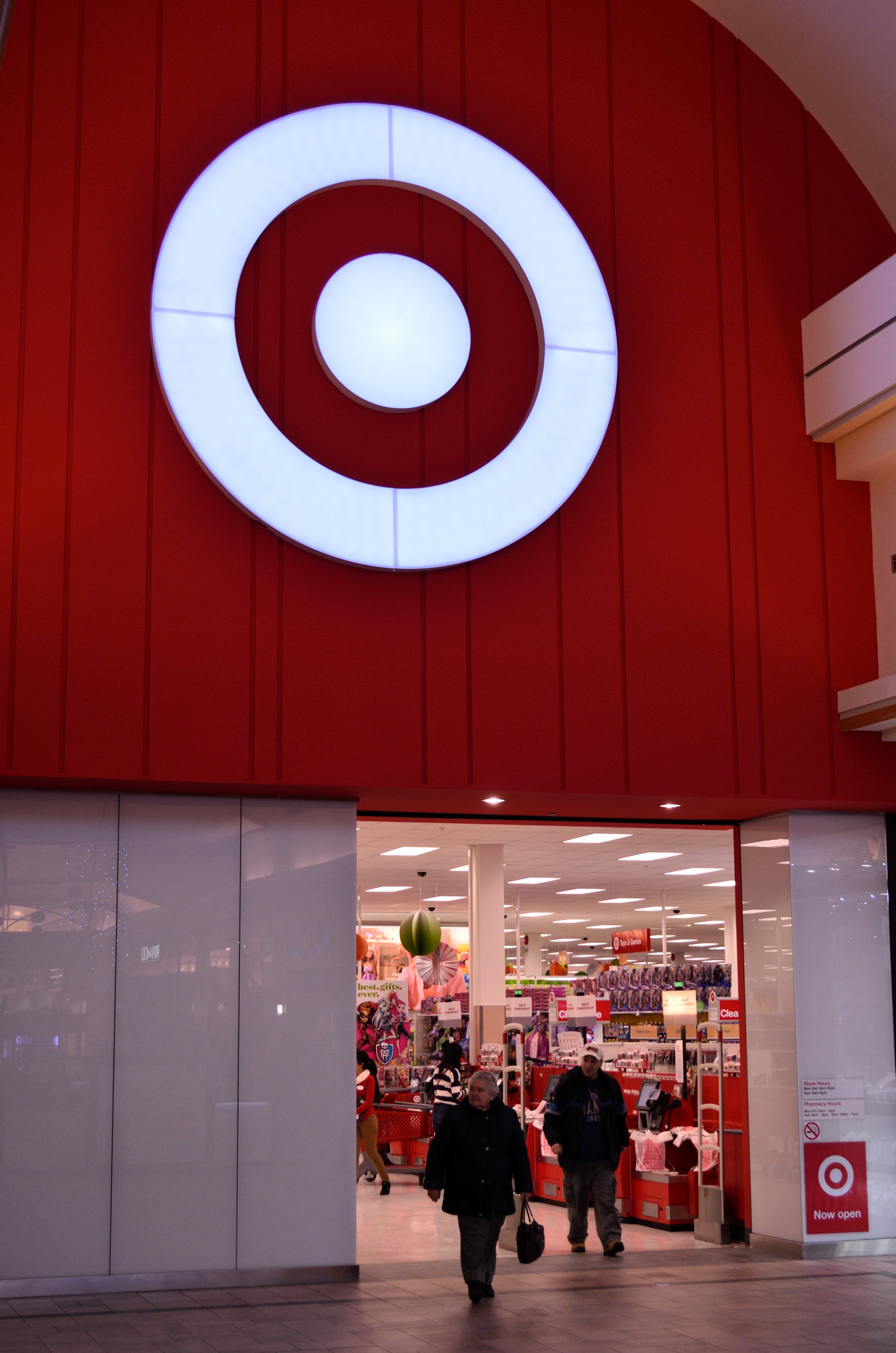
Target at Hillcrest opened in 2013 and closed in 2015.

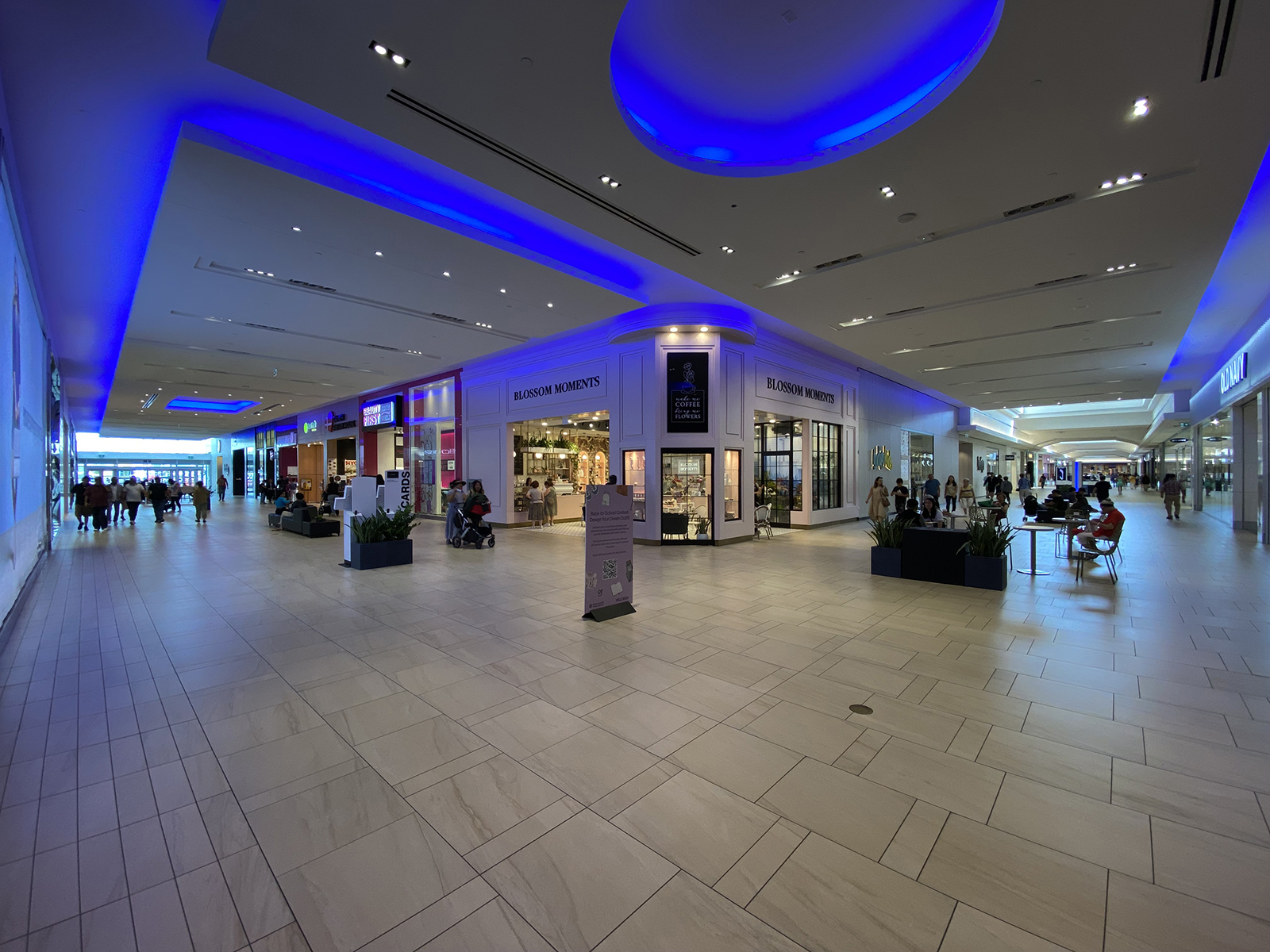
Former Target divided into several shops after 2015

In 2011, HBC sold the leases of most of its Zellers stores to Target Corporation; the mall's Zellers closed in early 2013 with Target Canada taking over the anchor space and reopening in its place on November 13, 2013. In January 2015, Target announced the liquidation of all its Canadian stores and closed in mid 2015. The lease was acquired by landlord Oxford Properties. The space was redeveloped and jointly leased to discount retailers Marshalls and HomeSense, which opened in September 2018.

In 2013, an application was made to Richmond Hill Town Council to exempt the mall from the Retail Business Holidays Act so that it may open on six public holidays: New Year's Day, Family Day, Good Friday, Victoria Day, Canada Day, Labour Day, and Thanksgiving. The holiday exemption application was accepted, and the mall now only closes on Easter Sunday and Christmas.

On September 12, 2015, Hudson's Bay expanded anchor store was officially reopened. The $125 million project expanded the store by 7,500 m^{2} (81,000 sq ft) of retail space to 11,000 m^{2} (120,000 sq ft) total, into which was its "Men's Store and Home" merging with the "Fashion Store" back to one location. The vacated anchor space was reconstructed for other tenants, which by the end of 2016 included Sporting Life, H&M, Aritzia, and Pandora.

On October 24, 2017, Hillcrest announced that they would put Marshalls, HomeSense, Indigo, and Old Navy stores in the former Target space in November 2018 along with a major interior renovation. The mall's interior got a refresh with new floors, lighting, washrooms, ceilings, upgraded food court, and new entrances 1 & 6 which was completed by October 2018.

In March 2025, Hudson's Bay Company announced that it would shutter most Hudson's Bay department stores it operated, with the exception of the store at Hillcrest Mall and five others, and began a liquidation sale. In April, the company announced that it could not find a buyer for the six stores excluded from the liquidation, and that they too would be closed. They were shuttered in June 2025.

Several large retailers used to be located at Hillcrest Mall:

- Simpson's - Replaced with The Bay in 1991.
- Kmart - Replaced with Zellers in 1998.
- Sears - Closed in 1986 (moved to The Promenade) and replaced with Zellers.
- Zellers - Opened in 1988 in former Sears location; moved in 1998 to former Kmart location; liquidated and closed in Spring 2013. Replaced by Target.
- Target - Opened in 2013, liquidated and closed in mid-2015. Replaced by north expansion.
- Hudson's Bay - opened in 1991 as The Bay, shuttered in June 2025 after a liquidation sale

The York Regional Police Community Resource Centre was located in the mall, and has now relocated to the southwest corner of Elgin Mills Road West and Yonge Street.

== Transportation access ==
The mall is accessible by York Region Transit (YRT), Viva and GO Transit.
