= Sporting Life (retailer) =

Canadian sporting retailer

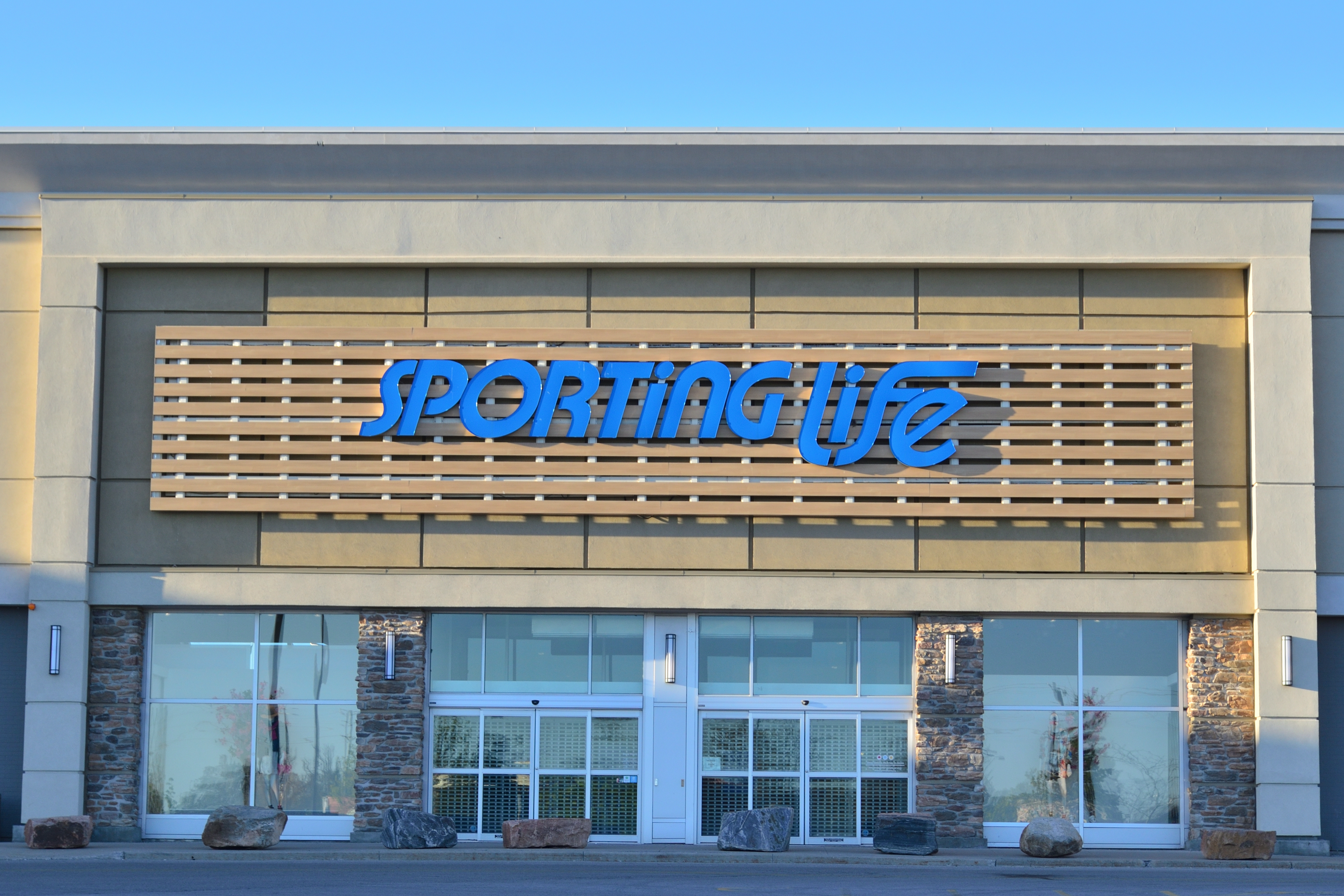
- Sporting Life at Markville Mall
- Industry: Retail
- Founded: 1979; 47 years ago
- Founders: David Russell, Patti Russell, Brian McGrath
- Headquarters: Toronto, Ontario, Canada
- Website: sportinglife.ca

Sporting Life is a sporting retailer shop based in Toronto, Ontario, Canada. Sporting Life sells sporting goods specially made for runners, cyclers, skiers, snowboarders, and hikers.

== History ==
Sporting Life was founded in 1979 as a privately owned company by David and Patti Russell (husband and wife), and Brian McGrath. The three co-founders are enthusiast skiers at a private club and are actively involved in picking merchandise, with Mr. Russell into sports equipment, Ms. Russell to fashion; and Mr. McGrath focused on footwear. As of 2011, there were 270 full-time staff and 600 employees. Fairfax Financial Holdings Limited bought a 75% share in the company in late 2011, with the founders retaining the remaining balance of shares.

Sporting Life originally had four locations until their 2014 expansion. Their flagship store is located at 2665 Yonge Street, just south of Lawrence Avenue, and it contains 36,000 square feet over two stories, having been recently expanded in 2011. Their 2454 Yonge Street location, that was closed in 2019, used to sell mainly bikes and snowboards, with a limited selection of apparel. They also have a 42,000-square-foot anchor space at Sherway Gardens, which relocated to a new wing in 2015 as part of the mall's expansion and renovation, while the original location was replaced by Nordstrom in 2017. There is also a 10,000-square-foot location in Collingwood, situated near Blue Mountain, which was initially their only store outside Toronto.

In 2008, Sporting Life launched its e-commerce website.

=== Expansion ===
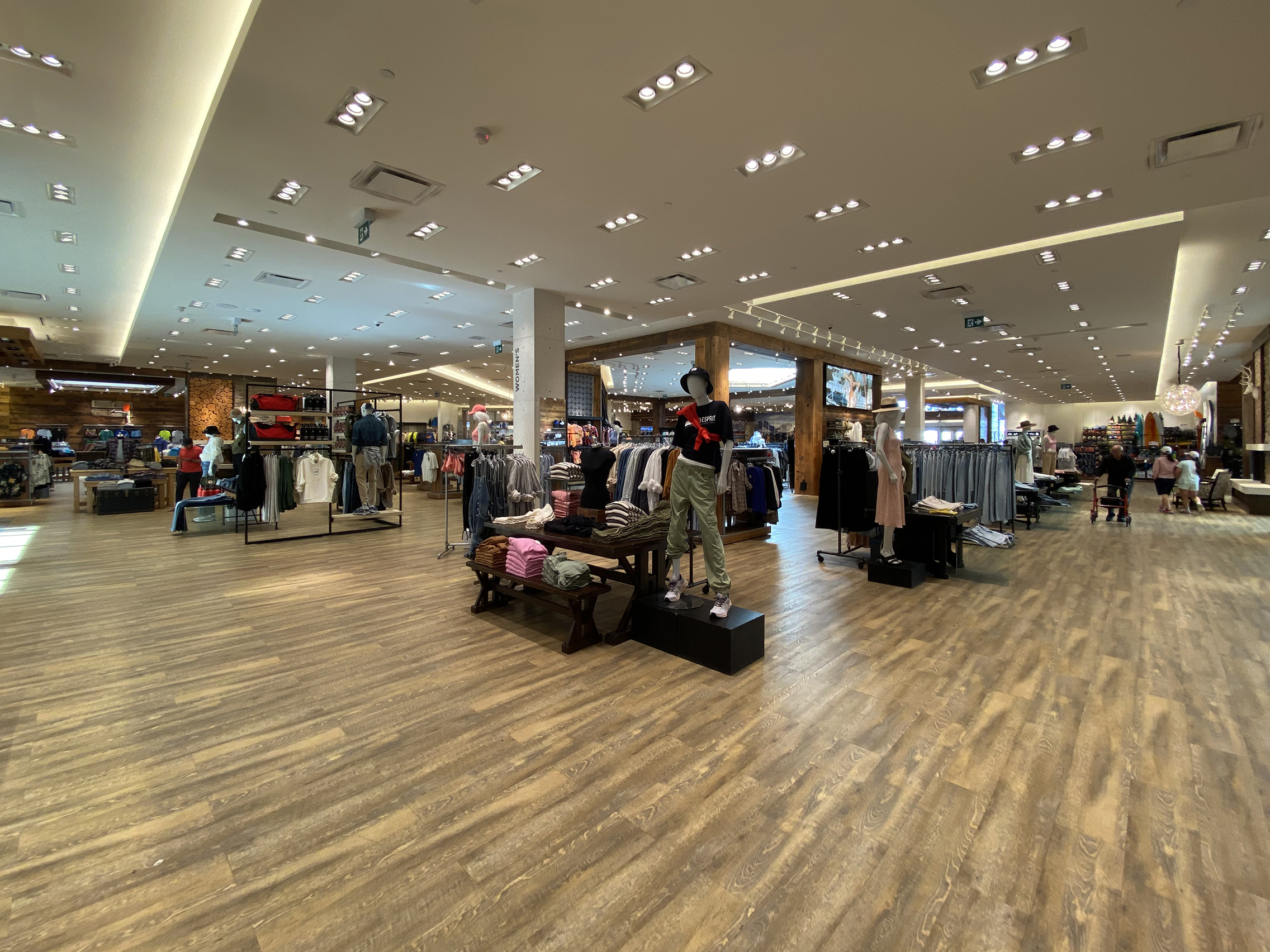
Sporting Life in Hillcrest Mall, Richmond Hill, ON

The co-founders of Sporting Life sold a 75% stake to Fairfax Financial in late 2011 in order to fund the retailer's expansion. The plan was to open two stores a year, with suggested locations in Vancouver, Edmonton, Calgary, and Montreal, each store being in the 30,000-50,000 square foot range.

Sporting Life's fifth and sixth locations opened in 2014, the first time in 14 years that they had opened a new store. Sporting Life had bought Ottawa-based Tommy & Lefebvre on June 25, 2013, and moved their staff from the Bank Street location to their new store at a reconstructed Lansdowne Park in October 2014. Another Sporting Life opened at the newly renovated Markville in September 2014, replacing a Sport Chek.

Sporting Life opened their seventh store at Hillcrest Mall in spring 2016, on the site of the former The Bay "Men's Store and Home" store; after The Bay had consolidated its two separate mall locations into a newly expanded central space. Two more stores opened in 2017; one at Yorkdale Shopping Centre in part of the space previously occupied by Sears Canada, and another at Calgary's CF Market Mall.

In October 2018, Sporting Life opened their first store outside Ontario and Alberta at Quartier Dix30, in Brossard, Quebec. The Brossard store permanently closed on January 2026.

In November 2019, Sporting Life expanded into British Columbia and opened first store in Greater Vancouver at Brentwood Mall.

In late 2022, Sporting Life opened 3 new stores located at Carrefour Laval Shopping Centre in Laval, Quebec, Mapleview Mall in Burlington, Ontario, and Southgate Mall in Edmonton, Alberta. This will bring their store total to 13 stores plus e-commerce. At maturity, Sporting Life will grow to 18 stores by 2027.

== Clientele ==
Sporting Life stocks outerwear, athleticwear, footwear, bikes, skis, snowboards and lifestyle apparel. It carries luxury labels such as Moncler, Moncler Grenoble, and Bogner.

Sporting Life was one of the first North American retailers of Canada Goose. Sporting Life's stock includes moderately prices brands like Nike and Adidas as well as catering to an upmarket and enthusiast clientele. This is a differentiator from another Canadian sporting goods retailer, Sport Chek, which caters to a more casual audience as well being common in Canadian shopping plazas and malls. Sporting Life's annual sales are reported to be under $200 million but this is unconfirmed as the company is privately held and does not make its financial statements public. Co-founder David Russell suggested that Sport Chek and Sporting Life were not direct competitors, saying “Typically, our price points take over where theirs end”.

Due to its few locations and product selection, Sporting Life has been described by the Toronto Star as a "destination shop". It is popular during Boxing Day and Black Friday, with lineups of customers waiting to enter. Sporting Life is also known for sponsoring the Sporting Life 10K run, which starts at its flagship store and takes the route of Yonge Street; the 2013 edition sold out with 27,000 participants raising $2.2 million.

== Sporting Life 10K ==
Sporting Life 10K
- Motto: Supporting Campfire Circle
- Purpose: To provide funding for Campfire Circle
- Frequency: Every year
- Inaugurated: 2003
- Headquarters: Toronto, Ontario
- Website: www.sportinglife10k.ca

The Sporting Life 10K is an annual 10K running/walking event on Yonge Street in Toronto, that has taken place every May since 2003. Money raised from the Sporting Life 10K goes towards funding Campfire Circle (formerly Camp Ooch & Camp Trillium)– a volunteer-run summer camp to provide enriching experiences to victims of childhood cancer.

27,000 people participated in 2013.
