= The Future Rocks =

E-commerce company

- Company type: Private
- Industry: E-commerce
- Founded: November 2019
- Founder: Anthony Tsang and Ray Cheng
- Headquarters: Hong Kong
- Products: Jewelry
- Website: https://thefuturerocks.com/

The Future Rocks is a global e-commerce company that operates an online marketplace for jewelry made from lab-grown diamonds, lab-grown gemstones, and recycled metals. Its headquarters is located in Hong Kong.

== History ==
The Future Rocks was founded by Anthony Tsang and Ray Cheng in November 2019. The marketplace was launched in April 2021 with six designers.

Its designers use materials such as recycled metals, lab-grown diamonds, and gemstones.

The company opened its first physical retail space with a pop-up shop at Tokyo's luxury department store, Isetan Shinjuku, in January 2023.

In 2024, The Future Rocks opened a new pop-up store at K11 Musea in Hong Kong.

As of November 2022, the company hosts 21 designers on its marketplace from nine countries, including the United States, France, Germany, Japan, China, Belgium and Switzerland. Notable designers selling on the marketplace are Swiss LOEV, Spanish RÊVER, German Maren Jewellery, and French Loyal.e Paris.

In November 2023, The Future Rocks launched The Ring collection. This design is crafted entirely from a single piece of lab-grown white sapphire band adorned with a 2ct lab-grown diamond center stone.

In December 2023, The Future Rocks collaborated with USA-based lab-grown diamond brand Lightbox Jewelry on an exclusive Lightbox Joy Collection, aiming at bringing a sense of daily delight to wearers through a selection of playful lab-grown jewelry.

In Spring 2024, The Future Rocks launched The Ring II with British model and actress Awoa Aboah.
