= Peter Simons (businessman) =

Canadian businessman

- Born: May 29, 1965 (age 61)
- Education: alumnus of Carleton University and Richard Ivey School of Business.
- Occupation: Businessman
- Employer: La Maison Simons

Peter D. Simons, CM CQ (born 29 May 1964) is a Canadian businessman. He was the president and CEO of La Maison Simons until 2022, when Bernard Leblanc took over those positions.

== Early life and education ==
The third of four children, Simons was born in Quebec City to Gordon Donald Simons and Barbara Lynne Schneider.

Simons studied pure science at Carleton University, and then economics at the Richard Ivey School of Business at the University of Western Ontario, where he received an Honours Business Administration undergraduate degree.

== Career ==
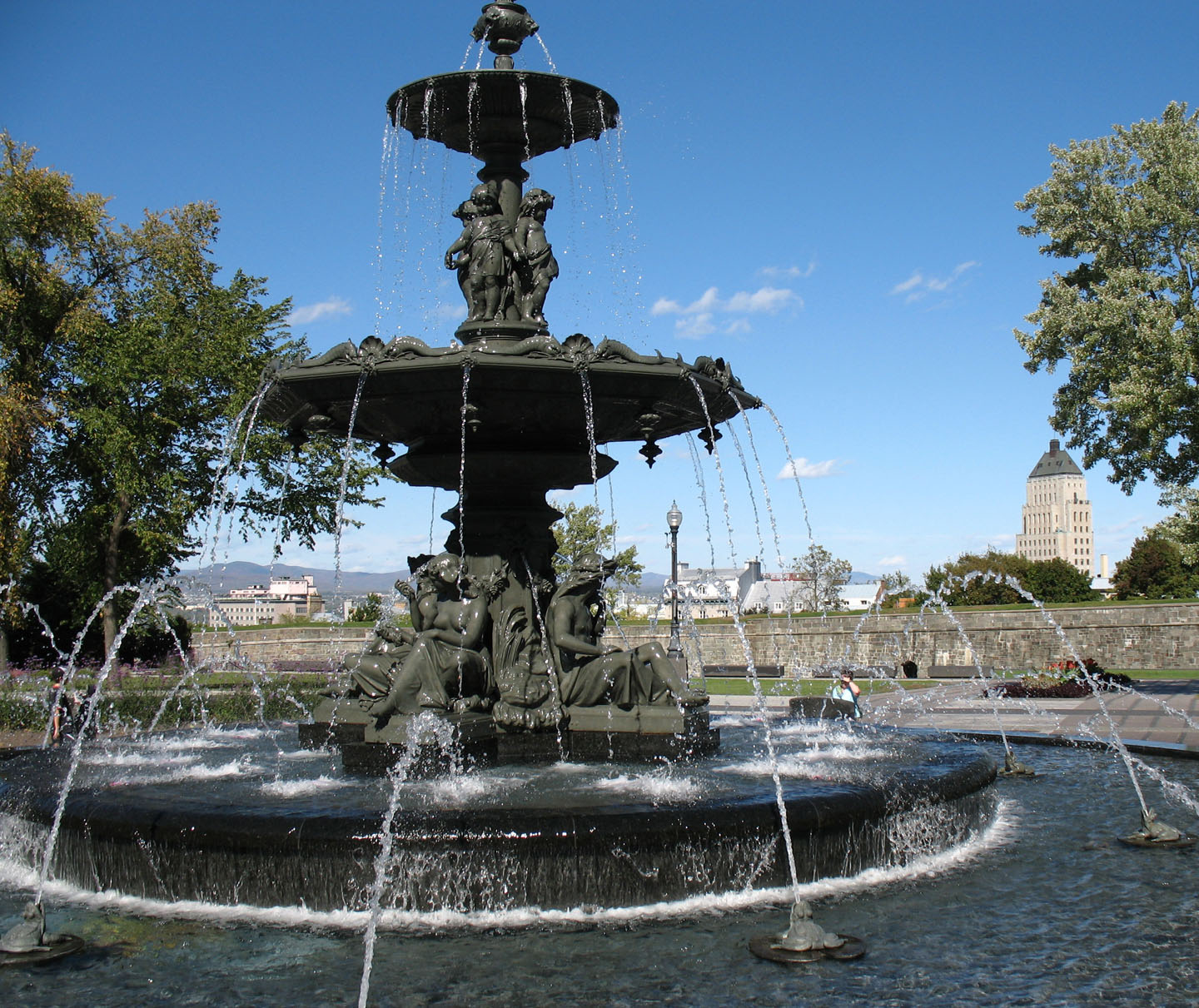
The Fontaine de Tourny in Quebec City.

Simons began working at La Maison Simons in 1986. He and his brother Richard took over the business in 1996, becoming the fifth generation of the Simons family to run the store. Under Peter and Richard Simons, La Maison Simons expanded outside of Quebec City for the first time, opening stores in Sherbrooke and Montreal in 1999, Saint-Bruno-de-Montarville in 2001, Laval in 2002 and Anjou, Quebec in August 2013. Simons opened the 9th store in Gatineau in 2015. At the time, annual sales were reported as higher than $C 300 million.

Upon a visit to Paris, Simons discovered one of the seven existing Fontaine de Tourny pieces in an antique shop. The fountain was once located in the Allées de Tourny in Bordeaux. Simons had the fountain restored on Île d’Orléans. He donated it to Quebec City as a gift for its 400th anniversary, and had it installed in front of the National Assembly of Quebec in July 2007.

== Honours ==
Simons was recognized as a Knight of the National Order of Quebec in 2008. Simons received the King Charles III Coronation Medal on 20 June 2025. Simons received an honorary doctorate in administrative sciences from Université Laval.

== See also ==
- History of Quebec City
- John Hamilton Simons
