= Trampoline (disambiguation) =

A trampoline is a gymnastics and recreation device.

Trampoline may also refer to:

== Music ==
=== Bands ===
- Trampolene (band), a British rock band

=== Albums ===
- Trampoline (Steel Train album) (2007)
- Trampoline (The Confusions album) (2002)
- Trampoline (The Mavericks album) (1998), by alternative country group The Mavericks
- Trampoline (Joe Henry album) (1996)

=== Songs ===
- "Trampoline" (Shaed song)
- "Trampoline" (Kero Kero Bonito song)
- "Trampoline" (Tinie Tempah song)
- "Trampoline" (Lazlo Bane song)
- "Trampolene", a song by Julian Cope from his album Saint Julian (1986)
- "Trampoline", by Hopsin from the album Raw (2010)
- "Trampoline", by Never Shout Never from his album Harmony (2010)
- "Trampoline", by the Spencer Davis Group from their album The Best of the Spencer Davis Group featuring Steve Winwood (1967)

== Other uses ==
- Trampoline (advertising agency)
- Trampoline (computing)
- Trampoline (horse) (1825–?), thoroughbred racehorse
- Trampoline (multihulls), a part of multihull sailboats
- Trampoline (Bluey), an episode of the Australian animated television series Bluey
- "Trampoline", an episode of The Good Doctor

== See also ==
- Trampolining
