= La Maison Simons =

Canadian department store chain

La Maison Simons Inc.

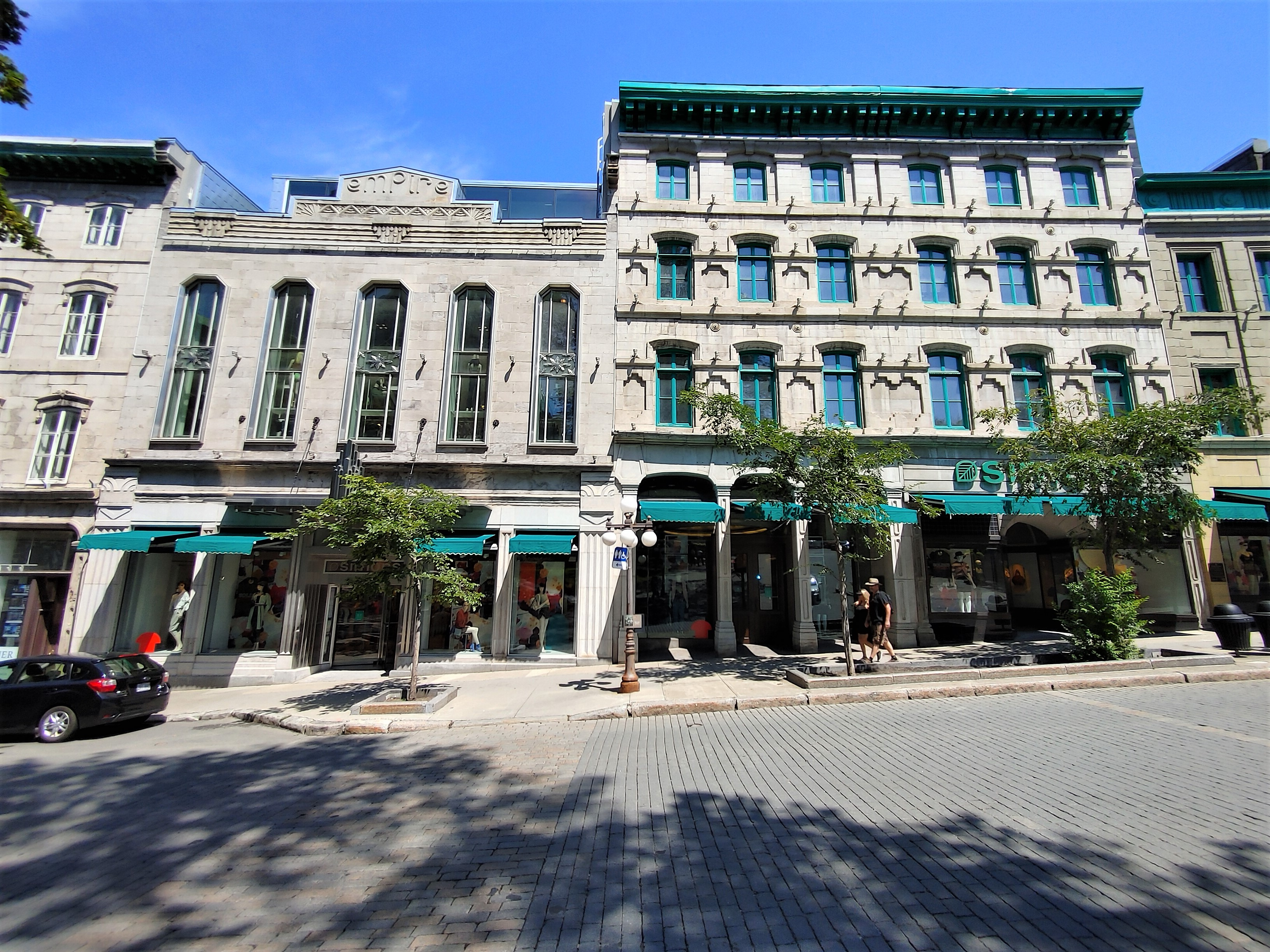
- Flagship store and headquarters on Côte de la Fabrique in Old Quebec (2021)
- Type: Private
- Industry: Retail
- Genre: Department stores
- Founded: 1840; 186 years ago in Quebec City, Lower Canada
- Founder: John Hamilton Simons
- Headquarters: 20, côte de la Fabrique; Quebec City, Quebec; G1R 3V9
- Number of locations: 19 (2026)
- Area served: Canada
- Key people: Bernard Leblanc (president & CEO); Peter Simons (chief merchant)
- Products: Clothing; accessories; footwear; fragrances; jewellery; beauty products
- Number of employees: 2,500 (2017)
- Website: simons.ca

La Maison Simons (colloquially Simons) is a Canadian department store chain founded in 1840 by John Hamilton Simons. The business was first established as a dry goods store and remains privately owned by the Simons family.

While historic Canadian department stores such as Eaton's, Sears, and Hudson's Bay have closed, both La Maison Simons and Holt Renfrew (both of which were founded in the 1800s in Quebec City) continue to operate and expand; they are among the last large-format department-style clothing retailers in the country.

== History ==
=== Founding to 1950s ===
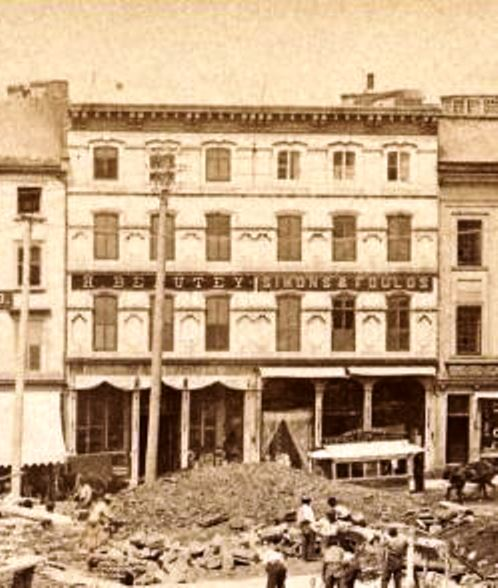
Simons & Foulds store in 1895 on côte de la Fabrique, Quebec City.

Peter Simons, born in Scotland in 1785, arrived in Lower Canada in 1812 and settled on a small farm in Beauport, near Quebec City. He raised a family of five, including a son – John Simons – who opened a small dry goods shop in Quebec City in 1840 at the age of 17. John Simons is reported to have made more than 70 crossings of the Atlantic Ocean to source English and Scottish goods for the store. The business operated under successive partnership names, including Simons & Foulds and later Simons & Minguy, before the Simons family became its sole owner in 1934, when it began shifting from dry goods toward ready-to-wear clothing.

In 1870, John Simons moved his shop to 20 Côte de la Fabrique, where it remains today. Business increased following the move, and in 1952, the post-World War II boom brought new market opportunities. This is when Gordon Donald Simons entered the company and led the business into a new era, transforming it into a department store. The company introduced youth-oriented, fashion-focused brands such as Twik, named after the model and cultural icon Twiggy, reflecting fashion trends of the period.

=== 1960s–2008: Growth ===
In 1961, La Maison Simons entered a growth phase with a new store at Place Sainte-Foy in Quebec City, its first location beyond the original flagship, where home decor was introduced as well as new brands for men and women. In 1981, a new store opened in Galeries de la Capitale, also in Quebec City. La Maison Simons opened new Quebec locations in Sherbrooke and Montreal in 1999. Two years later, in 2001, a store was opened at Promenades Saint-Bruno. The final new location in the burst of expansion was in 2002, when La Maison Simons opened a new store in Laval, Quebec.

Celebrating the 400th anniversary of Quebec City in 2008, La Maison Simons gifted a restored fountain, the Fontaine de Tourny, imported from France. The fountain was originally positioned in Bordeaux's Allées de Tourny, named after Aubert Tourny, a French intendant remembered for his contribution to the beautification of Bordeaux, Quebec City's sister city. It was built in the mid-19th century and won a gold medal at the Paris World Exposition of 1855. The Fontaine de Tourny was installed in front of the National Assembly of Quebec in April 2007.

In August 2008, the retailer chose to withdraw its fall catalogue after complaints its models were too thin.

=== 2012–present: Expansion outside of Quebec ===
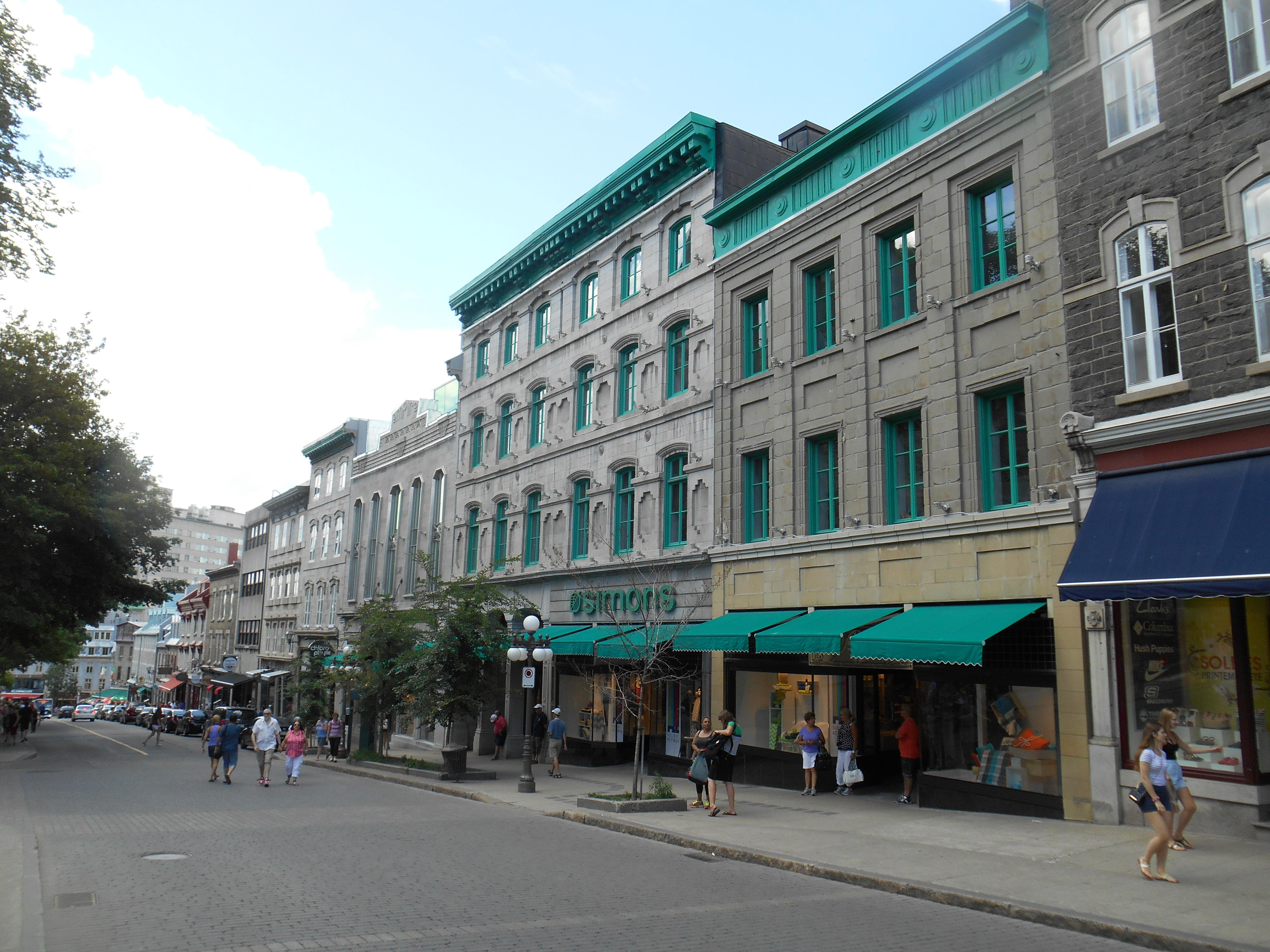
Simons store in 2014 on côte de la Fabrique, Quebec City.

In 2012, Simons expanded to its seventh and largest location at West Edmonton Mall, its first outside of Quebec. It spent nearly $50 million on the store alone. The success of the location led other shopping malls to seek out La Maison Simons as an anchor tenant. On March 27, 2013, Simons announced it would open a new location in Ottawa, Ontario's Rideau Centre in 2015 (although the store did not actually open until August 2016). This was followed by an announcement on December 6, 2013, stating that a flagship store was to open at Square One Shopping Centre in Mississauga, in spring 2016. The new store, which opened in March 2016, occupies a large portion of the former Sears Canada store.

Simons designs each store individually, incorporating art installations and distinctive architectural elements. In a 2015 interview with Canadian Business, then-CEO Peter Simons said, "We're trying to hold on to this belief in creativity and architecture and art. We're working with Doug Coupland, for instance, on an art piece in Vancouver, and we try to do that with all the stores we build."

A new store in Gatineau, Quebec, opened on August 13, 2015, investing $21 million in the location. Furthermore, in 2015, a location opened at Park Royal Shopping Centre in West Vancouver, British Columbia. A store in Calgary, Alberta, opened on March 16, 2017, in the Lancaster Building as part of The Core shopping mall. In August 2017, La Maison Simons opened a new store in Edmonton, Alberta, at Londonderry Mall. In May 2018, La Maison Simons received outside investment for the first time in its history as part of efforts to open a new distribution centre in Quebec City.

In February 2020, Canada Goose ended its wholesale agreement with La Maison Simons, which accounted for millions in sales for the company. At the same time and through the COVID-19 pandemic in Canada, Simons was having troubles with credit insurance on deliveries and all stock from designers, such as Balmain, had been moved to Simons' website. In August 2020, La Maison Simons claims to have regained profitability and sent letters to vendors in July assuring payment in full and fall deliveries will be delayed to preserve cash.

In March 2022, Bernard Leblanc succeeded Peter Simons as chief executive officer, becoming the first person outside the Simons family to lead the company.

Simons store at the Toronto Eaton Centre seen along Yonge Street

In March 2024, Simons opened its first store in Atlantic Canada, at the Halifax Shopping Centre in Nova Scotia. On August 14, 2025, La Maison Simons opened its first Toronto store at Yorkdale Shopping Centre, occupying a 118,000-square-foot, two-storey space formerly held by Nordstrom. A second Toronto store, at the Eaton Centre, opened on September 18, 2025; the two locations together represented a $75 million investment. Simons projected that the expansion would increase annual sales by 15 percent to $650 million, and said recent U.S. tariffs had encouraged more Canadian consumers to buy its house brands, which account for about 70 percent of its merchandise.

In April 2026, Simons announced it would open a location at the Pacific Centre in Vancouver, in a space previously occupied by Nordstrom, expected to open in 2027.

== Locations ==
The chain operates 19 stores across Canada. It also has buying offices in London, Paris, Florence and Hong Kong.

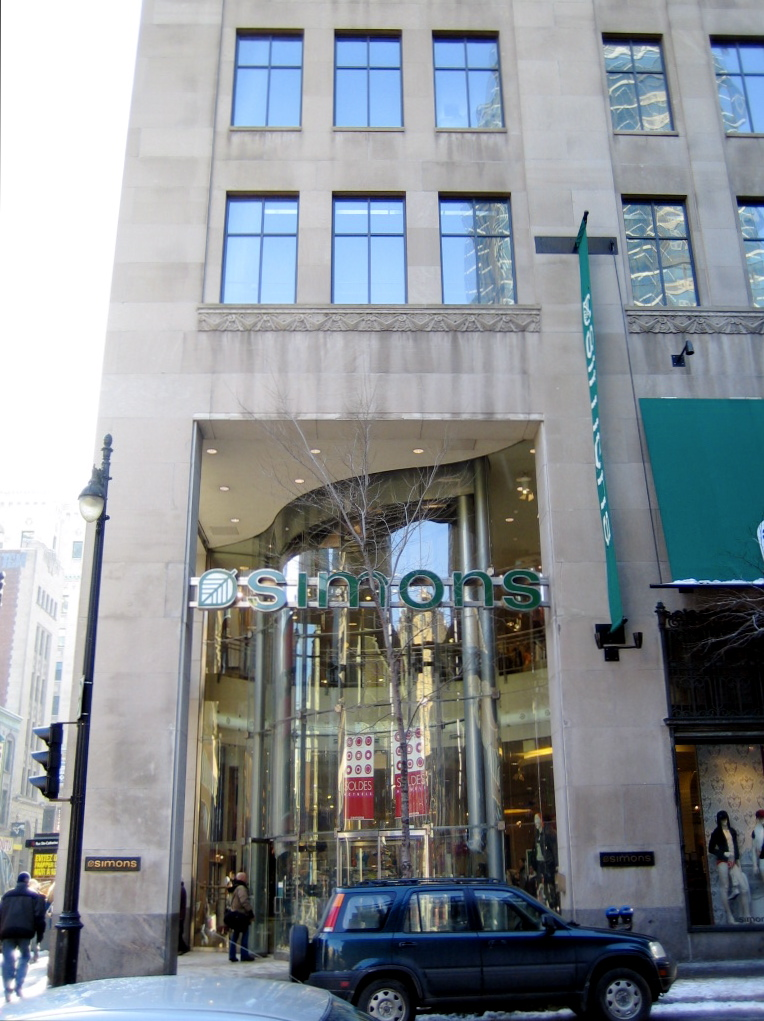
Downtown Montreal store on Saint Catherine Street

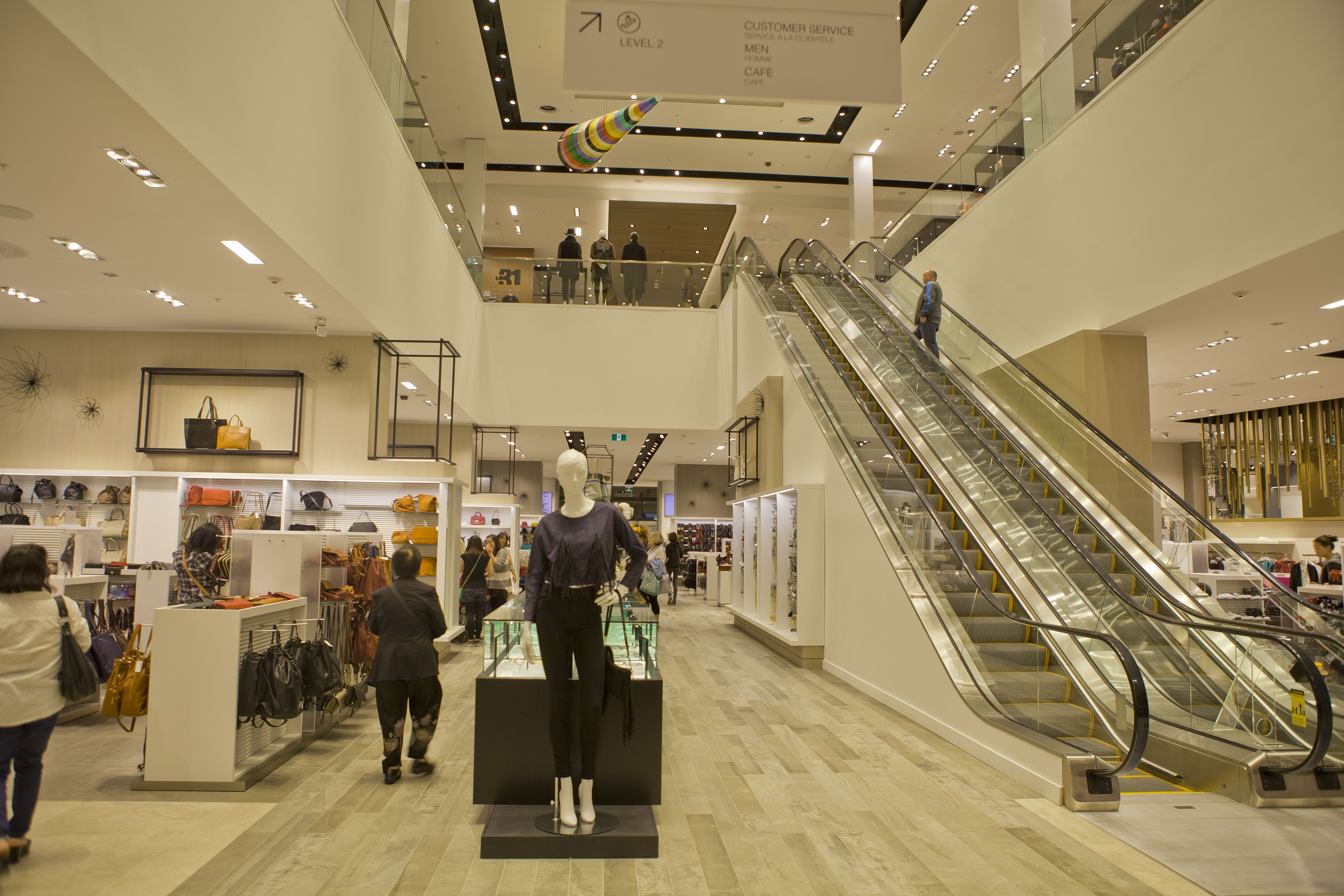
Park Royal store in West Vancouver

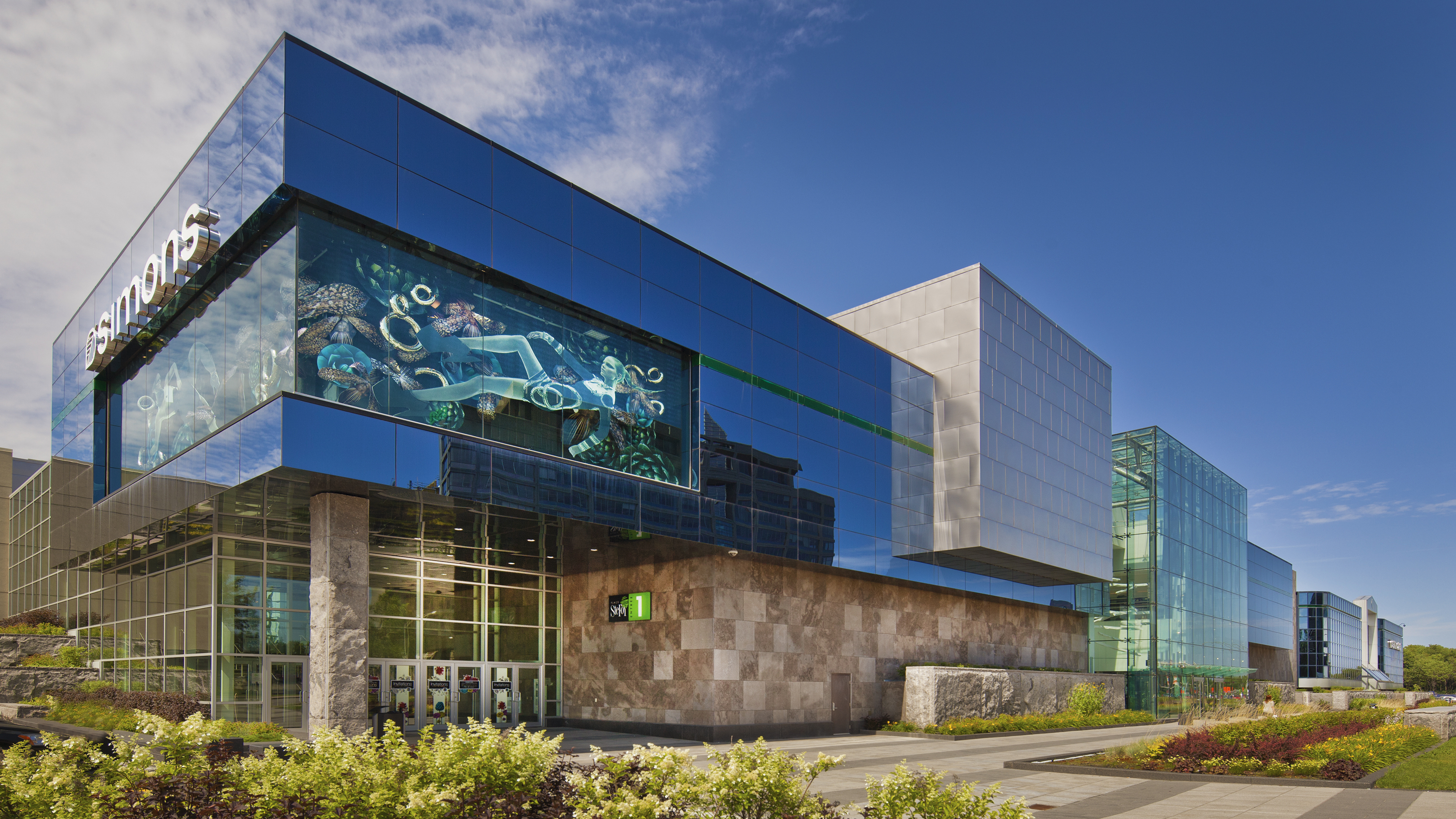
Place Sainte-Foy store in Quebec City

=== Alberta ===
- The Core Shopping Centre, Downtown Calgary, Calgary
- Londonderry Mall, Edmonton
- West Edmonton Mall, Edmonton

=== Quebec ===
- Les Promenades Gatineau, Gatineau
- CF Carrefour Laval, Laval
- Carrefour Industrielle Alliance, Downtown Montreal, Montreal
- Galeries d'Anjou, Montreal
- Fairview Pointe-Claire, Pointe-Claire
- Galeries de la Capitale, Quebec City
- Côte de la Fabrique, Old Quebec, Quebec City
- Place Sainte-Foy, Quebec City
- Promenades Saint-Bruno, Saint-Bruno-de-Montarville
- Carrefour de l'Estrie, Sherbrooke

=== Ontario ===
- Square One Shopping Centre, Mississauga City Centre, Mississauga
- CF Rideau Centre, Downtown Ottawa, Ottawa
- Yorkdale Shopping Centre, North York, Toronto
- CF Toronto Eaton Centre, Downtown Toronto, Toronto

=== British Columbia ===
- Park Royal Shopping Centre, West Vancouver
- Pacific Centre, Downtown Vancouver, Vancouver

=== Nova Scotia ===
- Halifax Shopping Centre, Halifax

== See also ==
- List of Canadian department stores
- History of Quebec City
- Holt Renfrew, another fashion store chain founded in Quebec City in the mid-19th century
- Les Ailes de la Mode, another department store chain founded in Quebec in the 1990s
- Scots-Quebecers
