= Halifax mass shooting plot =

2015 plan for a mass shooting in Canada

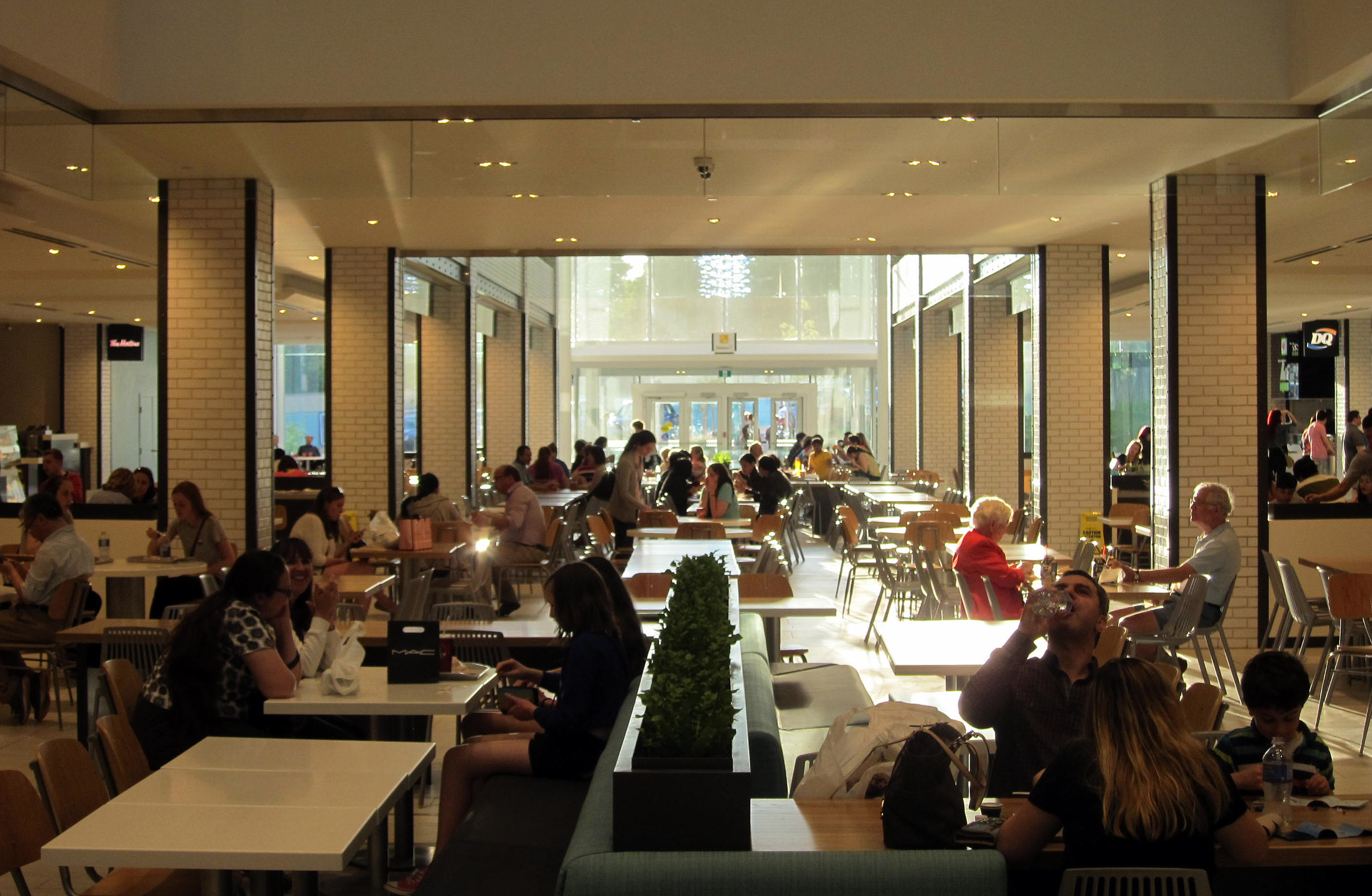
- The conspirators were planning to target the food court of the mall.
- Location: Halifax, Nova Scotia, Canada
- Date: Saturday, February 14, 2015; 11 years ago
- Target: Halifax Shopping Centre
- Attack type: Planned mass shooting
- Weapons: .308 Savage 99 Lever action rifle; Single-shot 16-gauge shotgun; Molotov cocktails
- Deaths: 1; James Gamble (suicide)
- Injuries: 0
- Perpetrators: Lindsay Souvannarath; Randall Shepherd; James Gamble
- Motive: White Supremacy; Columbine High School massacre copycat crime

The Halifax mass shooting plot took place between February 12 and February 14, 2015. Police were alerted to three people, identified as Lindsay Souvannarath, Randall Shepherd, and James Gamble, who were reportedly conspiring to commit a mass killing at the Halifax Shopping Centre. Souvannarath and Shepherd were arrested and convicted of conspiracy to commit murder, while Gamble was found dead of a self-inflicted gunshot wound soon after learning of the impending police investigation.

== Details ==
On February 12, 2015, the Royal Canadian Mounted Police (RCMP) in Halifax, Nova Scotia, Canada, received a tip through Crime Stoppers that three persons were planning to commit a mass killing at the Halifax Shopping Centre. Two of the suspects, Randall Steven Shepherd, 20, of Timberlea, and Lindsay Kanittha Souvannarath, 23, from Geneva, Illinois, had access to firearms and presented a threat.

In the early morning of February 13, police staked out Gamble's duplex house in Timberlea, a small suburb outside of Halifax. After both of Gamble's parents had left the house and been questioned by police, police entered the house and found the third plot suspect, 19-year-old James Lee Rushton Gamble, deceased from a self-inflicted gunshot wound. Also found in the house were three rifles. At the same time, the police arrested Souvannarath and Shepherd at Halifax Stanfield International Airport. Shepherd was meeting Souvannarath, Gamble's online girlfriend, as she arrived from the United States. A 17-year-old from Cole Harbour was arrested at 11 am, but was shortly thereafter released from custody due to determination that he had no idea of, nor involvement in the plot. The police learned that it was the trio's intention to go into a public venue and open fire, attempting to kill as many people as possible, before turning the guns on themselves on February 14 (Valentine's Day). The venue was later disclosed as the Halifax Shopping Centre on Mumford Road.

Shepherd and Souvannarath faced charges of conspiracy to commit murder, conspiracy to commit arson, conspiracy to use weapons for a dangerous purpose, and unlawfully conveying threats through social media.

== Suspects ==
Souvannarath, Shepherd, and Gamble first met on the website GameFAQs via its "Current Events" message board, but often collaborated on Tumblr, where they shared an obsession with death, true crime, and Nazi imagery. Gamble's blog included imagery of Nazis and the Columbine High School massacre, along with pictures of guns from World War II, and Shepherd's contained posts relating to death/black metal bands and gore, whereas on Souvannarath's blog, headlined with "School Shooter Chic; violence is the aesthetic," she made many allusions to events of mass murder and mayhem in the month of February and as early as several months beforehand, interspersed with anti-Semitic comments in juxtaposition with posts of photo sets of Japanese fashion on her pastel-pink background. Souvannarath also showed intense infatuation with Varg Vikernes, best known as the sole member of the black metal project Burzum, who is a white nationalist and previously served a 21-year prison sentence for murder and arson. On February 5, 2015, Gamble reblogged a photo Souvannarath posted on Tumblr saying "Valentine's Day, it's going down", hinting to the would-be shooting.

== Charges ==
As of February 19, 2015, Shepherd and Souvannarath faced charges of conspiracy to commit murder, conspiracy to commit arson, illegal possession of weapons for dangerous purposes against the public, and making threats over social media. They appeared in court on March 6, but did not seek bail. Preliminary court proceedings continued on April 10.

On November 22, 2016, Shepherd pled guilty at Nova Scotia Supreme Court on the charge of conspiracy to commit murder, and was sentenced to 10 years in prison, less 974 days for time served. Souvannarath was expected to go to trial in May 2017 on charges of conspiracy to commit murder and conspiracy to commit arson, but instead pleaded guilty in April. On April 20, 2018, she was sentenced to life in prison with no possibility of parole for ten years. Souvannarath appealed her sentence, arguing it was "flawed and manifestly harsh and excessive", however the appeal was denied on May 29, 2019.

== Imprisonment ==
=== Souvannarath ===
While serving a life sentence for her role in the Halifax mass shooting plot, in 2019 Souvannarath gave her first ever interview since her arrest by appearing on The Night Time Podcast, a Halifax-based podcast focusing on Canadian crime, mysteries, and offbeat stories.

In the seven part podcast series, Souvannarath spoke candidly about her life, her neo-Nazi radicalization, her relationship with James Gamble, the planning of the shooting plot, and the events surrounding her arrest at the Halifax airport. In August 2025, Souvannarath was denied parole.

=== Shepherd ===
In the fall 2021, Randall Shepherd was released via parole and entered a halfway house. The parole lasted until the fall of 2024, during which he was not allowed to use the internet.
