= Londonderry Mall =

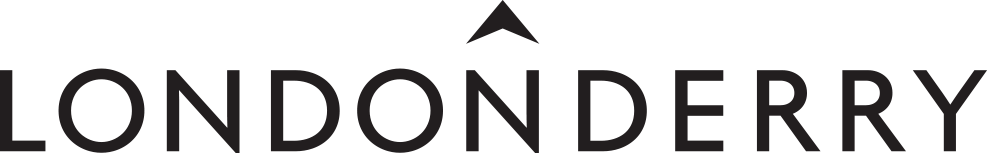
- Logo as of February 2017
- Location: Edmonton, Alberta, Canada
- Coordinates: 53°36′07″N 113°26′44″W
- Address: 6604 137 Avenue NW
- Opened: August 15, 1972
- Developer: Cushman & Wakefield
- Manager: Leyad
- Num. of stores: 150+
- Num. of anchor tenants: 5
- Floor area: 776,749 square feet (72,162.3 m^{2})
- Floors: 2
- Parking: 3,528 stalls
- Public transit: 54 107 113 114 128
- Website: www.londonderrymall.com

Londonderry Mall is a shopping centre located in north Edmonton, Alberta, Canada. It contains over 150 stores and services with nine major tenants. The mall opened in 1972 and has been expanded and renovated since.

Londonderry Mall has many notable stores, including a Shoppers Drug Mart, Winners, No Frills, Dollar Tree, Dollarama, Fabricland, Fit 4 Less, a Simons department store, H&M, a Zellers department store, Laser City, and an EPL library.

The mall recently went under a complete renovation which completed in August 2017.

== History ==
Londonderry Mall opened in 1972 with 85 stores and services. When it opened, it was the largest two-floor enclosed shopping centre in western Canada. Original tenants included The Bay, Eaton's, Woolco, and a movie theatre. Later, it would expand to include Safeway.

The mall underwent its first major expansion in late 1979, then again in the later 1980s. The mall added a wing to the west, and then to the south, which included Eaton's new location, and the Edmonton Public Library. The mall expanded to 150 stores and services.

A renovation was completed in 1990 which saw the opening of a new food court in the center of the mall. In 1994, Wal-Mart took over the Woolco location. In the late 1990s, Eatons closed. Save-On-Foods promptly moved into the former Eaton's space on the lower level and Winners on the upper level.

In 2003, the Wal-Mart relocated to a stand-alone building to the east in Clareview. Army & Navy took over the main floor and Sport Chek Supercentre took over the second floor.

In late 2013, the relocation and closing of many major tenants and small stores left the mall with many unoccupied spaces.

In late 2014, the mall announced a complete mall renovation and remerchandising project. Sport Chek Supercentre had relocated to Manning Town Centre in fall 2013 and Army & Navy had closed in 2016 to make way for a newly announced Simons store. Winners re-located to an unused space, which was previously used for Safeway and the movie theatre, which made way for the re-location of the food court to the former Winners space. Fabricland remained in the former Winners space while Dollarama relocated to the new food court from a neighboring space where Sport Chek was formerly located to make way for H&M.

Save-On-Foods closed in 2022, because the mall owners struggled to keep the store in business due to expensive rent. No Frills took the former location of Save-On-Foods in summer of 2023. Unlike Save-On, No Frills cannot be accessed from the mall.

On February 1, 2023, Hudson's Bay announced that they would close their location at the mall in August of that same year. It was later announced that the store would remain open, but in a smaller footprint as on outlet store on the main floor only. In June 2025, Hudson's Bay closed all of its stores, including the one at Londonderry. In August 2025, a revived Zellers was announced to open in the former main level of the Hudson's Bay space. It was delayed to October, where Zellers opened at Londonderry on the 30th of October. Laser City, a laser tag arena and arcade opened in the former upper floor of Hudson's Bay that was not taken over by Zellers in September 2026.

Previous logos of Londonderry Mall

2009

2011

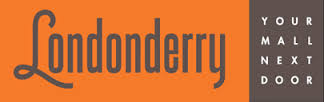
2013

== Renovation ==
In September 2014, Londonderry Mall publicly announced a renovation and remerchandising project. The renovation completely changed the face of the mall, including all new entrances, lighting, escalators, elevators, along with the relocation of many stores and the food court. The renovation was designed by MMC Architects and GH+A Design and was completed in August 2017.

Demolition and gutting of the interior of the mall was completed by mid-2015, which included the removal of all elevators, escalators, water fountains and plant-beds. The first phase of the renovation was complete in June 2016, which included the relocation of the food court and the renovation of the mall common areas. The second phase of the renovation was completed in August 2017, in which the new Simons store opened to the public, along with much smaller local Alberta based stores.

== Gallery ==
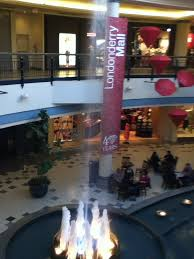
The Centre Fountain before renovations in September 2012.

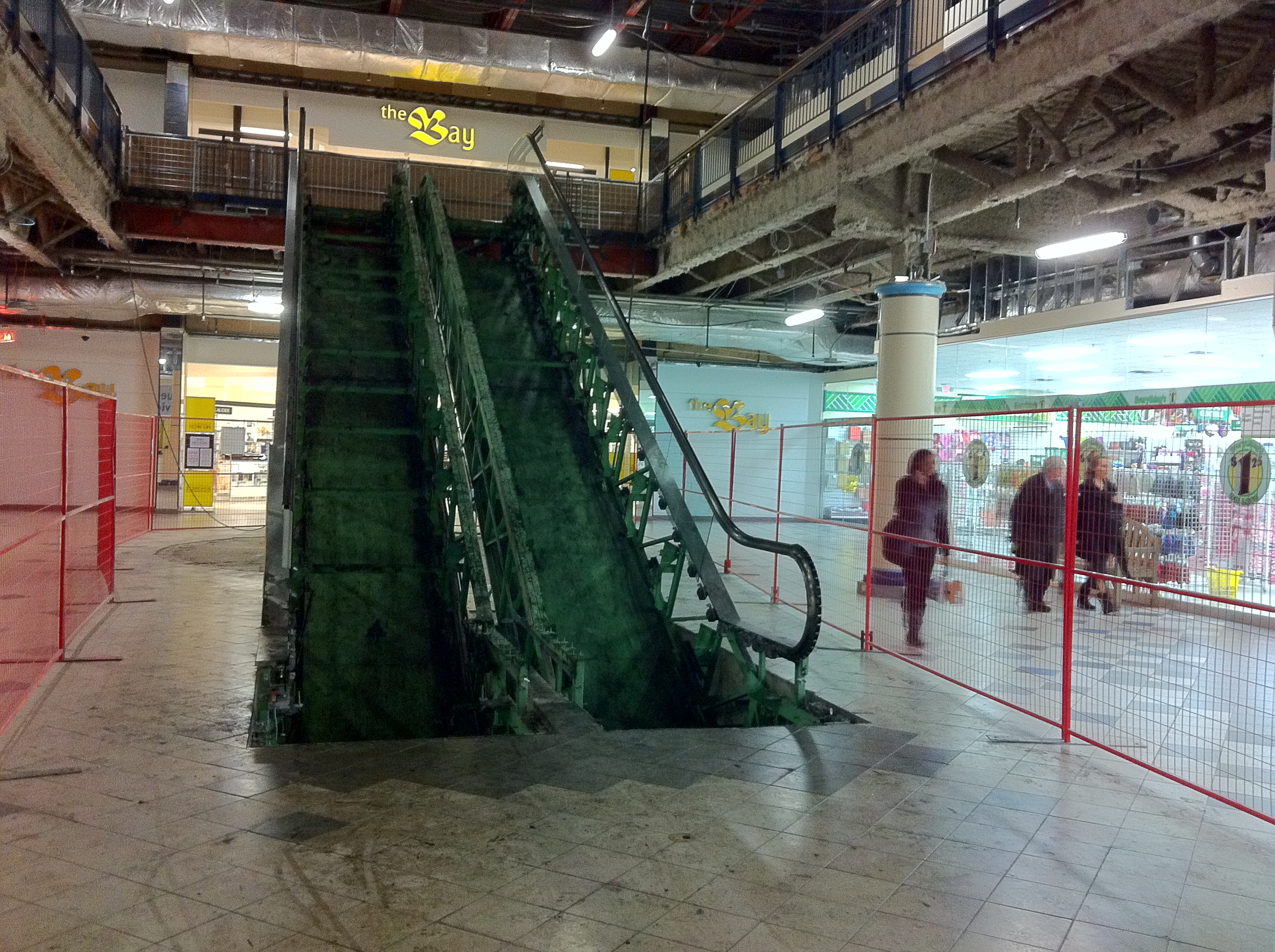
Londonderry Mall escalator being taken down in January 2015.

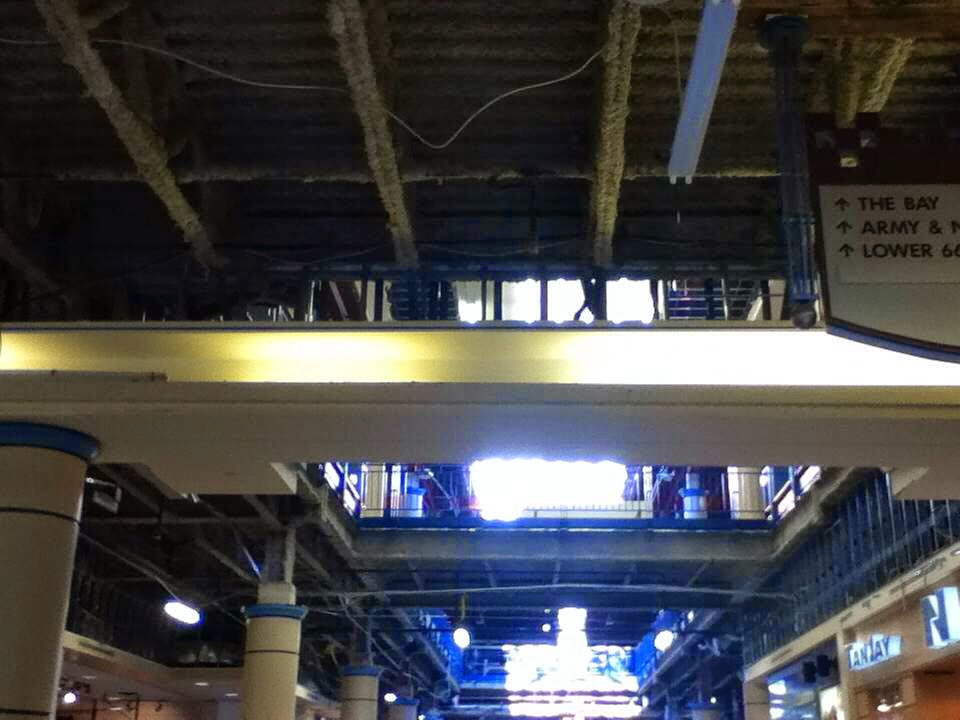
The mall in April 2014 as the renovation begins.

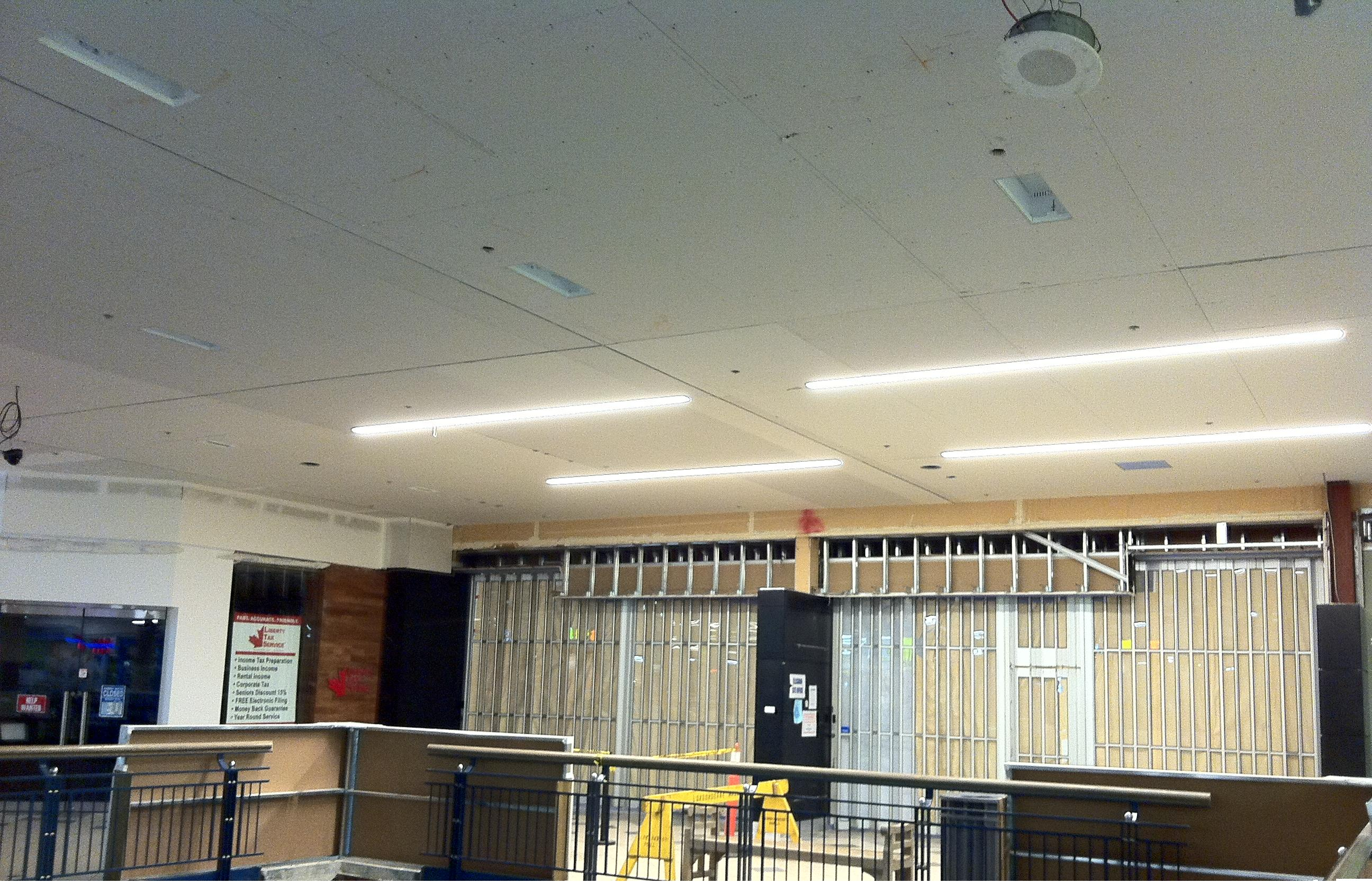
The old Sport Chek Supercentre being replaced by Simons in January 2015

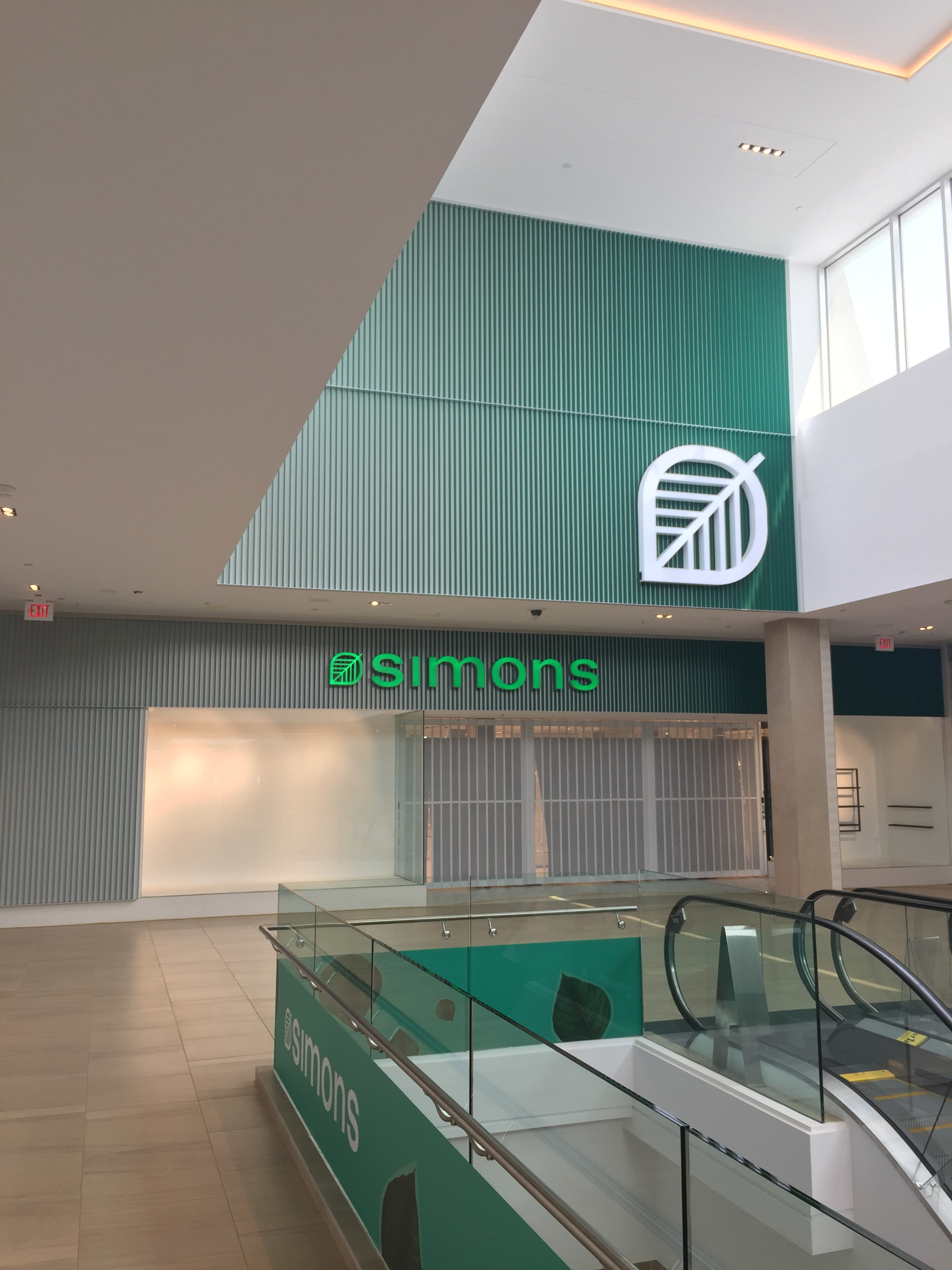
The new La Maison Simons store before its opening in August 2017.
