= Trampoline (advertising agency) =

Trampoline Creative Inc.
- Company type: Independent
- Industry: Marketing Communications
- Founded: 1988, 2004
- Headquarters: Halifax, Nova Scotia, Canada
- Area served: Canada, United States, Europe
- Key people: Leslie Gascoigne, Co-Owner; Mark Gascoigne, Co-Owner; Ian Bezanson, Co-Owner
- Services: Brand Advertising, Communication Strategy, Web and Mobile Development
- Website: http://trampolinebranding.com/

Trampoline is a full-service marketing, branding, advertising, web development and mobile agency headquartered in Halifax, Nova Scotia. The firm was founded in 1988 and originally named Page & Wood. The agency was renamed Trampoline Creative Inc. in 2004 and has operated as Trampoline and Trampoline Branding. In 2018, Trampoline publicly launched Twist by Trampoline, an agency within the agency dedicated to smaller businesses that wouldn't typically work with a larger agency. Late in 2018, Twist purchased BITS Creative agency, fully staffing itself to offer significant digital and web services beyond what Twist and Trampoline offered in the past.

In July 2011, Trampoline relocated its head office from Alexander Keith's Brewery Market complex to the former Carsand Mosher building at the corner of Blower Street and Barrington Street as part of the revitalization of Halifax's downtown core. In late 2019, the agency returned to the Brewery Market in the former CBCL building facing Hollis Street.

== Page & Wood ==
Page & Wood was founded in 1988 by Eric Wood and Dennis Page, father of actor Elliot Page. The firm was renamed Trampoline in 2004. Mark and Leslie Gascogine purchased the agency in 2007.

== Twist & Bits ==
Twist by Trampoline was founded as Brandbounce and later renamed. In late 2018, Twist also purchased Ian Bezanson's BITS Creative Agency which was founded in the early 2000s in the basement of Bezanson's home. Twist & Bits continues as an agency within the agency and a separate identity today, but is closely affiliated with Trampoline.

== Past and Current Clients ==
The following is an incomplete list of notable clients.

=== National or International ===
- Canada Post
- Charm Diamond Centres
- Empire Theatres
- Fondation Michaëlle Jean Foundation
- Ocean Nutrition Canada

=== Regional ===
- 2009 ICF Canoe Sprint World Championships
- Atlantic Film Festival
- Bell Aliant
- Discover Saint John
- Eastlink
- Halifax Comedy Festival
- Halifax Shopping Centre
- Injury Free Nova Scotia
- Nova Scotia Department of Health and Wellness
- Nova Scotia Fisheries and Aquaculture
- Nova Scotia Liquor Corporation
- Pierceys (RONA)
- Port of Halifax
- Saint Mary's University
- The Chronicle Herald
- Tourism Prince Edward Island

== Awards ==
- 2013 International Council of Shopping Centers, Canadian Shopping Centre Awards Silver (Event or Sales Promotion) "The Big Black Bow Event" for Halifax Shopping Centre
- 2012 Gold ICE Award (Print Campaign) "Ship in a bottle" for Tall Ships 2012
- 2012 ICE Craft Award (Retouching) "Ship in a bottle" for Tall Ships 2012
- 2012 Silver ICE Award (Interactive) "Bloom!" for Halifax Shopping Centre
- 2012 Fastest Growing Companies, No. 13 in More than $1 million but less than $25 million in revenue category
- 2012 International Council of Shopping Centers, Canadian Shopping Centre Awards Silver (Emerging Technology) "Bloom!" for Halifax Shopping Centre
- 2012 Design Edge Award (Best of Region) "Youth Addictions Awareness" for Nova Scotia Department of Health and Wellness
- 2012 Design Edge Award (Advertising: Outdoor) "Shelter Nova Scotia" for Shelter Nova Scotia
- 2011 Gold ICE Award (Broadcast, Public Service – Single) “Get the Goat” for Injury Free Nova Scotia
- 2011 Gold ICE Award (Online Initiative – Single) “Fall Haul” for the Halifax Shopping Centre
- 2011 International Council of Shopping Centers, Canadian Shopping Centre Awards Silver (Digital Media) "Start Fall with a Haul" for Halifax Shopping Centre
- 2011 Design Edge Award (Advertising: Outdoor) "Laughter's Infectious" for Halifax Comedy Festival
- 2011 Design Edge Award (Advertising: Print) "Keep your secrets secret" for Shredder's Inc.
- 2010 Gold ICE Award (Logo/Identity) Dafodil Place
- 2010 Gold ICE Award (Direct Mail) Shredder's Inc.
- 2009 Silver ICE Award (Print - Single) "Need to Know" for The Chronicle Herald
- 2009 Silver ICE Award (Print - Single) "Shelter's not easy to find" for Bide Awhile
- 2009 Silver ICE Award (Print - Campaign) "Need to Know" for The Chronicle Herald
- 2009 Silver ICE Award (Non-Traditional - Single or Campaign) "That's Life" for Saint Mary's University
- 2008 Gold ICE Award (Direct Mail - Single or Campaign) "Blueprints" for Pierceys
- 2005 Gold ICE Award (Newspaper - Single) "Scissors" for FRED
- 2005 Gold ICE Award (Newspaper - Campaign) "Scissors, Comb" for FRED
- 2005 Gold ICE Award (Out of Home - Campaign) "Scissors, Comb" for FRED
- 2005 Silver ICE Award (Newspaper - Single) "Telephone Wires" for Dalplex
- 2005 Silver ICE Award (Out of Home - Single) "Scissors" for FRED
- 2005 Merit, Advertising & Design Club of Canada (Newspaper - Single) "Telephone Wires" for Dalplex
