= Halifax Shopping Centre =

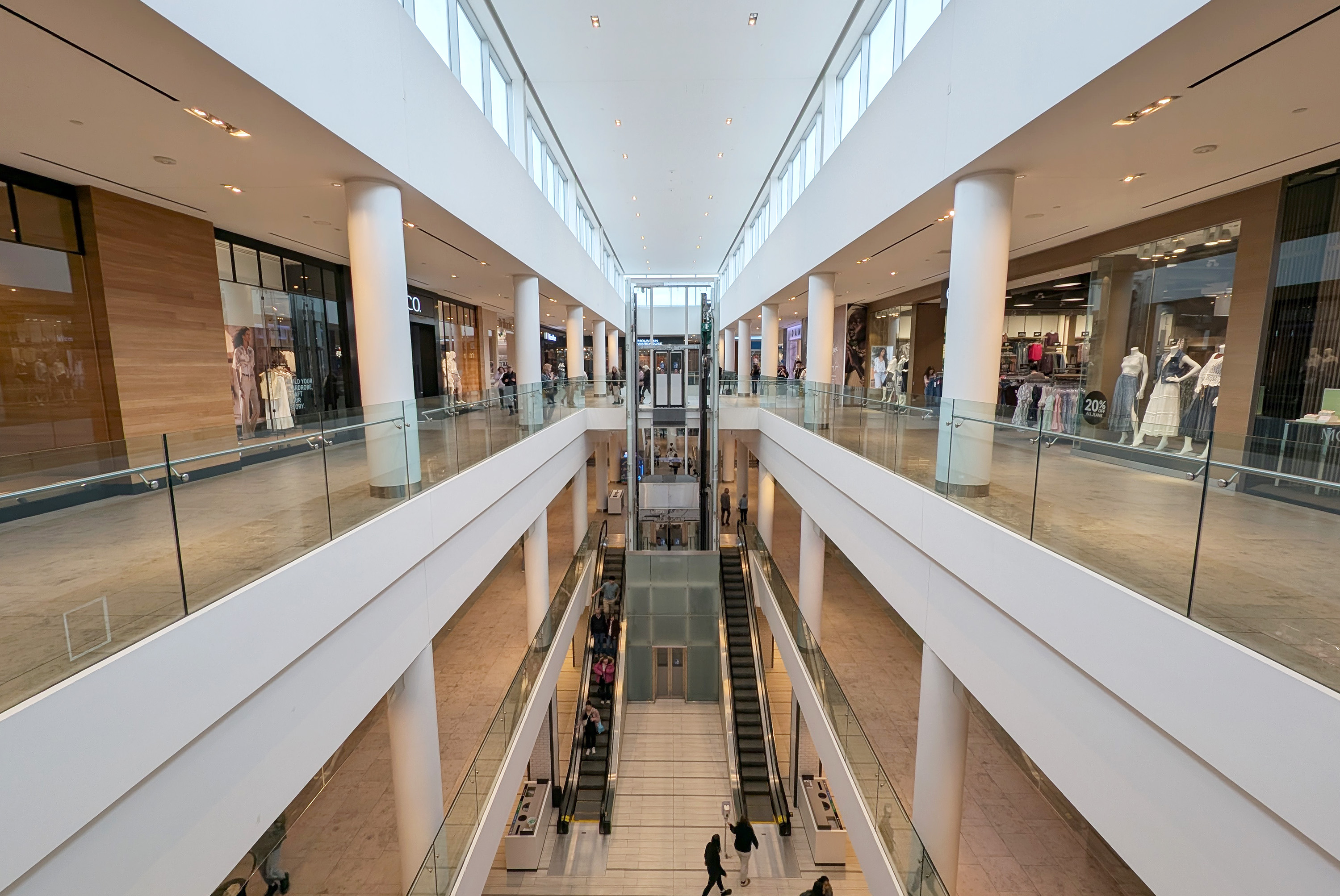
- Interior view (2025)
- Location: Halifax, Nova Scotia
- Coordinates: 44°38′51.54″N 63°37′11.15″W
- Address: 7001 Mumford Road
- Opened: 11 September 1962
- Developer: Trizec Corporation
- Owner: Primaris REIT
- Num. of stores: 160+
- Floor area: 1,298,445 sq ft (120,629.5 m^{2}); Including enclosed mall, Annex, Mumford Professional Centre and office towers
- Floors: 3
- Parking: 2,456
- Public transit: Halifax Transit (Mumford Terminal)
- Website: halifaxshoppingcentre.com

Halifax Shopping Centre, located in Halifax, Nova Scotia, is Atlantic Canada's largest multi-building shopping centre. Opened in 1962 as an enclosed mall anchored by department store Eaton's, the shopping centre is now owned by Primaris REIT. The largest anchor tenants are La Maison Simons, Winners, and Sportchek, while Sobeys and Walmart anchor the Halifax Shopping Centre Annex property across Mumford Road. Halifax Shopping Centre is also home to Mumford Terminal, a Halifax Transit bus interchange.

== History ==
=== Planning and construction ===
Eaton's applied for rezoning of the property, formerly the site of the St. Patrick's Home, in January 1956, and a public hearing was held on 15 March 1956. The City of Halifax approved the rezoning in August 1956 and subsequently agreed, in March 1957, to sell additional land to Eaton's to facilitate the shopping centre development. Webb and Knapp (Canada) Ltd. acquired the property from Eaton's in June 1959.

Halifax Shopping Centre was developed by Trizec Corporation, a joint venture formed in 1960 by Webb and Knapp and two British companies, Second Covent Garden Property Company Ltd. and Eagle Star Insurance Company. It was owned by Triton Shopping Centres Limited, which was established in 1961 as a wholly owned subsidiary of Trizec Corporation to invest in three new Canadian shopping centres, namely Brentwood Town Centre (Burnaby), Halifax Shopping Centre, and Yorkdale Shopping Centre (Toronto). Webb and Knapp encountered financial difficulties in 1963, and the following year sold its interest in Trizec Corporation to the other two co-owners.

Site clearance and preparation tenders were announced by Webb and Knapp in November 1960. Site preparation work began in February 1961 and was carried out by Tidewater Construction.

Detailed design began in October 1960. The complex was designed by Webb and Knapp staff working with Halifax architect Gregory Lambros and John Graham & Company, a United States architecture and engineering firm. Anglin-Norcross Maritime Limited was appointed as general contractor in May 1961. A building permit was issued in June 1961 and construction began immediately thereafter.

=== Opening ===
Halifax Shopping Centre opened at 9:30 am on Tuesday, September 11, 1962. The grand opening publicity claimed that "never in the history of Halifax have so many stores opened on one day!" The Thursday, September 13 edition of The Chronicle Herald included a thank you from Halifax Shopping Centre's owners, by Triton Ltd., which estimated the opening day crowd to have been 27,000 people.

The shopping centre initially had around 45 stores (380,000 square feet of retail space) and parking for over 1,800 cars. It was anchored by a three-storey, 153,000-square-foot Eaton's department store. This replaced an older Eaton's store on Barrington Street in downtown Halifax, which was sold in 1962 to the provincial government. The other end of the mall was anchored by a 25,705-square-foot Sobeys supermarket and a 22,380-square-foot Kresge's variety store.

Aside from retail space, the shopping centre opened with a 28,250-square-foot bowling alley on the lowest level as well as 18,105 square feet of office space on the upper level.

=== 1970s to 1990s ===
A three-storey, 100,000-square-foot (9,300 m^{2}) office-retail addition to the shopping centre opened in September 1975. Another expansion project, completed in 1979, added 51,000 square feet of retail space and 45,000 square feet of office space, bringing the total leasable area of the shopping centre to 544,000 square feet.

Halifax Shopping Centre was one of six shopping centres sold by Trizec Corporation in 1986, for C$525 million, to a newly created subsidiary of Bramalea Limited (itself a subsidiary of Trizec) called Trilea Centres. In 1989–90, Halifax Shopping Centre was expanded to include a food court, an additional 75,000 square feet (7,000 m^{2}) of retail space and three parking decks. A two-storey addition was built on the eastern side of the mall, and a second storey was added to the building's northern end. This expansion project was reported to have cost $70 million.

As part of a larger, $300-million transaction involving six properties, the Ontario Pension Board purchased a 50 per cent stake in the Halifax Shopping Centre from Bramalea in June 1994. Bramalea, $3.5 billion in debt, was declared bankrupt in April 1995. As a result, the Ontario Pension Board paid $154.6 million to acquire full ownership of Halifax Shopping Centre and three other regional malls in British Columbia and Ontario.

=== Since 2000 ===
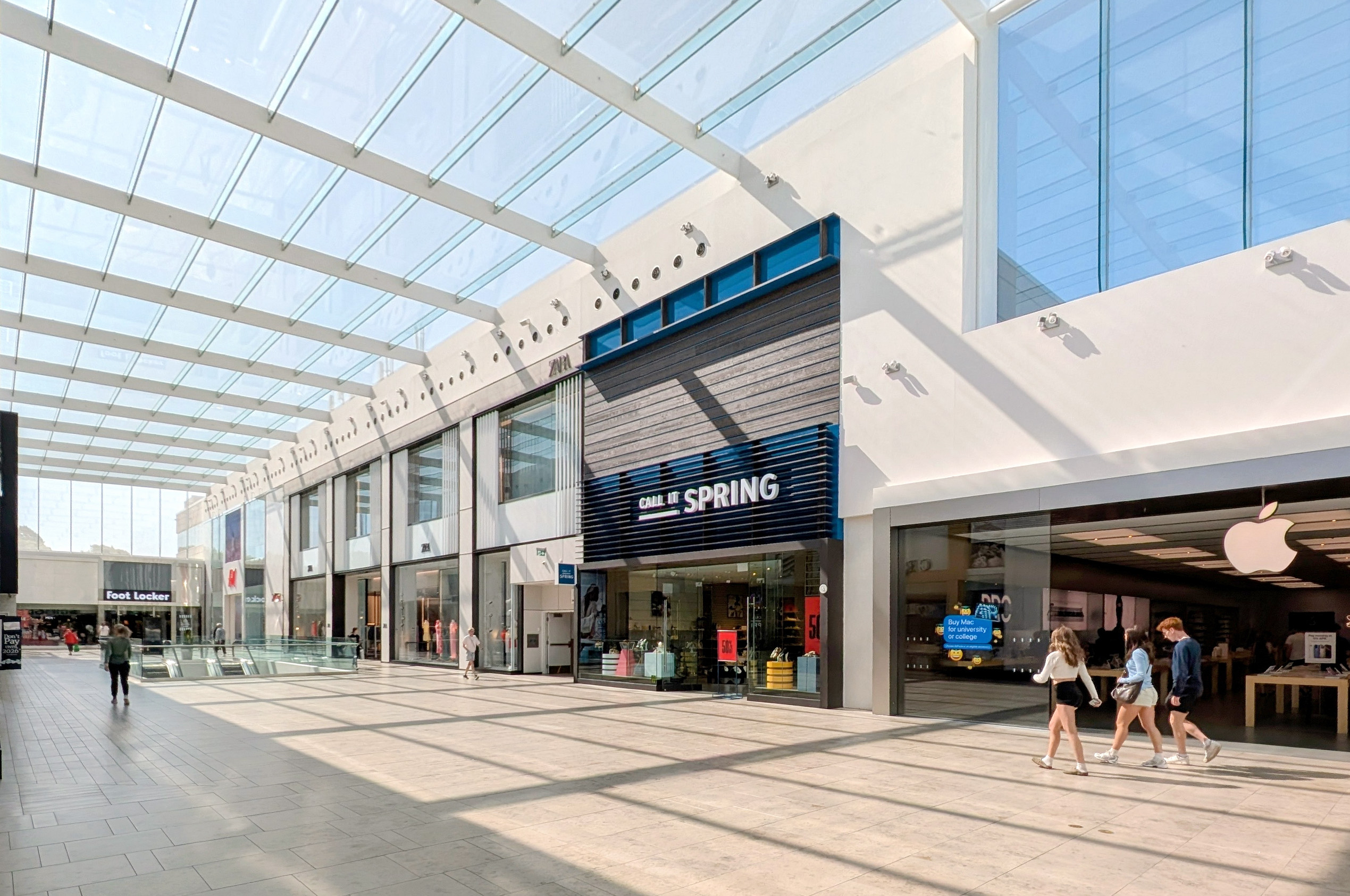
An Apple Store (pictured) opened in 2012.

In 2001, Halifax Shopping Centre purchased and renovated the former Sears store and surrounding land on the opposite side of Mumford Road, boosting total leasable area to over 1,061,361 square feet (98,603.7 m^{2}). The redevelopment was renamed Halifax Shopping Centre Annex. The Metro Transit (now Halifax Transit) Mumford Terminal was also relocated at this time.

In 2007, Halifax Shopping Centre underwent a major renovation to update the enclosed shopping centre, its decor and way-finding. In 2008, Halifax Shopping Centre purchased the West End Mall and redeveloped it into the property now known as the Mumford Professional Centre, boosting the total leasable area of the Halifax Shopping Centre development to 1,298,445 square feet (120,629.5 m^{2}).

In 2015, a mass shooting to take place at the mall on Valentine's Day was stopped after an anonymous Crime Stoppers tip. Police arrested two conspirators, while the third took his own life while police attempted to arrest him.

Also in 2015, a new $70 million renovation was underway at the Shopping Centre, replacing the Fairlanes bowling alley with a new food court called the Terrace. Several stores were being expanded, as well as 75,000 square feet (7,000 m^{2}) of leasable space being added to the Shopping Centre's main building, along with taller ceilings, more exterior windows, and a 14,000-square-foot skylight. Construction was completed in fall 2016.

In November 2023, Halifax Shopping Centre was sold by OPB Realty (the real estate arm of the Ontario Pension Board) to Primaris REIT for $370 million.

Another renovation project, carried out from 2022 to 2024 at an estimated cost of $52 million, created a new entrance to the shopping centre and repurposed the former three-storey Sears space to accommodate new retailers including La Maison Simons and Winners. Simons opened on March 21, 2024, and is the largest anchor store within the enclosed mall.

== Stores and services ==
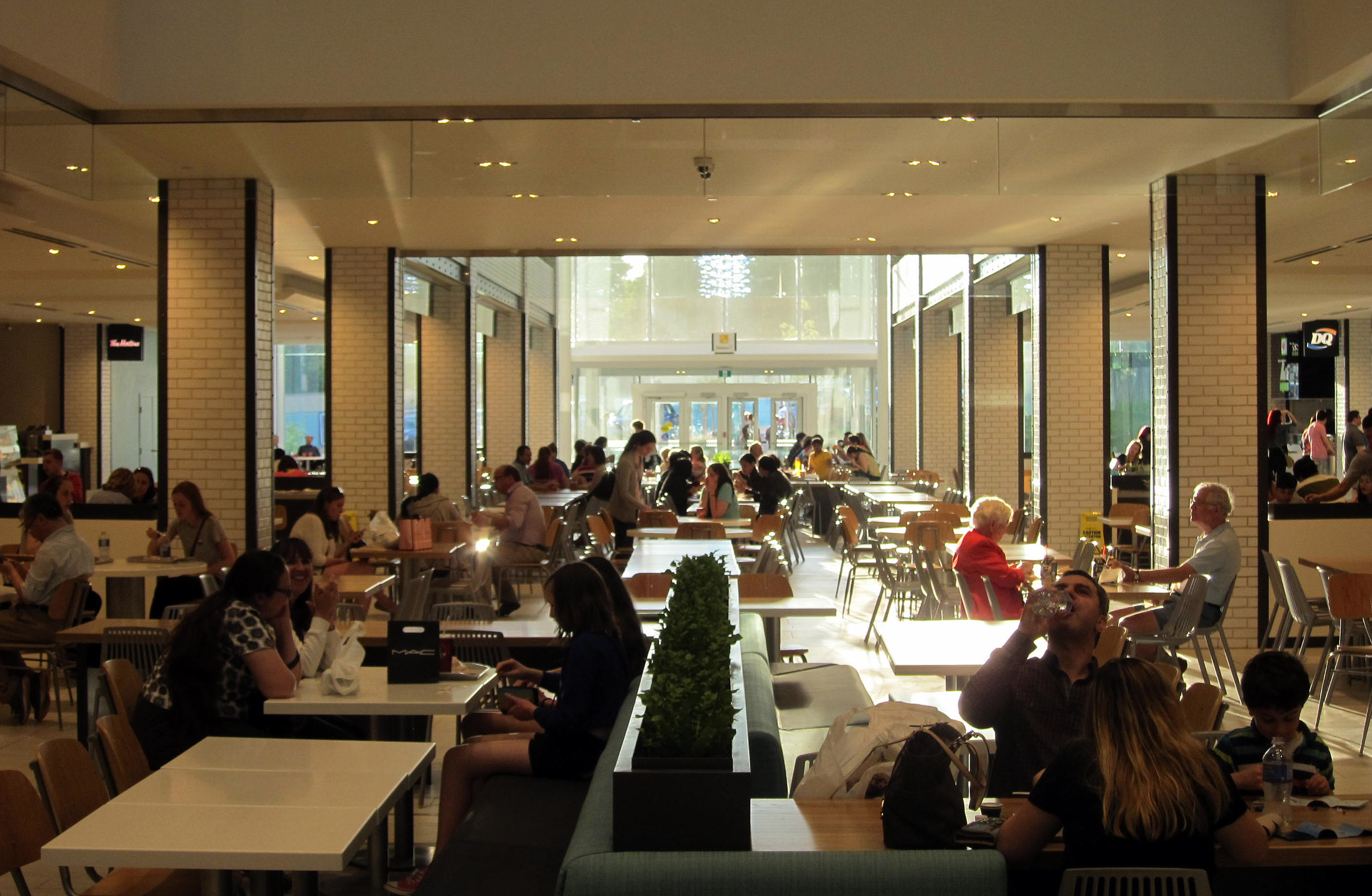
New food court pictured in 2016

Halifax Shopping Centre contains over 170 stores within the enclosed mall and adjacent annex. The majority of the enclosed centre's vendors are fashion and premium fashion purveyors. This is the only Atlantic Canadian location for many prominent retailers, including Apple, Aritzia, Browns, L'Occitane en Provence, Michael Kors, and La Maison Simons.

The centre also contains stores specializing in cosmetics, athletic and casual footwear for men, women and children, children's clothing stores, bath and beauty products, electronics, jewellery, sporting equipment, specialty foods, greeting cards, vitamins and supplements, cellphone and tablet cases, books, gifts, and other unique items.

== Layout and architecture ==
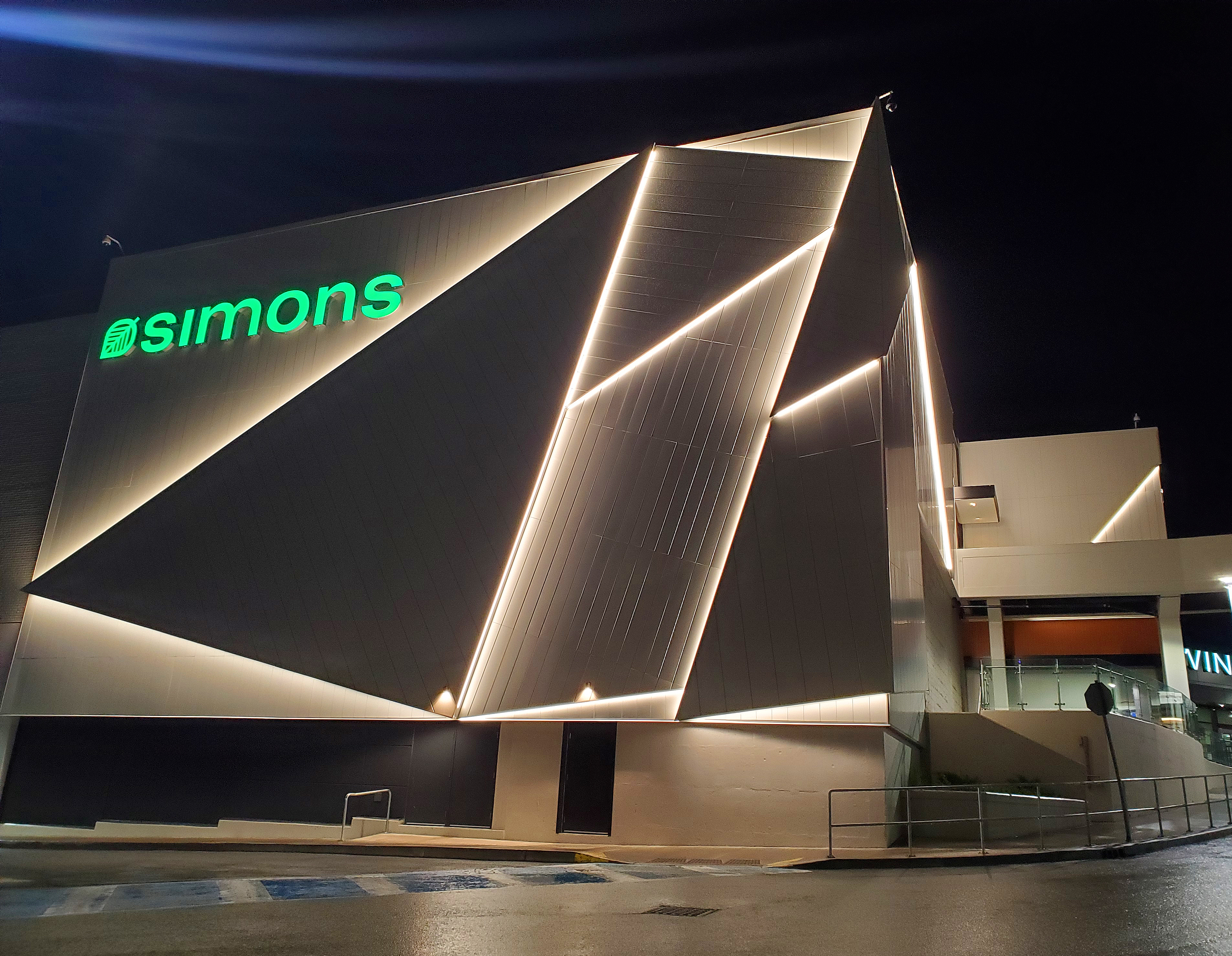
Exterior facade resembling the Bluenose

The shopping centre consists of two main elements: an enclosed mall on the north side of Mumford Road, and a property on the south side of Mumford Road with a combination of plaza-style retailers, large-format stores, a bus terminal, and a professional centre.

The enclosed shopping centre has 641,585 square feet (59,605.2 m^{2}) of leasable area and attracts over 110,000 people each week. The mall surrounds an office building called "Halifax Place" and is flanked by three parking garages.

The portion of the property on the south side of Mumford Road is called the Halifax Shopping Centre Annex and has an additional 419,776 square feet (38,998.5 m^{2}) of leasable area, including a 53,846 square feet (5,002.5 m^{2}) office tower, Chebucto Place. Mumford Professional Centre is immediately adjacent to the annex property and represents an additional 237,084 square feet (22,025.8 m^{2}) of leaseable space.

== Transportation ==
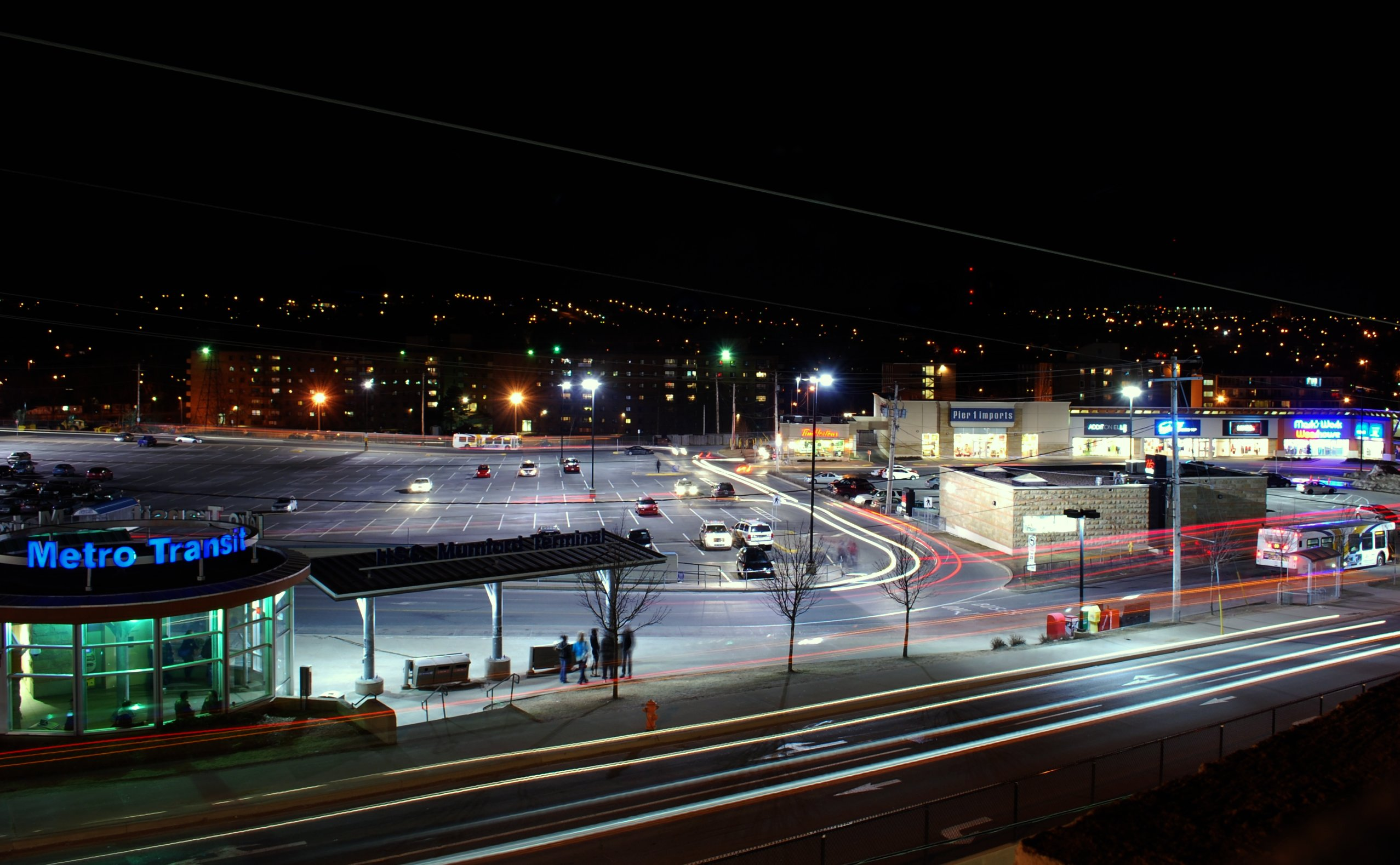
Mumford Terminal and Annex property at night

Halifax Shopping Centre is located in the west end of the Halifax Peninsula. It is accessible by car from Bayers Road and Mumford Road. The Halifax Shopping Centre Annex property stretches from Mumford Road to Chebucto Road and the nearby Armdale traffic circle.

The shopping centre also includes a Halifax Transit terminal, referred to as Mumford Terminal, which is located in the Annex development, immediately across Mumford Road from the enclosed primary shopping centre building. The Halifax Shopping Centre Annex parking lot is also a designated Park and Ride location.

Mumford Terminal is accessible via the following Halifax Transit routes:

- 1 Spring Garden
- 2 Fairview
- 3 Crosstown
- 9 Greystone (9A)/Herring Cove (9B)
- 22 Armdale
- 24 Leiblin Park
- 25 Governors Brook
- 26 Springvale
- 28 Bayers Lake
- 29 Barrington
- 91 Hemlock Ravine
- 415 Purcells Cove

There are plans to build a new, enlarged Mumford Terminal on part of the shopping centre parking lot. The project, endorsed by Halifax Regional Council in 2019, is intended to add capacity and improve the passenger experience.

== See also ==
- List of largest shopping malls in Canada
