= John Hamilton Simons =

Canadian merchant (1823–1906)

- Born: May 25, 1823; Lac-Beauport
- Died: May 6, 1906 (aged 82); Quebec City
- Burial place: Mount Hermon Cemetery; 46.78004°N 71.24817°W
- Occupation: Merchant
- Known for: Founder of La Maison Simons
- Children: 10

John Hamilton Simons (25 May 1823 – 6 May 1906) was a Canadian merchant of Scottish origin and the founder of La Maison Simons, one of the oldest department store chains in Quebec.

== Early life ==
Simons was the eldest son of Scottish immigrants Margaret McNeill and Peter Simons. The Simons family settled on land in Saint-Dunstan-du-Lac-Beauport granted by the British government to demobilized English soldiers, a category in which Peter Simons belonged.

As a teenager, John worked as a clerk at the Laurier general store to help support his family. In 1840 at the age of 17, he opened a small retail shop at the corner of Saint-Jean and Sainte-Angèle streets, near the Saint-Jean Gate in Quebec City. Specializing in haberdashery and drapery, much of his merchandise was imported from the British Isles: leather from England, woollens from Scotland, and linen from Ireland. He travelled overseas roughly twice a year to source high-quality goods, a practice that helped distinguish him from his competitors.

== Career ==
In November 1858, Simons signed a public letter to Mayor Hector-Louis Langevin, urging him to seek re-election. The signatories praised Langevin’s zeal, energy, and administrative capacity, particularly his work on the city’s aqueduct system and financial reforms, and pledged their support for his candidacy.

In February 1866, Simons placed a newspaper advertisement announcing a clearance sale at his shop, then located at 5 côte de la Fabrique. The notice promoted “dry goods, tasteful articles, and haberdashery” offered at “very reduced prices for cash” in order to make room for the store’s spring imports. This type of seasonal sale reflected both the competitive retail environment of mid-19th-century Quebec and Simons’s regular practice of importing fresh merchandise from Europe to meet customer demand.

In 1867, Simons entered into partnership with Archibald Foulds under the name Simons and Foulds, relocating the business to 20 côte de la Fabrique two years later, a site which continues to serve as the company’s headquarters today.

In December 1876, John Simons was among a group of concerned business owners in Quebec City who signed a public petition urging the city authorities to convene an assembly to review municipal regulations for the protection of public buildings against fire. The petition reflected Simons’ involvement in local civic affairs and concern for public safety.

In 1892, the partnership of Simons & Foulds was formally dissolved as John Simons retired. While Simons retired, the well-known company name would be retained, with business operations continuing under Archibald Foulds.

In 1893, Archibald Simons succeeded his father in the company and, five years later, partnered with Jean Minguy under the name Simons and Minguy. In 1918, the company came entirely under family ownership and management.

== Personal life ==
Simons was presbyterian and married Ellen Kelly on 2 May 1849. The couple had several children, including Archibald Simons, who would later take over the family business, as well as William Thomas, Elly, Lily, John, Edith Allan, Mary, William, Gordon, and George. Following Ellen Kelly’s death in 1897, Simons married Jane Sangster on 1 June 1899, in Lac-Beauport. Two days later, on 3 June 1899, while visiting Bury, Quebec, John Simons and his wife welcomed the birth of a son.

He lived in Quebec City for much of his life and died there. He was buried in Sillery.

== See also ==
- Act of Union 1840
- English-speaking Quebecers
- History of Quebec City
- Lower Canada
- Old Quebec
- Scots-Quebecers
