= Alfred Bersbach House =

Historic house in Illinois, United States

- U.S. National Register of Historic Places
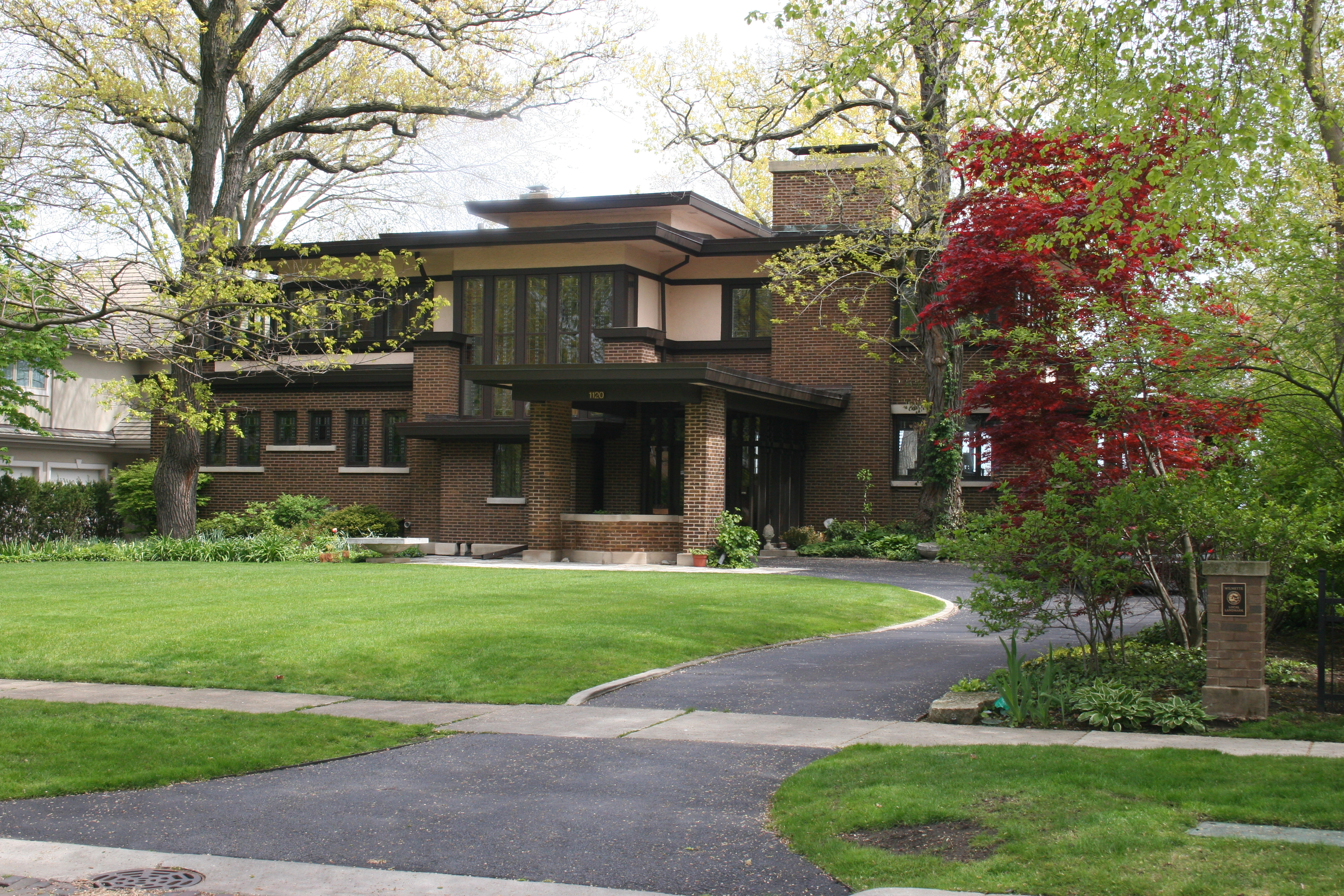

- Location within Illinois Location within the United States
- Location: 1120 Michigan Ave., Wilmette, Illinois
- Coordinates: 42°4′57″N 87°41′39″W
- Area: less than one acre
- Built: 1915
- Architect: John S. Van Bergen
- Architectural style: Prairie School
- NRHP reference No.: 03000941
- Added to NRHP: September 17, 2003

The Alfred Bersbach House is a John S. Van Bergen-designed house in Wilmette, Illinois. Built in 1915, it is reflective of the Prairie School approach to house architecture. Architectural historian Carl W. Condit and others considered the house to be Van Bergen's masterpiece.

== History ==
Alfred Bersbach was born in Chicago, Illinois on November 5, 1856. The son of immigrants, Bersbach worked his way up to company president of the Manz Printing and Engraving Company. His son, Frank, would also lead the company. Bersbach was involved with the Chicago Historical Society, Freemasonry, and the Chicago Athletic Association. He commissioned John S. Van Bergen to design a house in Wilmette, Illinois, in 1914. Bersbach sold the house to Eva A. Schram on July 20, 1920; she owned the house for over thirty years.

The house was recorded by the Historic American Buildings Survey in 1967. On September 17, 2003, the house was recognized by the National Park Service with a listing on the National Register of Historic Places.

== Architecture ==
The Alfred Bersbach House was completed in 1915 and is found at 1120 Michigan Avenue in Wilmette. The house is heavily influenced by Frank Lloyd Wright, and it is often mistaken for one of his designs. The house was mistakenly advertised as a Wright design in real estate listings in the 1950s and 1970s. The two-story house is a Prairie School design of brick and stucco; brick dominates the first story while stucco features in the second story. It includes a long, flat roof with deep eaves, typical of the style. The foundation is Indiana limestone and walls are built with beige and brown bricks. The mortar is stained in a color reflective of the sand in a nearby beach. Brick piers, topped with wooden planters, are used at the outside corners of major rooms. All exterior wood is cypress. Art glass is used throughout the house.
