= Ohio Electric =

Ohio Electric can refer to:

- Ohio Electric Railway
- Ohio Electric Car Company
