= McAvoy Brewing Company =

American brewery

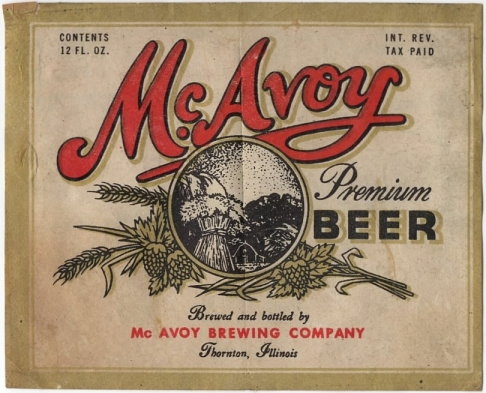
- Industry: Brewing
- Founded: Chicago, Illinois, U.S. (1865)
- Founder: Henry V. Bemis; John H. McAvoy
- Defunct: 1920
- Headquarters: 23rd South Park Way, Chicago, Illinois, U.S.
- Key people: John H. McAvoy
- Products: Beer

McAvoy Brewing Company (founded in 1865 as Bemis & Rindge Brewery by Henry V. Bemis) was run by John H. McAvoy in Chicago, Illinois and was one of Chicago's largest breweries before Prohibition. Coinciding with the Eighteenth Amendment going into effect on January 16, 1920, the brewery closed in 1920.

== History ==
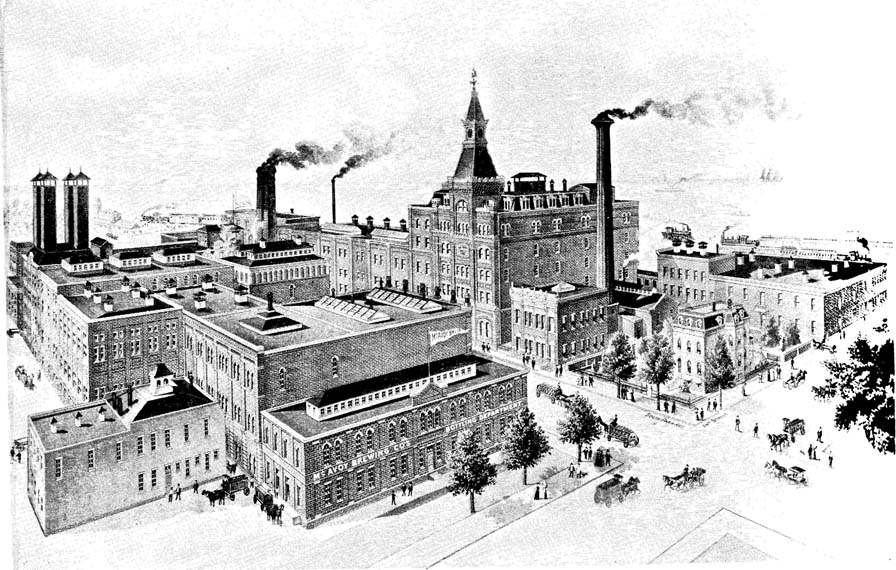
McAvoy Brewery on 24th Street and South Park

=== Early history ===
In 1865, the brewery began in a three-story brick building close to the corner of South Park Avenue and 23rd Street along Lake Michigan. In the early 1870s, a malt house was constructed next to the original building, along with 4 ice houses on the western side of the avenue in 1872, 1874, 1875, and 1876. In 1878 and 1879, two more ice houses were constructed on the east side of South Park Avenue. A substantial brick barn was built in 1878 and office building was built in 1879.

In 1901, the company employed over one hundred men and the chief brewer was Fritz Hieronimus. Hieronimus learned the trade in Germany at Frankfort-on-the-Main, a well known school for brewers at the time. In 1890, Hieronimus was elected as an honorary members of the United States Brewmasters' Association. Until 1882, the officers of the company were:

- Austin J. Doyle, President
- Adam Ortseifen, Vice President
- H. T. Bellamy, Secretary and Treasurer

Doyle was Chicago's former Chief of Police and later became manager of the Illinois State Brewers' Association.

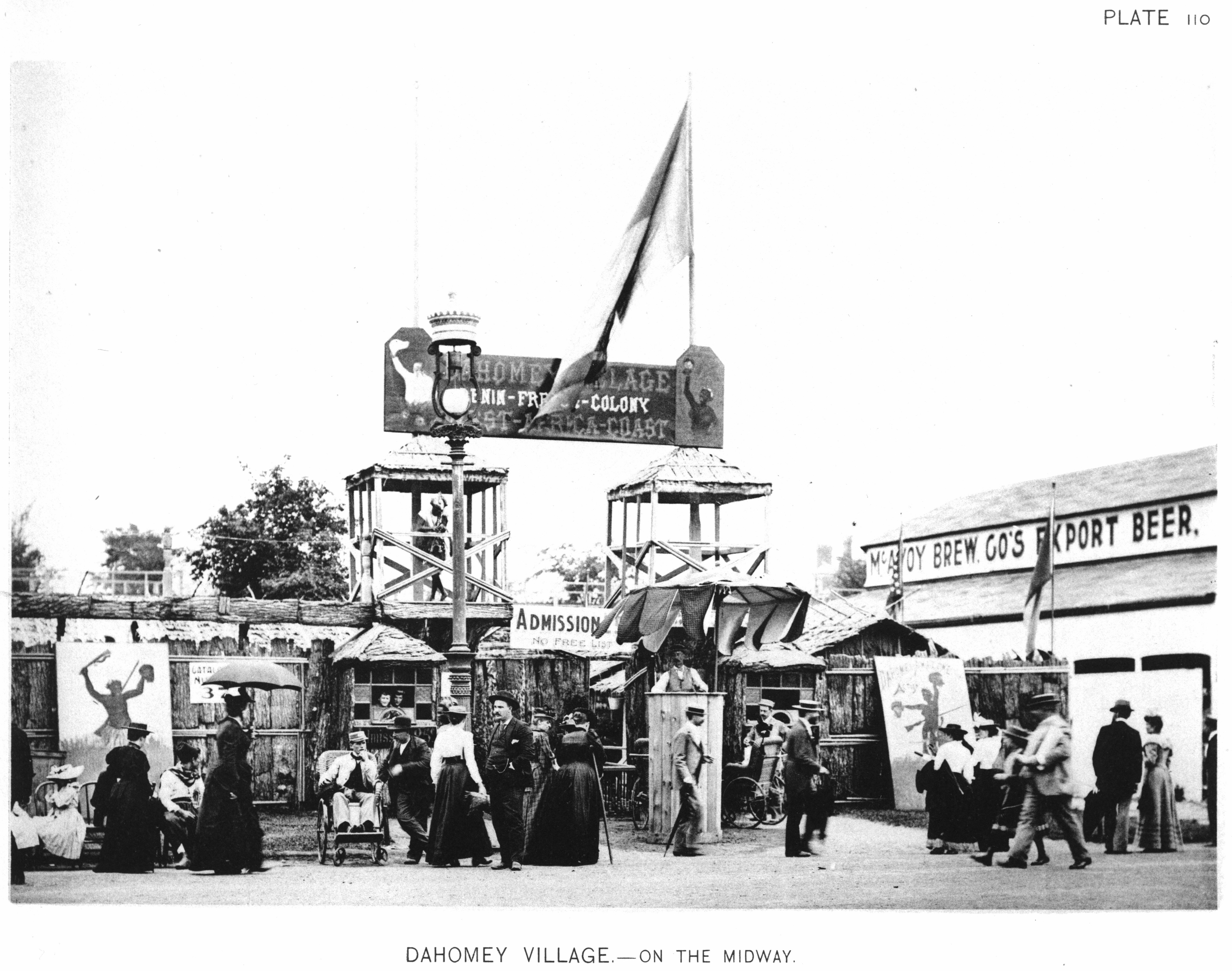
McAvoy Brewing Company located beside the Dahomy Village at Midway Plaisance during the World's Columbian Exposition, 1893

=== McAvoy involvement ===
From 1882 until 1920, John H. McAvoy was president of the company. McAvoy was the brother-in-law of Peter Leyendecker, who came from Germany in 1882 with his family to work with McAvoy. Leyendecker was the father of American illustrators J.C. Leyendecker and Frank X. Leyendecker. In 1889, the McAvoy Brewery, along with the Wacker & Birk Brewery were sold to an English Syndicate, the Chicago Breweries Limited. After joining the syndicate, McAvoy continued to use the same name and management. McAvoy was instrumental and securing funding to return John Brown's Fort back to West Virginia after it had been brought to Chicago in 1892 for display at the World's Columbian Exposition. In 1893, in-house bottling was installed and McAvoy was among the largest breweries in Chicago.

=== Prohibition ===
As the Prohibition movement began, the cultural landscape changed and the business began a downturn. In 1920, the Brewery closed, which coincided with the Eighteenth Amendment going into effect on January 16, 1920.

== Timeline ==
- 1862-64, Bemis & Rindge Brewery
- 1864-69, Downer, Bemis & Co.
- 1869-82, Downer & Bemis Brewing Co.
- 1882-87, Bemis & McAvoy Brewing Co.
- 1887-1920, McAvoy Brewing Co.
