= John H. McAvoy =

Chicago Alderman from 4th ward
- In office 1869–1873 Serving with Alan C. Calkins (1869–1870); Harvey M. Thompson (1870–1874); George H. Sidwell (1872-1873)
- Preceded by: Samuel McRoy
- Succeeded by: Jesse Spaulding

Personal details
- Born: November 2, 1830 Ireland
- Died: July 24, 1893 (aged 62) Chicago, Illinois
- Occupation: Entrepreneur
- Known for: Founder of the McAvoy Brewing Company

John H. McAvoy (1830-1893) was the founder of the McAvoy Brewing Company in Chicago, Illinois, and was elected a Chicago alderman from the 3rd ward of Chicago in 1869 and re-elected in 1871. He served as Chicago City Council president in 1871, during the rebuilding of Chicago after the Great Chicago Fire.
