= Jacob Manz =

Swiss-born, Chicago-based engraver

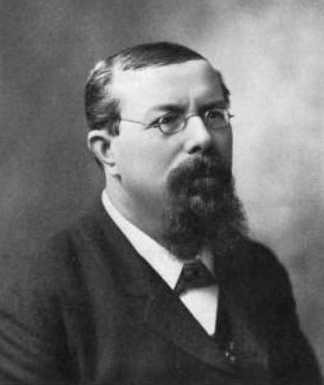
- Born: October 1, 1837; Marthalen, Switzerland
- Died: April 25, 1916 (aged 78); Chicago, Illinois
- Resting place: Graceland Cemetery
- Occupation: Engraver
- Spouses: Carolina Knoepfli (m. 1859; died 1866) Johanna Hesse (m. 1867)
- Children: 6

Jacob Manz Jr. (October 1, 1837 – April 25, 1916) was, from 1855 until his death, a Chicago-based engraver and founding partner of J. Manz Engraving Company.

== Biography ==
Jacob Manz was born in Marthalen, Switzerland on October 1, 1837, the oldest son of Jacob Manz Sr. He had been apprenticed to a firm for wood engraving in Schaffhausen, where he stayed until he was sixteen years old. Through the dissolution of partnership of his employers, he was unable to finish the prescribed term of his apprenticeship, but his natural ability and industry had already made him a skillful engraver. He immediately set out for America, crossing the ocean on a sailing vessel, and arriving in Chicago in the middle of July 1855. He soon found employment with S. D. Childs & Company, with whom he worked for six years; for the next five years he worked under W. D. Baker, a well-known Chicago engraver. After a short period with Bond and Chandler, he formed a partnership with another engraver and formed a business partnership with him in 1866.

=== Maas & Manz ===
The firm, initially named Maas & Manz, and was first located at the corner of Clark and Washington Streets, and was two years later moved to Dearborn and Madison. While there, Mr. Manz became the sole proprietor of the business, by purchasing the interest of his partner, and was a very heavy loser in the great fire of 1871, realizing almost nothing of insurance. He had faith, however, in himself and the city, and very soon opened a shop on West Madison Street, near Union, whence he shortly removed to Clinton and Lake Streets. He subsequently occupied locations on LaSalle, Madison, and Dearborn Streets, then Nos. 183 to 187 Monroe Street. The business was incorporated, becoming known as J. Manz & Company, of which Manz was president, F. D. Montgomery vice-president, and Alfred Bersbach secretary and treasurer.

== Family ==
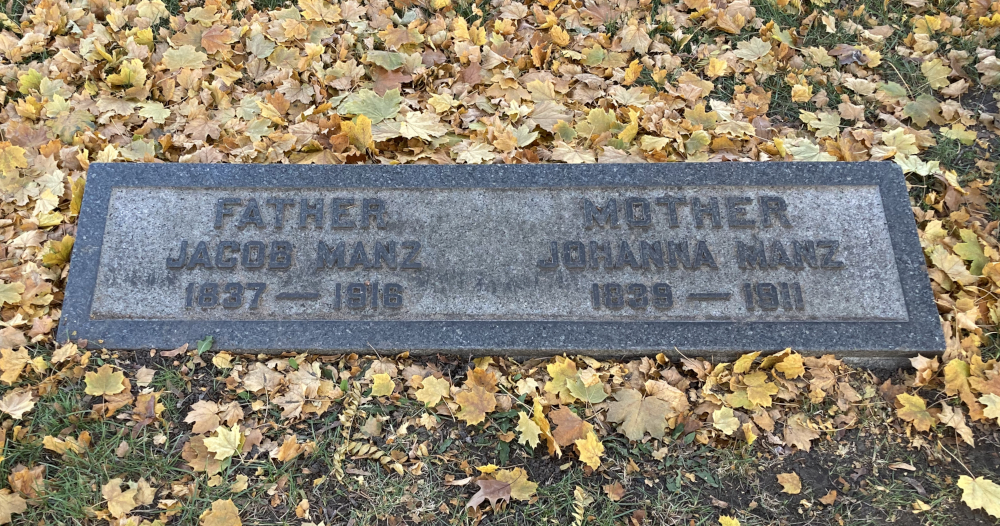
Manz's grave at Graceland Cemetery

Manz was twice married. On January 6, 1859, he married Carolina Knoepfli, who died September 7, 1866. She was a native of Ossingen, Switzerland. They had two children: Caroline Manz (1861–1913) and William Manz (1862–1904). On November 24, 1867, he married Johanna Hesse (1839–1911), who was born in Crivitz, Germany. Their children were Ida Manz Boerlin (1869–1934), Paul Henry (1874–1938), Adolph William, and Helen Manz York (1880–1961).

He died in Chicago on April 25, 1916, after falling from a window of his home. He was buried at Graceland Cemetery.
