= Frank Xavier Leyendecker =

American illustrator

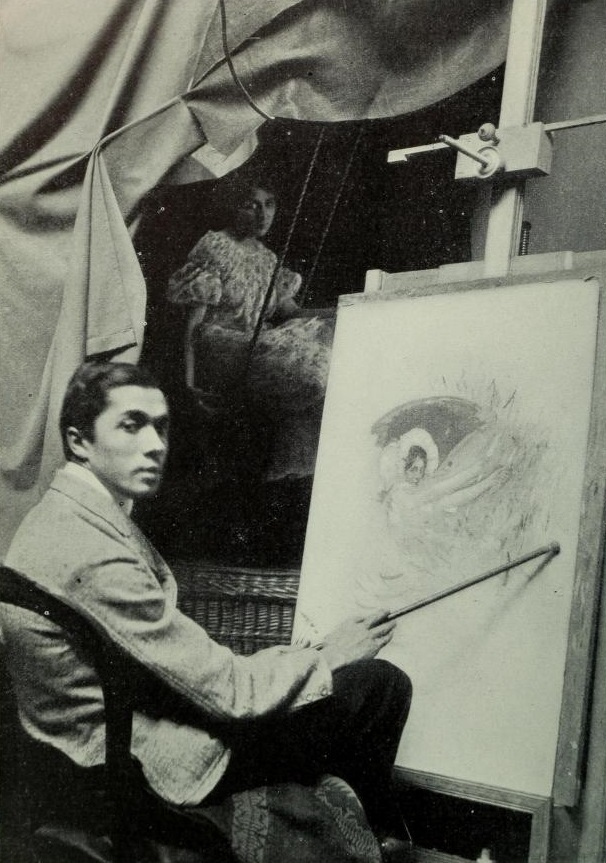
- Frank Leyendecker in his studio
- Born: Franz Xavier Leyendecker; January 19, 1876; Montabaur, Germany
- Died: April 18, 1924 (aged 48); New Rochelle, New York
- Education: Art Institute of Chicago, Académie Julian, Paris
- Known for: Commercial art/illustration
- Relatives: J. C. Leyendecker (brother)

Frank Xavier Leyendecker (January 19, 1876 – April 18, 1924), also known as Frank James Leyendecker, was a German-American commercial artist and illustrator. He worked with his brother Joseph Christian Leyendecker first in Chicago, then later in New York City and New Rochelle, New York. He is best known for his magazine cover art for Vogue, Vanity Fair, and Life, but also provided artwork for a large number of advertisers.

== Biography ==
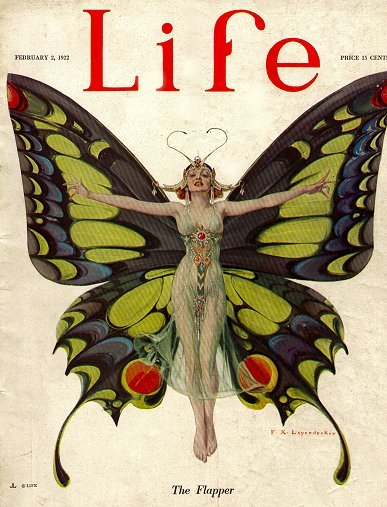
1922 Life cover: "The Flapper" by F. X. Leyendecker

Franz Xavier Leyendecker was born in Montabaur, Germany on January 19, 1876. In 1882, he immigrated with his parents and three siblings to Chicago where his mother's uncle, John McAvoy, owned the McAvoy Brewery. In Chicago, he studied at the Art Institute. From 1895 to 1897 he studied at the Académie Julian in Paris, France.

He was known for his stained glass work as well as his illustrations for posters, books, magazines and advertisements. He provided artwork for ads for Kum-a-Part jewelry, E. Howard Watch Company, Franklin automobiles, Kuppenheimer clothes, Right Posture clothes, Ohio Electric Car Company, Remington Arms/Union Metallic Cartridge, Durham hosiery, and BVD underwear. He painted covers for a large number of mass-readership magazines including Street & Smith pulp magazines, such as People's Favorite Magazine and The Popular Magazine, as well as for Fawcett's pulp magazine Battle Stories. His artwork for Battle Stories was initially produced as a WWI recruitment poster and reprinted as a pulp magazine cover by Fawcett Publications in 1931. His work was described as an "important feature" of the second exhibition of the Society of Illustrators at the International gallery in New York.

Leyendecker served as the judge in the first Strathmore Water Color Contest, sponsored by the Mittineague Paper Company of Massachusetts.

Frank Leyendecker, Joseph Leyendecker, their sister Augusta Mary Leyendecker, and the model Charles A. Beach lived for a time in a large house built and co-owned by the two brothers in New Rochelle, New York. Frank moved out from the home in 1923.

Leyendecker was suffering from depression and poor health due to his ongoing drug addiction when he died, most likely by suicide, of a morphine overdose on April 18, 1924, at the age of 48.
