= Frank John Bersbach Sr. =

American businessman (1888–1929)

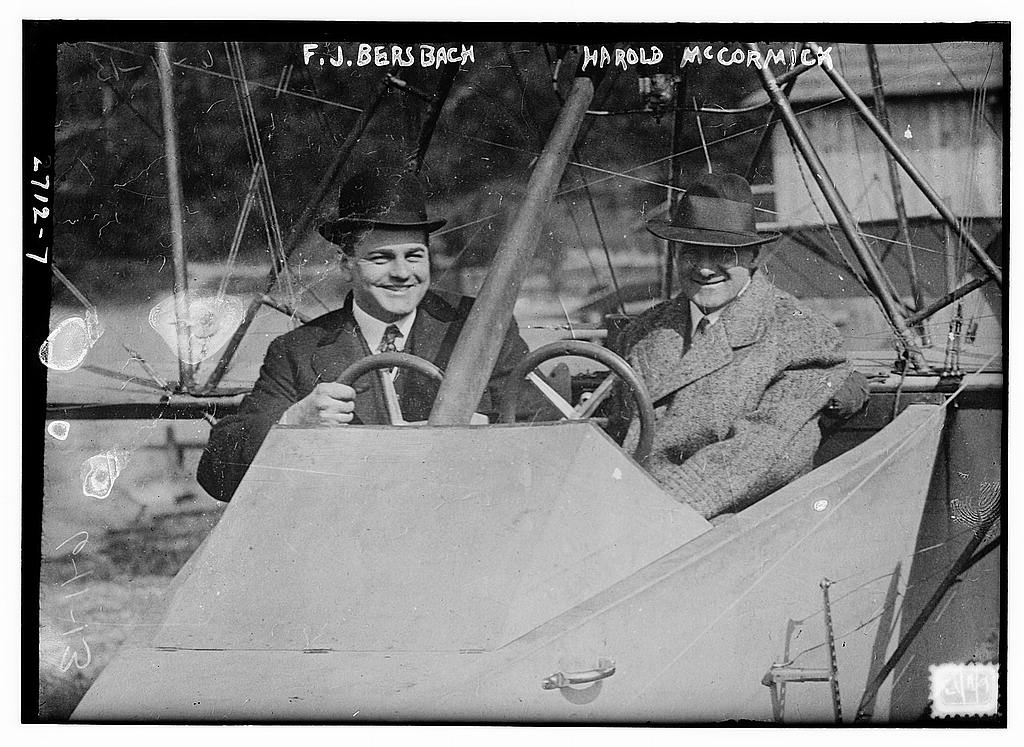
Frank John Bersbach Sr. and Harold Fowler McCormick in Logan Archbold Vilas's flying boat in 1913

Frank John Bersbach Sr. (December 16, 1888 - January 26, 1929) was the vice president and general manager of the Manz Corporation.

== Biography ==
He was born on December 16, 1888, in Chicago, Illinois. He married Johanna Brentano. He died on January 26, 1929.

== Legacy ==
Bersbach Sr.'s legacy was his son, Frank John Bersback Jr. His son would be the first of five husbands to Florida socialite Durie Malcolm, whose later third husband was the future 35th U.S. President John Fitzgerald Kennedy, whom she secretly married on January 24, 1947, in Palm Beach, Florida, before he later married Jacqueline Bouvier. Frank John Jr. later married actress Dorothy Lee.

According to a book by Antoinette Giancana about her father, Mafia boss Sam Giancana, JFK's father Joseph P. Kennedy Sr. went to Sam Giancana and asked him to find a way to have the marriage annulled and the legal documents destroyed – which he reportedly did.
