= Manz Corporation =

- Industry: Printing
- Founded: 1866; 159 years ago
- Founder: Jacob Manz
- Defunct: 1962; 63 years ago
- Headquarters: Chicago

The Manz Corporation was a Chicago color printer incorporated in 1866 as the J. Manz Engraving Company.

== History ==
It was incorporated in 1866 as the J. Manz Engraving Company by Jacob Manz, who was the company president, and was built in 1867 in Chicago to act as a wood engraving business. The company moved to premises at 4001-43 Ravenswood Av. in Chicago in 1908, just after it merged with The Hollister Press. It had purchased the property from Mrs. Harriet L. Sulzer and others for USD16,000. By 1922 it was known as the Manz Engraving Co. and employed 500–600 people. The company president was now Alfred Bersbach, who had joined the company in 1880. On January 1, 1925, the company changed its name to the Manz Corporation.

In 1947 the corporation purchased and moved to a one-story factory from which to run the business. In the same year, the corporation and its president at the time, Virgil Lynch, were charged with "performing paper cutting operations" at late hours of night that disturbed the peace of the entire neighborhood. This, however, would not seem to change over the years, as, in 1962, the corporation was ranked as being "noisier than 97 per cent of all industry in Chicago" by the city zoning board.

The corporation was purchased in April 1961 by Process Lithographers. Due to this, the name of the corporation was changed to Process Manz Press Inc. On November 21, 1962, the buildings and equipment of Process Manz Press Inc. were seized by New York financial institution A.J. Armstrong Inc., and on November 23, 1962, Process Manz Press Inc. was declared involuntarily bankrupt.

== Employees ==
- Virgil Regis Lynch, President.
- Frank John Bersbach, Sr. (1888–1929) was the vice president and general manager.
- Oscar Julius Bersbach (?-1927), secretary and assistant treasurer.
- Joseph Christian Leyendecker, illustrator
- Sigurd Vogt, illustrator.
- Eugene P. Pattberg, Eastern representative.
- J. Lewis Coath, manager of the picture and calendar department.
