= Ohio Electric Car Company =

Early American electric car company

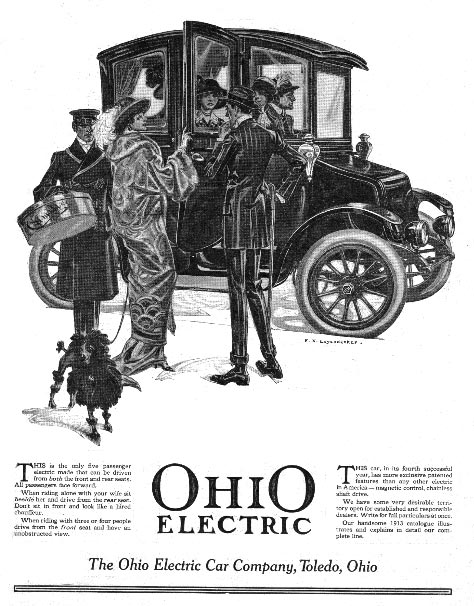
- Advertisement by Frank Xavier Leyendecker
- Type: Company
- Industry: Automobile
- Founded: 1909
- Founder: James Brown Bell, Henry P. Dodge, Rathbun Fuller, Robert E. Lee and Henry E. Marvin
- Defunct: 1918
- Headquarters: Toledo, Ohio, United States
- Key people: George W. Shaw

Ohio Electric Car Company was a brass era electric car company founded in 1909 in Toledo, Ohio.

== History ==
James Brown Bell, Henry P. Dodge, Rathbun Fuller, Robert E. Lee and Henry E. Marvin founded the company in September 1909. The company was based in Toledo, Ohio. In 1910 the production of automobiles began. The brand name was Ohio. Initially part of the Milburn Wagon Company facility was used before moving OECC to its own facility in 1911.

Twelve vehicles were built in 1910, 300 in 1915 and 650 the following year. In 1915 M.V. Barbour became the president, C.M. Foster the vice president and general manager, and Herman H. Brand the secretary and treasurer. In 1917 George W. Shaw became the president. At that time business was already declining, so half of the company's activities consisted of building bodies for other car manufacturers.

The production ended in 1918.

There is no connection to the Ohio Motor Car Company, which used the same brand name from 1909 to 1912.

== Vehicles ==
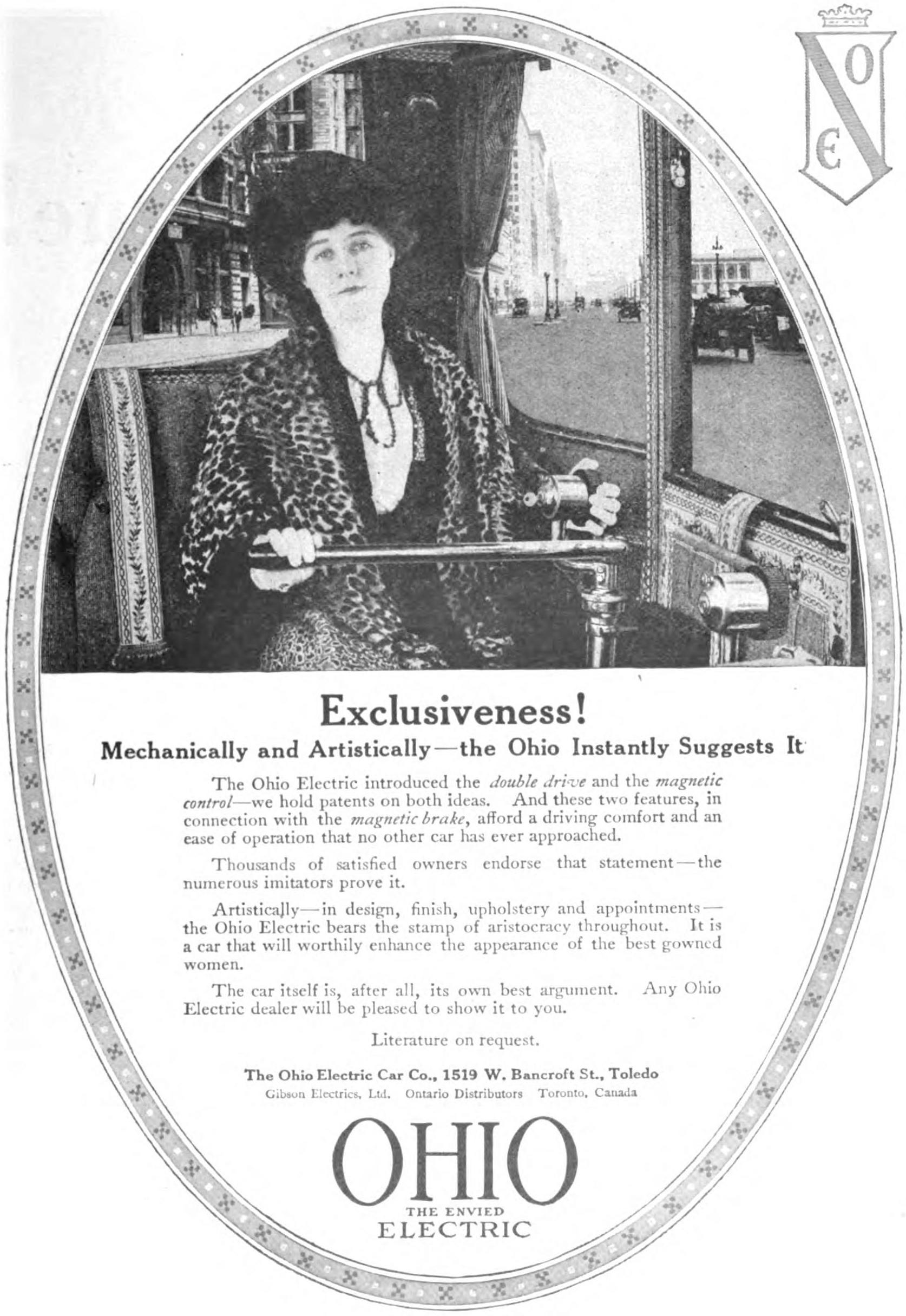
1913 Ohio Electric advertisement showcasing a woman steering the car with the lever.

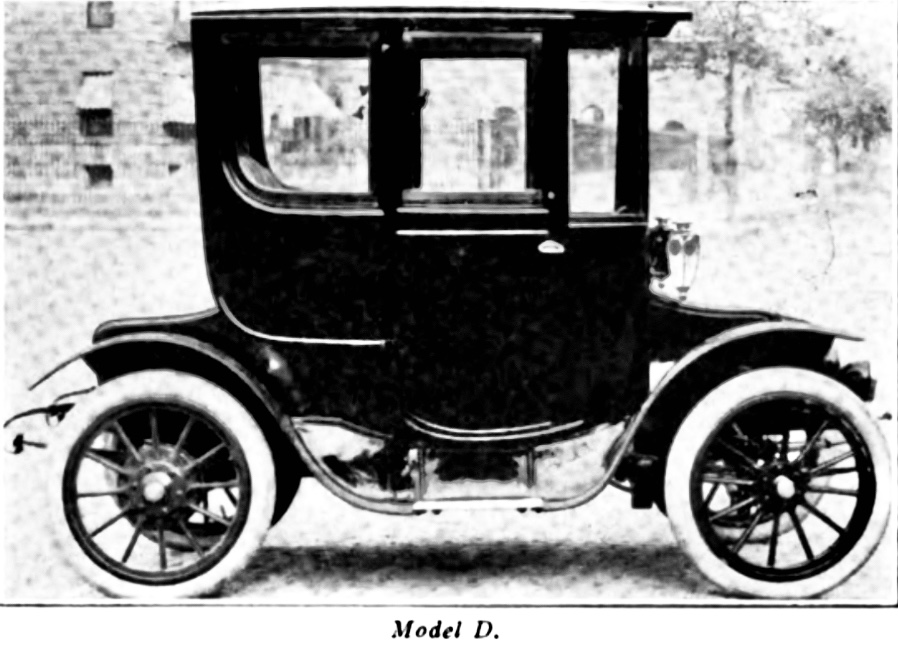
Ohio Electric Model D (1911-1912)

Ohio Electric offered only electric cars, emphasising in the ads (often aimed at women) how they were particularly easy to drive. Their cars were steered with a steering lever that could be operated from both the front seat and the back seat. Ohio Electric also emphasised their patents on the double drive and magnetic control, as well as their usage of the magnetic brake. The electric motors came from Crocker-Wheeler.

In 1910 there was only one model called the Shaft Drive. This is the only indication of cardan drive in Ohio Electric, otherwise chain drive is not mentioned for any model.

== Model overview ==
Year	Model	Wheelbase (cm)	Car body style
1910	Shaft Drive		Coupé
1911	Model D	203	Coupé
1911	Model F	203	Victoria
1911	Model G	203	Large Coupé
1912	Model D	203	Coupé
1912	Model F	229	Victoria
1912	Model G	229	Coupé
1912	Model K	229	Coupé
1912	Model Q	229	Victoria
1912	Model X	259	De Luxe Coupé
1913	Model F		Stanhope
1913	Model L	269	Colonial Brougham
1913	Model M	269	Straight-Line Brougham
1913	Model O	269	Dresden Brougham
1913	Model Q	229	Victoria
1913	Model Y	269	Brougham
1914	Model 40	249	Dresden Design with 4 seats
1914	Model 50	249	Coupé
1914	Model 60	249	Viennese Design with 5 seats
1915	Model 11 Single-Drive	250	Coupé
1915	Model 21	250	Roadster
1915	Model 41	250	Brougham
1915	Model 51 Double-Drive	250	Brougham
1915	Model 61 Double-Drive	250	Coupé
1915	Roadster	250	Roadster with 2 seats
1915	Single-Drive	250	Brougham with 4 and 5 seats
1915	Double-Drive	250	Brougham with 5 seats
1916	Model 12	239	Brougham with 4 seats
1916	Model 42 Single-Drive	262	Brougham
1916	Model 62	262	Brougham with 5 seats
1916	Roadster	262	Roadster
1916	Single-Drive	262	Coupé
1917	Model 12	262	Coupé
1917	Model 43	262	Brougham
1917	Model 63	262	Brougham
1917	Coach	262	Coach
1917	Single-Drive	262	Roadster
1918	Brougham	262	Brougham
1918	Coach	262	Coach

== Bibliography ==
- Kimes, Beverly Rae (1996). Standard catalog of American cars, 1805-1942 (3rd ed.). Iola, WI: Krause Publications. pp. 1056–1058. ISBN 0-87341-428-4. OCLC 34905743.
- The Beaulieu encyclopedia of the automobile. G. N. Georgano. Chicago: Fitzroy Dearborn Publishers. 2000. pp. 1135–1136. ISBN 1-57958-293-1. OCLC 45369199.
