= Kuppenheimer =

Men's clothing manufacturer and retailer

B. Kuppenheimer & Co.
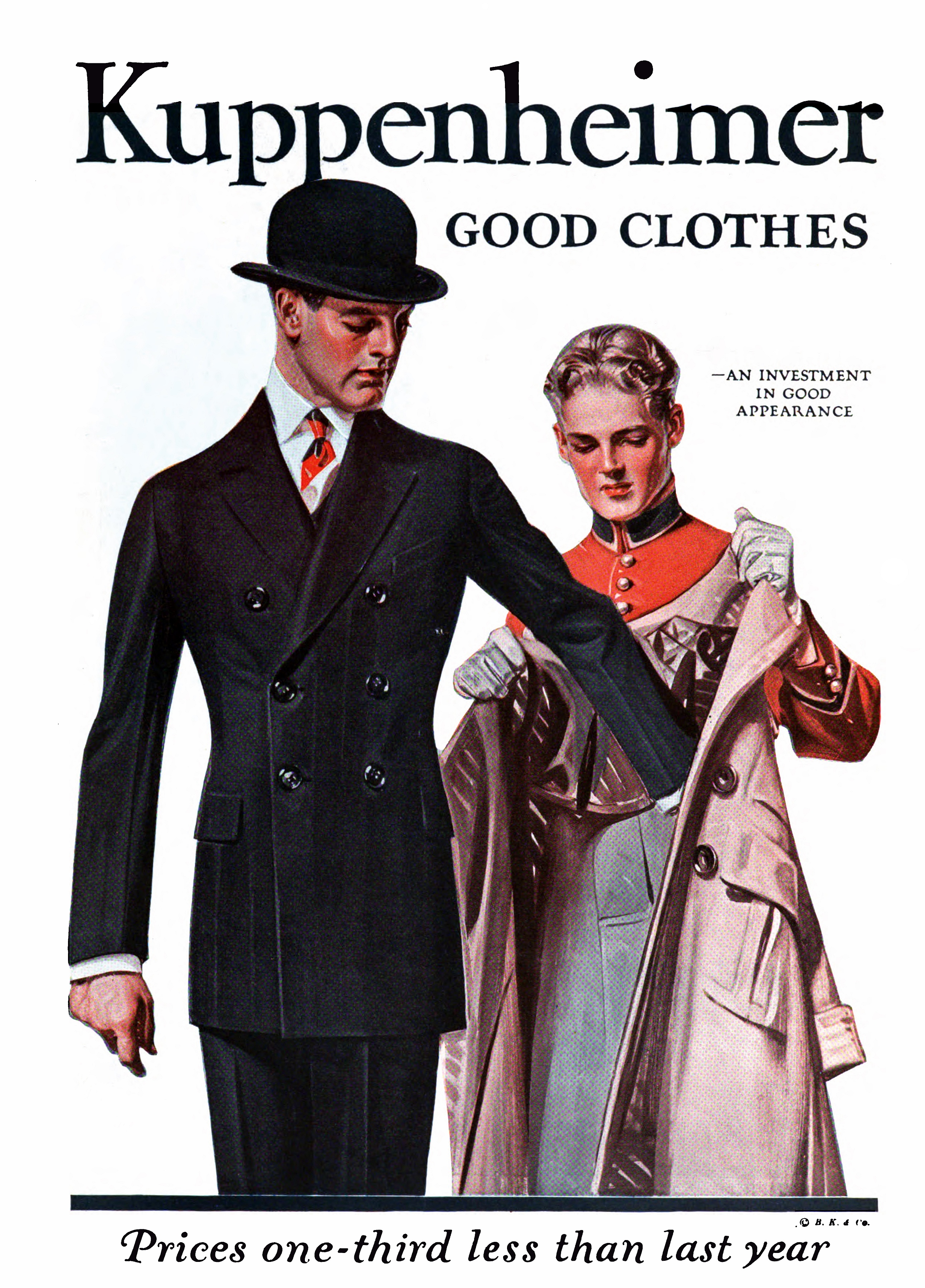
- 1921 advertisement
- Industry: Clothing manufacturer & Retail
- Founded: 1852
- Defunct: 1997
- Fate: Purchased in 1997 by Men's Wearhouse. The remaining stores were closed and the remaining assets were liquidated.
- Headquarters: Terre Haute, Indiana; Chicago, Illinois; Atlanta, Georgia
- Key people: Bernard Kuppenheimer (founder)
- Products: Fashion apparel
- Parent: Hartmarx; Men's Wearhouse

B. Kuppenheimer & Co., or simply Kuppenheimer, was a men's clothing manufacturing and retail operation based in Chicago, Illinois and later Atlanta, Georgia.

== History ==
=== Kohn, Clayburgh & Einstein ===
In 1852, Bernard Kuppenheimer, who immigrated to America in 1850, founded a retail clothing store in Terre Haute, Indiana. In 1863, Julius Kohn, Martin Clayburgh, and Morris Einstein founded Kohn, Clayburgh & Einstein at 27 Lake Street in Chicago. Only two years later, in 1865, Kohn retired and Bernard Kuppenheimer, who relocated to Chicago leaving the Terre Haute store under the supervision of his brother John, and David Lindauer became members. Clayburgh, Einstein, Kuppenheimer, and Lindauer continued to operate the company without changing the name. They operated out of the Lake Street location until the Great Chicago Fire of 1871, when their building was burnt to the ground and they suffered losses totaling $200,000 (equivalent to $5,375,000 in 2025). After rebuilding, they resumed business and in July 1872, moved to the corner of Randolph Street and Wabash Avenue where they remained until the fall of 1876.

=== B. Kuppenheimer & Co. ===
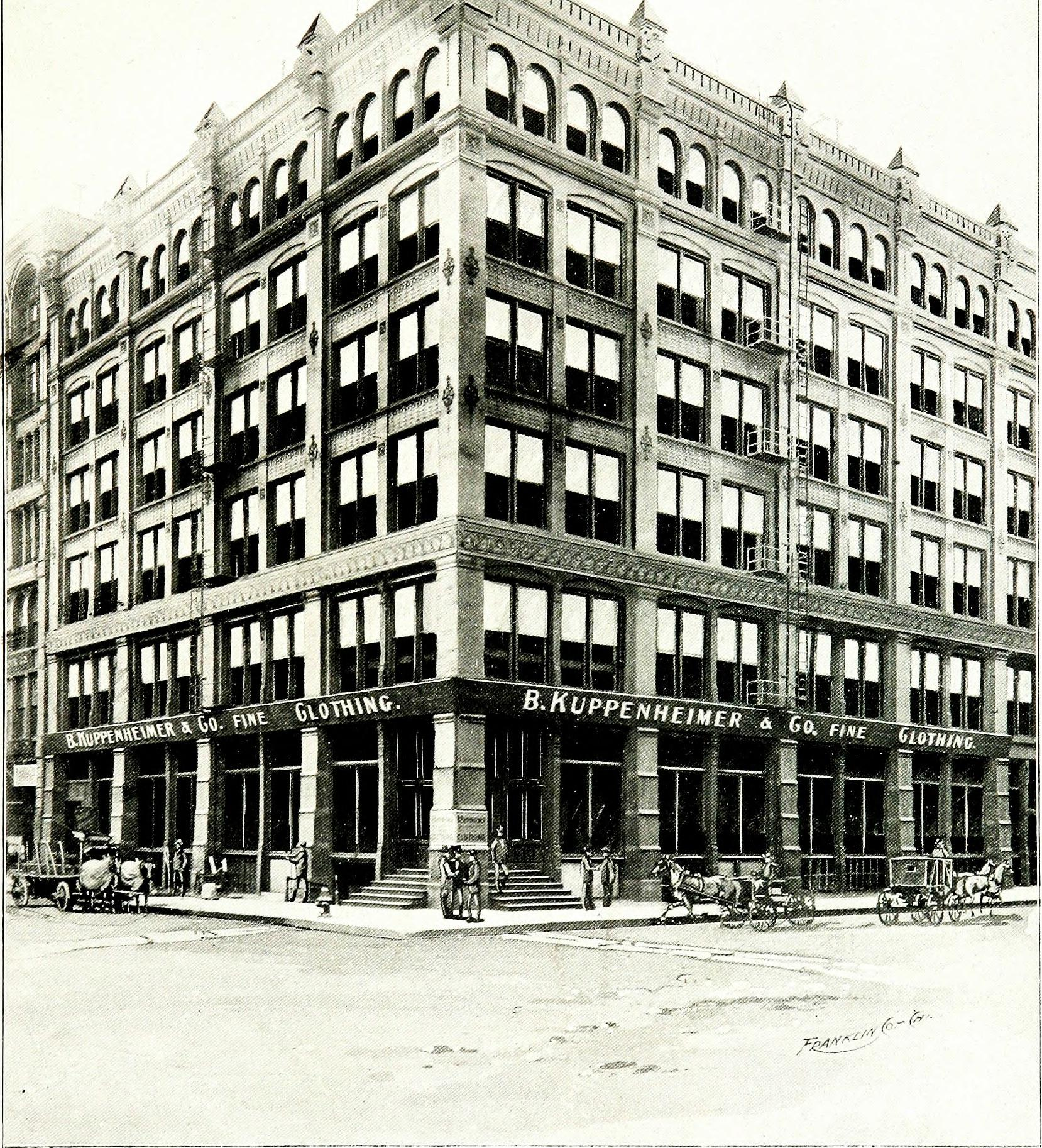
Kuppenheimer store in Chicago in 1900

In 1876, the business was dissolved and Kuppenheimer formed B. Kuppenheimer & Co. The new company was composed of him, his son Jonas Kuppenheimer, and Samuel Nathan. The remaining members of the Kohn, Claybugh & Einstein reorganized as Einstein, Longini & Co. B. Kuppenheimer & Co. started in business on Wabash Avenue and stayed there until 1880.

In January 1880, Kuppenheimer & Co. moved to Madison Street and Louis B. Kuppenheimer, the second son of Bernard Kuppenheimer, was admitted as a partner. As of 1884, Kuppenheimer & Co had annual sales of nearly $1,000,000 (equivalent to $35,833,000 in 2025). In 1903, Kuppenheimer died and was buried at Rosehill Cemetery and Mausoleum in Chicago.

In 1906, the company operated "The House of Kuppenheimer" branches in Boston and New York, with sales in Washington, D.C. handled by Isidor Grosner of 1013 Pennsylvania Ave., NW. During the World War I, Kuppenheimer manufactured the uniforms for the U.S. Army. By 1910, the company employed close to 2,000 men and women at shops in and around Chicago.

In 1912, Louis became vice-president of the company. In 1920, Albert Kuppenheimer retired from the company. He died in California in 1931 at the age of 64 although his residence in Chicago was the Drake Hotel. Later in 1920, Louis Kuppenheimer became president of B. Kuppenheimer & Co.

In 1921, Jonas Kuppenheimer, who had been serving as president of "The House of Kuppenheimer," died. In 1926, Louis Kuppenheimer retired as president of the company. In 1936, Louis, the last living son of founder Bernard Kuppenheimer, died.

In 1959, Lester E. Frankenstein succeeded Bertram J. Cahn to become president of the company. Frankenstein was previously the vice-president.

=== Sale and closure ===
In March 1963, the firm was purchased by Louis Roth & Co., Inc. of Los Angeles for $3 million (equivalent to $31,549,000 in 2025). The firm continued as a leading manufacturer of men's clothing until 1982, when it was purchased by Hart Schaffner & Marx (later known as Hartmarx), a Chicago-based apparel-maker and wholesaler. By the mid-1990s, after the headquarters moved to Atlanta, sales were lagging, many of its stores were closing, and it entered into bankruptcy.

In 1995, Hartmarx sold Kuppenheimer to Kupp Acquisition Corp. for $14 million (equivalent to $29,581,000 in 2025) in cash ($12 million upfront and an additional $2 million over the next four years) and a $2.5 million promissory note secured by one of Kuppenheimer's manufacturing facilities. Kupp was formed by an investment group led by Gene Kosack, former president and chief executive of NBO Stores Inc., a clothing retailer.

In 1997, The Men's Wearhouse purchased Kuppenheimer Manufacturing Co. from Kupp Acquisition Corp. At that time, Kuppenheimer consisted of 43 men's clothing stores, mostly in the Chicago, St. Louis and Atlanta areas and the manufacturing facilities. The sale included the rights to Kuppenheimer's trademark and customer list. Men's Wearhouse closed the remaining Kuppenheimer stores and folded the business into its own by liquidating the remaining assets.

== In popular culture ==
- In the 1960s, Kuppenheimer was the supplier of Rod Serling's wardrobe on his television series, The Twilight Zone.
- Kuppenheimer is known for commissioning American illustrator J.C. Leyendecker to create hundreds of paintings to be used in their advertisements.
- In the Netflix show Jupiter's Legacy that premiered in 2021 in Season 1 Episode 2, Sheldon Sampson brings a Kuppenheimer suit to dress his father at the father's funeral.
- In the 1960s, the company provided Lawrence Welk’s wardrobe and can thus be seen in the credits of some episodes of The Lawrence Welk Show.

== Gallery ==
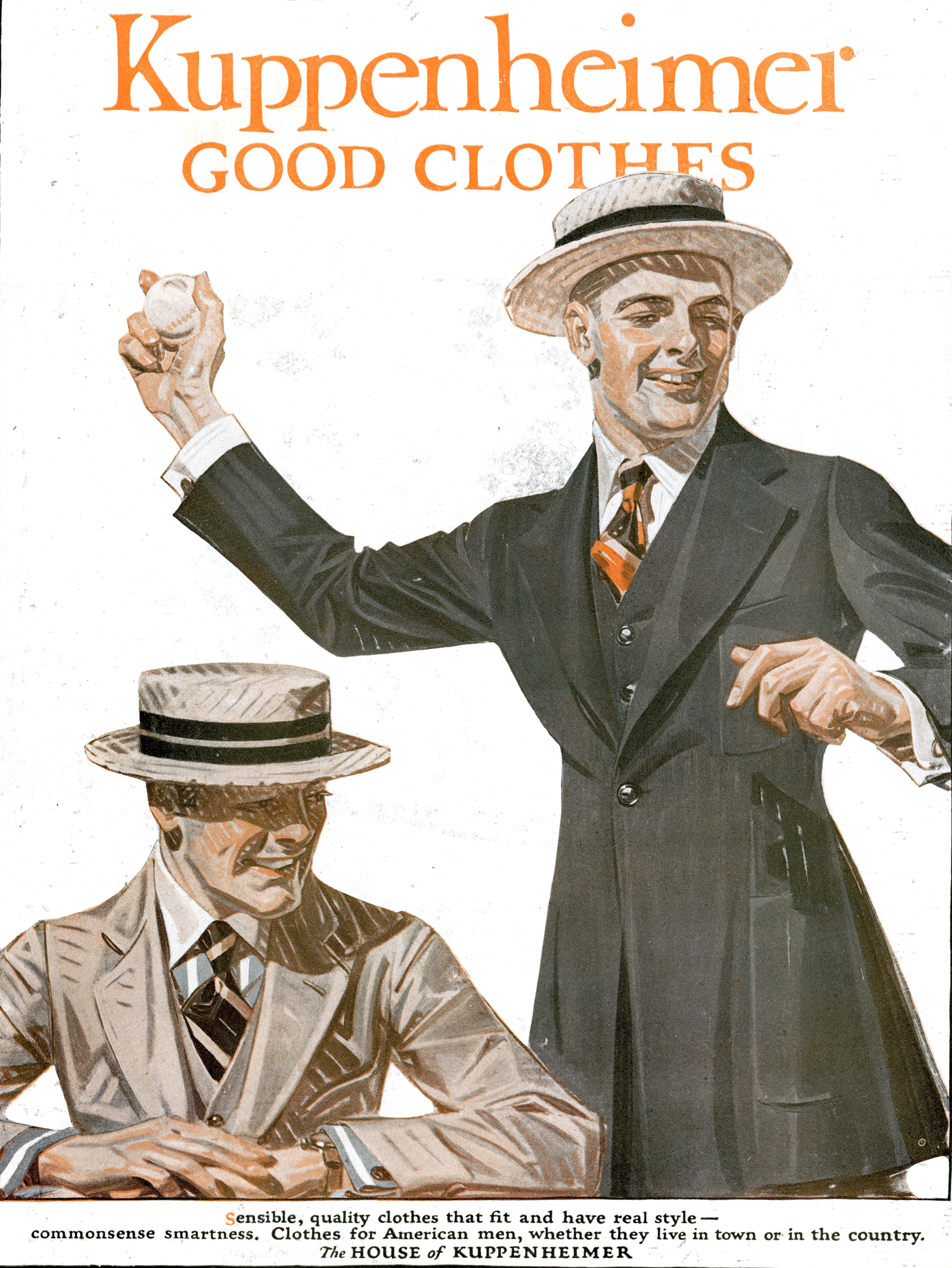
Ad from Country Gentleman in 1920

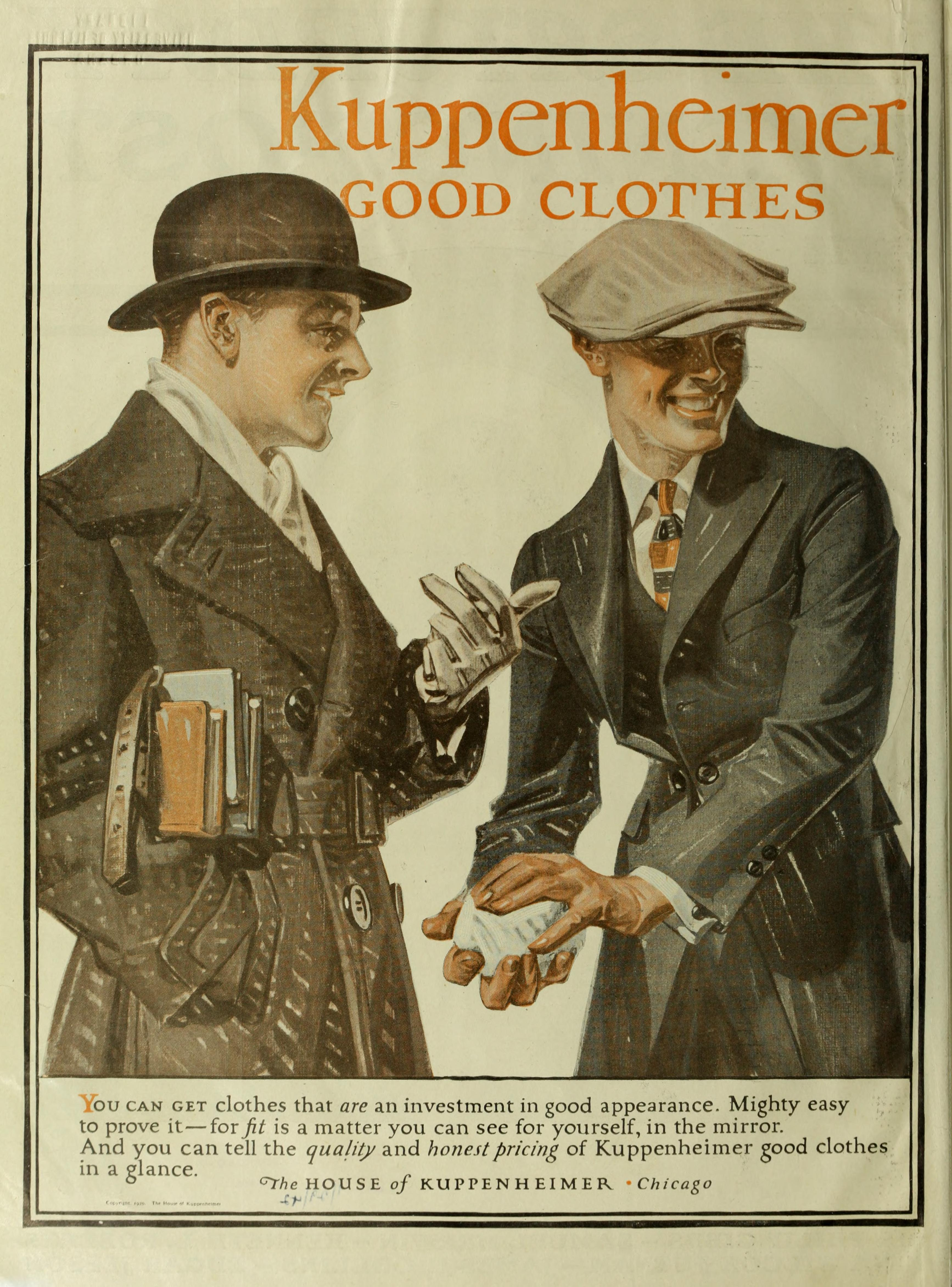
Ad from Saturday Evening Post in 1920

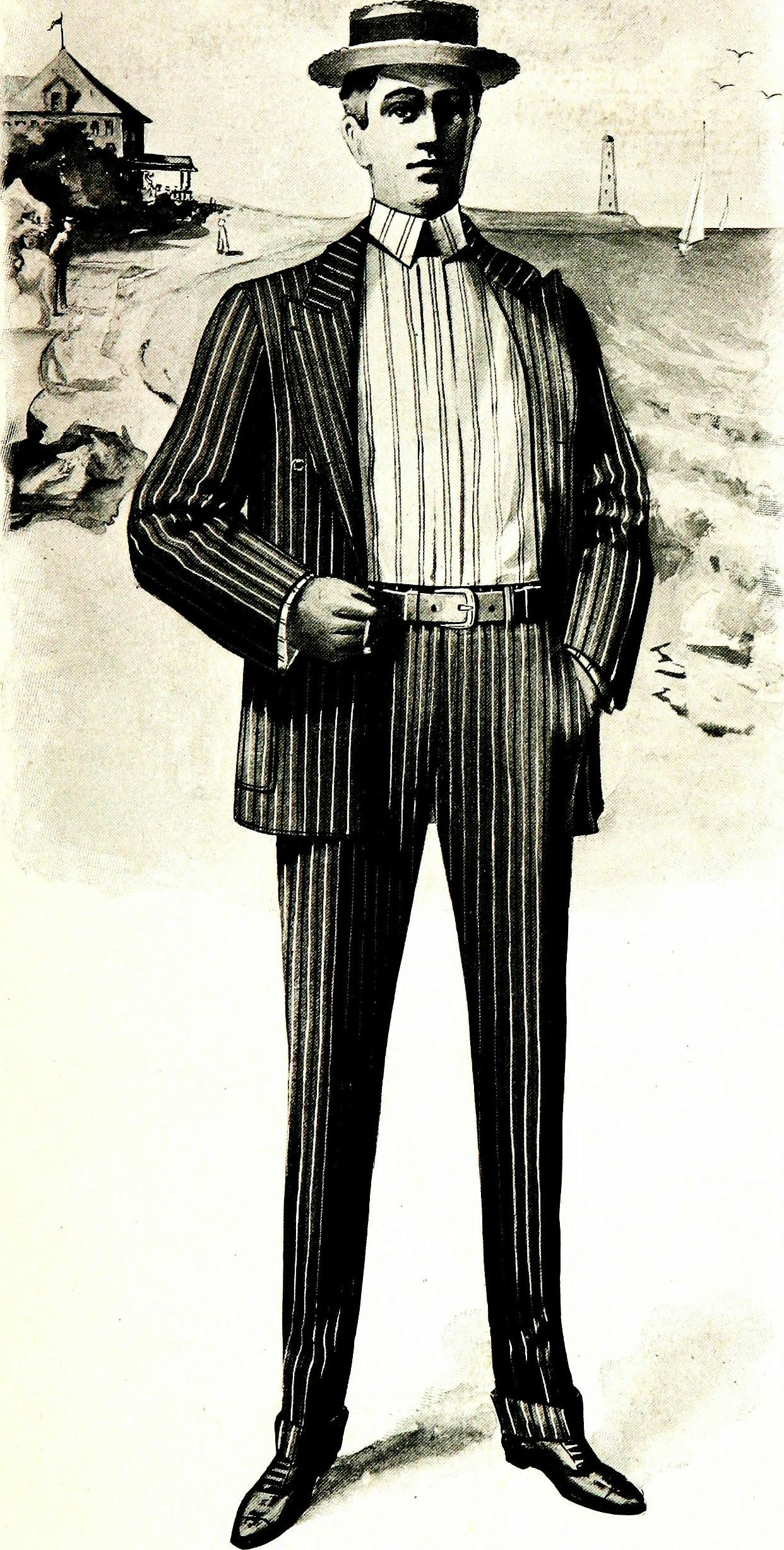
Ad from 1900

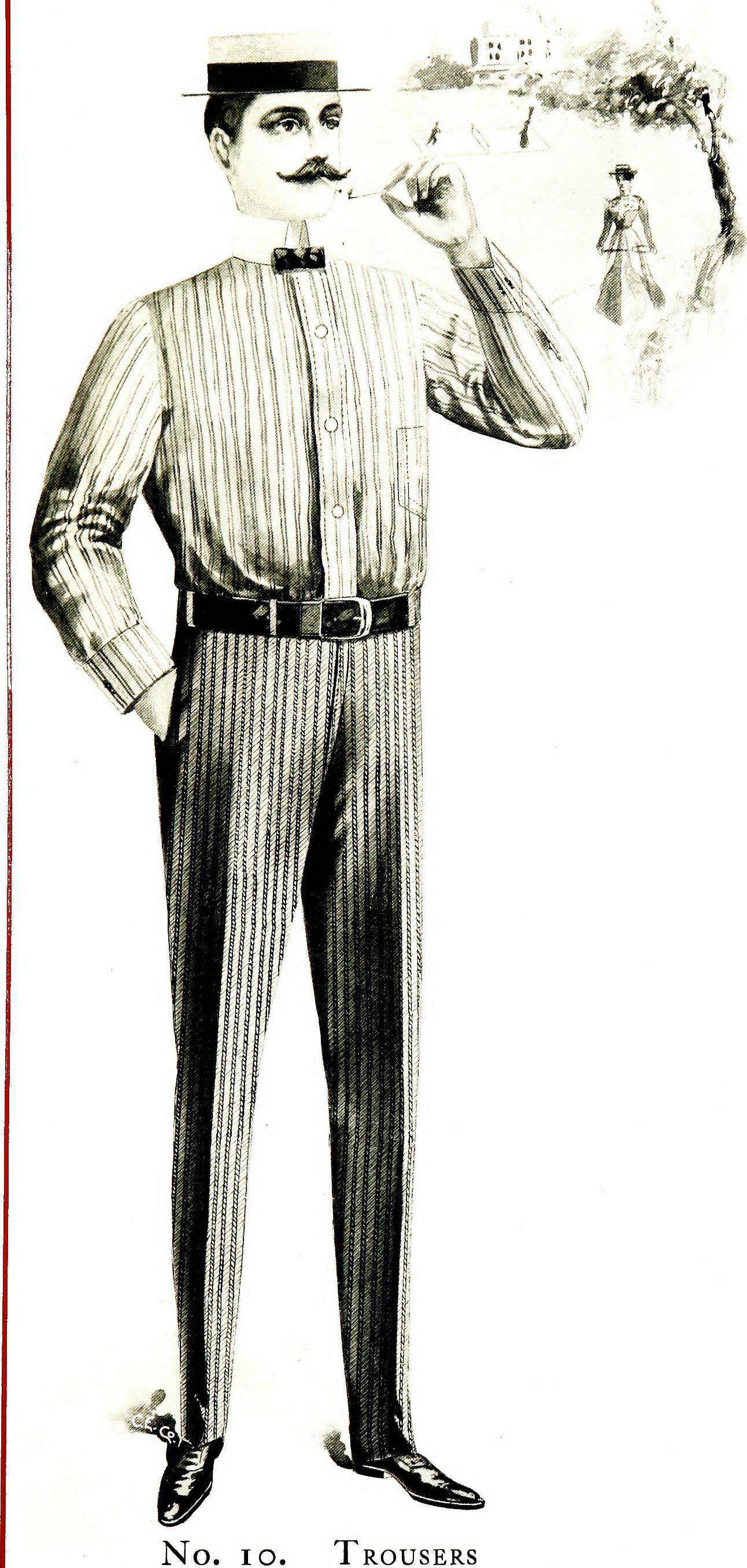
Ad from 1900

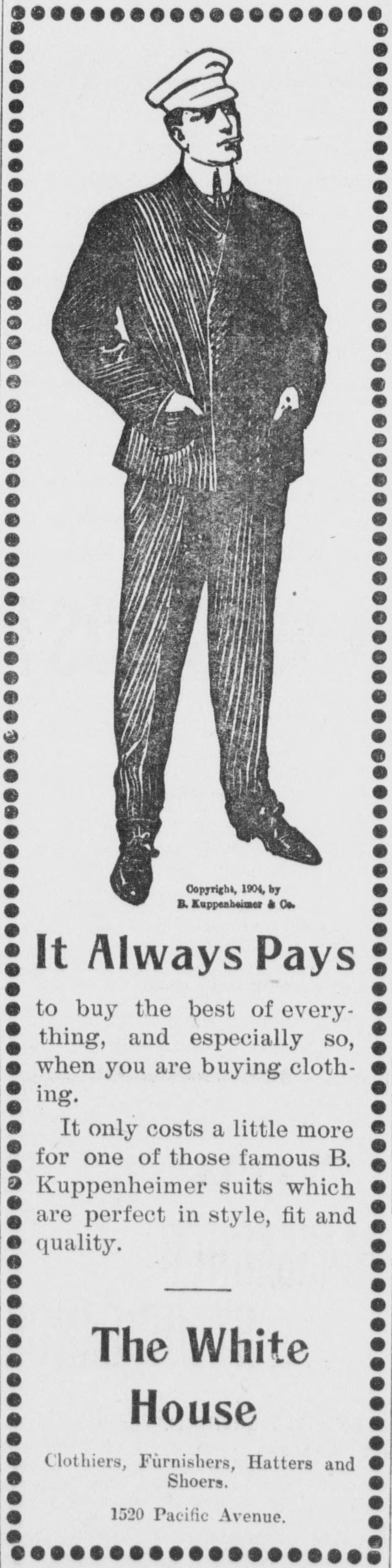
Ad from 1904

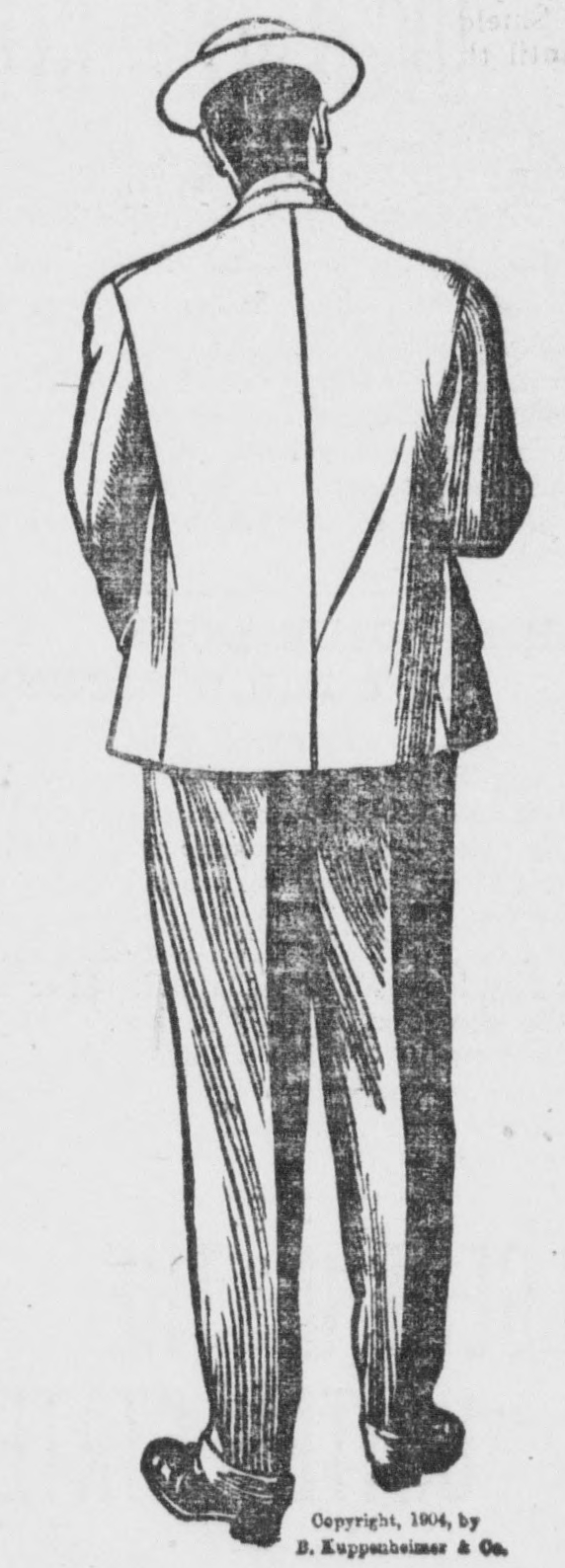
Ad from 1904

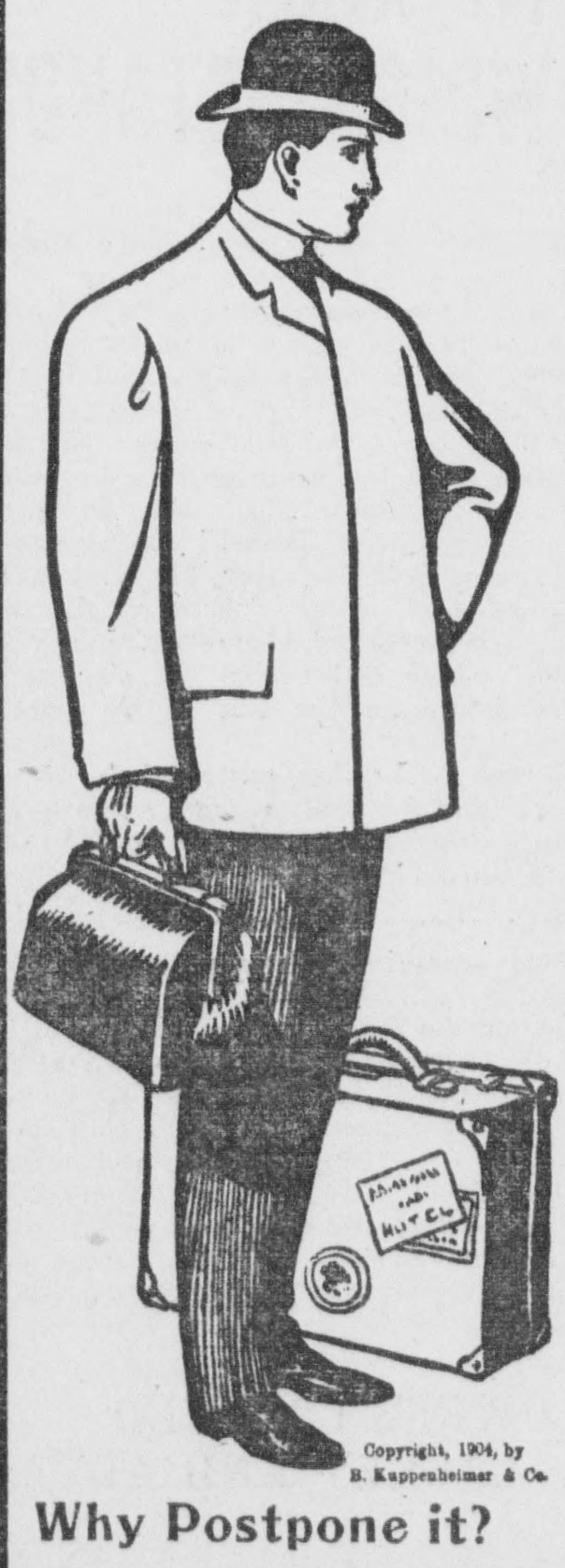
Ad from 1904

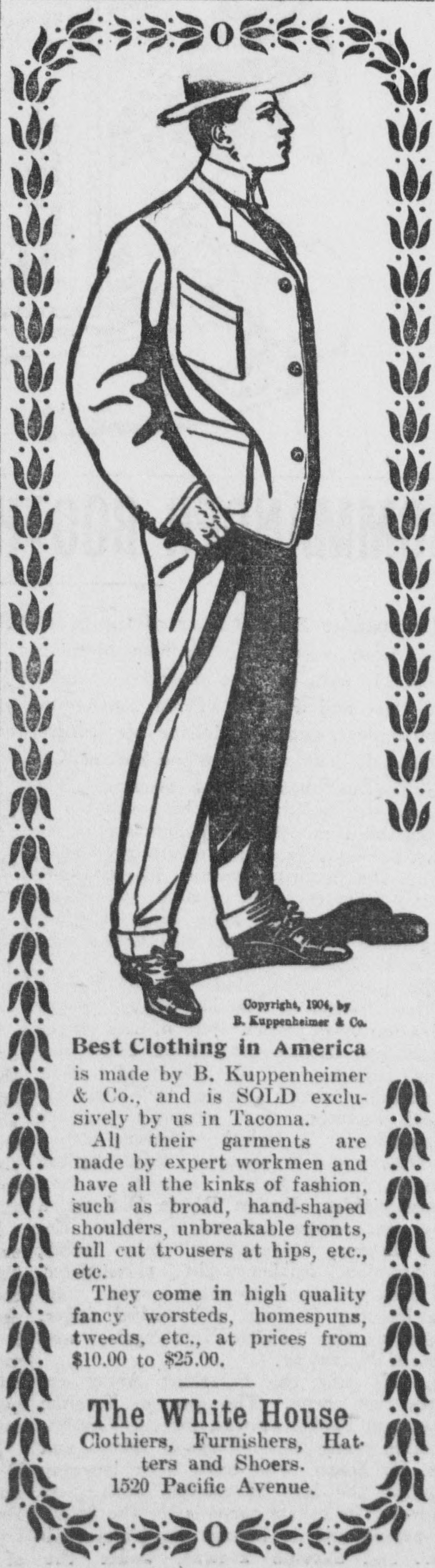
Ad from 1904

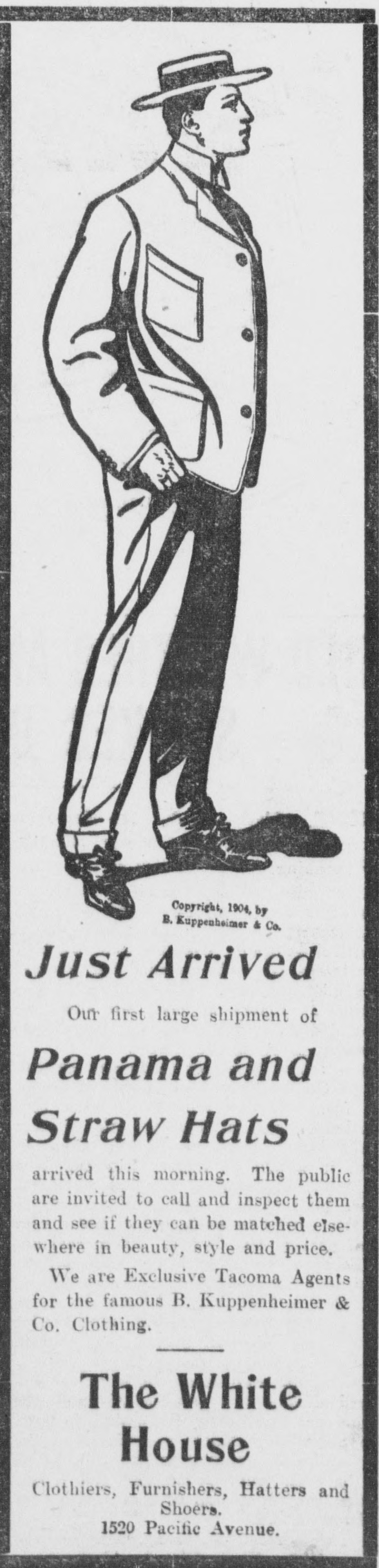
Ad from 1904

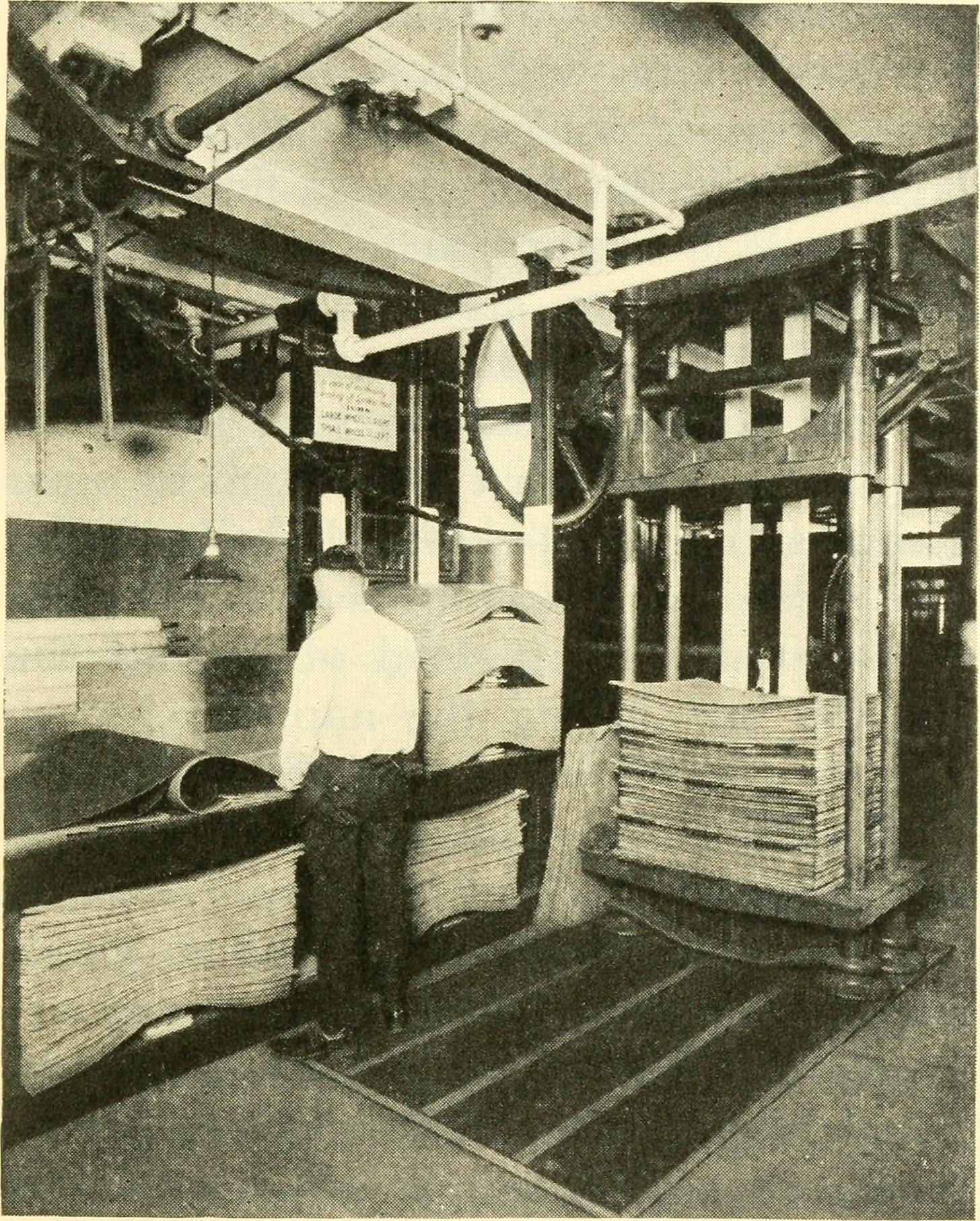
Manufacturing facility in 1921
