= Eddie Bauer =

American retail company

Eddie Bauer LLC

- A retail store in Chattanooga, Tennessee
- Type: Subsidiary
- Industry: Retail
- Founded: 1920 (106 years ago) in Seattle, Washington, U.S.
- Founder: Eddie Bauer
- Defunct: April 30, 2026; 5 months ago (North American retail stores only)
- Fate: Chapter 11 bankruptcy; Liquidation; (retail stores)
- Number of locations: 200 before closure
- Area served: United States; Canada; Germany; Japan
- Products: Clothing, sportswear, outdoor gear
- Revenue: US $500 million (2025)
- Number of employees: 7,000 worldwide (2021)
- Parent: General Mills (1971-1988); Spiegel (1988-2005); Golden Gate Capital (2009-2021); SPARC Group (2021-2025); Catalyst Brands (2025-2026); O5 Group (2026-present)
- Website: www.eddiebauer.com

Eddie Bauer LLC is an American outdoor recreation brand headquartered in New York City. Eddie Bauer sells its merchandise online. The company also licenses the Eddie Bauer brand name and logo for various products sold through other companies including eyewear, furniture, bicycles, and, until the 2010 model year, upper level versions of the Ford Motor Company's Bronco, Explorer, Expedition and Excursion SUVs.

The company was established in 1920 in Seattle by Pacific Northwest outdoorsman Eddie Bauer (1899–1986). In 1940, Bauer patented the first quilted down jacket. Bauer retired and sold the company to his partner in 1968. General Mills bought the company in 1971 and Spiegel acquired it from General Mills in 1988. In 2003, Spiegel filed for bankruptcy and in May 2005, it emerged from bankruptcy under the name "Eddie Bauer Holdings, Inc.". On June 17, 2009, Eddie Bauer filed for bankruptcy and was acquired by Golden Gate Capital the following month. In 2021, it was acquired by Authentic Brands Group and SPARC Group LLC.

On February 9, 2026, Eddie Bauer LLC filed for Chapter 11 bankruptcy protection and announced that all of its stores in North America would close their doors.

== History ==
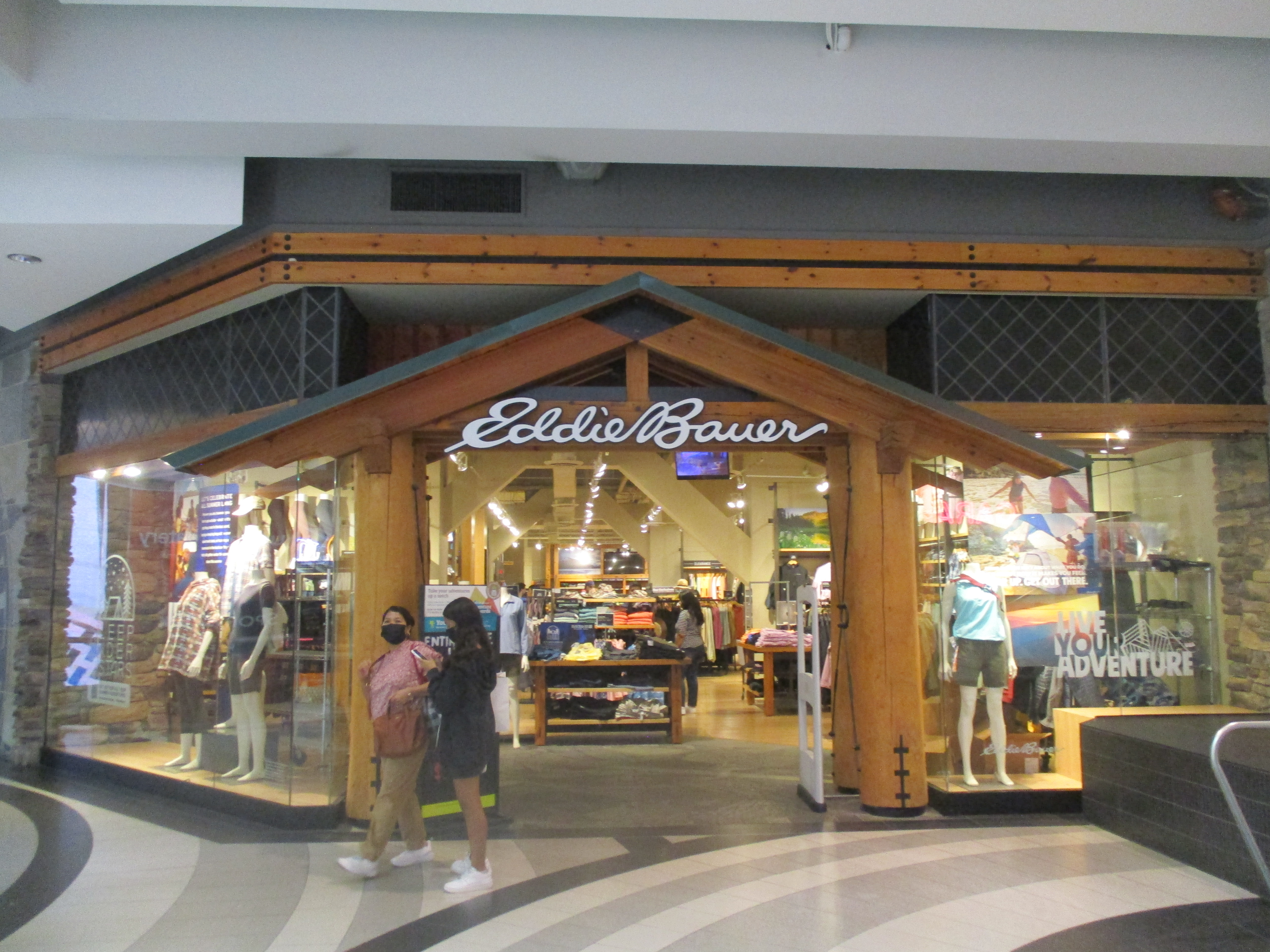
Eddie Bauer in Toronto

=== 1920–1949: Eddie Bauer's Sport Shop ===
In 1920, at the age of 21, Eddie Bauer established his first store in downtown Seattle, "Eddie Bauer's Tennis Shop", in the back of a local hunting and fishing store. He first specialized in building and repairing tennis rackets and the shop was only open during the tennis season; Bauer spent the rest of the year pursuing his own sportsman activities. Bauer expanded his line of merchandise to include his own hand-made golf clubs and fishing tackle and he changed the name of his store to "Eddie Bauer's Sport Shop". Bauer developed and patented a standardized shuttlecock in 1934. The Bauer Shuttlecock popularized badminton in the United States. While operating this first store, Bauer developed his creed, "To give you such outstanding quality, value, service and guarantee that we may be worthy of your high esteem", still used by the modern company.In 1929, Bauer married Christine "Stine" Heltborg, an accomplished sportswoman who became his chief field tester and whom he affectionately called "my wilderness companion."

==== The Skyliner ====
While on a winter fishing trip in Washington, Eddie Bauer developed hypothermia. He then began trying to develop alternatives to heavy wool garments used by outdoorsmen at the time. He attempted to offset the bulkiness of down by quilting a down jacket. In 1940, Bauer patented the first quilted goose down-insulated jacket in the United States: and introduced it in his store as "The Skyliner". Bauer received over 20 patents on various outdoor clothing and sporting equipment between 1934 and 1937. Bauer originally called his prototype the "Blizzard-Proof Jacket" and enlisted Seattle mountaineer Ome Daiber, who had his own small manufacturing operation, to produce the first generation of the design before Bauer refined it further. Under the patent, Bauer held exclusive rights to the jacket's diamond-quilt design for 14 years, and he later expanded this to ten additional design patents for quilted clothing, making Eddie Bauer the sole domestic manufacturer of quilted down jackets until the 1960s.

==== U.S. Army Air Corps commission ====
In 1942, the United States Army Air Corps commissioned Eddie Bauer to develop the B-9 Flight Parka. More than 50,000 parkas were manufactured for airmen during World War II. The parka was designed to keep pilots warm at high altitudes. Of all government suppliers, only Eddie Bauer was granted permission to affix his company logo to his products used by the United States Army. In addition to the parkas, Eddie Bauer supplied the army with backpacks, pants and sleeping bags, all of which became standard issue for American troops in the war. Prior to his involvement, the United States Army had a shortage in sleeping bags; Bauer eventually sold over 100,000 sleeping bags to the United States Army.

==== Mail-order catalog ====
In 1945, soon after he began selling women's clothing as well as men's, Eddie Bauer issued his first mail order catalog. The original mailing list included the names of 14,000 soldiers who had worn Eddie Bauer clothing provided by the United States Army during their service. By 1949, Bauer employed 125 seamstresses. He closed his downtown store and got out of retailing, except for showroom sales at his Seattle factory.

=== 1950–1959: William F. Niemi partnership ===
By 1950, Eddie Bauer's health was declining due to overwork and a serious back injury. Bauer transferred all of the common stock in Eddie Bauer, Inc., to his hunting partner, William F. Niemi, who reorganized the store and improved cash flow.

By 1953, catalog sales totaled US$50,000. At this point, Bauer returned to being a shareholder in the company and formed a 50-50 partnership with Niemi. During the 1950s, the company supplied outwear for many scientific and exploratory expeditions.

In 1960, Eddie Bauer and William Niemi took on their sons, Eddie C. Bauer and William Niemi Jr. as partners in the company.

The company supplied equipment for the American K2 Himalayan Expedition and several journeys through Antarctica. In 1963, despite being an employee of REI, Jim Whittaker, the first American to climb Mount Everest, wore an Eddie Bauer parka and other company products during his expedition.

==== Retirement of Eddie Bauer ====
In 1968, Eddie Bauer retired, and he and his son sold their half of the business to William Niemi, his son, and their investors for $1.5 million. That same year the first store outside of Seattle opened, in San Francisco.

In 1970, the company's first large store opened in downtown Seattle. In order to appeal to a broader range of consumers, Niemi shifted the company's focus featuring casual lifestyle apparel. The emphasis on women's apparel and accessories was also greatly expanded in all stores.

=== 1971–1987: General Mills and Ford Eddie Bauer branding ===
In 1971, William Niemi sold the company to General Mills. After the sale, the company shifted its focus to casual clothing and expanded to 61 stores and made $250 million in sales by 1988. This shift included the company dropping the tagline "Expedition Outfitter."

In 1987, Eddie Bauer introduced the "All Week Long" concept. This was meant to provide women with clothing they could wear throughout the week, including at work, as opposed to just weekend wear. This concept was sold solely through the catalog until the first All Week Long store opened in Portland, Oregon in the summer of 1991.

In 1983, Eddie Bauer began a cross-branding partnership with Ford Motor Company to produce Eddie Bauer Edition Ford vehicles. In 1984, the first Eddie Bauer Edition Ford debuted: the limited edition "Eddie Bauer Bronco." The partnership ended in 2010, with the 2010 Explorer and Expedition the last two models available in Eddie Bauer edition.

The following Ford vehicles were available in Eddie Bauer editions:

- Ford Bronco (1984–1996)
- Ford Bronco II (1984–1990)
- Ford Explorer (1991–2010)
- Ford Expedition (1997–2010)
- Ford F-150 (1994–1996)
- Ford Excursion (2003–2005)
- Ford Taurus X (2008–2009)
- Ford Aerostar (1988–1994)

=== 1988–2009: Spiegel, Inc., and a standalone company ===
In 1988, Spiegel acquired Eddie Bauer from General Mills. Aggressive expansion continued and within the first year the company had expanded from 60 to 99 stores. By 1996, an additional 300 stores had been opened.

In 1991, Eddie Bauer launched Eddie Bauer Home, a collection of home furnishings, including furniture, tableware, decor items and linens. The collection was meant to appeal to the customers that purchased apparel from the company. The home store maintained a "warm and cozy" theme by presenting beds with thick blankets and floors covered with wool rugs.

In 1995, in partnership with American Forests, the company launched the "Add a Dollar, Plant a Tree" retail program in which it offered to plant a tree every time a customer donated a dollar.

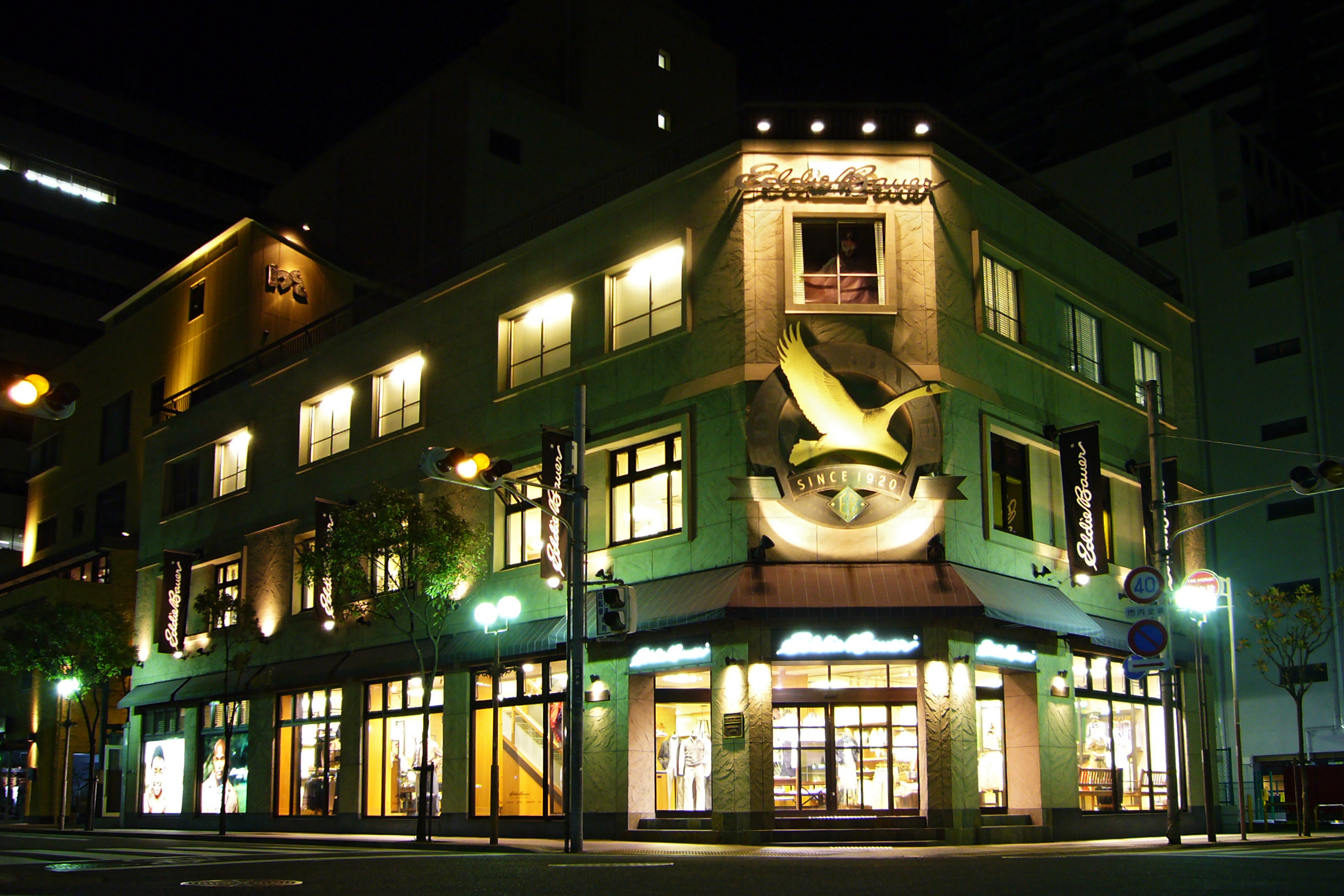
An Eddie Bauer store in Kobe, Hyōgo, Japan

In 1996, Eddie Bauer launched its website. The company launched the EBTEK product line, including outerwear and casual activewear made of Gore-Tex, Polartec 200, and Eddie Bauer Premium Goose Down. Eight new stores opened in Japan that year, bringing the total to 14 stores and three outlets. Eddie Bauer Germany also opened two new stores in Germany.

Eddie Bauer continued to expand in North America and internationally throughout 1997, opening the 500th U.S. store. Internationally, Eddie Bauer Japan opened 11 new stores, bringing the total to 24 stores in Japan, along with four outlet stores in various locations.

In 1997, Eddie Bauer Germany opened five new stores, bringing the total to seven Eddie Bauer stores in Germany. Eddie Bauer enters into a licensing agreement with the Lane Company, offering an exclusive collection of Eddie Bauer Home by Lane furniture.

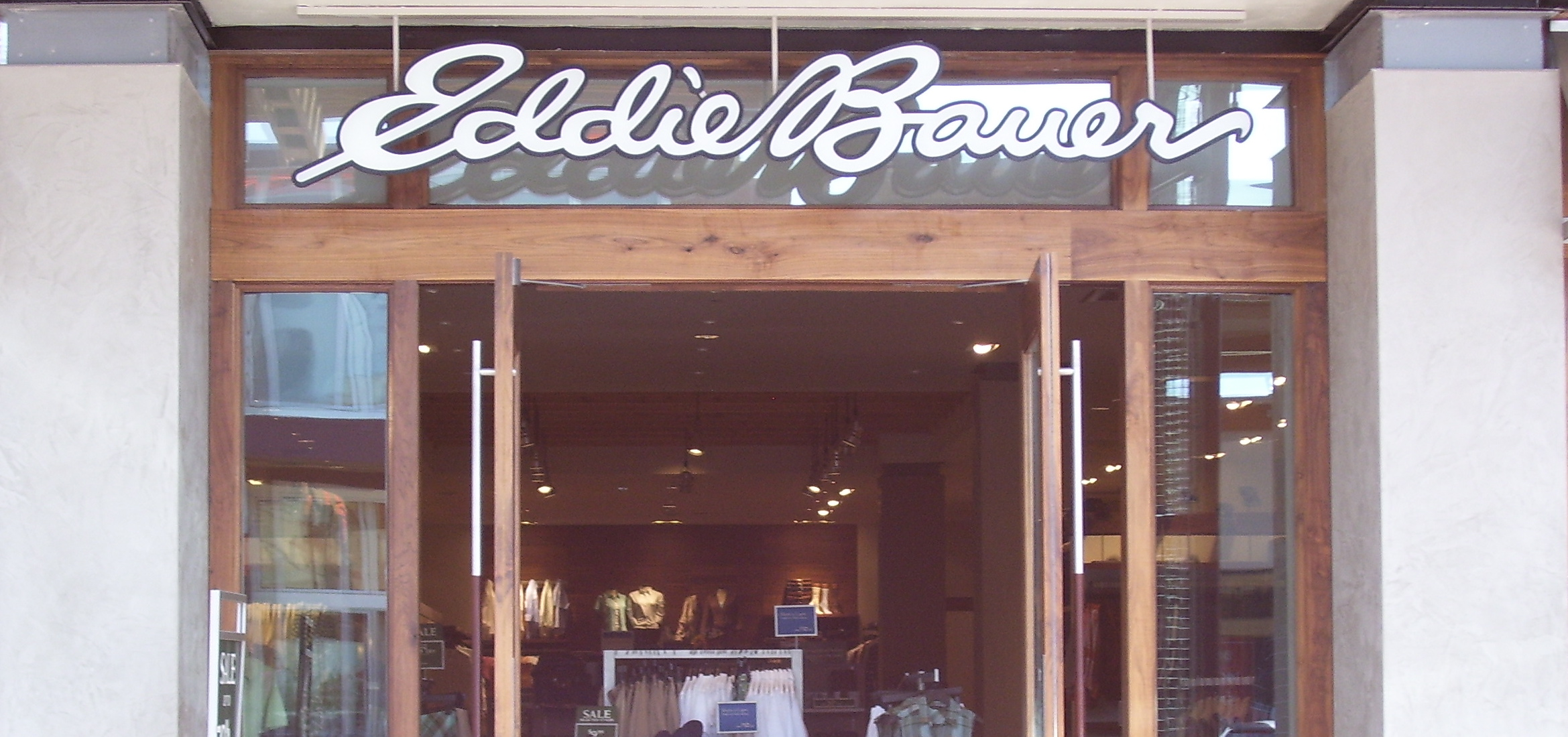
Eddie Bauer Apparel Store in Boulder, Colorado

In March 1998, Signature Eyewear launched Eddie Bauer performance sunwear featuring Oakley XYZ Optics.

By 1998, over 500 stores had been opened in North America (556), Japan (32), and Germany (9). Eddie Bauer entered into a three-year licensing agreement with Giant Bicycle, Inc., to launch a line of Eddie Bauer Edition mountain bikes for off-terrain and city riding. Eddie Bauer and Signature Eyewear joined to produce the Eddie Bauer Eyewear collection for men and women. Eddie Bauer and Cosco, Inc., joined to build upon Eddie Bauer's "Baby by Eddie Bauer" collection of Eddie Bauer Home merchandise for infants.

In April 1999, the company signed a two-year agreement to be the official apparel sponsor of event staff at Safeco Field, the new home of the Seattle Mariners, through the 2000 Major League Baseball season.

Also in 1999, the one-millionth Eddie Bauer Edition Ford rolled off the assembly line.

National Geographic Ventures joined forces with Eddie Bauer to include the corporate sponsorship of a new giant screen film on the Lewis and Clark Expedition. Other elements included a multi-tiered travel alliance and Eddie Bauer sponsorships of Radio Expeditions (a National Geographic and National Public Radio co-production) and the National Geography Bee.

In March 2000, Eddie Bauer opened a store in Honolulu, Hawaii, completing Eddie Bauer's entry into all 50 American states.

In April 2000, Eddie Bauer joined forces with American Forests to launch the Wildfire ReLeaf program, established to help in the restoration of land decimated by forest fires in 2000.

In October 2000, Eddie Bauer launched its first exclusively on-line business venture, eddiebauerkids.com.

In January 2001, Eddie Bauer teamed with American Recreation Products through a licensing agreement to launch a collection of camping equipment to be sold by Target Corporation.

==== Bankruptcies and reorganization ====
In March 2003, Spiegel filed for bankruptcy. It sold its flagship catalog business and its Newport News women's apparel unit and announced that Eddie Bauer Inc. was up for auction. More than 200 Eddie Bauer stores were closed. The company's corporate headquarters, in Redmond, Washington, was sold to Microsoft for $38 million.

Despite interest from companies including L.L. Bean, Bain Capital, and Cerberus Capital Management, Spiegel pulled Eddie Bauer from auction due to lack of a satisfactory offer. Spiegel then reorganized around the Eddie Bauer business with Eddie Bauer emerging as a standalone company owned partially by Fidelity Investments (11%), Bank of America (6.9%), and J.P. Morgan Chase (6.2%). In May 2006, the company hired Goldman Sachs to explore a possible future sale.

In 2009, the company launched a new line of clothing called FirstAscent that underwent testing under extreme conditions first on Mount Rainier, then on Cotopaxi in Ecuador and finally on Aconcagua in Argentina.

On June 17, 2009, Eddie Bauer filed for Chapter 11 bankruptcy protection. The company was acquired at bankruptcy auction by Golden Gate Capital in July 2009 with a winning bid of $286 million.

=== 2010–2021: Private equity ownership ===
In October 2010, the company partnered with Airstream to launch a special-edition caravan.

In June 2012, Damien Huang was named President and CEO of the company.

In May 2013, Eddie Bauer joined Disney, Nike, Patagonia, Quiksilver, and Todd Oldham to be the first apparel brands to join the Otis Sustainability Alliance, a partnership between the fashion industry and higher education that aims to advance environmental, social and economic sustainability.

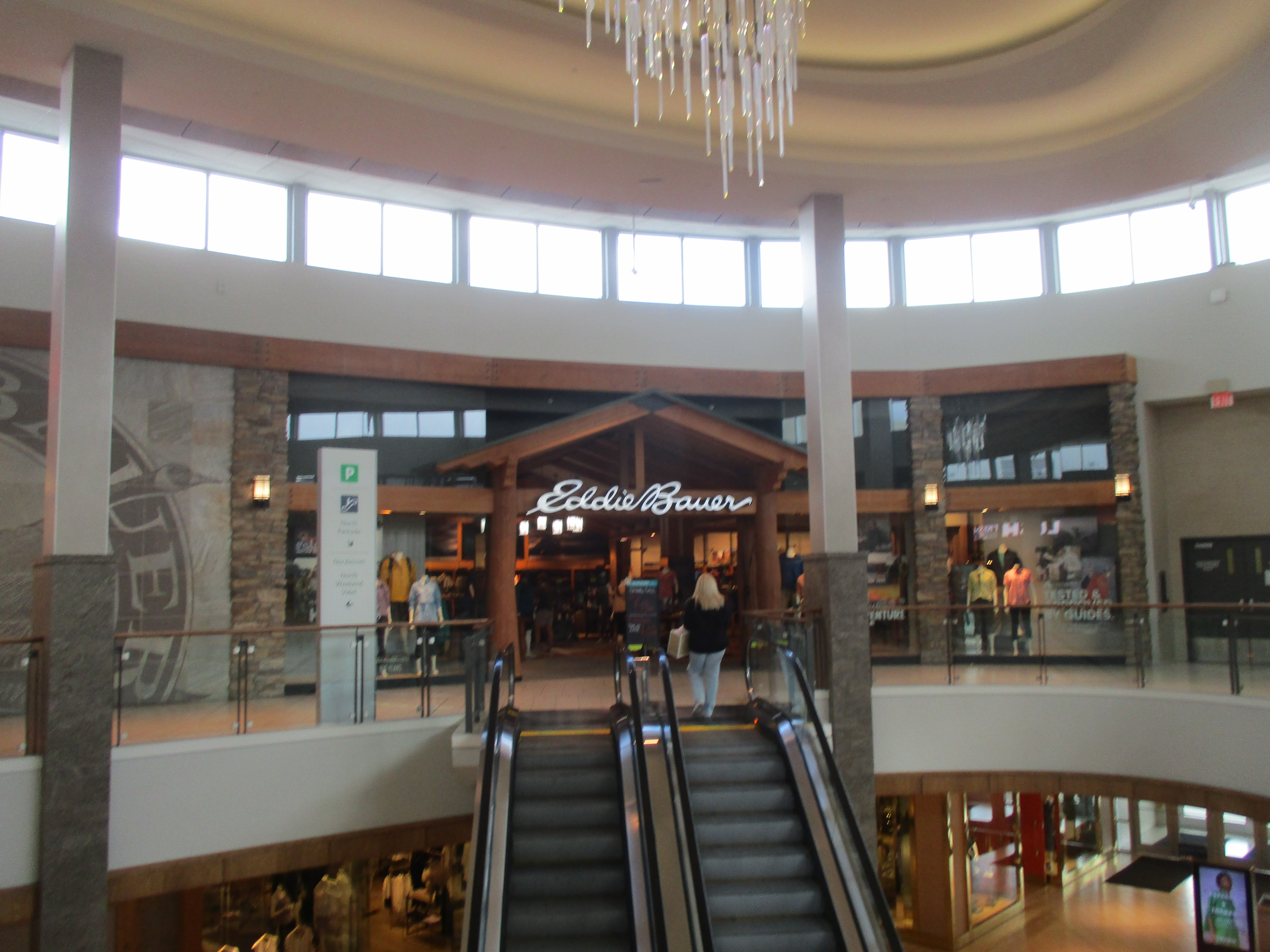
Eddie Bauer in Calgary

In February 2014, Jos. A. Bank announced that it would acquire Eddie Bauer in a cash-and-stock deal valued at $825 million. However, in March 2014, Men's Wearhouse announced the acquisition of Jos. A. Bank and terminated the deal with Eddie Bauer.

In March 2018, Eddie Bauer showcased the Eddie Bauer PET collection in the Global Pet Expo, in collaboration with PetRageous Designs.

In June 2018, Eddie Bauer merged with PacSun, also owned by Golden Gate, to form PSEB.

=== 2021–present: SPARC and Authentic Brands Group ===
In June 2021, the company was acquired by Authentic Brands Group and SPARC Group LLC.

In August 2022, the company partnered with Arrive to facilitate equipment rental and the resale of used equipment.

In September 2022, Tim Bantle was named CEO of the company.

Its flagship store was located in Bellevue at Bellevue Square. The store closed in June 2025. In addition to the three sales channels, the company operates a distribution and fulfillment center in Groveport, Ohio; an IT facility in Westmont, Illinois; and a distribution center in Vaughan, Ontario.

In January 2026, it was reported that Eddie Bauer was preparing to file for Chapter 11 bankruptcy for the third time, as well as the liquidation and permanent closure of all of its nearly 200 stores nationwide. The company's manufacturing, e-commerce, and wholesale operations are not expected to be affected by the potential bankruptcy filing, and will continue to remain operational as the licensee transfers to a new owner, Eddie Bauer Outdoor 5, LLC. Eddie Bauer filed for Chapter 11 bankruptcy in the US, and creditor protection under the Companies' Creditors Arrangement Act in Canada on February 9, 2026. The company blamed the need to file on inflation, supply challenges, and declining sales. The company also confirmed that all stores would close by April 30, 2026, unless they found a buyer to keep the stores open. With no buyer found, closing sales continued, and the final stores closed on April 30, 2026.

== Legal issues ==
=== Dismissed lawsuit over deceptive promotions ===
In July 2020, Jackie Fisher, an Eddie Bauer client, dismissed a lawsuit in which he claimed the company fooled outlet consumers with fake promotions and made-up comparison prices. Fisher said he had purchased jackets on sale because the advertising made it appear that he was getting a great deal.

== Joint ventures ==
=== Japan ===
Eddie Bauer Japan, Inc., a joint venture between Eddie Bauer, Inc. and Otto-Japan, Inc., a subsidiary of the Otto Versand, was formed in 1994 to operate stores and mail order in Japan. The company opened its first store in September 1994 in Tokyo. In October 2021, the company announced the closure all of its operations in Japan by December 2021.

=== Germany ===
In June 1995, Eddie Bauer Germany was announced as a joint venture between Eddie Bauer Inc. and two members of Otto Versand (now Otto GmbH): Heinrich Heine GmbH (Heine Group) and Sport Scheck to operate stores and mail order in Germany. In March 2008, the company transferred its interest in the joint venture.

== Supplier of clothing in expeditions ==
Eddie Bauer supplied clothing for several notable mountain expeditions:

- The 1953 American Karakoram expedition was the fifth attempt since 1909 to climb K2. Team member Art Gilkey died in an apparent avalanche during the team's descent. His body was lost until 1993 when it emerged from the glacier about a mile from the base camp. Gilkey was still wearing his red Eddie Bauer down parka, an item that was standard issue for the members of the expedition.
- On 5 July 1958, Pete Schoening and Andy Kauffman were the first men to stand atop Gasherbrum I, the 11th highest mountain in the world. Eddie Bauer supplied the eight man American expedition with "Kara Koram Parkas" that utilized a ripstop nylon shell.
- On 1 May 1963, around 1:00 pm Jim Whittaker, who worked for REI and was outfitted in Eddie Bauer outerwear, became the first American to stand atop Mount Everest. The American Mount Everest Expedition had to walk the 180 miles from Kathmandu, Nepal, to base camp with 27 tons of gear, which took a month and 900 porters. At the end of April, expedition leader Norman Dyhrenfurth informed Whittaker that he and Nawang Gombu Sherpa will make the first summit attempt.
- Three weeks after Whittaker and Gombu reached the top of Everest, four other team members followed suit on 22 May. The four were forced to bivouac and used their Eddie Bauer down clothing for shelter.

Every member of the American Mt. Everest Expedition 1963 was outfitted from head to toe with Eddie BAUER 100% northern goose down insulated parkas, pants, underwear, mitts, booties and sleeping bags.

— 1965 Eddie Bauer Advertisement

- In 1965, Mount Kennedy was North America's highest unclimbed peak. The National Geographic Society asked Jim Whittaker to lead an expedition to Mount Kennedy in Canada's Yukon. Whittaker's team included Senator Robert F. Kennedy who, on 24 March became the first man to reach the summit.

When I went climbing with Robert [Kennedy], I picked him up at the airport, took a look at his Abercrombie & Fitch yellow jackets and said, this won’t do ... With Eddie Bauer, there will be no kid left inside!

— Jim Whittaker

- In 1958 and 1965, Eddie Bauer went to the South Pole as part of scientific expeditions. In 1966 the American Antarctica Mountaineering Expedition set out to climb the major Antarctic peaks. All the climbs were successful making first ascents of the six highest mountains in the Sentinel Range. One of the first ascents took place on December 18 when Pete Schoening, William Long, James Corbet and John Evans reached the summit of Vinson Massif, one of the world's "Seven Summits" and Antarctica's highest mountain. Expedition leader, Nicholas Clinch wrote a letter to Eddie Bauer from Vinson Camp II stating

Our existence in these mountains is one long struggle to stay warm. Everyone agrees that it would be impossible to survive, let alone climb, without our superb Bauer down equipment, which protects us 24 hours a day. My Bauer down jacket is my happiness and security blanket-when I am not wearing it, it is never more than an arm's length away. A large share of the credit for the success of this expedition can be attributed to our Bauer equipment, which is the finest we have ever seen.

— Nicholas Clinch

- Dr. James Morrissey led the American Dhaulagiri Expedition that set out to summit the 7th highest mountain in the world. Eddie Bauer developed the Kara Koram Expedition pants for the Dhaulagiri expedition as well as providing the team with Kara Koram Expedition parkas and sleeping bags. On 12 May 1973, John Roskelley and Louis Reichardt made the first American ascent of Dhaulagiri with Nawang Samden Sherpa. They did so without using supplemental oxygen making Dhaulagiri the highest peak at the time to be summited without bottled oxygen.
- In the summer of 1977, Galen Rowell organized a 6-man expedition to Great Trango Tower, a 20,623-foot unclimbed granite spire in Pakistan. Expedition member, John Roskelley wrote to Eddie Bauer requesting that he be able to use the down gear originally intended for an unsuccessful spring expedition to Makalu on the Trango expedition and the company agreed. On 21 July, all five climbers of the expedition were the first in history to reach the summit of Great Trango Tower.

Notable Expeditions outfitted by Eddie Bauer
Year	Destination	Organizer/Leader	First Ascent
1953	K2	Charles Snead Houston	
1954	Makalu	William Siri	First Attempt
1953	Lhotse	Norman Dyhrenfurth	
1958	Gasherbrum I	Nicholas B. Clinch	First Ascent: Pete Schoening & Andy Kauffman
1958	Masherbrum	Nicholas B. Clinch	First Ascent: George Irving Bell & Willi Unsoeld
1963	Everest (South Col)	Norman Dyhrenfurth	First American Ascent: Jim Whittaker
1963	Everest (West Ridge)	Norman Dyhrenfurth	First Ascent: Tom Hornbein & Willi Unsoeld
1965	Kennedy	Jim Whittaker	First Ascent: Robert F. Kennedy
1966	Vinson Massif	Nicholas B. Clinch	First Ascent: Pete Schoening, William Long, James Corbet & John Evans
1973	Dhaulagiri	Dr. James Morrissey	First American Ascent: John Roskelley and Louis Reichardt
1974	Lenin Peak	Pete Schoening	First American Ascent: Pete Schoening, Frank Sarnquist, Chris Kopczynski and Molly Higgins
1976	Nanda Devi (North Ridge)	Louis Reichardt, Ad Carter, Willi Unsoeld & Nanda Devi Unsoeld	First Ascent: John Roskelley, Jim States & Louis Reichardt
1977	Great Trango Tower	Galen Rowell	First Ascent: Galen Rowell, John Roskelley, Dennis Hennek, Kim Schmitz and Dr. Jim Morrissey
1977	Makalu	John Roskelley	First American Ascent: John Roskelley
1983	Everest (East Face)	Dr. Jim Morrissey	First Ascent: Louis Reichardt, Carlos Buhler & Kim Momb
