= C&R Clothiers =

American men's clothing retailer

- Industry: Clothing retail
- Founded: 1948; 78 years ago
- Defunct: 1996
- Fate: Bankruptcy; Some stores sold to Men's Wearhouse
- Headquarters: Culver City, California, United States
- Number of locations: 67 stores (1990)

C&R Clothiers was a large chain of men's suit and furnishings stores based in Culver City, California. As of 1990 it had 67 stores across California. The chain dates back to 1948.

The company declared bankruptcy in 1996 and sold some of the stores to Men's Wearhouse, which created a Value Priced Clothing division from both C&R Clothiers Inc. and the NAL chain.
