= Puffa =

Puffa may refer to

- Puffa (character), a character from the children's television series "Tugs"
- Puffa jacket, a type of padded jacket
