= George Zimmer =

American businessman

- Born: November 21, 1948 (age 77); New York City, U.S.
- Education: Washington University in St. Louis
- Occupation: Businessman
- Known for: Founder, Men's Wearhouse
- Spouse: Lorri Zimmer
- Children: 4

George Zimmer (born November 21, 1948) is an American businessman. He is the founder, former executive chairman (1973–2013) and former CEO (1973–2011) of the Men's Wearhouse, a clothing retailer with more than 1,200 stores in the US and Canada, under the brands Moores, Men's Wearhouse and K&G Superstores. After leaving his executive position with the company, he continued as the company's spokesperson, until he was fired in June 2013. Zimmer is now the founder, chairman, and CEO of Generation Tux, an online tuxedo and suit rental platform, and zTailors, a national network of on-demand tailors for men and women.

== Early life and education ==
Zimmer was born to a Jewish family in New York City. He attended primary school in Scarsdale, New York, before studying at Washington University in St. Louis where he was a member of the phi chapter of Sigma Alpha Mu, and where he earned a bachelor's degree in economics in 1970. Upon graduation, he worked as a substitute teacher before joining his father in the clothing manufacturing business. Later in the early 1970s, he worked as a purchasing agent and salesman in Hong Kong and Dallas, Texas.

== Career ==
=== Men's Wearhouse ===
Robert Elkin Zimmer started his own manufacturing company Royalad Apparel which he later expanded into Zimco Industries. In 1973, Robert Elkin Zimmer and his son, George Zimmer, co-founded The Mens Wearhouse in Houston. George Zimmer and his college roommates opened the first Men's Wearhouse store in 1973 in Houston. Beginning in 1986, Zimmer narrated and appeared in many of his company's television commercials, usually closing with the company slogan: "You're going to like the way you look. I guarantee it."

As of a May 9, 2013, proxy filing, Zimmer owned 1.8 million shares of Men's Wearhouse stock, a stake in the company of approximately 3.5 percent. The day prior to his June 19 firing, Men's Wearhouse stock closed at $37.47, indicating a value of Zimmer's holdings in the company of $67.45 million. The company made $2.48 billion in sales for the fiscal year ending in February 2013.

... his longtime boardroom colleagues, in his telling, ambushed and fired him two years after he turned over his CEO role to his handpicked successor, Doug Ewert.

On June 19, 2013, The Men's Wearhouse board dismissed Zimmer for unspecified reasons and declined to offer any explanation in its press release. The press release stated that terms of Zimmer's severance were still to be discussed with him.

Though the brief press release did not cite reasons for Zimmer's termination, Zimmer himself did shed a little light on the issue to CNBC. "Over the last 40 years, I have built MW into a multibillion-dollar company with amazing employees and loyal customers who value the products and service they receive at MW. Over the past several months I have expressed my concerns to the board about the direction the company is currently heading. Instead of fostering the kind of dialogue in the boardroom that has in part contributed to our success, the board has inappropriately chosen to silence my concerns through termination as an executive officer."

On June 25, 2013, the company, responding to public pressure for more information following its terse original statement, released a detailed explanation of its actions. The statement asserts that Zimmer insisted on full control of the public company. "Neither the board nor management desired a total breakdown of the relationship between Mr. Zimmer and the company. In our discussions with Mr. Zimmer, we made considerable efforts to find a solution that would have allowed him to continue to have a significant involvement with Men's Wearhouse. Unfortunately, Mr. Zimmer wouldn't accept anything other than full control of the company and the board was left with no choice but to terminate him as Executive chairman."

=== zTailors ===
Citing the need to "bring the age-old tradition of tailoring into the modern day," Zimmer founded zTailors, "an on-demand personal tailoring service that gives everyone an opportunity to look their best with just a tap of their smartphone," launching publicly in June 2015. Zimmer is the chairman and CEO of zTailors.

=== Generation Tux ===
Stating a belief that "every aspect of this hallmark experience can be drastically improved," Zimmer founded Generation Tux, "the ultimate high tech, high touch clothing rental experience for the next generation," launching publicly in September 2015. Zimmer is the chairman and CEO of Generation Tux.

== Personal life ==
Zimmer is married to his wife, Lorri; they have four children and live in Oakland, California.

Zimmer's style of corporate management (for example, the company's June 2004 nomination of spiritual guru Deepak Chopra to its board) is peculiar in the view of some, while others perceive his style as cutting edge.

Zimmer's experience caring for his mother, who died of cancer, led him to support research into the therapeutic use of MDMA, and to his efforts to legalize cannabis (for instance, by making donations equaling $170,500 to support California's Proposition 19 in 2010).
