= Generation Tux =

American suit rental company

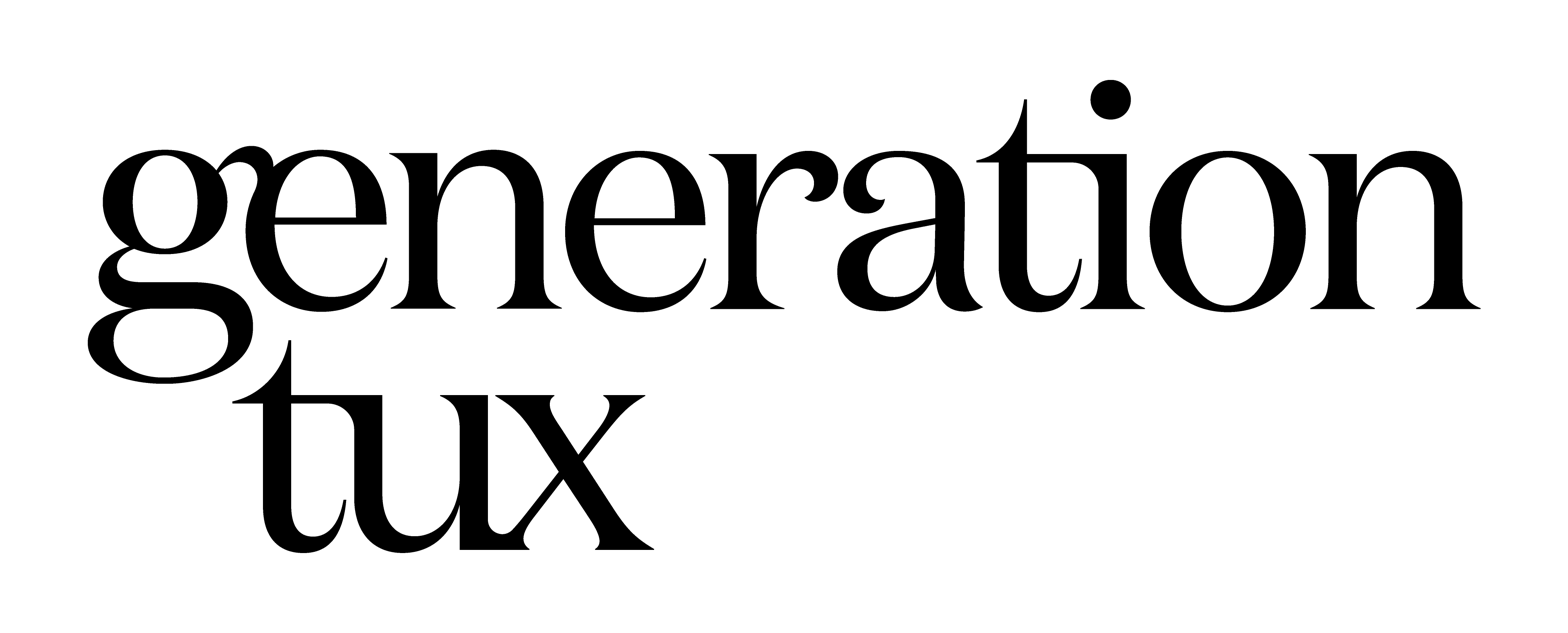
- Company type: Private
- Headquarters: Louisville, Kentucky, USA
- Key people: George Zimmer (Founder)
- Industry: E-commerce
- Website: www.generationtux.com

Generation Tux is an online suit rental company headquartered in Louisville, Kentucky. Founded by Men's Wearhouse founder and former CEO George Zimmer, its primary business is the rental and delivery of suits, tuxedos, and other formalwear accessories by mail.

== History ==
Generation Tux was founded in 2014 after George Zimmer heard about the online suit market and believed he was “probably the only guy in the world who knows that business at scale”. The company started with $6 million of Zimmer's own money, which he used to purchase 30,000 suits and tuxedos, and was officially announced at the Salesforce Dreamforce 2015 conference. In 2017, Generation Tux acquired rival online tuxedo company Menguin for $25 million.

== Services ==
Generation Tux allows users to rent suits, tuxedos, and other formalwear accessories through its website. Users choose a style of suit and customize the way it looks through the use of accessories, and are sized using a "fit algorithm". Garments are then sent out by mail, and users are then given up to 3 days after the event to send them back.
