= Jos. A. Bank =

American men's clothing retailer

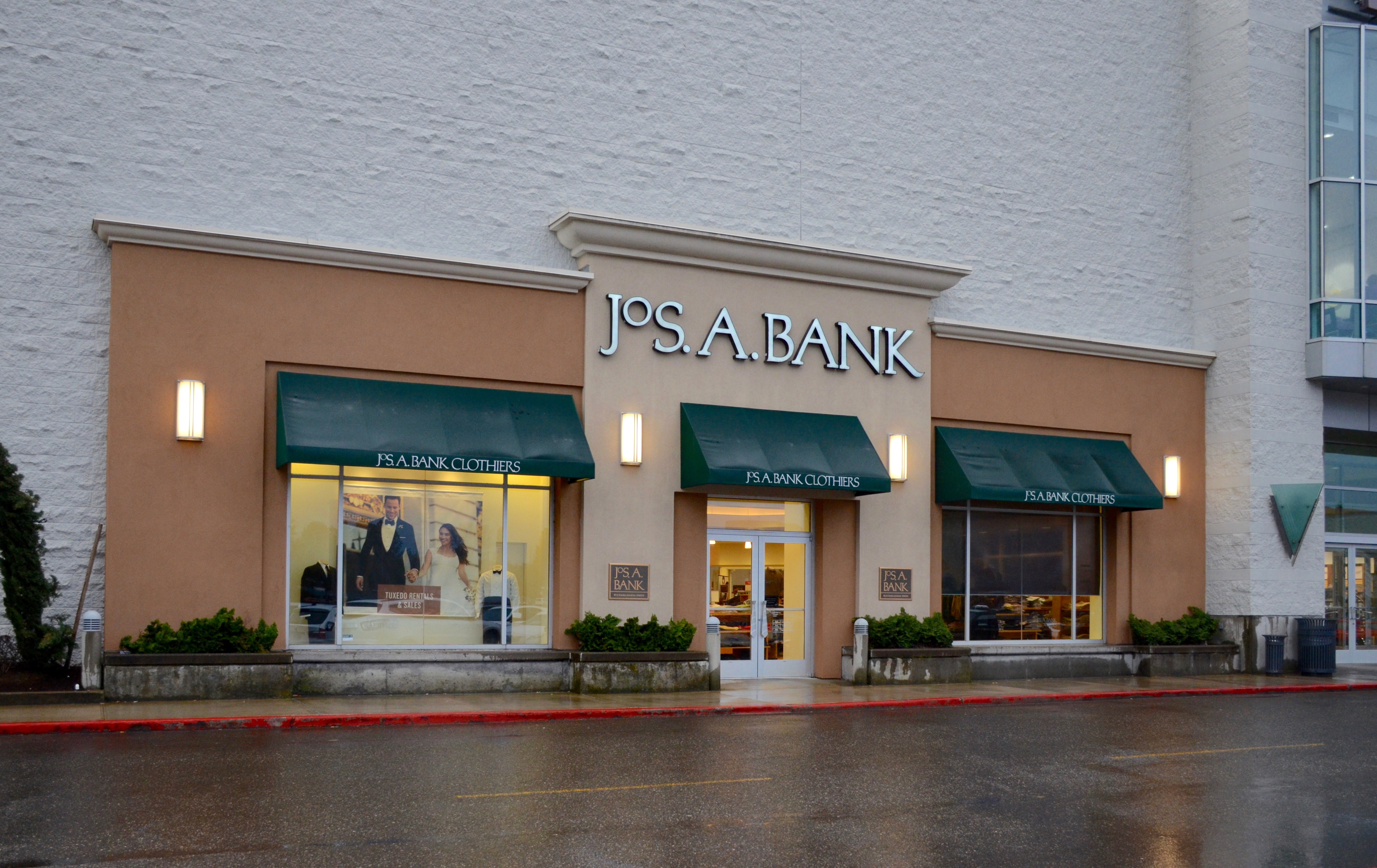
- A Jos. A. Bank store at a shopping mall in Oregon.
- Trade name: Jos. A. Bank
- Type: Subsidiary
- Industry: Clothier
- Founded: 1905; 121 years ago Baltimore, Maryland, U.S.
- Founders: Charles Bank; Joseph Alfred Bank
- Headquarters: Fremont, California, U.S.
- Products: Men's clothing
- Parent: Tailored Brands (2014–present)
- Website: josbank.com

Jos. A. Bank (Note: Jos. is a traditional abbreviation for Joseph.) is an American retailer of men's furnishings specializing in suits. Established in 1905, by Charles Bank and Joseph Alfred Bank, it operates over 180 retail locations and three distribution centers (Atlanta, Houston, and Jenkins). The company is headquartered in Fremont, California. Its parent company, Tailored Brands, also owns K&G Fashion Superstores, Men's Wearhouse, and Moores Clothing for Men in Canada.

Joe Biden and Donald Trump both wore Jos. A. Bank clothing during their presidencies.

== History ==
=== 1886–1945: Beginnings and expansion ===
In 1866, Charles Bank immigrated to Baltimore, Maryland from Lithuania to open a small tailor shop. By the start of the 20th century, he had branched out into the manufacturing of trousers. His grandson, Joseph A. Bank, joined his small company in 1898, as a cloth cutter when he was 11 years old. Over the next ten years, Joseph became a wholesale salesperson, traveling in the South to sell pants.

In 1905, Moses Hartz established a men’s clothing manufacturing company, which was taken over by his widow Lena Hartz in 1921. Their daughter, Anna Hartz, was a traveling salesperson for the firm. Although they were rivals in the business, Anna married Joseph Bank and in 1922, Joseph joined forces with his new mother-in-law and formed L. Hartz and Bank. This new company manufactured and sold suits to retailers throughout the region.

Over the years, the company grew and prospered. In 1940, they purchased a building on Hopkins Place in Baltimore to house their offices, showroom, shipping area, and cutting department.

=== 1945–2014: Independent as Jos. A. Bank and Co. ===
Joseph Bank and his son, Howard, bought out the Hartz interest in the company and formed Jos. A. Bank and Co. in 1945.

Following World War II, there was a severe shortage of men's tailored clothing. A decision was made to specialize in that merchandise and to sell directly to the consumer, rather than wholesale. As a result, a deal was struck with a retailer, Louie's, Inc., in Washington, D.C., to sell their clothing.

In 1954, Joseph Bank died, and the operation of the company was assumed by Howard Bank.

By 1981, Jos. A. Bank had eleven retail stores and a growing catalog business. CEO Leonard Ginsberg (married to Mitzi, the daughter of Joseph and Anna Bank) decided to sell the company. Ginsberg was the last family member tied to the original Jos. A. Bank family business. That year, the company was purchased by the Quaker Oats Company and became part of their Specialty Retail group along with Eyelab and Brookstone. The relationship proved mutually beneficial, and by 1985, there were 25 stores. In 1986, Quaker decided to concentrate its efforts on its core businesses and Jos. A. Bank once again became a privately owned corporation. In 1992, their expansion included a franchise concept. Jos. A. Bank Clothiers became a publicly owned company in the Spring of 1994, trading its stock through the NASDAQ stock exchange (JOSB).

In 1998, Jos. A. Bank Clothiers sold its manufacturing division and now out-sources its production. This has enabled the company to focus on its retail business. Much of the tailored clothing is “factory direct”.

Jos. A. Bank launched its Internet site in August 1998.

=== 2013–2014: Botched acquisitions, then acquired by MW ===
On 12 November 2013, Ricky Sandler, CEO of Eminence Capital LLC, published a letter he sent to Men's Wearhouse CEO Douglas Ewert discussing a merger with Jos. A. Bank Clothiers Inc as part of an ongoing attempt by Jos. A. Bank to merge with Men's Wearhouse. In December 2013, Jos. A Bank turned down the takeover offer from competitor Men’s Wearhouse, saying the $1.54 billion bid was far too low.

On February 14, 2014, Jos. A. Bank Clothiers announced plans to buy outdoor retailer Eddie Bauer in an $825 million deal. Men’s Wearhouse quickly filed a lawsuit to block the proposed deal on the basis that it served only to make Jos. A. Bank an undesirable acquisition target. The lawsuit was expedited by Delaware Judge J. Travis Laster, who agreed that the Eddie Bauer deal was likely defensive posturing on the part of Jos. A. Bank. According to Laster, the Eddie Bauer transaction may well have fallen “outside the range of reasonableness.” Laster ordered Jos. A. Bank to submit documents pertaining to the acquisition and required it to notify Men’s Wearhouse at least 10 days before closing a deal with Eddie Bauer.

On March 11, 2014, Jos. A. Bank and Men's Wearhouse announced that both boards of directors had agreed to merge, with Men's Wearhouse acquiring Jos. A. Bank for $1.8 billion. As part of the deal, Bank terminated its plan to acquire Eddie Bauer, and they both formed the new entity Tailored Brands.
