= Eddie Bauer (outdoorsman) =

American outdoorsman

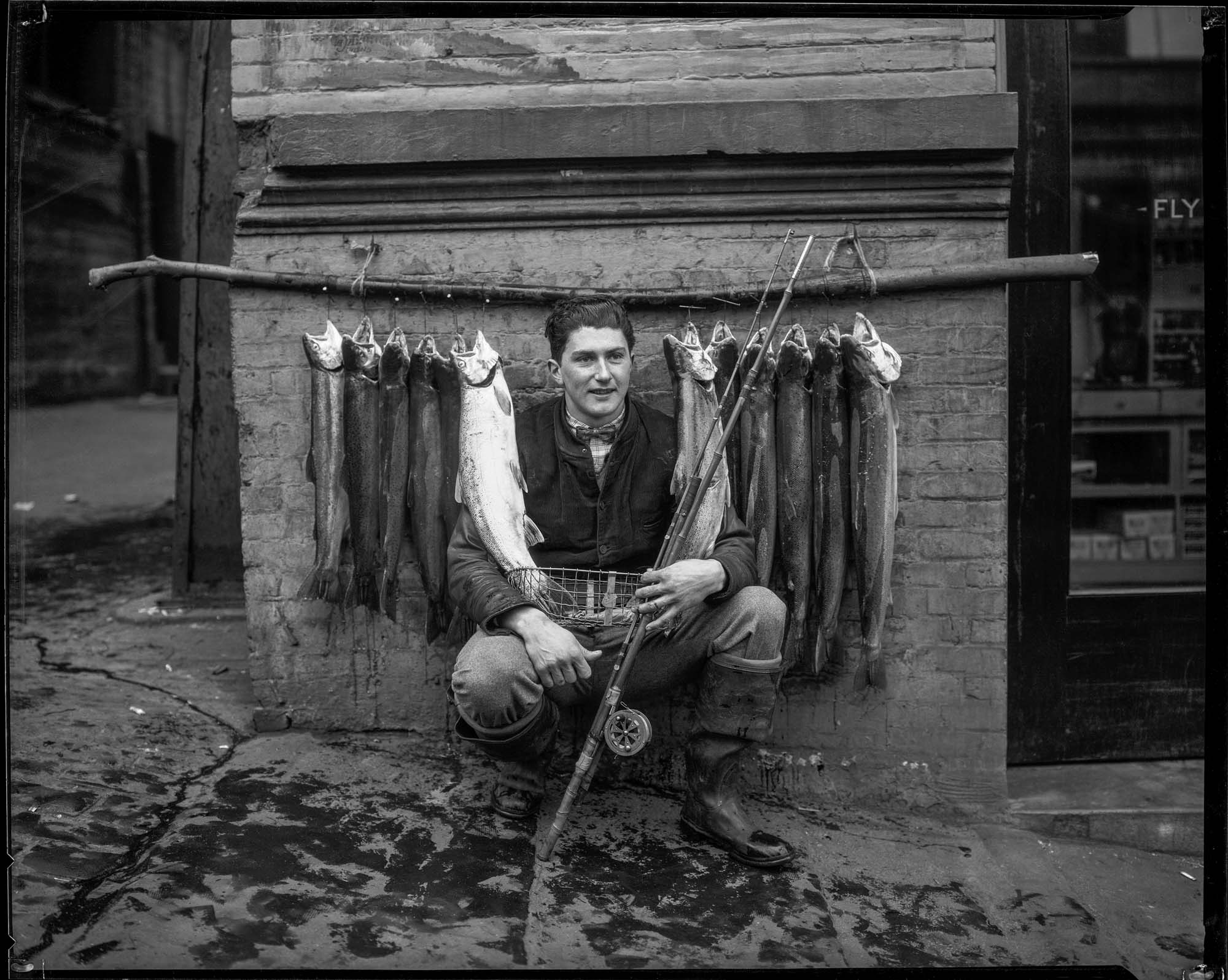
- Eddie Bauer with steelhead trout, 1926
- Born: October 19, 1899; Orcas Island, Washington, US
- Died: April 18, 1986 (aged 86); Bellevue, Washington, US
- Occupations: Founder, inventor, outfitter
- Spouse: Christine Heltborg (m. 1929; died 1986)
- Website: eddiebauer.com

Eddie Bauer (October 19, 1899 – April 18, 1986) was an American outdoorsman, inventor, author, and businessman. He founded the Eddie Bauer company to sell tennis-related items in Seattle, Washington, in 1920. From a rented workbench inside another man's shop, it grew to become an international brand outfitting mountaineering and scientific expeditions with down-insulated garments and sleeping bags.

== Early life ==
Bauer's passion for the outdoors was apparent from an early age. Born outside of Eastsound, Washington, on Orcas Island in 1899, he grew up exploring the woods and waters of the Pacific Northwest, learning to fish before he was in school, and to hunt before he was a teenager.

His parents, Jacob and Mary Catherine Bauer, were of German ancestry; they immigrated to Seattle from Russia in 1890, the year after the Great Seattle Fire when the city was booming with reconstruction. Bauer's father worked variously as the manager of a plum orchard, the caretaker of a country club, and as a carpenter on Seattle's first world's fair, the 1909 Alaska-Yukon-Pacific Exposition.

== Career ==
At age 13, the young Bauer left school and went to work at Seattle's Piper & Taft, one of the largest sporting goods and outfitting stores on the West Coast. For the next six years he apprenticed among the experienced hunters and fishermen on staff. At the age of 20, he left Piper & Taft and went into business for himself.

=== Bauer's Sport Shop ===
In February 1920, Bauer rented space in Bob Newton's Gun Shop, set up a workbench, and opened Eddie Bauer's Tennis Shop, where he sold and strung tennis rackets. Seven months later, around Labor Day, he put up a sign on his bench, "Eddie Bauer has gone hunting. Back February 1st." That practice of spending a significant portion of the year in the backcountry became a hallmark of Bauer's operation when his business expanded enough to support his own space and he shifted its primary focus to outfitting outdoorsmen. While unconventional, it gave him the opportunity to develop and test the products that established his reputation as an outfitter for expeditions all over the world.

His backcountry experience was also a key component in his offering an unconditional guarantee on everything he sold. As an outdoorsman, Bauer understood that in the wilderness, clothing and gear was vital. His groundbreaking development of the Skyliner, the first down jacket patented in America (U.S. Patent D119,122; 1940), came as the result of his suffering nearly fatal hypothermia on a winter fishing trip in 1935. In his words, "There can be no compromising quality when lives depend on performance."

With the development of down-insulated garments and sleeping bags, Bauer's expedition outfitting operation grew substantially. Designed and constructed in Seattle, the products were field-tested both in the mountains of the Pacific Northwest and in cold-storage lockers in downtown Seattle to ensure they would stand up to their unconditional guarantee, and to the company's claim, "Built for service you'll never require."

=== World War II production ===
Six months after the bombing of Pearl Harbor on December 7, 1941, the Japanese attacked the Aleutian Islands, establishing garrisons on two of the islands, Attu and Kiska. This set in motion the year-long Aleutian Islands Campaign to remove the invaders from the Alaska Territory.

In October 1941, Bauer was granted his second and third design patents for quilted down apparel—a down parka (U.S. Patent D130,167) and pants (U.S. Patent D130,166) that created a cold-weather suit he intended for Alaskan bush pilots and others who spent significant time in severe weather. In the early days of the Aleutian Campaign, some of the American pilots were buying this cold weather suit, and early in 1943 the U.S. Army Air Forces contacted Bauer, asking him to design a "cold weather buoyancy flight suit" for them.

At Wright Field in Dayton, Ohio, Bauer designed the down-insulated B-9 Parka and A-8 Flight Pants. During the course of the war, Bauer manufactured approximately 50,000 of these suits. He also made 200,000 down sleeping bags for the military as part of the war effort.

=== Expedition outfitting ===
The 1950s have been called the Golden Age of Himalayan Mountaineering, as twelve of the world's fourteen 8000-meter peaks were first summited in that decade, with the first being Annapurna in 1950. In 1953, a team of seven Americans and one British climber was attempting the first ascent of K2, the world's second highest peak. Three of the Americans were from Seattle, and they came to Bauer to ask if he could create a down-insulated parka for them.

Bauer and his team built the Kara Koram Parka, named for the mountain range where K2 is located. In a letter to Bauer's partner, William F. Niemi, dated January 18, 1953, expedition leader Charles Snead Houston called it, "the finest article of cold weather, high altitude equipment I have ever seen".

While unsuccessful in reaching the summit, the Third American Karakoram Expedition is widely admired for their heroic efforts to work together in surviving under catastrophic conditions. Their reputation, and enthusiastic endorsement of Bauer's parka, sealed Bauer's reputation as an expedition outfitter, and led to his down-insulated gear being used on many historic expeditions, including first ascents of Gasherbrum I (1958), Masherbrum (1960), and Antarctica's Vinson Massif (1966), as well as the first American ascent of Mount Everest (1963)

=== Wanapum Kennels ===
As an outdoorsman, Bauer had worked with many breeds of field dogs until 1930, when he purchased a young Labrador retriever in British Columbia. He was so impressed by the dog's strength, stamina, and intelligence that he never owned another breed of field dog again. In 1960, he formed Wanapum Kennels to breed and raise champion field trial Labradors. His first dog of note was Dart of Netley Creek, who whelped several champions. The most famous of these was Wanapum Dart's Dandy, who became the first American Labrador retriever to be a Triple Crown national champion, and was inducted into the Retriever Hall of Fame.

== Retirement activities ==
In 1968, Bauer and his son, Eddie Christian, sold their interests in the Eddie Bauer company to their partners, William F. Niemi, Sr. and Jr. For many years after, Bauer continued an active pursuit of his passion for hunting and fishing, as well as for his Wanapum dogs. In 1972, he designed and patented a fishing lure, the B&B Flasher (U.S. Patent 3,673,727). In 1974, Bauer was named Retriever Breeder of the Year. In 1982 and 1983, he co-authored with Archie Satterfield three titles for the Eddie Bauer Outdoor Library: The Eddie Bauer Guide To Family Camping, The Eddie Bauer Guide to Cross-Country Skiing, and The Eddie Bauer Guide to Backpacking.

== Personal life ==
On a hunting trip in eastern Washington in the fall of 1927, Bauer met Christine "Stine" Heltborg, a young beauty shop owner from Seattle. Their first date was a fishing trip the following spring. They were married in February. Bauer referred to his wife as "my wilderness companion", and said that she had more stamina in the backcountry than he did.

In addition to being an accomplished outdoorswoman, Stine Bauer was a champion markswoman, winning the Washington State Women's Trapshooting Championship eight years running, from 1930 to 1937. Her string ended when she retired with the birth of their child, Eddie Christian, on February 5, 1938.

Bauer died on April 18, 1986, two weeks after his wife.

== Patents ==
- Shuttlecock (2,025,325; 1935)
- Method of Weighting Shuttlecock (2,093,301; 1937)
- Skyliner Down Jacket (D119,122; 1940)
- Bauer Down Parka (D130,167; 1941)
- Bauer Down Pants (D130,166; 1941)
- Down Anorak (D132,803; 1942)
- Down Mukluks (D133,356; 1942)
- Down Sleeping Bag (2,338,226; 1944)
- Swiss Model Down Ski Jacket (D138,336; 1944)
- Yukon Down Jacket (D139,242; 1944)
- Down Hooded Jacket (D139,535; 1944)
- Down Vest (D139,536; 1944)
- Down Jacket (D139,537; 1944)
- Four Season Down Coat (D194,967; 1963)
- B&B Flasher Fishing Lure (3,673,727; 1972)

== Publications ==
- Satterfield, Archie; Bauer, Eddie (1982). The Eddie Bauer Guide To Family Camping. The Eddie Bauer Company, Inc. ISBN 0-201-07776-0.
- Satterfield, Archie; Bauer, Eddie (1983). The Eddie Bauer Guide To Cross-Country Skiing. Eddie Bauer, Inc. ISBN 0-201-07774-4.
- Satterfield, Archie; Bauer, Eddie (1983). The Eddie Bauer Guide To Backpacking. Eddie Bauer, Inc. ISBN 0-201-07797-3.
