= Moores =

Canadian men's clothing company

Moores the Suit People, Corp.
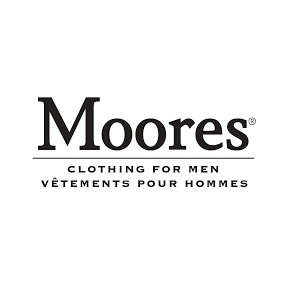
- Trade name: Moores Clothing for Men
- Type: Subsidiary
- Industry: Retail
- Founded: 1980
- Founders: Martin Prosserman; David Moore
- Headquarters: 129 Carlingview Drive; Toronto, Ontario; M9W 5E7
- Number of locations: 126 (April 2016)
- Key people: Joseph Aboud (CEO)
- Products: Men's clothing
- Parent: Tailored Brands (1999–present)
- Website: mooresclothing.ca

Moores the Suit People, Corp. (operating as Moores Clothing for Men) is a Canadian company specializing in business clothing and formalwear for men. It is an affiliate of Men's Wearhouse in the United States.

The company's ad slogan is "Well Made, Well Priced, Well Dressed".

== History ==
The company was established in 1980 as a single, family-owned store in Mississauga in the Greater Toronto Area, with 12 employees. Its founders were Martin Prosserman and David Moore, who, as a minority shareholder, was bought out in 1982.

In 1999, the Moores Retail Group was acquired by American-based The Men’s Wearhouse, Inc. (renamed Tailored Brands in 2016).

Today, Moores has 126 retail locations situated all over Canada and employs over 1200 people. Its current headquarters are in the Toronto district of Etobicoke.

In September 2008, Men's Wearhouse selected the New York advertising agency DeVito/Verdi to handle its national advertising and marketing communications account, as well as marketing for Moores and Men's Wearhouse's retail brands. The assignment called for the agency to provide full service marketing support and to develop strategic planning, advertising, public relations, market planning, promotions, and P-O-S programs. In addition to the Men's Wearhouse brand, DeVito/Verdi handled marketing for the company's other retail brands: K&G, MW Tux, as well as new projects in development.

In 2014, Moores was named as one of that year's "Best Workplaces in Canada" by The Globe and Mail. In 2018, Moores was said to be the "largest provider of tuxedo and suit rentals in Canada."

In August 2020, Moores' parent company, Tailored Brands, filed for bankruptcy.

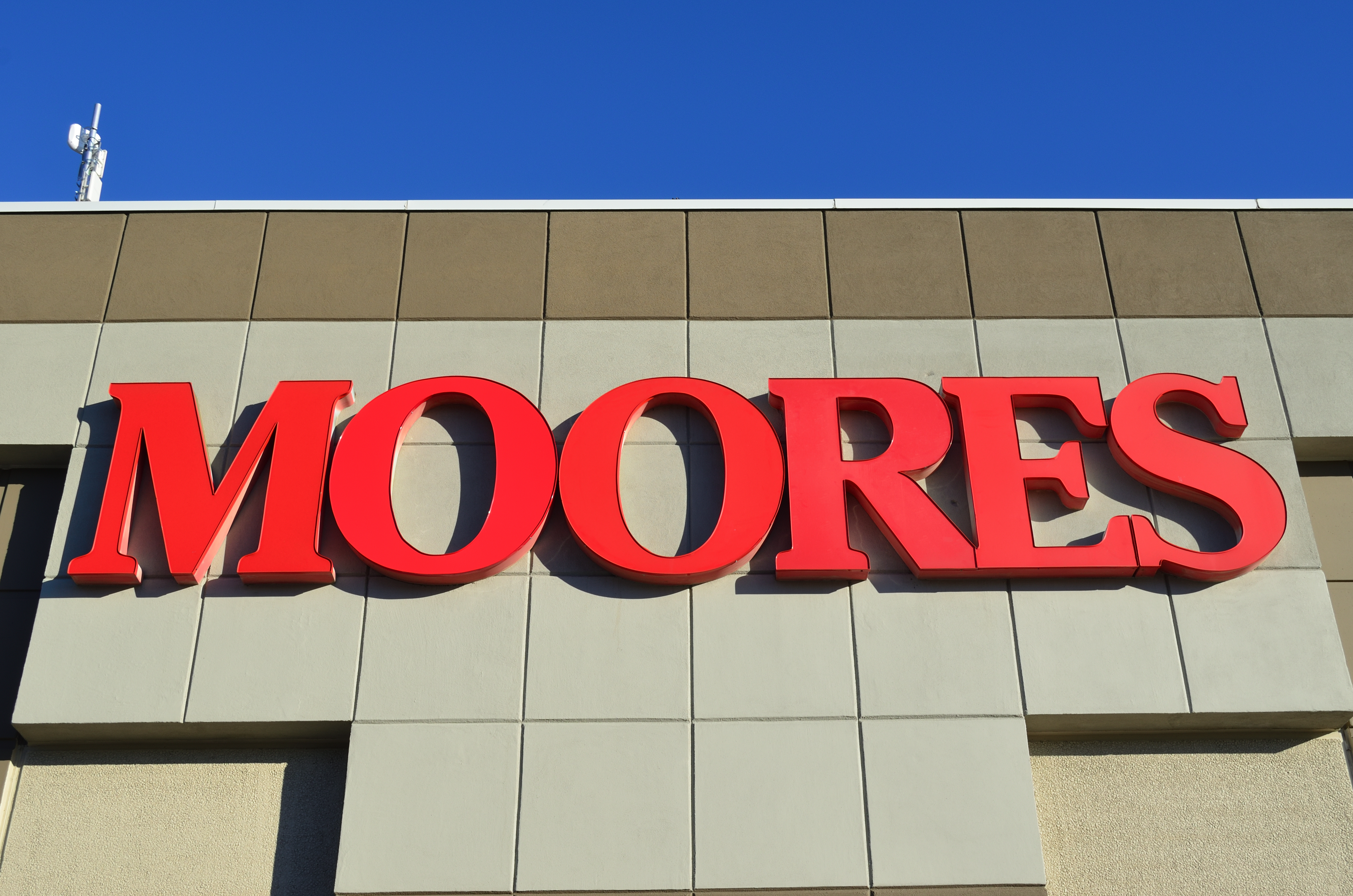
Moores Clothing for Men store in Markham, Ontario

== See also ==
- Tailored Brands
- List of Canadian clothing store chains
