= Down jacket =

Quilted, padded jacket

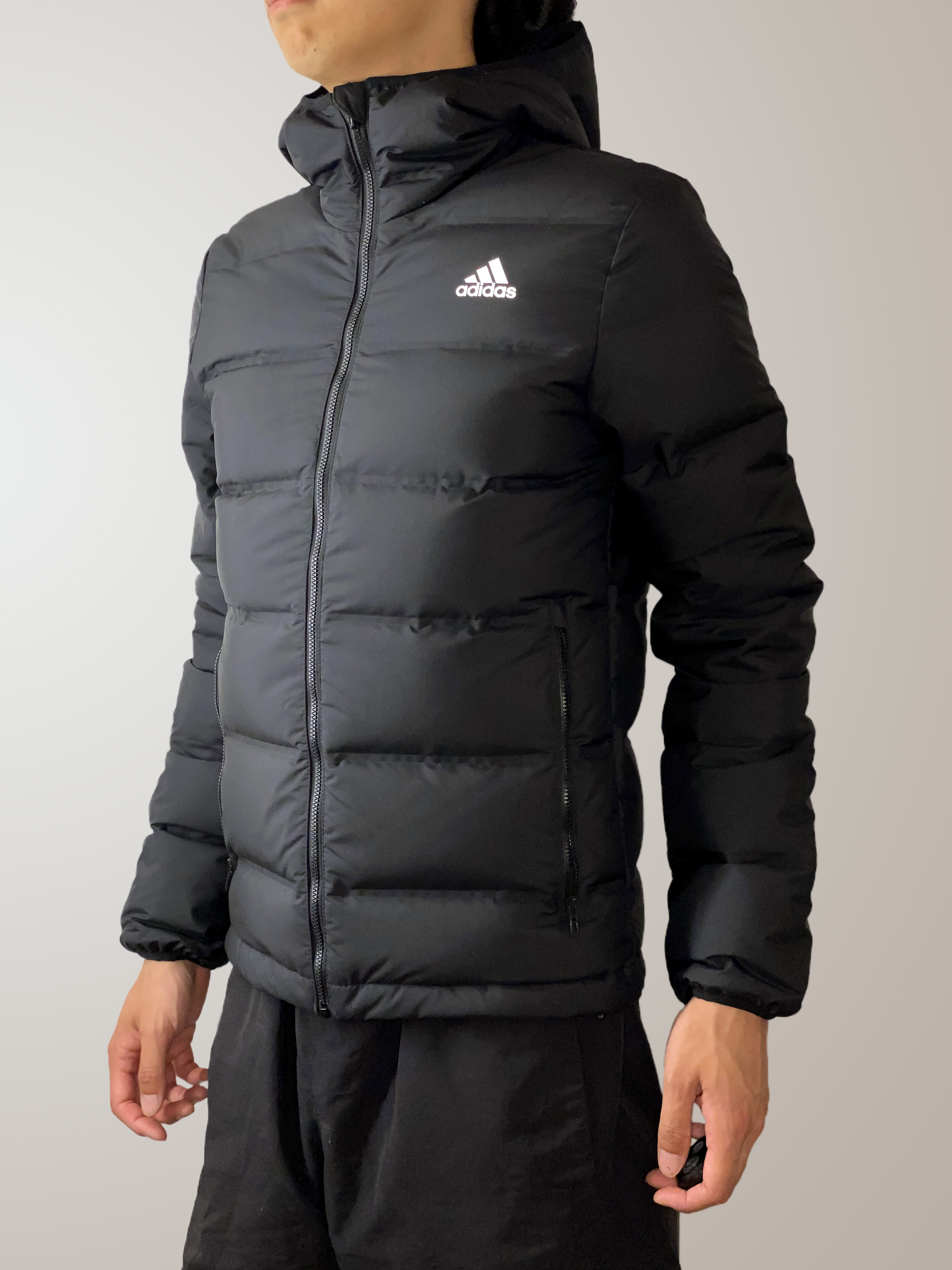
A typical, modern, hooded down jacket featuring seamless quilted baffles filled with down.

Down jacket, known more commonly in the fashion industry as a puffer jacket or simply puffer, is a quilted winter jacket which is insulated with either duck or goose feathers. Air pockets created by the bulk of the feathers allow for the retention of warm air. The term down jacket is named after down feather, which is used in the jacket.

== Properties ==
Down is favored among hikers and backpackers because it can easily compress into a small size to fit in a backpack, and it has the highest warmth to weight ratio. The down's loft in the jacket is measured with the term "fill power" which represents the number of cubic inches one ounce fills. For example, one ounce of 700 fill-power down will fill 700 cubic inches. A jacket with larger fill power will compress better and have a lighter weight relative to the jacket's volume and warmth. Usually goose down is loftier than duck down. "Box construction" baffles are warmer than "sewn through" baffles.

In contrast, if water absorbs into the jacket's down material, the down looses its puffy loft, and loses its warmth until it dries again. Some down jackets will be durable water repellent (DWR) which indicates that it can withstand a light drizzle of water for about an hour before it soaks into the jacket. Some jackets use hydrophobic down (i.e., down coated with hydrophobic material) to delay the absorption of water into the jacket. If a jacket does not have hydrophobic down or DWR, those properties can be easily added at home with products. Also, some down jackets are labelled as "downproof" to indicate that it will leak down feather less than a typical down jacket.

Real down has better warmth to weight ratio and compressibility compared to synthetic, but synthetic down has better water resistance. They are both equally durable.

== Fashion history ==
George Finch, an Australian chemist and mountaineer, is credited with first wearing a version of the down jacket in 1922, originally made from balloon fabric and eiderdown. In 1936, outdoor adventurer Eddie Bauer created a down jacket following a hazardous fishing trip during which Bauer almost died of hypothermia; the adventurer invented an outer jacket encased with feathers, originally sold as the "skyliner". An efficient insulator, the outer garment allowed for the trapping and retention of warm air, making it a very popular choice for those enduring harsh winter conditions. Bauer was first to create, sell and patent his design in 1939. In 1937 designer Charles James developed a jacket with a similar design for haute couture. James's jacket was made of white satin yet maintained a similar, quilted design; he labelled his creation the "pneumatic jacket". James' design proved hard to replicate and thick padding throughout the interior of the coat made upper-body mobility difficult. The designer believed his contribution would be minor. This error was remedied shortly after by reducing padding around the neck and armholes.

Following its debut, the down jacket remained popular within winter outdoor sports communities for a decade. The puffer would begin to serve more than its utilitarian purpose in the 1940s, when it was tailored and marketed to the wealthy as an evening layer. The garment was reimagined in the 1970s as an athleisure jacket specifically marketed towards women by designer Norma Kamali. Named the "sleeping bag jacket", Kamali's version featured two coats sewn together with a synthetic down alternative packed between. Bright neon coloured versions of the puffer were worn in Italy throughout the 1980s.

During the 1990s the jacket surged in popularity as a young generation of ravers would adorn themselves in the puffer, wearing it throughout the night during the winter months. A similar trend was witnessed in the United States throughout the 1990s and into the early 2000s, during which popular hip-hop artists began dressing themselves in the large jackets.

Designers and fashion influencers of 2020 reject cropped, bright-colored versions of the jacket, opting instead for a longer, knee-length layer with subtle shades of beige. Influencers continue to praise the garment for its ability to work with every outfit occasion. A surge in 1990s continues to help the jacket dominate. Pop culture reflects this trend as North American hip-hop artists like Kanye West and Drake may both be seen wearing the garment in recent music videos. In 2024, however, cropped puffer jackets continue to be in fashion.

== Gallery ==
Derivatives and styles of down jackets

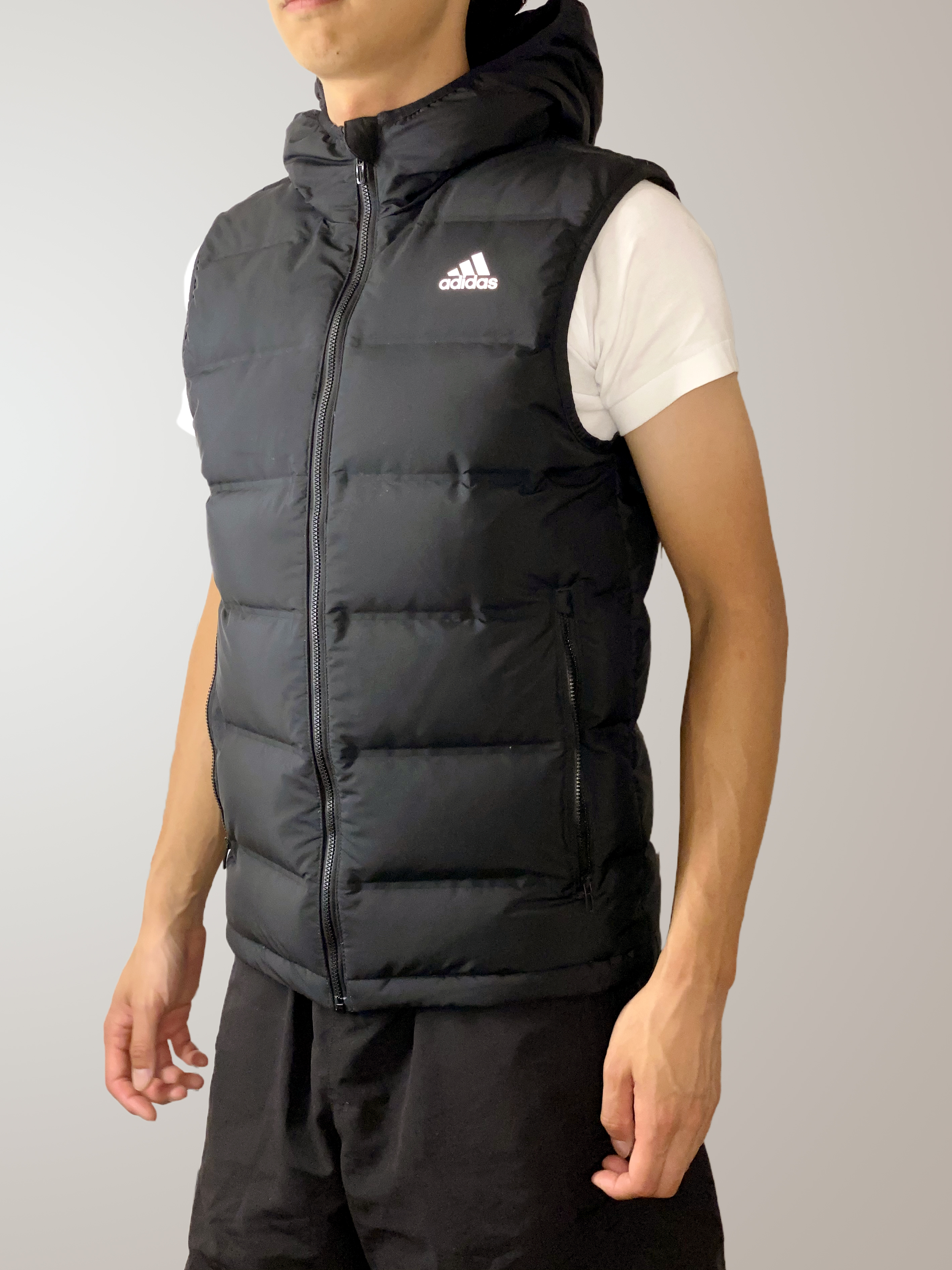
Down vest/gilet: The same model as the above without the sleeves

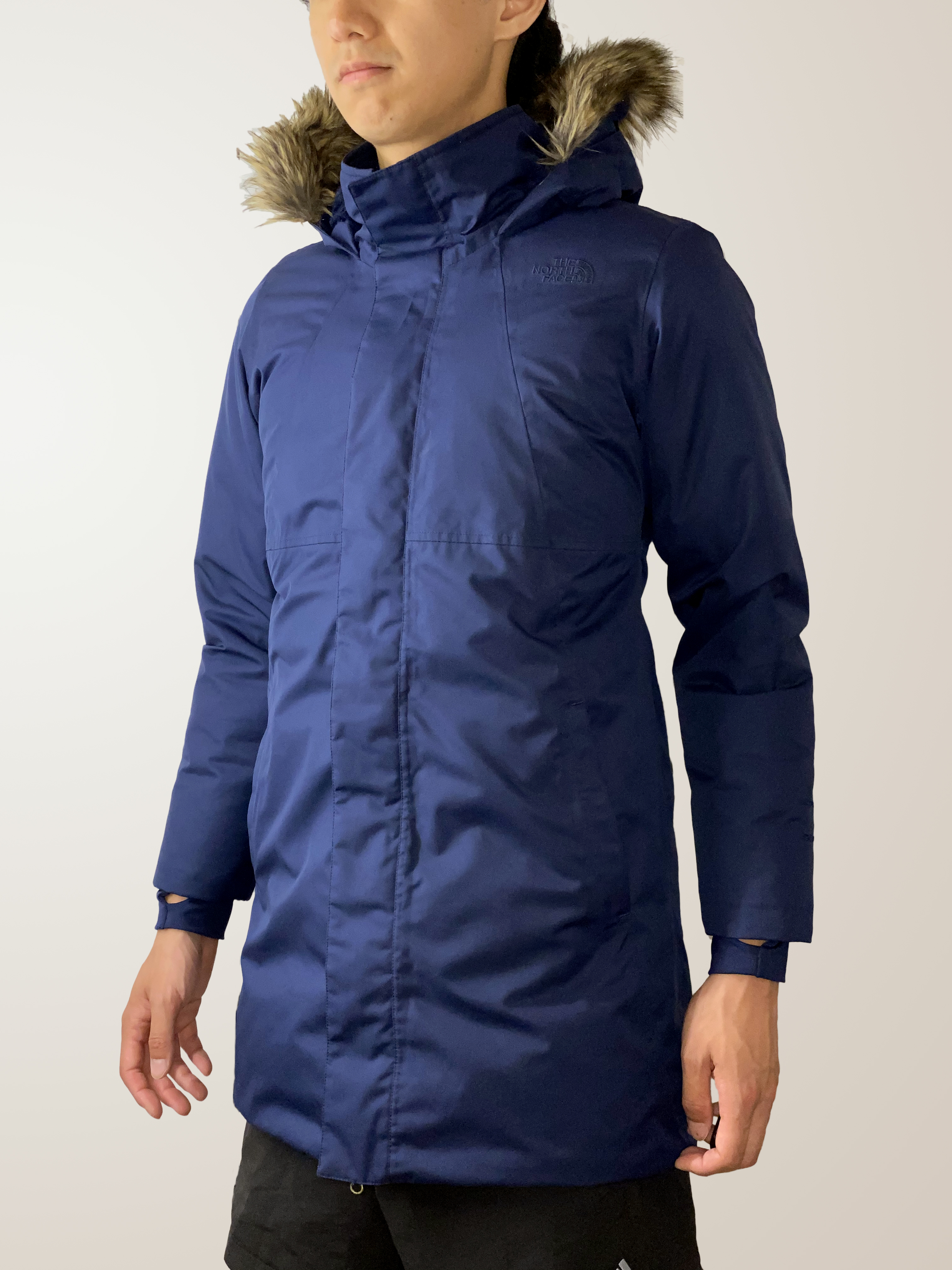
Parka: A hip-lengthed down jacket with a hood fur trim

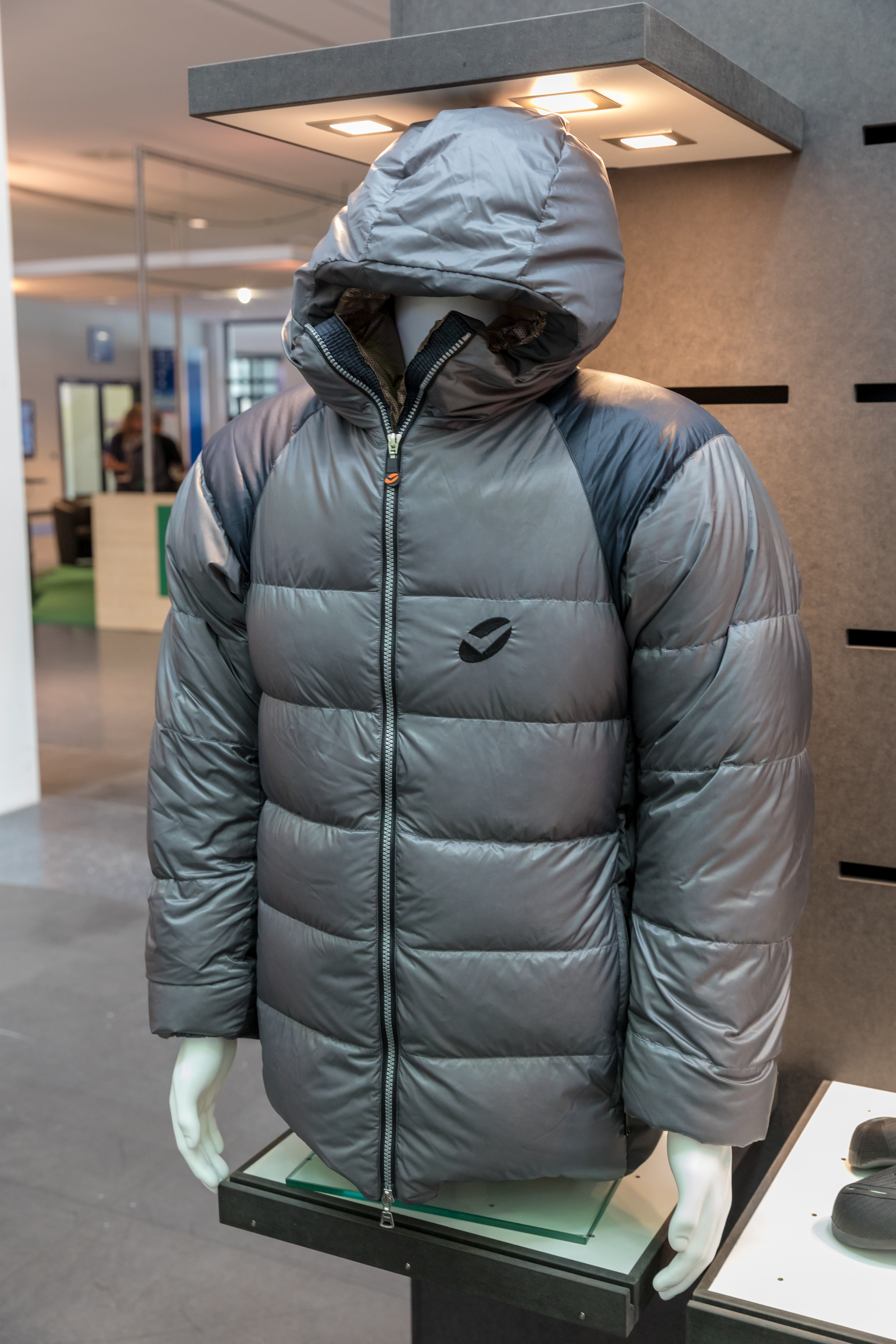
Hiking: A thick, padded grey jacket with a zip and hood with conventionally stitched quilts

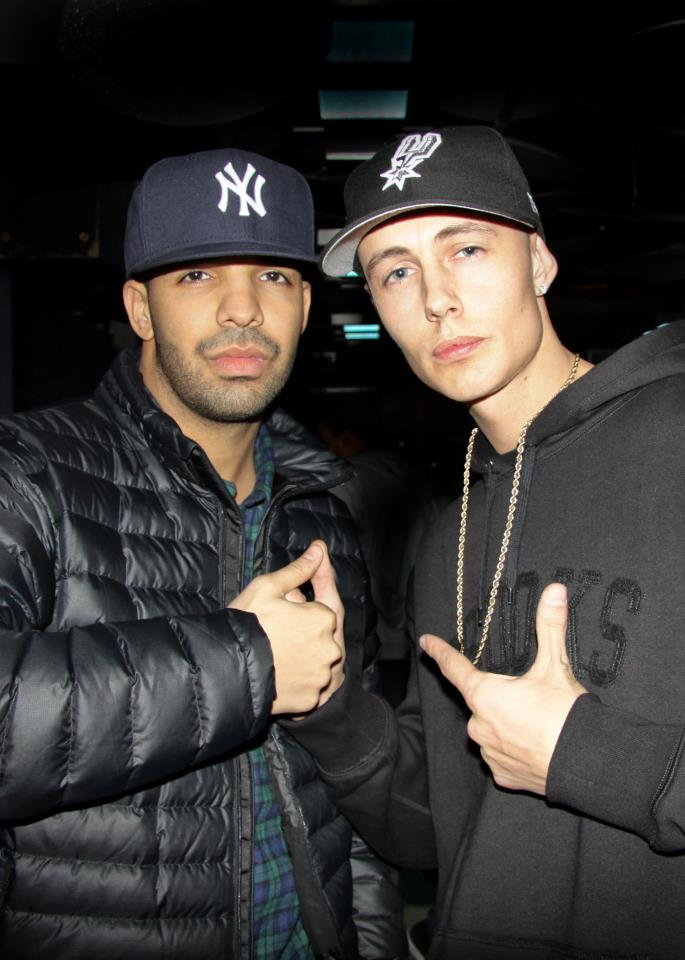
Ultralight/urban: Hip-hop artist Drake (left) wearing a thin down jacket

== See also ==
- Mountaineering equipment
- Trench coat
