= Global Pet Expo =

Annual trade show

- Members: Yes
- Website: www.globalpetexpo.org

The Global Pet Expo is an annual trade show in the United States presented by the American Pet Products Association and the Pet Industry Distributors Association.

The 2025 Show featured 1,000 exhibitors, 3,100 booths and more than 3,000 new product launches. Twenty thousand pet product buyers attended the show. Exhibitors include PetSmart, Petco and various other companies.
