= Tailored Brands =

American men's apparel company

Tailored Brands, Inc.
- Type: Private
- Industry: Retail
- Founded: 1973 (as Men's Wearhouse)
- Founder: George Zimmer
- Headquarters: Houston, Texas, U.S.
- Number of locations: 1,450 (Feb. 2020)
- Area served: United States; Canada
- Key people: John Tighe (CEO)
- Products: Men's clothing, footwear, tuxedo rentals and suit pressing
- Revenue: ▼US$ 2.881 billion (2019)
- Operating income: ▼US$ 97.84 million (2019)
- Net income: ▼US$−82.28 million (2019)
- Total assets: ▲US$ 2.219 billion (2019)
- Total equity: ▼US$−98.31 million (2019)
- Number of employees: 19,300 (Feb. 2020)
- Subsidiaries: Jos. A. Bank; Men's Wearhouse; Moores; K&G Fashion Superstore
- Website: www.tailoredbrands.com

Tailored Brands, Inc. is an American retail holding company for various men's apparel stores, including the Men's Wearhouse and Jos. A. Bank brands. The company is headquartered in Houston, Texas, with additional corporate offices in Dublin, California and New York, New York.

The company operates Men's Wearhouse, K&G Superstores (an off-price retail chain), Moores Clothing for Men (a Canadian chain of men's clothing stores), and Jos. A. Bank. In 2013, the company added the Joseph Abboud brand to its lineup.

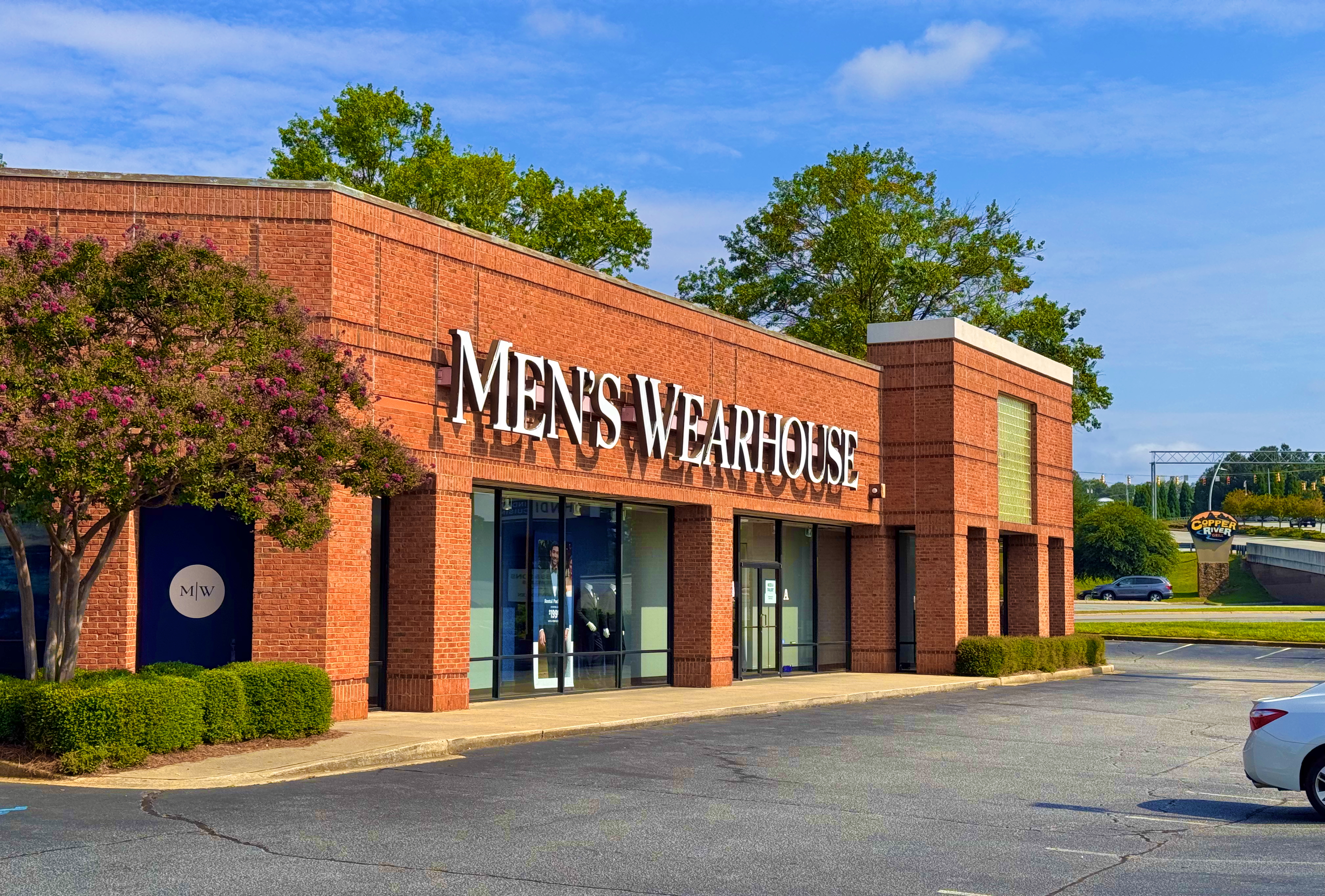
A Men's Wearhouse apparel store in Greenville, South Carolina

== History ==
=== 1946–2008: After Hours Formalwear ===
After Hours Formalwear
- Type: Division
- Industry: Retail
- Founded: 1946 (as Mitchell's Formalwear)
- Defunct: 2008
- Headquarters: Houston, Texas
- Number of locations: 450 stores in 31 states
- Products: Men's clothing and tuxedo rentals
- Parent: Men's Warehouse

After Hours Formalwear was a clothier that specialized in the renting of tuxedos and formal wear for men. Originally known as Mitchell's Formalwear and founded in 1946, After Hours was the result of the acquisition by Mitchell's of fellow clothiers Small's and Tuxedo World in the late 1990s, and later acquired and assimilated several other chains in the United States.

After Hours was acquired by May Department Stores in 2001, and became a part of Federated Department Stores following that company's buyout of May in 2005. It operated over 450 stores in 31 states and the District of Columbia. It was combined with David's Bridal when it was acquired by May, and during that time coordinated much of its inventory with David's Bridal.

On November 17, 2006, After Hours Formalwear was sold to Men's Wearhouse while David's Bridal was purchased, along with sister division Priscilla of Boston, by Leonard Green & Partners. The chain operated as MW Tux for a year, before being re-branded again as Men's Wearhouse & Tux. In late 2008, the MW Tux Brand was rolled up into the Men's Wearhouse brand, and ceased being an independent brand.

=== 1973–2016: Men's Wearhouse ===
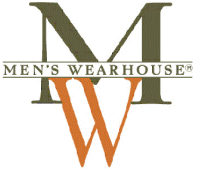
"You're gonna like the way you look. I guarantee it."

Tailored Brands' predecessor, Men's Wearhouse, was founded in 1973 by George Zimmer as a retail men's clothing store. The business had grown to 100 stores by the time it held an IPO in 1992, raising $13M. Zimmer turned Men's Wearhouse into an industry consolidator, acquiring numerous competitors throughout his tenure leading the firm. In 1997, it purchased, then liquidated, the bankrupt Kuppenheimer chain.

Men's Wearhouse notably ran television and radio commercials featuring Zimmer, and the oft-repeated slogan, "You're going to like the way you look; I guarantee it." According to Business Week, Men's Wearhouse targets the common man, with "the neatly displayed clothes in Zimmer's stores [being] designed to cater to the unpretentious guy who wants to do as little as possible to maintain his wardrobe."

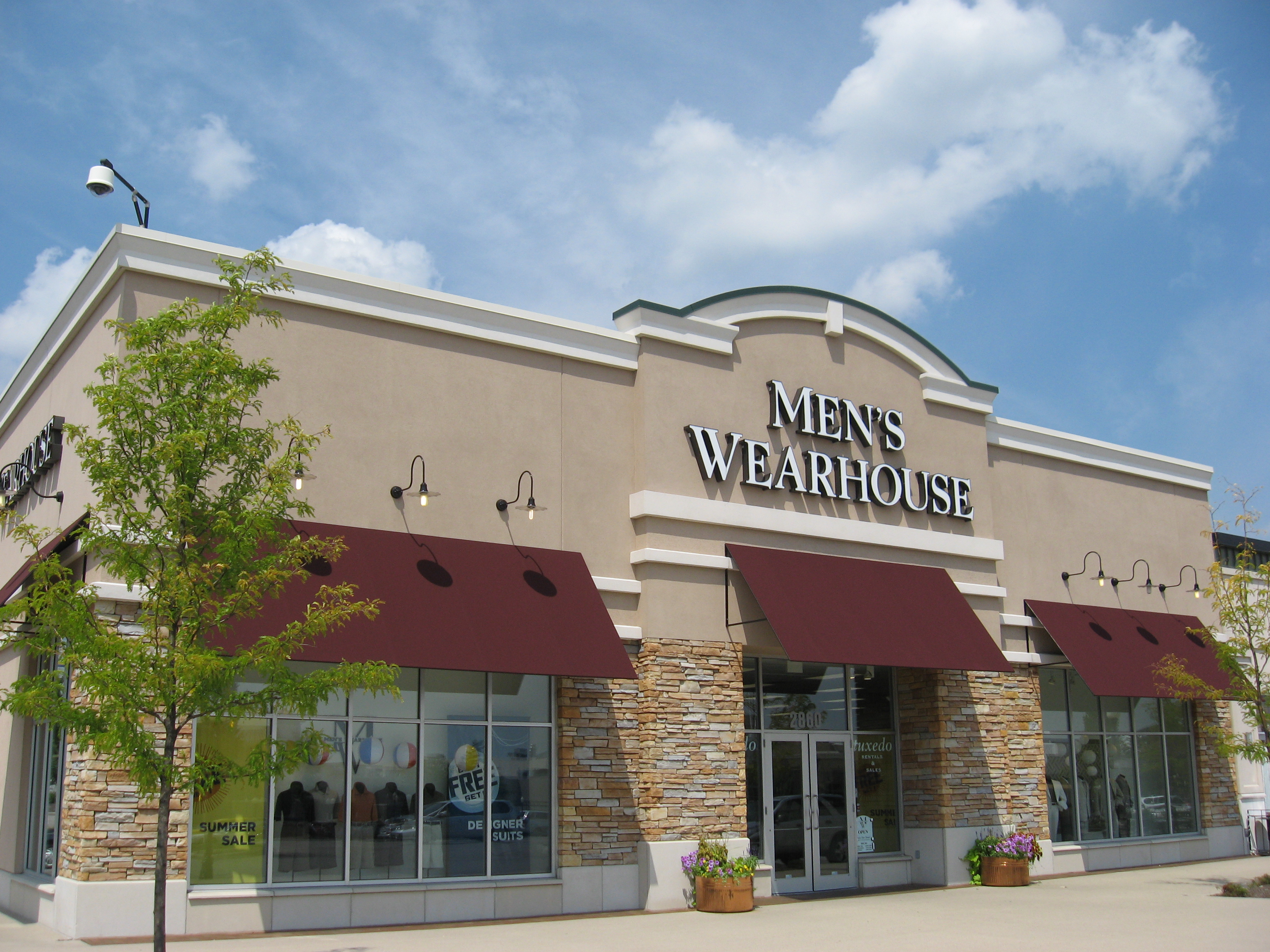
Men's Wearhouse in Miamisburg, Ohio

On November 17, 2006, Men's Wearhouse acquired After Hours Formalwear, a clothier specializing in black tie formalwear, from Federated Department Stores, the parent company of department store company Macy's. After Hours Formalwear was originally rebranded MW Tux, but has now been rolled up under the Men's Wearhouse brand. The formalwear group within Men's Wearhouse specializes in tuxedo rentals for men and boys for black tie events.

In 2009, Men's Wearhouse became a major sponsor of the United Football League and continued to sponsor the league in 2010. In that same year, the company acquired the trade and assets of Alexandra plc, which was in administration and Dimensions Corporatewear to develop its presence in Europe.

On June 19, 2013, the company dismissed founder and Executive Chairman George Zimmer for undisclosed reasons. The company later stated that Zimmer was dismissed due to "difficulty accepting the fact that Men's Wearhouse is a public company with an independent board of directors and that he has not been the chief executive officer for two years. He advocated for significant changes that would enable him to regain control."

==== 2013–2014: Acquisition of Jos. A. Bank ====
In October 2013, Men's Wearhouse received a $2.4 billion acquisition offer from smaller rival Jos. A. Bank. Men's Wearhouse countered with an offer of its own, which sparked a five-month takeover battle between the two menswear retailers. After Jos. A. Bank rejected the initial counteroffer, Men's Wearhouse announced that it would increase its all-cash bid if Jos. A. Bank revealed limited financial information and entered into negotiations. In an attempt to dilute shares and become too large for Men's Wearhouse to purchase, Jos. A. Bank agreed to acquire the men's outdoor clothing company Eddie Bauer for $825 million. Men's Wearhouse immediately responded by filing a lawsuit to block the proposed acquisition, which was expedited by Delaware Judge J. Travis Laster." The lawsuit required Jos. A. Bank to disclose documents relating to the deal and prevented it from closing the deal without giving Men's Wearhouse 10 days' notice.

On November 12, 2013, Ricky Sandler, CEO of Eminence Capital LLC, published a letter he sent to Men's Wearhouse CEO Douglas Ewert discussing a merger with Jos. A. Bank. On November 15, 2013, Joseph A. Bank Clothiers Inc. withdrew "its all-cash proposal to purchase Men's Wearhouse for $48 a share after its self-imposed November 14 deadline".

In March 2014, Men's Wearhouse reached an agreement to acquire Jos. A. Bank for $1.8 billion, on the condition that it dropped its acquisition bid for Eddie Bauer. A Federal Trade Commission investigation into the deal concluded in May 2014, concluding that the merger was "not likely to harm consumers"; the completion of this investigation was required for the merger to go forward.

=== 2016–Present: Tailored Brands ===
Tailored Brands, Inc. was created in January 2016 when Men's Wearhouse reorganized as a holding company and changed its ticker symbol from MW to TLRD. Tailored Brands filed for bankruptcy due to the coronavirus pandemic and its 1.4 billion dollar long term debt load on August 2, 2020, after announcing a few weeks earlier that they would close around 500 locations.

In June 2025, the company announced that John Tighe would succeed Peter Sachse as the new CEO beginning in August. Sachse transitioned to Executive Chairman.

In April 2026, Tailored Brands confidentially filed for an initial public offering with the SEC.
