= DeVito/Verdi =

American advertising company

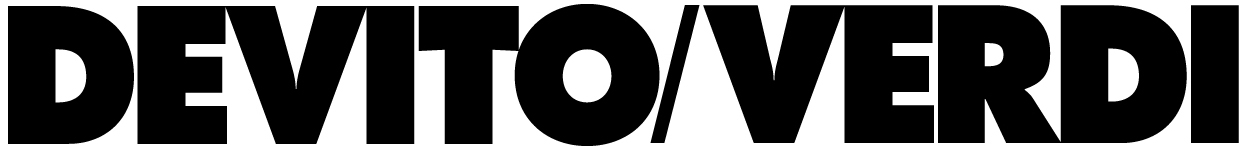
- Formerly: Follis & Verdi, Follis/DeVito/Verdi
- Company type: Private
- Industry: Advertising Agency
- Founded: 1988; 38 years ago, in New York City
- Founder: Ellis Verdi, John Follis and Sal DeVito
- Headquarters: New York, United States
- Key people: Ellis Verdi (president); Sal DeVito (Executive Creative Director)
- Services: Strategic/brand leadership, creative services, media planning/buying, production broadcast, print, digital, research, public relations, direct marketing, online/wireless, sales promotion, and design/collateral development.
- Website: devitoverdi.com

DeVito/Verdi is an American-based, full-service advertising and communications agency headquartered in New York City. The agency was formed in 1993 by partners Sal DeVito and Ellis Verdi following the departure of original partner and creative director, John Follis, who left Follis/DeVito/Verdi to start his new agency, Follis Inc.

== History ==
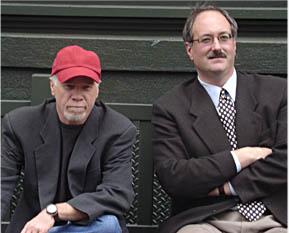
The firm is led by Sal DeVito, Executive Creative Director (left) and Ellis Verdi, President.

In 1988, Verdi and Follis opened Follis & Verdi and soon debuted its first campaign for Sorrell Ridge Fruit Spreads that received major national press and became a Harvard Business School case study. Three years later, Sal DeVito joined the firm as a second partner and creative director. The agency was renamed to Follis/DeVito/Verdi.

In July 1993, Follis left the firm citing philosophical differences. The firm was then renamed DeVito/Verdi.

In 1997, D/V received notoriety when the mayor of New York Rudy Giuliani ordered the removal of advertisements mentioning the mayor from the city busses.

In 1998, the company won an award as the best small creative agency for the fourth straight year. In 2000, the firm produced television commercials and other advertising for the United States Senate election in New York for Hillary Clinton. By the year 2001, the firm's annual billings reached an estimated $134 million and this would grow to over $220 million in 2006. Also in 2006, the New York City Office of Emergency Management contracted DeVito/Verdi to create advertisements to make city residents more aware of potential emergencies like floods, storms, and power loss. The agency formed a public relations division during the year.

In 2007, after a six-month review, the Sports Authority selected DeVito/Verdi to handle online, print, television, and radio advertising for the sports retailer.

In 2011, DeVito/Verdi opened their West Coast office in San Diego. Also that year, DeVito/Verdi won more awards than any other agency, with a total of 13 awards at the Racie Award Show with a sweep in the radio and magazine categories.

In June 2019, the agency moved from the Union Square area to the top floor of the Cadillac House in the SoHo area of the city. The building is the former home of the Cadillac division of General Motors.

The agency is media-agnostic and develops plans involving all agency disciplines.

An ad from the New York Magazine campaign.

On July 15, 2024, DeVito died from a sudden illness.

== Recognition ==
In 1993, Follis/DeVito/Verdi won nine ADDY Awards, making it the second most awarded agency in New York.

In 2010, DeVito/Verdi won the "Best of the Best Among All Ads" at the National Retail Federation (RACie) award show. The Ehrlich Pest Control radio spot that was competed against television and marketing communications from major retailers.

In 2003 and 2006, the agency won the grand prize at the Radio Mercury Awards for their radio ad for the National Thoroughbred Racing Association, and it has won the top award at both the Cannes and Clio awards ceremonies.

The 2006 International ANDY Awards recognized the ad agency, the Healthcare Advertising Awards, and The Outdoor Advertising Association of America competitions for its work for Mount Sinai Hospital. DeVito/Verdi's campaign for Mount Sinai took home the highest honors at the 23rd Annual Healthcare Advertising Awards in June 2009. The campaign was awarded the top prize in the Large Hospitals Group for three categories: Magazine, Billboard, and Radio. The agency won twice at the prestigious ANDY Awards for its out-of-home advertising and its entire print campaign to promote the hospital's services and stellar qualifications.

DeVito/Verdi has been named "Best Agency" six times over the last 12 years by the American Association of Advertising Agencies.

A poster by DeVito/Verdi used in a campaign for Premier Health Partners focusing on the opioid epidemic in the Dayton, Ohio area.

In July 2015, DeVito/Verdi won a silver Telly advertising award for a 30-second television spot lampooning greedy and uncaring bankers for the Nassau Educators Federal Credit Union.

In December 2015, the agency was awarded a single Gold Ingot at the Midas Awards for the world's best financial advertising. The award was for the agency's work with the Nassau Educators Federal Credit Union.

In October 2016, Devito/Verdi won 11 Hatch Awards for the print and television campaigns for the furniture retailer Bernie & Phyl's. The firm took home the top prize in the category for the best "Television Campaigns Under $50,000," and tied for the best in the "Regional TV Campaign" category, along with four silver, one bronze, and six merit awards.

In September 2017, two of DeVito/Verdi's radio ads for the National Thoroughbred Racing Association won the "Hall of Fame" awards at the 2017 Clio Awards show. The Hall of Fame selections are for "outstanding work from the past that has stood the test of time and cemented a place of honor and respect in the hearts and memories of consumers and advertising professionals alike".

== Notable Ads ==
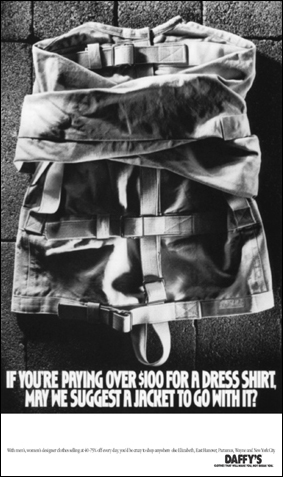
A piece from the campaign for Daffy's clothing.

Daffy's - 'DeVito/Verdi created a series of ads that told New Yorkers they'd be crazy to pay too much for clothes. One ad showed a picture of a straitjacket: "If you're paying over $100 for a dress shirt," the headline read, "may we suggest a jacket to go with it?"

New York Magazine - DeVito/Verdi's campaign for New York Magazine billed it as "Possibly the only good thing in New York Rudy hasn't taken credit for."

New York Resident Magazine - "In an age when ever-greater value is placed on the science of advertising, Devito/Verdi has remained committed to smart slogans and crisp concepts. With fiendishly clever phrases, highly evocative images and a high-impact sensibility, Devito/Verdi keeps to classic standards retains a classic comic sensibility in what has otherwise become a more uniformed world of glitzy show-and-tell."

Time Out Magazine - One of DeVito/Verdi's advertisements for Time Out Magazine read, "Our magazine is a lot like the average New Yorker; I'll tell you where you can go and what you can do with yourself.

Legal Sea Foods - During the 2016 United States presidential election, the East Coast restaurant chain Legal Sea Foods ran a campaign with their CEO Roger Berkowitz running a faux presidential bid. In one short television spot, the restaurant's CEO supports LGBT rights, by noting "that's why we serve rainbow trout". In another spot, Berkowitz declares, "If we build a wall on the border, who will eat our delicious fish tacos?"

In 2017, DeVito/Verdi produced a series of television commercials for Legal Sea Foods where fish and crustaceans lament by singing the blues about not being selected to be served by the restaurant chain.

Mount Sinai Health System - In a campaign that began in July 2015, Mount Sinai Health System ran print and television spots in the New York metropolitan area, showing how the organization is "changing the face of medicine." One of the 15-second TV spots shows a single mountaineer climbing a cliff with a voice-over, "The person who says it cannot be done should not interrupt the person who's doing it." The ad ends with black text, "Changing the face of medicine." And the final frames display Mount Sinai's logo and campaign tagline, "For you. For life."

A marijuana-themed print spot that was part of the marketing campaign dubbed "Welcome to Legal.

In 2018, DeVito/Verdi worked with Mount Sinai on a campaign to raise awareness about the clinical care and procedures available to New York residents. The health system also worked on a campaign with the United States Tennis Association focused on orthopedics and sports medicine.

Bernie & Phyl's - To reach younger consumers who usually avoid traditional media, furniture retailer Bernie & Phyl's hired DeVito/Verdi to come up with a poster campaign for commuters on Boston's subway system. The ads were designed to look like kinky or lewd classified personal ads, but use clever word play to capture the attention of smartphone focused commuters. In May 2017, some of the ads were removed from the MBTA's subway cars for being too sexually suggestive. Devito started a new campaign in August 2017, featuring the removed ads covered by a "Banned in Boston" banner explaining why the government agency pulled the advertisement.

In 2018, DeVito/Verdi helped to create a campaign for Premier Health Partners focusing on the opioid epidemic in the Dayton, Ohio area. The print advertisement showed an expensive smartphone, with a description of the features, and then moved on to a justification for stealing the phone and selling it to get enough opioids for the week before quitting. The tagline of the advertisement was "The world looks different when you're addicted to opioids".

During the spring of 2018, DeVito/Verdi started a marketing campaign to effect changes in patient behavior for BayCare Health System's patients about when to use telehealth, urgent care, the emergency room, or their Primary care physician. One billboard showed a bee and a beehive with the visual; of if a patient steps on a bee, then they should head to urgent care, but if they step on a beehive, then they should head for the emergency room.

During the late summer of 2019, Devito/Verdi created a cannabis themed campaign for Legal Sea Foods, headquartered in Massachusetts. This state legalized the recreational use of marijuana in 2016. The "Welcome to Legal" spots air on local television stations at 4:20 pm and are full of pot puns and psychedelic art fish arrangements. Examples of the slogans and puns included in the creative are; "Our fish are freshly baked," "Right now our fish are high... in Omega 3s," "Right now we're packing bowls... with clam chowder," and "Right now we're smoking... salmon".

== Notable clients ==
DeVito/Verdi has worked for clients such as Meijer, The National Association of Broadcasters, Sony, Canon, BMW, Circuit City, Daffy's, Esquire Magazine, TimeOut Magazine, Grey Goose Vodka, SteinMart, Reebok, Massachusetts General Hospital, Hotwire.com, Office Depot, Legal Sea Foods, The Herb Chambers Companies, Legal Sea Foods, Gildan Activewear, Fallon Community Health Plan, Gold Toe, Suffolk University, Pepsi/SOBE, Corazon Tequila, Gordmans, Empire Kosher Chicken, BevMo!, Acura, CarMax, Sports Authority, University of Chicago Medical Center, Laurel Road, and others.

- 7-Eleven
- Abington Memorial Hospital
- Appleton Rum
- BayCare Health System
- Bernie & Phyl's
- BevMo!
- BMW
- Canon
- Carvel
- Chipotle Mexican Grill
- Circuit City
- Duane Reade
- Erlich
- Fallon Community Health Plan
- Gardner-White Furniture
- Gildan
- Gold Toe
- Gordmans
- Grey Goose Vodka
- Herb Chambers Companies
- HBO
- Hotwire.com
- K&G
- Laurel Road
- Legal Sea Foods
- Lincoln Educational Services Corporation
- Linens 'n Things
- Massachusetts General Hospital
- Meijer
- Men's Wearhouse
- Moores
- Mount Sinai Medical Center
- MW Tux
- National Congress of American Indians
- NEFCU Credit Union
- New York Institute of Technology
- North Shore LIJ
- Office Depot
- People Magazine
- Pepsi/SoBe
- Premier Health Partners
- Rentokil
- Sony
- Sports Authority
- Suffolk University
- Tribe Hummus
- University of Chicago Medical Center
- Virginia Commonwealth University Medical Center
