= Bacon jam =

Bacon-based relish

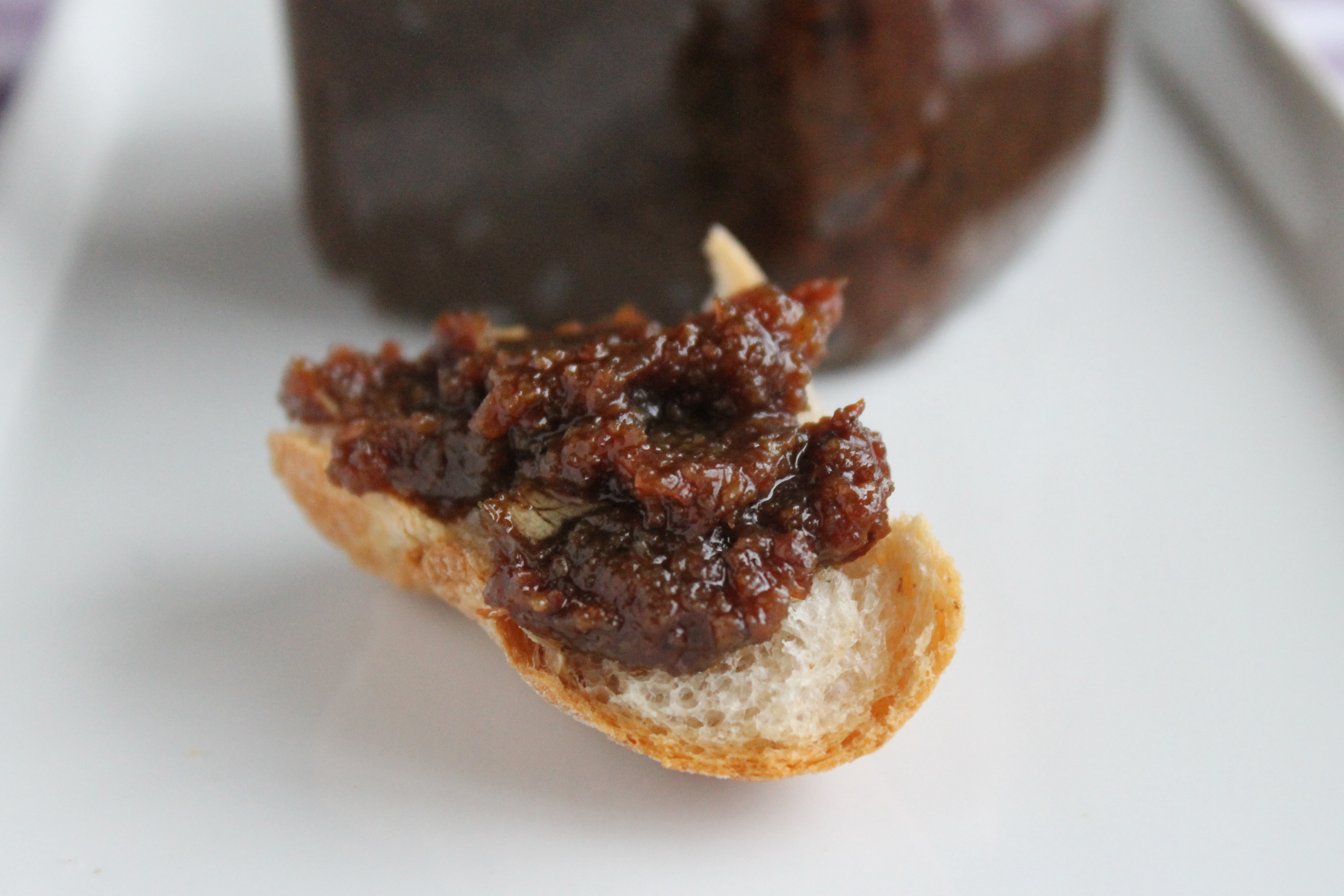
- Course: Condiment
- Main ingredients: Bacon

Bacon jam is a bacon-based relish made from cooked, drained chopped bacon which is slow cooked with onions, vinegar, and brown sugar. Part of bacon mania, it was invented as condiment for hamburgers in 2007, and is now served on many other foods, including as a spread for bread or toast.

Many spiced and flavored variations are now available.

== History ==
Josh Henderson of Skillet Street Foods in Seattle created bacon jam for his food trucks and has been selling it since at least 2007. His recipe was inspired by the garnish for the hamburgers at Sang Yoon's gastropub Father's Office, which includes caramelized onions and "bacon compote"; Henderson says he spent four years refining his bacon jam recipe, emphasizing the pork flavors over the onion. He serves it as a "special sauce" on the hamburgers on his food trucks. Henderson also sold bacon jam in jars, and in 2008, it was sold through Martha Stewart's and Real Simple's holiday gift guides. Others have started producing it since.

In 2013, Bruce Kramer introduced the chef Michael Oraschewsky to bacon jam, and Oraschewsky started serving it at his restaurant. They launched a campaign on Kickstarter to raise money for a business, The Bacon Jams, which produced and sold the product. In 2014, they were approached by QVC to sell it online. This required that they produce a shelf-stable version in quantity and have it approved by the USDA. They sold 60,000 jars of bacon jam in 6 minutes on QVC. The company rebranded itself as TBJ Gourmet in 2016. By 2017, their product was sold in 1500 retail locations and nearly 1000 restaurants, and by 2022, it achieved mass distribution to the food industry through Sysco. By 2026, it was also distributed by US Foods and KeHE.

National restaurant chains started offering bacon jam in the 2020s, often as limited-time promotions: Sonic and Red Robin in 2021; Denny's in 2023 and 2024; Dairy Queen and Burger King in 2024; Applebee's in 2025; and Dunkin' Donuts in 2025. By 2024, it was also sold in thousands of supermarkets.

Besides TBJ, many other brands now offer bacon jam, including Stonewall Kitchen.

== Preparation ==
Bacon jam is made by cooking chopped bacon, draining most of the grease, then slow cooking it with diced onions, brown sugar, balsamic vinegar, salt, and black pepper. Garlic, maple syrup, and other vinegars are also common ingredients. Less frequently used ingredients include bourbon whiskey, brewed coffee, thyme, and salt. Bacon jam is not a smooth jam, but has chunks of bacon and other ingredients in a sticky glaze; some cooks make it smoother in a food processor. Commercial bacon jam tends to be smoother than home-made.

The original Skillet Street version contains 36% protein and fat from bacon and 11% sugar. Other commercially packaged products may contain trace-17% protein and fat from the bacon and 35–66% sugar. Recipes on the web have 4–6 times as much raw bacon by weight as sugar; since cooked bacon is about 30% the weight of raw, bacon jam has about 1.2–1.8 times as much bacon as sugar.

== Shelf life ==
Unlike fruit jams, the original bacon jam could not be stored at room temperature, or made shelf-stable by home canning, even if vinegar or sugar were added. It can be held in a refrigerator for 2–4 weeks, or frozen. Foodborne illness from bacon jam has been traced to inadequate refrigeration.

Commercial bacon jam is formulated and processed to be shelf-stable until it is opened.

== Similar products ==
There are many spreadable pork products vaguely similar to bacon jam: Italian (Calabria) 'nduja, Austrian (Styria) verhackert, German mettwurst and teewurst. These are cured or raw products, not cooked like bacon jam. French (Touraine) rillettes are a shredded confit which can be made of pork and salt, but are not otherwise seasoned; Balzac once called them "brune confiture" 'brown jam'. None of these products use crisped meat, none are sweetened, and none are used as condiments – rather, they are eaten as charcuterie with bread.

== See also ==
- List of spreads
