= Ellis Verdi =

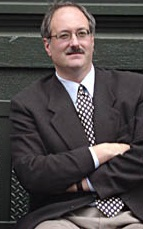
- Born: December 11, 1955 (age 70)
- Education: Brandeis University
- Years active: 1978 - Present
- Spouse: Marcy

Ellis Verdi (born December 11, 1955) is an American marketing and advertising executive based in New York City, New York. He is the founder, along with Sal DeVito of the DeVito/Verdi advertising agency.

== Early years ==
Verdi was born at Mount Sinai Hospital in New York City's East Harlem neighborhood and grew up in Switzerland and France until he was teenager and then moved back to New York and attended the Louis D. Brandeis High School on the Upper West Side of Manhattan. He graduated from high school in 1973. Later that year, he attended Brandeis University in Waltham, Massachusetts where he majored in political science. While in college he was known for keeping tropical fish tanks stocked with small piranhas and screening first-run movies on campus.

== Career ==
After graduating from Brandeis in 1977, Verdi planned on going to law school and moved back to New York where he progressed through a series of sort-term and unfulfilling jobs. His first advertising position was with SSC&B as an assistant media planner.

In 1978 Verdi moved to the firm C&W and worked on Procter & Gamble's Folgers coffee accounts. In 1980 he became a brand manager for American Home Products. In 1982 Verdi became a product manager for PepsiCo working on the different diet brands and Mountain Dew accounts. In 1984, Verdi became vice president of account management for the Grey Group where he stayed for four years.

== DeVito/Verdi ==
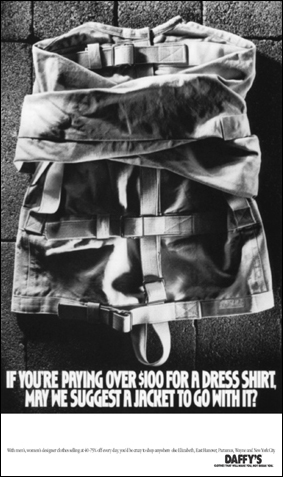
A piece from the campaign for Daffy's clothing.

In 1989 the agency was launched as Ellis Verdi & Partners, as a one-man operation in the living room of his apartment making over 100 cold calls each day. Later, the firm partnered with a creative director John Follis and the name was changed to Follis & Verdi. Their first client was a fruit spread company named Allied Old English, who wanted an aggressive advertising firm.

In 1991, DeVito, an industry veteran and onetime matchbook designer, joined the firm as a second partner and creative director and the agency's name becomes Follis/DeVito/Verdi.

=== 1990s ===
In the fall of 1991, Verdi came under criticism for running a print ad for a discount clothier named Daffy's that showed an image of a Straitjacket with the tagline: "If you're paying over $100 for a dress shirt, may we suggest a jacket to go with it?" Groups in New York City, where the ad ran, petitioned the city's Commission on Human Rights to treat the ad as a bias case. The advertisement was reviewed by the American Association of Advertising Agencies and they concluded that Verdi's agency did not knowingly offend anyone.

In July 1993, Follis left the firm citing philosophical differences, and opened his own New York agency, now known as Follis Advertising. In 1993, the firm was renamed DeVito/Verdi.

During the first years of the agency, Verdi worked in his home living room and made more than 100 cold calls a day and ended up being hired by the South Street Seaport as well as Solgar Vitamins.

In the 1990s, Verdi was credited with coining the marketing term, "top-of-mind awareness".

In 1993, DeVito/Verdi won the CarMax account and Verdi helped to create a national retail brand for this chain of used automobile dealers. The agency was hired even before the first location opened and Verdi executed the campaign and additional television advertisements over the course of a number of years in support of the launch and the initial wave of stores.

In 1999 Verdi was hired, without any previous political experience, to do the advertising for the Hillary Clinton 2000 United States Senate election for New York. The agency produced a series of ads that showed the candidate with a number of "firsts", "Not just the first lady."

=== 2000s ===
During the Dot-com bubble in early 2000, Verdi work with online college textbook seller, ecampus.com on a marketing campaign for Super Bowl XXXIV, often referred to as the "Dot-com Super Bowl". In the Wired article, Verdi was asked, “Will this dot-com ad rush end anytime soon?” and he replied, “I think we'll see the bubble burst. Advertising works, but it doesn't work that well.”

By 2001, the agency had approximately $134 million in ad billings and 64 employees. The firm was voted the best small advertising agency and one of three finalists for best mid-sized firm.

Since the firm's beginning, the staff devoted 15 percent of their time to pro bono work.

In 2009, Verdi was behind the Duane Reade series of outdoor, radio, and print advertisements that were inside jokes to fellow New Yorkers and to view the ambiguous drugstores as a hometown favorite. An example was: “Get everything you need in 15 minutes. Or as New Yorkers call it, lunch hour.”

=== 2010s ===
In October 2016, Ellis' firm won eleven television and print Hatch Awards for using vintage stock film from old black and white movies with dubbed and updated dialogue to pitch a furniture retailer, Bernie & Phyl's.

=== 2020s ===
In January 2020, in an interview with The New York Times, Verdi said about the advertising environment in the United States before the 2020 United States presidential election as "more scary than exciting". He continued with the analysis, "Even free expression is a challenge right now. People are holding their hands over their eyes and ears a little bit. This is not the moment for advertisers to take risks."
