= Dr. Miracle's =

Brand of personal care products

Dr. Miracle's is a line of ethnic personal care products.

== History ==
Founded in 2004 by Brian K Marks also founder of African Pride haircare, the brand focused its early products on ethnic hair care and later extended their production into skincare specific to African Americans. The brand is sold at major retail outlets such as Target, Wal-Mart, Kmart, as well as Sally’s Beauty Supply, CVS, Walgreens, Duane Reade and Rite Aid. In July 2010, the company held a promotional event at a Manhattan hotel for a new line of hair follicle products.

== Skin Care ==
Four years after the launch, Dr. Miracle’s added a skin care line to their product assortment. My Goodbye Acne System was the first in the company's skin care line up, complete with a cleanser, toner and lotion. The skin care line later expanded with My Miracle to include a daily mask, toner, cleanser, day moisturizer and anti-aging night moisturizer. The new skin line targeted popular dilemmas of African American women, proposing solutions for dryness, blemishes and aging. Raani Corp., a manufacturer of health-care items, over-the-counter pharmaceuticals and household and salon products, employs 150 workers, of which nearly half are temporary day workers. The company was previously inspected by OSHA in 1993, resulting in five serious violations. Raani Corp. has 15 business days from receipt of its current citations and penalties to comply, request an informal conference with OSHA's area director or contest the findings before the independent Occupational Safety and Health Review Commission.

== Awards ==
2005 Brooklyn Bureau of Community Service Partner in Industry Award, (“For leadership and commitment in providing employment opportunities for individuals with disabilities.”)

2006 Sally’s Beauty Vendor of the Year Award Hair & Scalp Treatment Conditioner)
