= Sal DeVito =

American advertising executive (1947–2024)

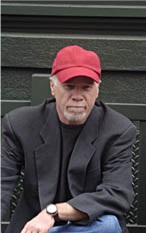
- Born: Salvatore DeVito; 16 July 1947; Brooklyn, NY
- Died: 15 July 2024 (age 76)
- Education: School of Visual Arts
- Occupation: Advertising executive
- Children: John DeVito

Sal DeVito (July 16, 1947 – July 15, 2024) was an American marketing and advertising executive based in New York City, New York. He was a partner, with Ellis Verdi, in DeVito/Verdi.

== Early years and education ==
DeVito was born and grew up in Brooklyn, New York and later attended State University of New York at Farmingdale (SUNY Farmingdale), majoring in advertising art. He later graduated from the School of Visual Arts in 1971.

== Career ==
DeVito's first job was designing matchbook covers for the firm of Conahay & Lion.

In the early 1970s, DeVito was hired by the Ted Bates advertising agency, but was laid off during the 1973–75 recession and worked at a gas station on Long Island pumping gas at a Texaco station for $2 an hour for eight months before getting hired by Ketchum Advertising.

During the late 1970s to the early 1980s DeVito worked for Young & Rubicam; Wells Rich Greene; Slater Hanft Martin; Penchina Selkowitz; Chiat/Day/New York, and HDM Worldwide where he won a Cannes Gold for Peugeot.

DeVito taught advertising concept courses at the School of Visual Arts (SVA) in New York for almost 3 decades. DeVito would often have students tape their spec ads to the walls of the classroom for review and grading. If a particular ad disgusted him, he would set the work on fire with his lighter. Some of the students DeVito taught ended up helping to start the DeVito/Verdi agency.

From the middle to late 1980s, DeVito was the Associate Creative Director for the creative agency Levine Huntley Schmidt Plapler and Beaver in New York.

== DeVito/Verdi ==
In 1988, three years before DeVito joined, Follis & Verdi was founded by creative director John Follis and Ellis Verdi. In March 1991, DeVito left the closing Levine, Huntley, Schmidt, & Beaver to join Follis&Verdi as a partner and second creative director changing the agency name to Follis/DeVito/Verdi (FDV). In the early 1990s FDV reached $17 million in billings revenue and had sixteen employees. In July 1993, Follis left the firm, citing philosophical differences, to open Follis Advertising. In 1993, the firm is renamed DeVito/Verdi.

Since the firm's beginning, the staff devoted 15 percent of their time to pro bono work.

In 1997, DeVito created a bus advertisement for New York magazine saying, "possibly the only good thing in New York that Rudy hasn’t taken credit for."

In 2000, Hillary Clinton hired DeVito to create radio, TV, and print advertisements for her senatorial campaign in 2000.

By 2001, the agency had approximately $134 million in ad billings and 64 employees. The firm was voted the best small advertising agency and one of three finalists for best mid-sized firm.

In 2002, DeVito was awarded a Clio Award in the Public Service category for the American Civil Liberties Union urging prison reform.

In 2004, DeVito won numerous awards for his radio spot, "Golf" for the National Thoroughbred Racing Association. The spot won the Art Directors Annual Award 2004 (Gold) for Radio Advertising, the One Show 2004 (Gold) for Consumer Radio, the American Advertising Awards ADDY 2004 (Gold) for Regional/National campaign, and the London International Advertising Awards 2004 (Winner) for radio.

In 2007, DeVito created a $3 million television, radio, print, and poster campaign for Legal Sea Foods restaurants using humor to make the point of the freshness of their seafood. The pun filled advertisements offered headlines like "Right about now your dinner is having breakfast" and "A seafood restaurant so exclusive, 9 out of 10 fish can’t get in."

In 2015, DeVito worked again with Legal Sea Foods on a satirical proselytizing broadcast and print campaign extolling the virtues of a fictitious religion, called Pescatarianism. The campaign even created a mock website to continue the message online.

Sal DeVito died on July 15, 2024, one day before his 77th birthday.
