= Skillet (restaurant) =

Restaurant chain based in Seattle, Washington, U.S.

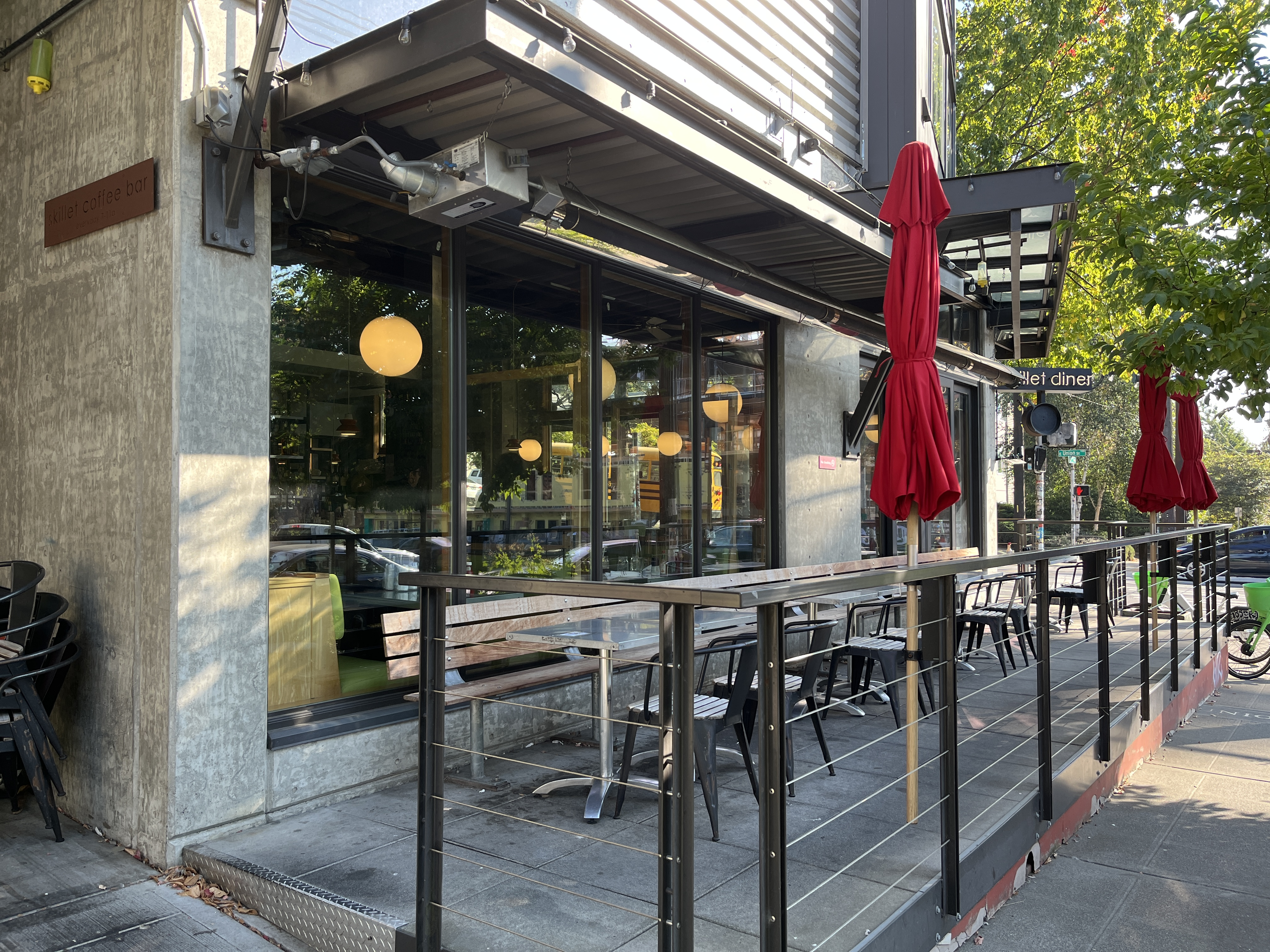
- Exterior of the Capitol Hill restaurant, 2022

Restaurant information
- Food type: New American
- Location: Seattle, Washington, United States
- Website: skilletfood.com

Skillet (formerly Skillet Street Food) is a restaurant chain in the Seattle area. Originally launched as a gourmet burger van that was known for its bacon jam, it was described in 2011 as a restaurant on wheels. In 2011, it also opened a diner in Seattle.

The company's founder sold the business in 2013. Skillet closed its food trucks during the COVID-19 pandemic in 2020, but continues to operate at five locations (full restaurant service at Capitol Hill and Post Alley, full and counter service at SeaTac Airport, and counter service at Seattle Center and Skillet Regrade on 6th Avenue) as of 2024.

== History ==
Skillet was listed in the Details magazine list of America's top portable kitchens in 2011 and was well known for its bacon jam in 2009, which it also sold and shipped by mail order for home consumption. To create the consistency required for the jam, creator Josh Henderson focused on the bacon fat and the reduced down vinegar and onion by cooking it together in one pot, which required regular skimming. A review by The Takeout in 2011 said "the grilled cheese with bacon jam was the best-received Taste Test item in the feature's storied history." Henderson sold the business in 2013.

In 2023, the company agreed to pay about $325,000 to settle allegations of wage theft, improper firings, failure to give employees breaks and sick leave, and making misleading statements saying that all service charges were given to workers.

== See also ==
- List of New American restaurants
- List of restaurant chains in the United States
