= Duane Reade =

American pharmacy and convenience store chain

Coordinates: 40.7070°N 74.0099°W

Duane Reade Inc.

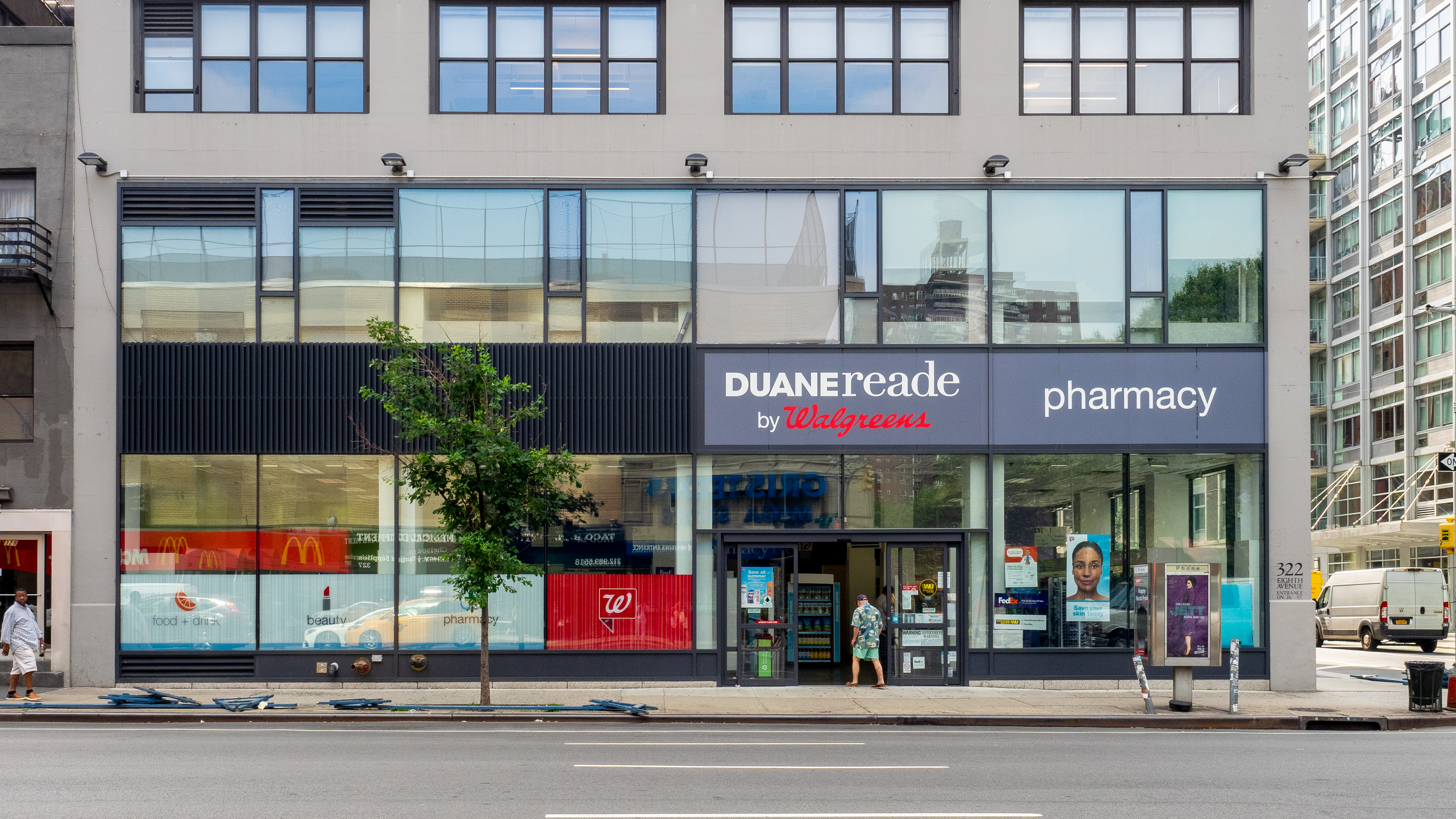
- Store in Chelsea, Manhattan
- Type: Subsidiary
- Industry: Retail
- Founded: 1960; 66 years ago, in New York, New York, U.S.
- Founders: Abraham Cohen; Eli Cohen; Jack Cohen
- Headquarters: 40 Wall Street, New York, New York, U.S.
- Area served: New York metropolitan area
- Key people: Gregory Wasson (former president & CEO)
- Services: Pharmacy
- Revenue: ▲US$1.58 billion (2006)
- Owner: Sycamore Partners
- Parent: Walgreens
- Website: www.walgreens.com/topic/duane-reade/duane-reade.jsp

Duane Reade Inc. (/dweɪn ˈriːd/ dwayn REED) is a chain of pharmacy and convenience stores owned by Walgreens. Its stores are primarily in New York (metropolitan New York City and Nassau, Suffolk, Westchester, Rockland, and Fairfield counties) in addition to in New Jersey. They are known for high-volume and small store layouts in densely populated Manhattan locations. In 2012, the company headquarters moved to 40 Wall Street in Lower Manhattan, which is the location of its newest flagship store.

== History ==
Founded in 1960, the chain was started with three stores by Abraham, Eli, and Jack Cohen with a warehouse located between Duane Street and Reade Street on Broadway in Lower Manhattan. Duane Reade takes its name from the company's first successful full-service drugstore, which opened in 1960 on Broadway between Duane and Reade Streets in Tribeca, just north of the Financial District. The streets themselves were named after early American politicians, James Duane (1733–1797) and Joseph Reade (1694–1771).

The Cohen family sold Duane Reade to Bain Capital in 1992 for a reported $239 million. Bain Capital in 1997 then sold the majority ownership of the chain to Donaldson, Lufkin & Jenrette. Duane Reade completed its initial public offering (IPO) on February 10, 1998, trading on the New York Stock Exchange under the ticker symbol DRD. On August 2, 2004, the company announced that it was acquired by Oak Hill Capital Partners and was again a private company.

Gary Charboneau, the company's senior vice president of sales and marketing since 1993, explained his store layout strategy in New York magazine in 2005. He designed each store using four sections: one for beauty and cosmetic products, another that serves as a pharmacy, a third section for seasonal products such as cards and candy, and a fourth part for household and grocery items. Cosmetic items were placed near store entrances, pharmacy sections were moved to the rear of stores since—according to Charboneau—"people don’t browse for prescriptions", and the other two sections occupied the remaining space. Ian Mount wrote in the magazine article, "half of Duane Reade’s sales come from food, cosmetics, and the like."

Under CEO Anthony Cuti, who had been the president of Pathmark, the store expanded from 59 stores in 1996 to 249 stores in May 2005, with more stores in New York City than any other drugstore chain. In September 1998, Duane Reade acquired Rock Bottom Stores Inc, another drug retail chain with 38 retail stores, for $30 million plus an additional $31 million for the store's inventories. While sales for Duane Reade rose from $1.14 billion in 2001 fiscal year to $1.38 billion in 2003, the combined impact of union disputes, a local recession, and the destruction of their best-performing store in the September 11 attacks forced the company to slow its expansion from 30 new stores a year in 2001 and 2002 to no more than 17 a year in 2003 and 2004. Despite its expansion, the company had long-term debts of $405 million by October 2008, losing $33.1 million in the first half of that year. Almost all of its stores are located in New York City or the immediate suburbs.

On April 19, 2006, it was announced that after nearly five years, Duane Reade agreed to settle with Disabled In Action to make all of its stores ADA compliant. According to the New York Daily News, Duane Reade estimated it would take two years to inspect and revamp its stores for wheelchair access. In November 2008, Duane Reade began rolling out a new logo. In April 2009, Duane Reade hired DeVito/Verdi as its lead advertising agency.

On April 9, 2010, Duane Reade was acquired by the Walgreen Company for $1.075 billion, consisting of $618 million in cash and $427 million of assumed debt. The transaction includes Duane Reade corporate office, 257 stores, and two distribution centers. On July 6, 2011, Duane Reade opened a location at 40 Wall Street in Lower Manhattan.

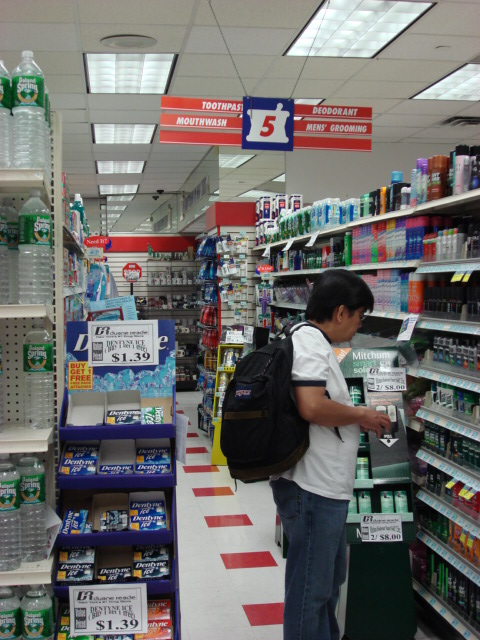
A shopper in an aisle at a Duane Reade store in Manhattan's Penn Station, June 2007

== Litigation and disputes ==
Duane Reade and its executives have been involved in various disputes over its business practices with federal and local governments and labor unions.

Two unions and Duane Reade Inc. struck a deal on April 11, 2006, to close a five-year contract dispute. The three-year agreement covers "all of Duane Reade's clerks, cashiers, pharmacy clerks, pharmacy technicians, and photo technicians", and it closes a dispute dating from September 2001, when their previous contract expired. As part of the deal, Duane Reade and the unions settled all outstanding union and company claims before the National Labor Relations Board.

In November 1997, the company settled charges that it sold drugs and other products in its New Jersey stores that were expired or overpriced. It agreed to pay $200,000 in civil penalties, investigative costs, and fees and to comply with the state's laws and regulations but did not admit wrongdoing.

Its embattled CEO Anthony Cuti, along with former CFO William Tennant, were indicted on October 9, 2008, in Manhattan federal court for falsely reporting company income and conspiring to commit securities fraud from December 2000 to June 2005. Cuti had already been replaced in November 2005 by industry veteran Richard Dreiling, COO of Longs Drugs stores based in the San Francisco area. In June 2010, Cuti and Tennant were convicted of securities fraud between November 2000 and June 2005. They faced up to 20 years in prison. Cuti was sentenced to three years in prison on November 15, 2010; Tennant was sentenced in September 2011 to time served, supervised release for three years, and a $10,000 fine.
