= Stonewall Kitchen =

American food producer

Coordinates: 43°9′17.1″N 70°39′25.8″W

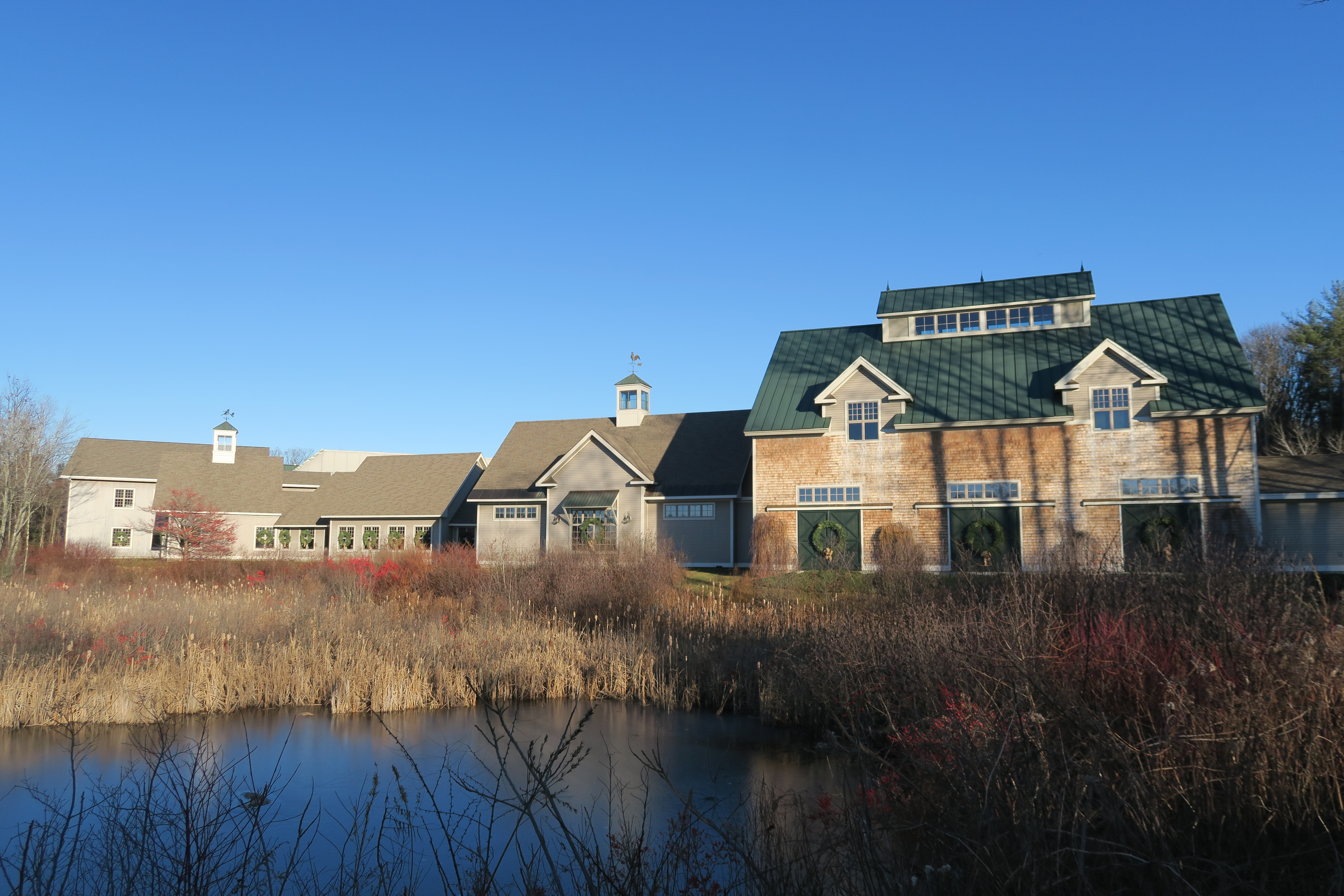
- Company Store in York, Maine
- Industry: Specialty food producer
- Founded: 1991; 35 years ago
- Founders: Jonathan King; Jim Stott
- Headquarters: York, Maine, United States
- Owner: Independent (1991–2014); Centre Partners (2014-2019); Audax Private Equity (2019–22); TA Associates (2022–present)
- Website: www.stonewallkitchen.com

Stonewall Kitchen is a specialty food producer based in York, Maine, United States. The company was founded as a homemade products stall at a local farmers market in 1991 and today sells in 42 countries. They make items such as jam, chutney, jellies, grill sauce, cooking oil and mustard.

On March 14, 2022, the company was acquired by TA Associates.

== History ==
Founders Jonathan King and Jim Stott started their business as a homemade products stall at the local farmers market. They worked from a small folding table and called themselves Stonewall Kitchen.

Stonewall Kitchen expanded their product line to include vinegars, oils, pesto, jams and baked goods. After selling at multiple venues, the operation branched out into selling wholesale.

In 1993, Crate & Barrel approached them for 2,500 jars of their Orange Cranberry Marmalade. The order was filled but it took a month to do it. To increase production capacity, they purchased and renovated an eighteenth-century barn in Kittery, Maine, then moved again to a larger property in nearby York, Maine.

The owners attended the Fancy Food Show in New York City, gaining the Outstanding Preserve award for their Roasted Garlic Onion Jam. They also earned a second award, for Outstanding Product Line.

By 1999, Stonewall Kitchen moved production to another larger facility. A visitors area was added to this facility in 2003. Another expansion took place in 2006 when a Cooking School was added to the York facility. In April 2021, Stonewall Kitchen acquired Vermont Coffee Company.

In 2014, private equity firm, Centre Partners became an investor (with an undisclosed amount of ownership) in Stonewall and brought in John Stiker as CEO. In 2019, the company was purchased by Audax Private Equity from Centre Partners. On March 14, 2022, TA Associates acquired Stonewall Kitchen.

Stonewall Kitchen holds 11 specialty food and home goods brands. This includes the Stonewall Kitchen brand; the Michel Design Works brand of personal and home care products; the Vermont Coffee Company brand; the Urban Accents brand of spice mixes, seasonings, and sauces; the Village Candle brand of fragranced candles, gifts and accessories; the Tillen Farms brand of pickled vegetables and cocktail cherries; the Napa Valley Naturals brand of olive oils, culinary oils, balsamic vinegars and wine vinegars; the Montebello brand of pasta; the Vermont Village brand of apple sauce and apple cider vinegars; and the Legal Sea Foods brand of seafood sauces and condiments.

== Products ==
Stonewall Kitchen is known for jams. Their product line also includes grille sauces, mustards, chutneys, pancake mixes and dessert sauces, as well as kitchen tools, place settings and home decor items.

In 2006, Stonewall Kitchen launched the Barefoot Contessa Pantry line in conjunction with chef Ina Garten, host of Barefoot Contessa on Food Network. This partnership ended in 2011.

In May 2018, Stonewall Kitchen agreed to a licensing agreement with Legal Sea Foods to launch a line of specialty seafood sauces and marinades throughout the United States.
