= Seasonal packaging =

Marketing strategy

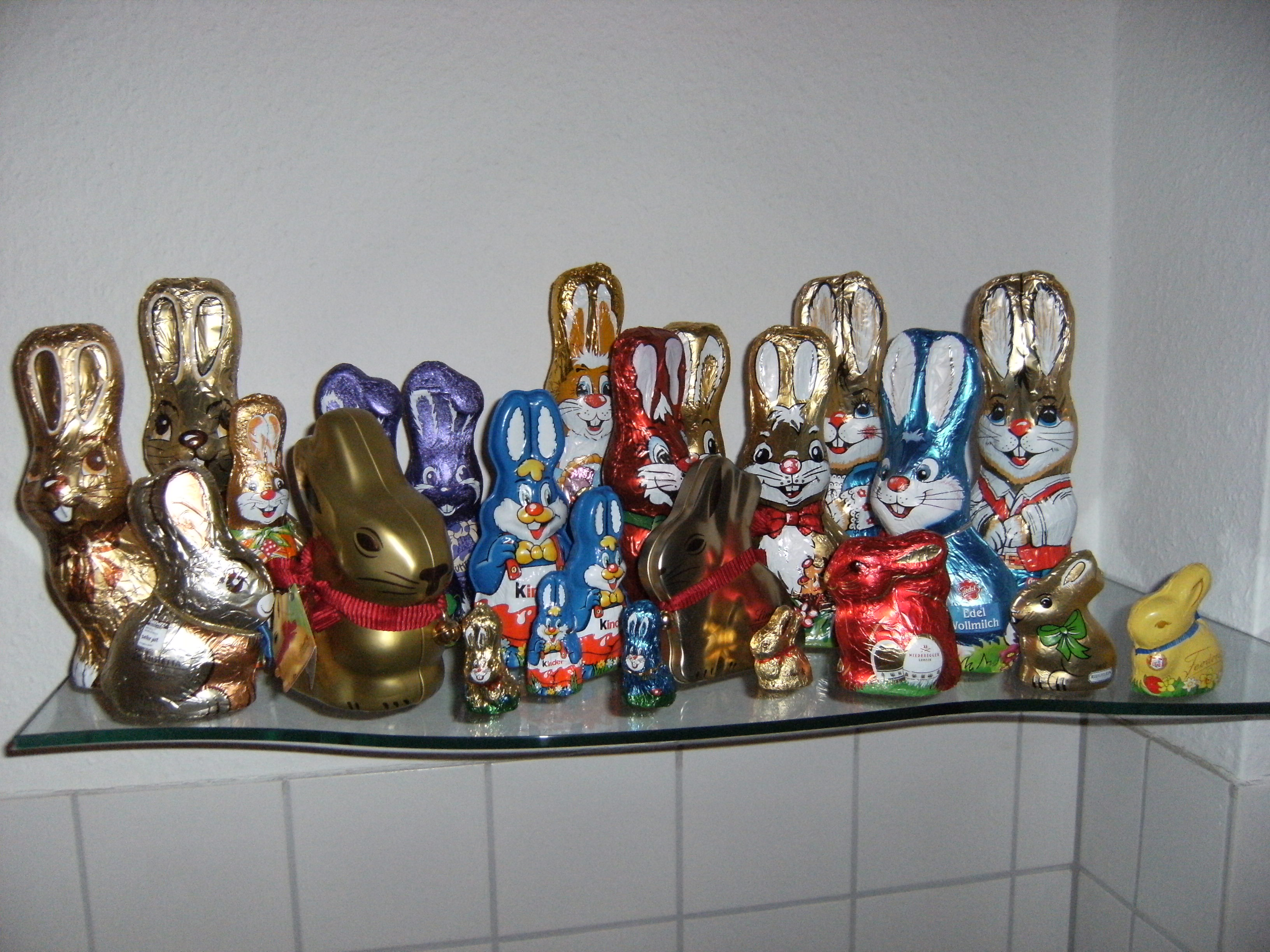
Chocolate Easter Bunny

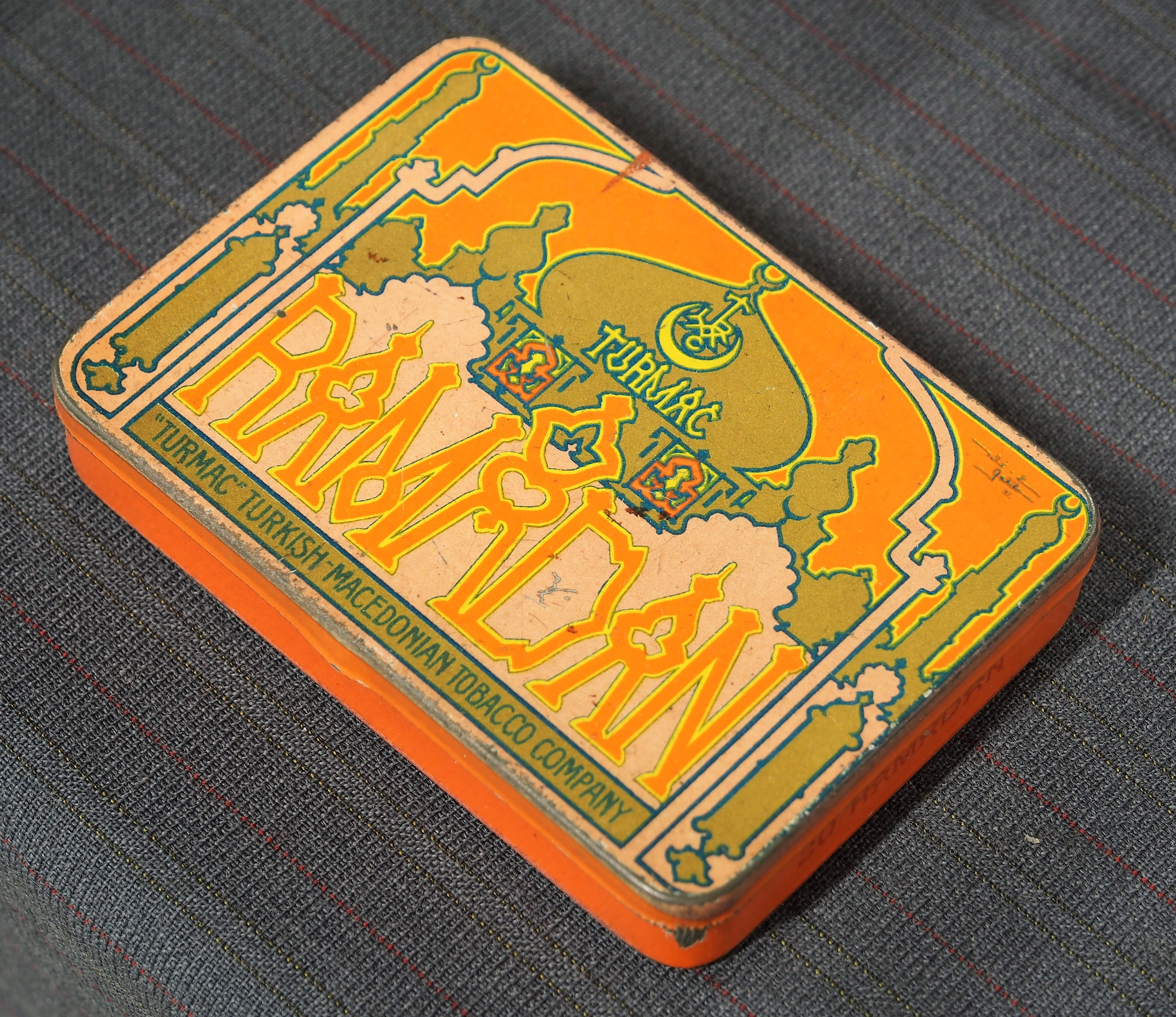
Ramadan cigarettes

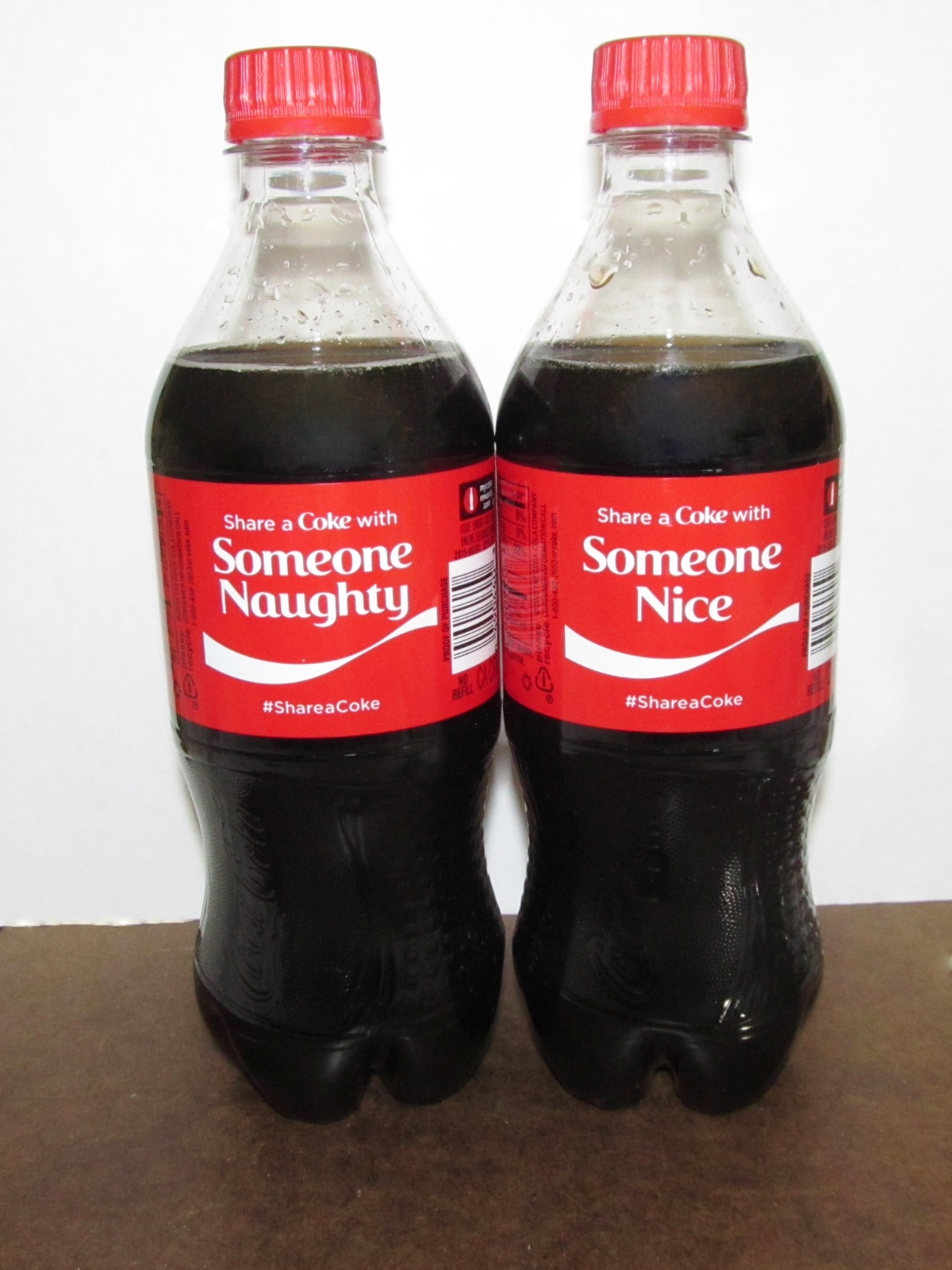
Special labeling of soft drinks

Seasonal packaging is a way of marketing a product and sparking sales in consumer segments that infrequently buy the product, by wrapping the product in a package closely related to seasons or holidays such as Valentine's Day, Easter, Mother's Day, Memorial Day, the Fourth of July, Labor Day, back-to-school, Halloween, Thanksgiving, Christmas and New Year's. It is efficient as a marketing tool.

== Rationale ==
- Packaging works as a "silent salesman," and occupies seven out of ten as a strategic part when a customer makes the decision to buy a particular product. It can be used to attract consumers' eyes and increase in-store purchase decision rate by using unique packaging.

== Meaning ==
- Develop the festival culture.
- Make consumers well-informed about events.

== Development ==
Seasonal packaging was embraced by brands in order to make products stand out from the similar category. Nowadays, the innovative design of product seasonal packaging emphasize the demand of customers rather than competition itself.

== Market power ==
Seasonal packaging use digital printing to print, so that large demand for seasonal packaging production motivates the development of printing market.

== Examples ==
Examples of products that has used seasonal packaging are

- Toblerone (Changing logo to "ToMyLove" or "HoHoHo")
- Quality Street (Changing logo to Quality Dad)
- Coca-Cola Christmas packaging
- Eid packaging
