= The Ad Club =

U.S. trade association

The Advertising Club of Greater Boston
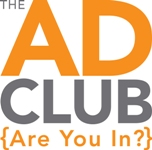
- Formation: 1904
- Legal status: Not For Profit 501(c)6
- Headquarters: Boston, MA
- Region served: New England
- Leadership: Chairman: Cindy Stockwell, Trilia Media
- Website: www.adclub.org

The Ad Club, also known as The Boston Ad Club, more formally The Advertising Club of Greater Boston, originally named the Pilgrim Publicity Association, is the trade association for the marketing, communications, and advertising industry in New England. It serves as a networking organization that connects its members, who pay a yearly fee, to other companies and people within the industry.

== Events ==
=== Hatch Awards ===
The Hatch Awards are an annual event in which advertising agencies and people in the advertising industry in New England are awarded for notable work and lifetime achievements. Winners are chosen by the "Hatch Judging Committee", chosen from the U.S. and Canada. Categories include Consumer Magazine Single Page, Poster, Website, Radio, and Newspaper. As of 2012, the Hatch Awards are in their 52nd consecutive year.

In 2012, The Ad Club released re-hatch.org: a comprehensive archive of winning work from Hatch Awards. The site currently displays 2011 and 2012 winning work.

=== Rosoff Awards ===
This event awards companies which are seen as having taken a proactive approach to running the business concerning diversity and multicultural acceptance within the company. Another more notable aspect of the awards is the scholarships given out to a handful of Boston Public School students who have shown interest in the advertising community and exceptional academic performance throughout High School. In 2009, The Ad Club gave away approximately 100,000 dollars in scholarships to ten different students, sponsored by 5 different New England colleges and a number of corporate sponsors.

=== The EDGE Conference ===
The EDGE conference in an annual event that examines current developments and new innovations in the marketing world. In 2014, the theme of the half-day conference was “Branded in Boston”, focusing on historical brands, services, and innovative ideas that were conceived in Boston and influence aspects of marketing, media, and branding.
