= Verhackert =

Austrian spread

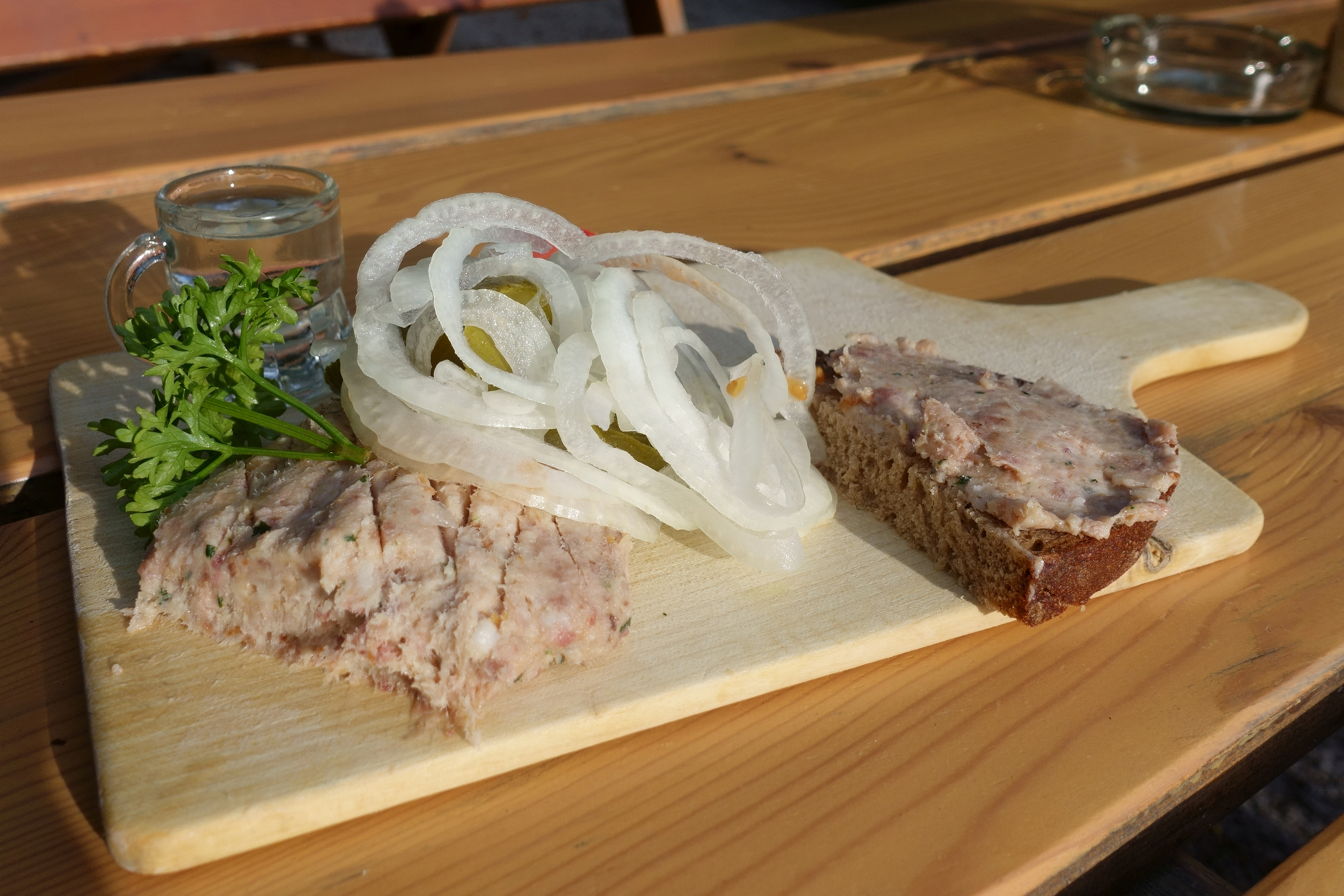
Verhackert with onions and bread

Verhackert is an Austrian spread made from chopped cold-smoked bacon (Räucherspeck), lard, minced garlic, and salt. It is a specialty of Styria and is usually served cold on thick slices of bread.

== Recipe ==
Verhackert is made from chopped cold-smoked bacon (Räucherspeck, not Speck) mixed with minced garlic and pumpkin seed oil.
