= Roger Berkowitz =

American businessman

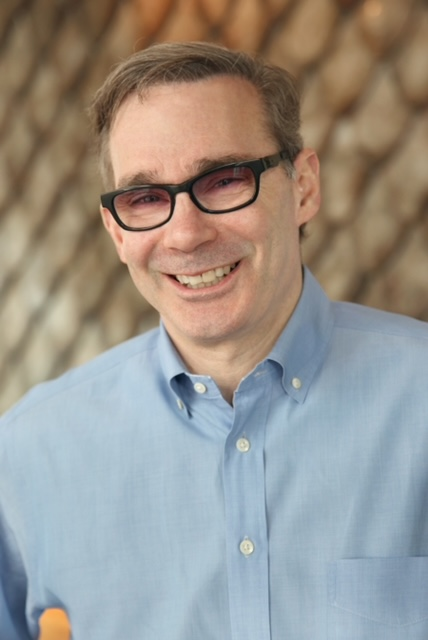
- Born: Roger Berkowitz; Waltham, Massachusetts
- Education: 1974, Syracuse University
- Occupation: 2023, Founder and Head Fishmonger/CEO, Roger's Fish Co. 1992, President & CEO, Legal Sea Foods
- Spouse: Lynne Berkowitz
- Children: 3
- Website: legalseafoods.com

Roger S. Berkowitz is the founder and Head Fishmonger/CEO of Roger's Fish Co., an e-commerce company delivering premium quality seafood and prepared meals nationwide. He was formerly the President and Chief Executive Officer for 30 years of Legal Sea Foods, a Boston-based restaurant group along the northeast of the United States, before selling the family-owned business in 2020. He started working in the Legal Sea Foods fish market in the Inman Square section of Cambridge, Massachusetts at the age of ten and held a variety of roles before becoming President and CEO in 1992. He led the company's growth and diversification, overseeing 35 restaurants, retail and mail order divisions, and 4,000 employees.

== Early life and education ==
Berkowitz was raised in a Jewish family in Waltham and Lexington along with two brothers, Marc and Richard, and worked at the family fish market along with his parents, George and Harriet. After graduating from Lexington High School, Berkowitz studied radio and television at Syracuse University. As an undergraduate, Berkowitz hosted his radio news show covering local and national topics.

After completing his undergraduate studies, Berkowitz returned to Cambridge to work for a couple of years in the family business. The family-run business focus had changed from a fish market, with an attached fried fish take-out option, to a full-service restaurant.

Berkowitz later attended Harvard Business School's Owner/President Management (OPM) program, London Business School's Senior Executive Programme, and the Strategic Marketing Management Program at Stanford Graduate School of Business.

Berkowitz holds an honorary master's degree from The Culinary Institute of America and honorary doctorates degrees from Johnson & Wales University, Newbury College, Salem State University, Nichols College and New England College of Business.

== Leadership and boards ==
Berkowitz is currently a member of NOAA's Marine Fisheries Advisory Committee and founding President of the Massachusetts Seafood Collaborative, a non-profit advocacy group of fishermen, processors, and wholesalers dedicated to strengthening the Massachusetts seafood industry. He also sits on the Regional Selection Panel for the President's Commission on White House Fellowships and is an honoree of the Valenti Friend of the White House Fellow Award.

Berkowitz was a member of the Board of Directors for the Federal Reserve Bank of Boston and the Massachusetts Workforce Training Fund Advisory Committee.

In addition, Berkowitz serves on boards for many nonprofits, including Dana–Farber Cancer Institute, UNICEF, and the Environmental League of Massachusetts. He also serves on the leadership council at the Harvard School of Public Health. He is a member and past President of the Massachusetts Restaurant Association.

== Honors and awards ==
In May 2017, Berkowitz was one of the five people inducted into the James Beard Foundation's Who's Who of Food and Beverage in America.

Berkowitz was named a semifinalist of the James Beard Foundation Award for Outstanding Restaurateur for the years 2009 - 2012, and was an inductee in the Nation's Restaurant News Menu Masters Hall of Fame in 2008.

He was also the recipient of the George Arents Award, which recognizes Syracuse University alumni for their achievements.

Berkowitz was mentioned in the book Dare to Lead! Uncommon Sense and Unconventional Wisdom from 50 Top CEOs by Mike Merrill (Career Press), and Leadership Secrets of the World's Most Successful CEOs by Eric Yaverbaum (Dearborn Trade Publishing).

== Television show and podcast ==
Between 2016-17, Berkowitz hosted a monthly television show on New England Cable News with his co-host, Larry Gulko, called “Inside the Brand". In January 2018, this show transitioned to a WBZ-TV podcast and is currently called "Name Brands". The focus of the program is on marketing and brand building from interviews with top CEOs, such as Wayfair's CEO Niraj Shah and Dunkin' Brands CEO Nigel Travis.

Since the 1990s, Berkowitz narrated and appeared in many of Legal Sea Foods television commercials and other advertising. In his 2015 ad campaign, he ran as a faux candidate in the 2016 presidential election asking people to #feeltheberk and vote for him on the foundation of legalizing sea weed and other viewpoints.

== Sustainable fishing ==
In 2011, Berkowitz criticized the placement of several species of fish on the "avoid" list of the advocacy group, Seafood Watch, saying that much of the science around sustainable fisheries was "flawed" and "outdated." The Boston, Massachusetts Legal Sea Foods restaurant hosted a dinner where several such species were served. New sonar technology for seafood stock assessments Berkowitz espoused is being tested by the Massachusetts government.

Also relative to the fishing industry, Berkowitz leads the Sonar Project Ltd. and was appointed to the Special Commission Relative to Seafood Marketing by the Governor of Massachusetts. He received the "Chairman's Award for Distinguished Meritorious Service" from The Atlantic States Marines Fisheries Commission.

== Bibliography ==
- The New Legal Sea Foods Cookbook (Hardcover), with Jane Doerfer. (Broadway, 2003, revision of 1988 cookbook) ISBN 978-0767906913

== See also ==
- Cuisine of New England
