= EastRise Credit Union =

American credit union

- Type: Credit union
- Industry: Financial services
- Founded: 1961
- Headquarters: Williston, Vermont, United States
- Key people: John Dwyer, CEO
- Products: Savings; checking; consumer loans; business loans; mortgages; credit cards
- Total assets: $3.05B USD (2024)
- Number of employees: 460
- Website: EastRise Credit Union

EastRise Credit Union is a credit union headquartered in Williston, Vermont, chartered and regulated under the authority of the National Credit Union Administration of the U.S. federal government. Founded in 1961 as the IBM Employees Credit Union, EastRise is currently the largest credit union in Vermont with $3.05 billion in assets, 168,460 members, and twenty-two branches.

Membership in the credit union is open to:

- Employees of:
  - State of Vermont
  - Vermont State Employees' Association
  - Vermont State University
  - Community College of Vermont
  - Vermont Foodbank
  - Vermont Community Loan Fund
  - Green Mountain United Ways
  - IBM (when working in Vermont, Massachusetts, Maine, Rhode Island, Hartford County, Connecticut, or Litchfield County, Connecticut)
  - University of Vermont Medical Center (who work or are paid from Burlington, Vermont)
- Organizational Members of:
  - Vermont General Assembly
  - Northeast Sustainable Energy Initiative
  - Washington Electric Cooperative
  - Financial Fitness Association
  - American Consumer Council

Member deposits at EastRise are insured for up to $250,000 through the National Credit Union Share Insurance Fund, the credit union equivalent of the Federal Deposit Insurance Corporation.

== Direct Financial ==
In 2014, New England Federal Credit Union (Now EastRise) acquired HealthOne Credit Union based in Detroit, Michigan. HealthOne had been placed into conservatorship by the State of Michigan in May 2014. Operations in Michigan and Ohio were subsequently run under the Direct Financial branding.

== 2023 Merger and Rebrand ==
In 2022, members of the Vermont State Employees' Credit Union (VSECU), then the second largest credit union in Vermont, narrowly voted merge with New England Federal Credit Union (NEFCU). The measure came into effect on January 1, 2023, with VSECU becoming a division of NEFCU. The combined organization became one of the largest credit unions in the United States with over $3 billion in assets and over 175,000 members.

On September 19, 2024, the recently merged credit unions officially rebranded EastRise Credit Union. The rebrand fulfilled a promise to former VSECU members during the merger campaign in 2022. The credit union adopted a new name, color palette, and logo.

== Charitable activities ==
EastRise sponsors RightTrack, a financial literacy program for high school students. EastRise hosts "Shred Fests" where members of the general public may bring documents to be shredded by a professional shredding company. In 2008, over 13 tons of documents were destroyed. EastRise also annually awards six $3,000 college scholarships to members pursuing degrees in nursing and science.
