= Legal Sea Foods =

American restaurant chain

- Type: Private
- Industry: Restaurants
- Founded: Cambridge, Massachusetts, fish market (1950); restaurant (1968)
- Founder: George Berkowitz
- Headquarters: Boston, Massachusetts, U.S.
- Number of locations: 26 (2026)
- Area served: Eastern Seaboard; Chicago
- Key people: Matt King, President & COO
- Products: seafood
- Brands: Legal Sea Foods; Legal C Bar; Legal Test Kitchen (defunct); Legal Fish Bowl (defunct); Legal Oysteria (defunct)
- Services: Hospitality
- Revenue: US$200 million (2020)
- Number of employees: 3,500 (2020)
- Website: legalseafoods.com

Legal Sea Foods is an American restaurant chain of casual-dining seafood restaurants primarily located in the Northeastern United States.

The current company headquarters is located in the South Boston Seaport District. As of 2026, the group operates 26 restaurants in five states (Illinois, Massachusetts, New Jersey, Rhode Island, and Virginia), with most in the Greater Boston area. The restaurant serves over 7 million customers annually with an average restaurant size of 6,000 square feet (560 m^{2}). Legal Sea Foods also operates an online fish market and ships fresh fish anywhere in the contiguous United States, as well as a retail products division.

In addition to the traditional Legal Sea Foods branches, the company has operated some unique concepts over the years, including Legal Test Kitchen, Legal C Bar, Legal Harborside, Legal Crossing, Legal Oysteria, Legal on the Mystic, and Legal Fish Bowl.

Legal Sea Foods’ long-standing tagline is "If it isn't fresh, it isn't Legal!"

In December 2020, CEO Roger Berkowitz announced the sale of the restaurant's portion of the business to PPX Hospitality Brands, a Massachusetts-based hospitality group.

The founder of Legal Sea Foods, George Berkowitz, died on February 20, 2022. George Berkowitz was 97.

== History ==
=== Origins ===
In 1904, Harry Berkowitz opened the "Legal Cash Market" grocery store in the Inman Square neighborhood of Cambridge, Massachusetts. The name for the market came from the "Legal Stamps", also known as trading stamps, given to loyal customers. The store provided a living for Harry and his family until the late 1940s when chain grocery stores like Stop & Shop and others entered the picture and provided stiff competition for the family business.

In 1950, George Berkowitz, the son of Harry, opened a fish market adjacent to his father's grocery store and named it Legal Sea Foods. This was done to add a degree of specialty to the grocery business by offering customers a fish counter to purchase fresh fish. From the early 1950s, the market sold fresh fish as well as fish and chips that could only be taken to-go. In 1968, the Berkowitz family opened a restaurant in the adjacent space. They offered fish and chips, fried clams, fried shrimp, and fried scallops, served on paper plates while the customers sat at picnic tables.

In 1975, the restaurant expanded with the opening of a more traditional outlet at the site of the former S.S. Pierce building in Chestnut Hill, Massachusetts. The original Inman Square restaurant was destroyed in a fire on January 18, 1980. With the help of his two sons, Marc and Roger, George opened their flagship location in the Boston Park Plaza in the Boston Theater District of downtown Boston that same year.

=== 1980s ===
At the first inauguration of Ronald Reagan in 1981, Legal Sea Foods' fish chowder was chosen to represent the Commonwealth of Massachusetts and has been served at every presidential inauguration since. Also in 1981, the restaurant established one of the first quality control centers for fish processing and distribution.

In 1986, Legal Sea Foods was named "Best Seafood Restaurant in America" by NBC's Today Show.

=== 1990s ===
In 1990, the restaurant partnered with the United States Department of Commerce in developing a hazard analysis and critical control points (HACCP) program and helped to establish a landmark fishing industry standard for freshness and food safety.

In 1992, Roger Berkowitz, the son of George, took over as CEO of the private restaurant business. Roger had worked in the family business since the age of ten and is an honorary graduate of the S. I. Newhouse School of Public Communications at Syracuse University. During this time Roger became the company spokesman, and voiced many of the Legal Sea Foods radio commercials, including the award-winning "Fresh Insights" radio campaign.

In March 1994, Food Arts Magazine awarded the Silver Spoon Award to George and Roger Berkowitz for sterling performance and raising Americans' consciousness about seafood for 30 years. That same year Legal Sea Foods also opened their first airport restaurant at Logan International Airport's Terminal C, followed later in the year by a location in Philadelphia International Airport. Also, in 1994, Legal Sea Foods invited influential chefs from China to fuse Asian cuisine into the menu at the restaurants. This program was called "Cuisineast" and some dishes created for this event are still on the current menu.

At the Super Bowl XXXI in 1997, fans in New Orleans were served New England clam chowder from Legal Sea Food's Chowda van.

In 1998, Roger Berkowitz was invited to join the Harvard School of Public Health Nutrition Roundtable, a group of people with personal and professional interests in nutrition. In the same year, Bon Appétit magazine named Legal Sea Food one of the Top Ten Tried and True restaurants in America. It was in this year that Rich Vellante became the restaurant group's Executive Chef.

In 1999, the International Foodservice Manufacturers Association presented Roger Berkowitz with the Silver Plate award for America's best full-service, multi-unit restaurant operator, one of the food industry's highest honors.

=== 2000s ===
In 2000, the American Institute of Food and Wine sponsored Legal Sea Food's 50th birthday with celebrity chefs, including Julia Child, in attendance. The CBS news program, Eye on America, focused on Legal Sea Food restaurant's quality control program with a segment on food safety.

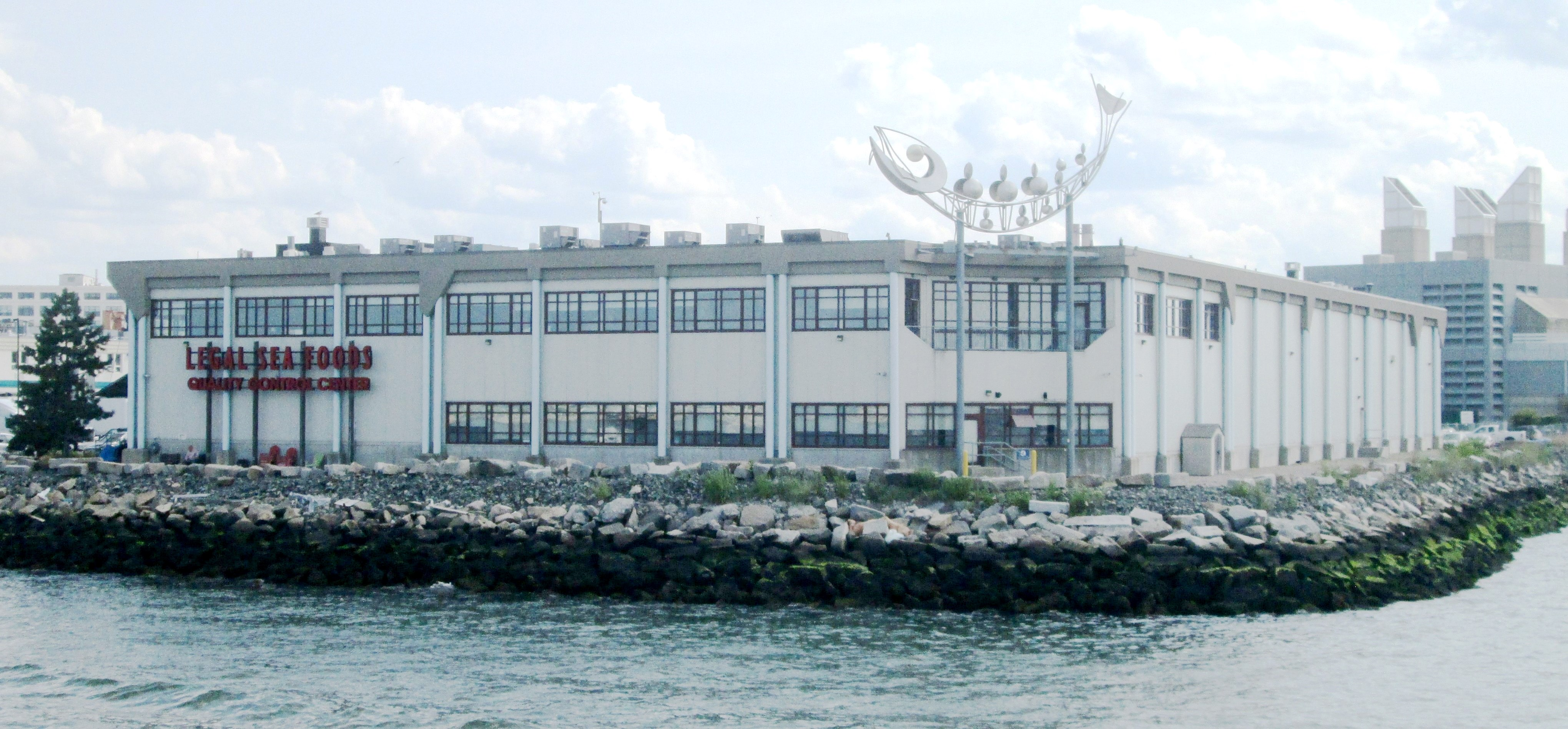
Legal Sea Foods Quality Control Center and corporate headquarters as seen from Boston Harbor (2017).

In 2003, Legal Sea Foods became one of the first American restaurants to go trans-fat free. The New Legal Sea Foods Cookbook was published in this year.

In 2005, a new type of restaurant, Legal Test Kitchen (LTK), was introduced, with a menu that was 50 to 60 percent non-seafood and with comparably lower prices than traditional Legal Sea Foods locations. Also in 2005, Legal Sea Foods began to offer gluten-free options on the menu for the first time, giving patrons with celiac disease more dining options.

In 2008, Legal Sea Foods was named one of the ten best full-service or buffet-style restaurant chains which cater to families, according to Parents magazine. Later in 2008, Roger Berkowitz was inducted into the Nation's Restaurant News MenuMasters Hall of Fame.

In 2009, Legal C Bar debuted with an outlet in Dedham, Massachusetts, focused on serving casual seafood and custom cocktails.

=== 2010s ===
In 2011, Legal Sea Foods opened their new flagship restaurant, Legal Harborside on the Boston waterfront. It was named "Best New Restaurant" by Esquire magazine.

Two years later in 2013, Legal Sea Foods announced they would be opening a restaurant in the Downtown Crossing section of Boston named Legal Crossing (LXI).

On February 22, 2014, a carbon monoxide leak killed the manager of the Legal Sea Foods branch at the Walt Whitman Shops in Huntington Station, New York and sickened 27 others. The leak was reportedly caused by a faulty flue pipe attached to a gas water heater. President & CEO of Legal Sea Foods, Roger Berkowitz, said that the company would install carbon monoxide detectors and conduct comprehensive safety audits at all locations. He also pledged to be at the forefront of legislative efforts to require the use of carbon monoxide detectors in commercial buildings.

In April 2017, Legal Fish Bowl debuted in Kendall Square. The restaurant is a fast-casual concept that features six signature poke bowls as well as the option to create your own. In that same year, Roger Berkowitz was awarded a “Who's Who” James Beard Award.

In 2018, the company opened Legal Sea Bar, a bar-forward concept, in Union Station in Washington, DC.

2019 marked the start of a collaboration with Stonewall Kitchen, a specialty food manufacturer based in Maine, on a line of signature sauces, dressings and condiments. These products are sold under the name "Legal Sea Foods by Stonewall Kitchen” and range from cocktail sauce to lemon dill aioli.

=== 2020s ===
In January 2020, Legal Sea Foods announced a partnership with RLJ Companies to expand the presence of Legal Sea Foods restaurants in major airports across the United States.

In 2022, the group operated 25 restaurants in five states (Massachusetts, New Jersey, Pennsylvania, Rhode Island, and Virginia), with most in the Greater Boston area.

==== Response to the COVID-19 pandemic and sale ====
At the start of the COVID-19 pandemic, Legal Sea Foods had 33 locations, 3,500 employees, and more than $200 million in annual revenue. By March 2020, Legal Sea Foods had closed all locations for indoor dining. During the summer, the restaurant chain gradually re-opened 18 more prominent locations in the Greater Boston Area. In August 2020, $10 million from the federal government Paycheck Protection Program ran out, and the company began exploring mergers with other restaurant operators. In December, the group merged with PPX Hospitality Brands, a subsidiary of Danu Partners. Under the terms of the sale, Roger Berkowitz kept control of online and retail sales using the Legal Sea Foods name, and PPX became the new owner of the restaurant network and the Quality Control Center in South Boston. Following the acquisition of the restaurants by PPX, there were reports from certain vendors indicating that they had not been remunerated in full, despite Berkowitz having allocated adequate funds for this purpose. The media covered these reports at the time.

In 2021, PPX, in partnership with DoorDash, opened its first two Legal Sea Foods dark kitchens in an attempt to widen the footprint of the brand and to take advantage of the growing food delivery market.

== Sustainability ==
During SENA15, CEO Roger Berkowitz talked sustainability during the conference. He mentioned how many chefs in the industry were misinformed on the so-called 'blacklisted' fish, those that were not sustainable to catch and serve. Berkowitz states how Legal Sea Foods has the responsibility of sourcing the fish appropriately and not from areas that may not support the species. An example used was the Chilean Sea-bass sourcing, where instead of sourcing sustainably farmed units, they don't source it at all. This is because the Chilean Sea-bass is an overfished species, and even serving it in the menu stating it is sustainably sourced may not portray the best image for its customers and shareholders.

Legal Sea Foods also has a reputation of having "top catch" fishing methods, where the fish are not hauled in to the boat until it is docked, or source fish from "day boats", which are fishermen who leave to fish only for the day.

The New England restaurant chain also only serves fish which are within National Ocean and Atmospheric Administration's (NOAA's) guidelines, which are considered sustainable species by the federal government.

== Locations ==
As of April 2023, Legal Sea Foods operates 23 restaurants spanning 4 states.

Restaurant locations
Location	City	State
Copley Place	Boston	MA
Downtown Crossing	Boston	MA
Harborside	Boston	MA
Logan Airport Terminal A	Boston	MA
Logan Airport Terminal B	Boston	MA
Logan Airport Terminal B Connector	Boston	MA
Logan Airport Terminal E	Boston	MA
Long Wharf	Boston	MA
Park Square	Boston	MA
Forbes Road	Braintree	MA
Burlington Mall	Burlington	MA
Kendall Square	Cambridge	MA
The Street	Chestnut Hill	MA
Legacy Place	Dedham	MA
Route 9	Framingham	MA
Derby Street Shops	Hingham	MA
MarketStreet	Lynnfield	MA
Northshore Mall	Peabody	MA
Assembly Row	Somerville	MA
Reagan National Airport	Arlington	VA
Virginia Beach	Virginia Beach	VA
The Mall at Short Hills	Short Hills	NJ
Garden City Center	Cranston	RI

== Operations ==
Legal Sea Foods became one of the first restaurants in the United States to employ lean production techniques to improve the customer experience. One of the main changes was to install a line back position, similar to a bar-back, to quickly restock whatever the chef or cook needed in a just-in-time flow.

== Menu ==
The menus vary by location, season, and concept, including specialty seafood entrees, appetizers, salads, and desserts. Over 40 varieties of fresh fish and shellfish, prepared according to New England tradition, are featured throughout the year. Some of the most popular items include: lobster, clam chowder, fried clams, crab cakes, shrimp cocktail, tuna burgers, baked scrod, surf and turf and grilled fish fillets. Extensive wine lists and full-service bars are also available at all locations and have garnered recognition for their philosophy of offering value at all price points. The restaurant offers separate lunch and dinner menus, gluten-free options, and a kids’ menu.

By buying directly from day boat fishing operations, the company markets itself as having the freshest fish. The company also made industry advances in fish handling and has worked with federal agencies on developing Hazard Analysis and Critical Control Points (HACCP).

== In the media ==
Bon Appétit magazine touts a meal at Legal Sea Foods as among America's "Top Ten Tried-and-True" dining experiences. Legal Sea Foods is also included in Patricia Schultz's popular guidebook, "1,000 Places to See Before You Die".

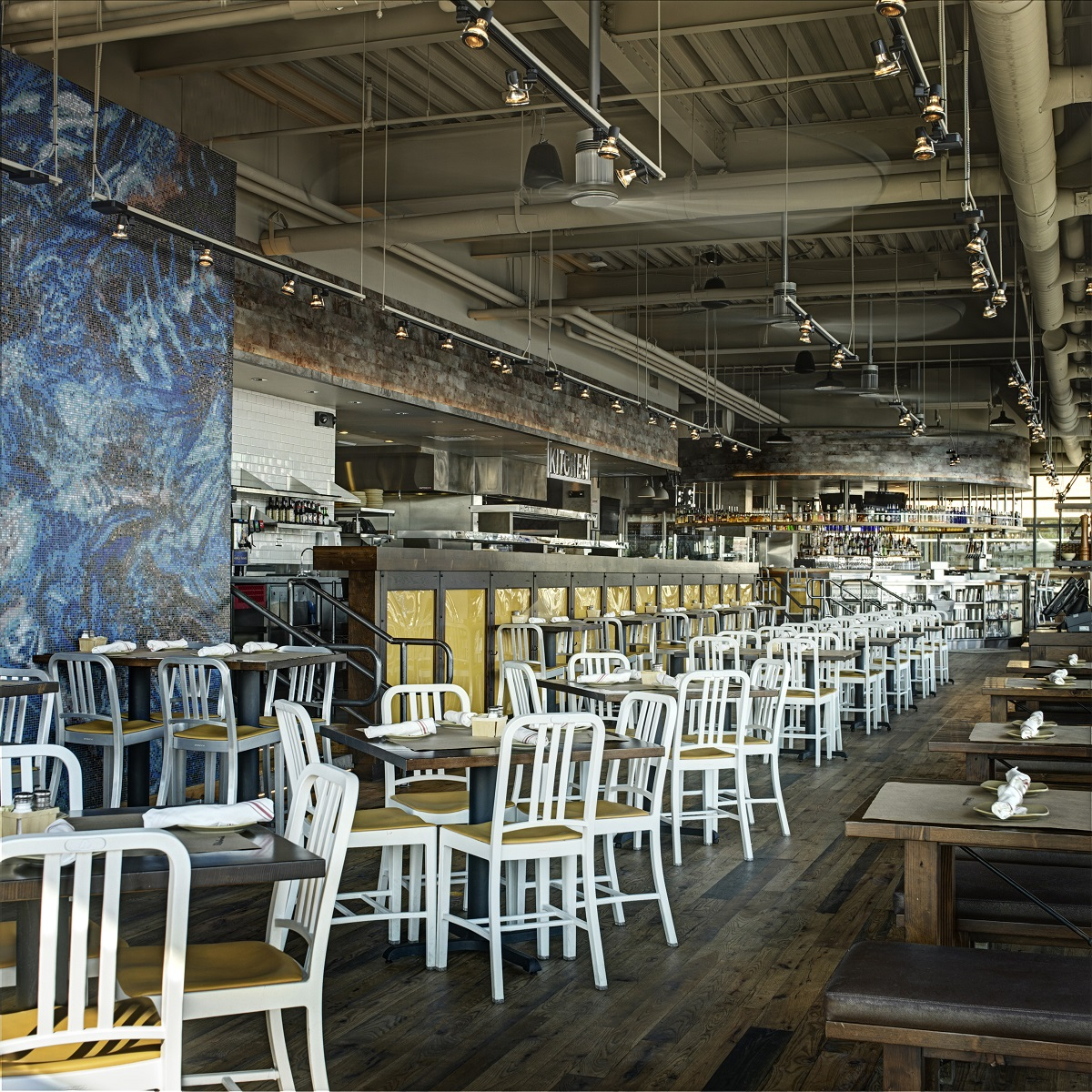
The Legal Harborside first floor dining room at their restaurant in the South Boston Waterfront.

In January 2011, Legal Sea Foods sponsored a dinner that featured several species of fish which were listed by the advocacy organization Seafood Watch as ones to avoid for sustainability reasons. Legal Sea Foods CEO, Roger Berkowitz said in a statement that much of the science around sustainable fisheries was "flawed" and "outdated." While the protest was criticized by several environmental organizations, it was praised by others, including some in the media. Representatives of fishermen in Gloucester supported the choice to use locally sourced fish.

=== Awards ===
- "100 Most Scenic Restaurants in America", Legal Harborside – OpenTable (2019, 2018)
- "Best Clam Chowder" – Boston Magazine (2017, 2011, 2010)
- Who’s Who in Food & Beverage in America, James Beard – Roger Berkowitz, 2017
- Best Seafood Restaurant, USA Today, 2013
- Boston's Most Popular Restaurant, Zagat, every year since 2003
- Most Admired Restaurant, Boston Business Journal, 2013 and 2012
- Best Classy Restaurant for Kids in Philly, Philadelphia Magazine, 2013
- Best New Restaurants, Legal Harborside, Esquire magazine, 2011
- Listed in 1,000 Places to See Before You Die: A Traveler's Life List, Patricia Schultz
- Legal Sea Foods clam chowder served at every presidential inauguration since 1981

== Advertising and marketing ==
Since 2007, DeVito/Verdi has been Legal Sea Foods’ advertising agency of record.

In 2008, Legal Sea Foods ran a humorous campaign called "Really Fresh Fish". The campaign's out-of-home and radio advertisements created controversy for their “fresh” lines and won industry awards.

In 2010, the company launched a radio campaign called "Fresh Insights". CEO Roger Berkowitz was the voice of the ads, which were finalists in the Radio Mercury Awards.

In 2014, Legal Sea Foods began running print and television spots that argue that its seafood restaurants should never be called a chain; the series of advertisements use the restaurant's chief executive, Roger Berkowitz to explain why.

In March 2015, Legal Sea Foods partnered with Uber on a promotion to deliver bowls of clam chowder anywhere in the city of Boston. The chowder cost $10 with $1 being donated to the Greater Boston Food Bank.

In 2015, Legal Sea Foods launched a multimedia advertising campaign that attempted to establish a new religion whose members would be known as "pescatarians", comparing them to Catholics and Presbyterians. CEO Roger Berkowitz said that the campaign was the widest-reaching to date and spanned all forms of media from print, online, television, and even a gag website. The humorous campaign faced minor backlash from religious people who were offended by comparing the restaurant to Jesus and Moses.

During the presidential primary of 2016, Legal Sea Foods launched a campaign-themed parody. On Super Tuesday, Roger Berkowitz declared himself a candidate for President of the United States in a parody ad campaign of the "fishy" election. Among other things, he promised that on his first day in office he'd legalize seaweed, and he urged voters to #feeltheberk on social media. The spots aired in newspapers, news radio and in print.

The "Welcome to Legal" campaign launched in 2019 with advertisements that play on the legality of marijuana in Massachusetts. The campaign received national attention, with commentary from publications including AdWeek and AdAge.

== Affiliations ==
Legal Sea Foods has a long relationship with the Boston Red Sox and Boston Celtics. The Celtics’ "Fan of the Game" promotion was founded by Legal Sea Foods and has been played at every home game for over 10 years. The company was also a sponsor of the Washington Capitals. In addition, Legal Sea Foods introduced the "Lobster Lob" at all home games played by the Boston Pride, part of the National Women's Hockey League, during the 2019–2020 season.

== See also ==
- Cuisine of New England
- List of seafood restaurants
- List of restaurant chains in the United States
