= Office supply retailing =

Commercial trade of office supplies

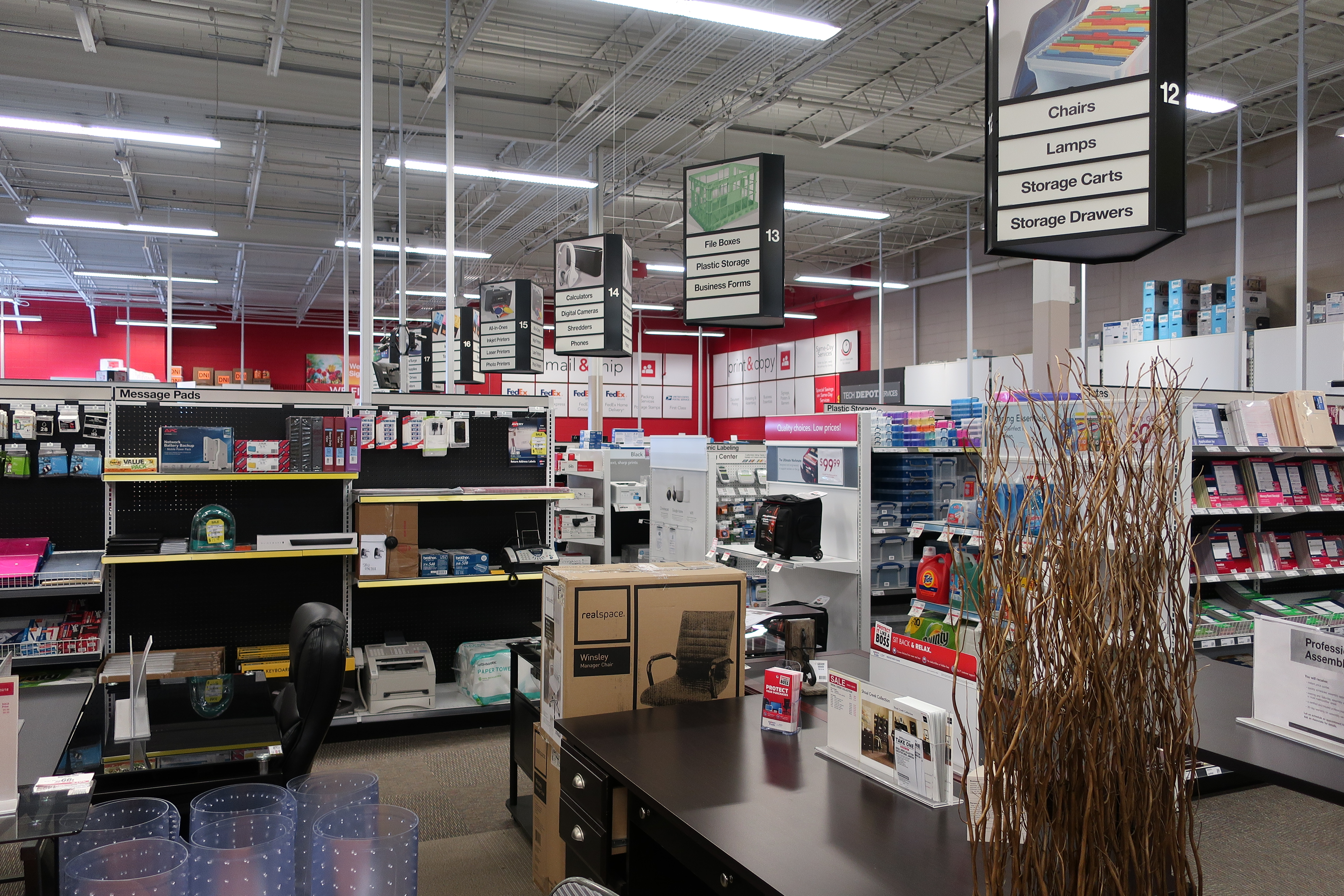
The interior of an Office Depot store in Wyoming, United States.

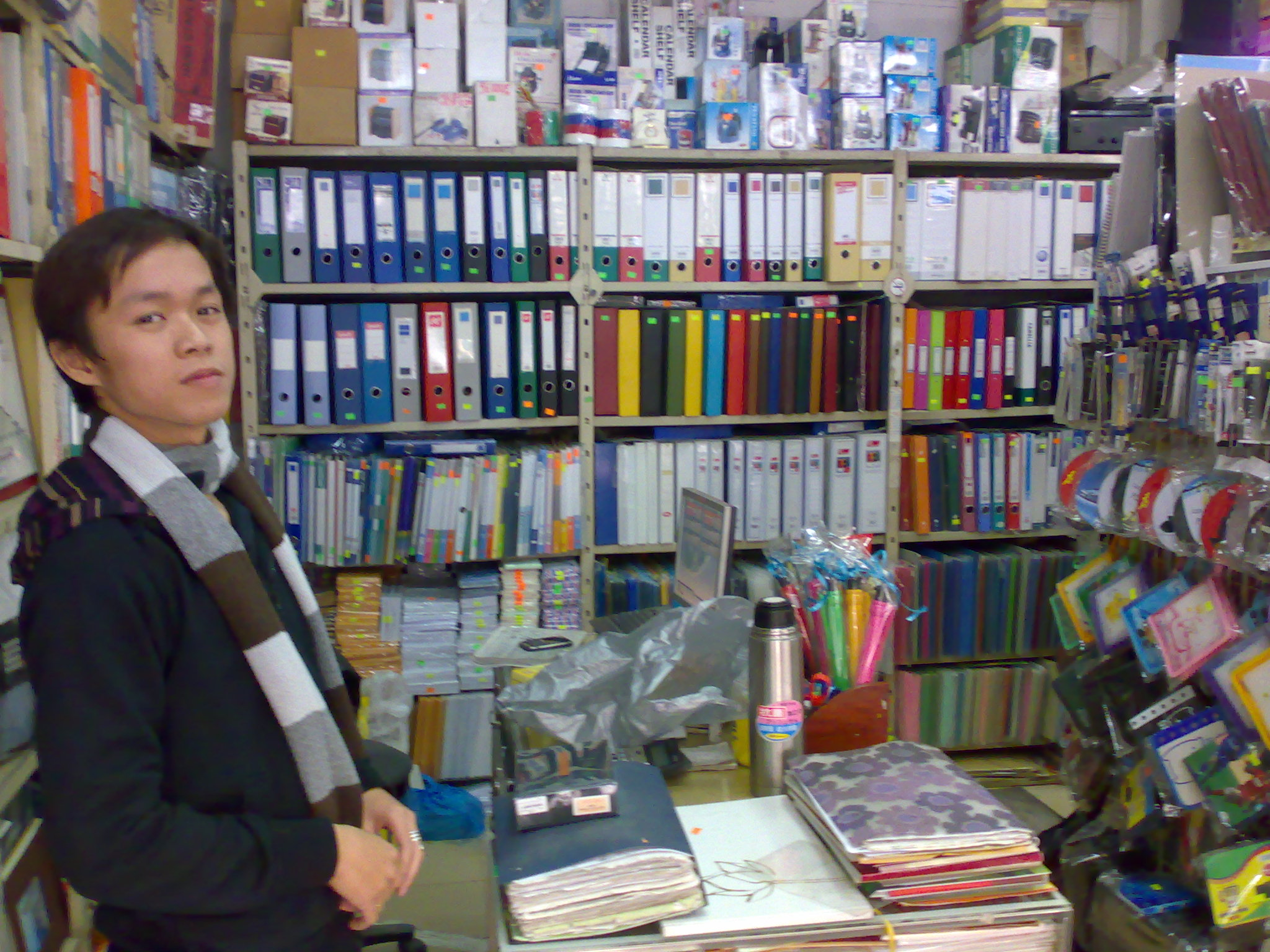
The interior of a stationer in Hanoi, Vietnam.

Office supply retailing is the commercial trade of stationery and other office supplies.

An office supply retailer, stationer, stationery retailer or business solutions retailer sells things typically found in an office or classroom, such as computers, monitors, printers, paper writing instruments, books, desks, office chairs and lamps, as well as novelty items like picture frames, artworks and pot plants. Many provide a range of printing, photography, lamination and binding services. Some may provide repair and recovery services.

The term 'stationery' originally referred to all products sold by a medieval stationer, a "stationary" storekeeper who kept a fixed location near a university rather than others who travelled to markets or fairs. These stores bound, copied, published and lent out books, often providing a greater range of books than university libraries.

Modern office supply stores usually sell supplies for school students, particularly at the start of school years. Historically, this includes like exercise books, pens, pencils, coloured pencils, crayons and other art supplies which students are often required to bring to class. In markets where bring your own device and remote learning is more common, it includes the technology students are required to provide for themselves.

Retailers also supply products required for a range of businesses and activities. Historically, desk stationery and printing services were major sources of revenue. In the 21st century, revenue has increasingly come from technology and furniture instead.

Many retailers have experienced a loss of revenue from major business clients due to the growth of working from home, particularly during the COVID-19 pandemic. Retailers have shifted their focus to selling home office products direct to consumers, such as by offering a broader range of styles and home delivery.

== By market ==
=== Australia ===
Officeworks, Smiggle, Typo and Winc sell stationery and office supplies in Australia.

=== Canada ===
Canadian stationers include Dollarama, Grand & Toy and Staples Canada.

=== United Kingdom ===
Office supply retailers in the United Kingdom include Ryman, UOE Store and Viking Direct.

A chain of stationers called Office World existed until 2005.

=== United States ===
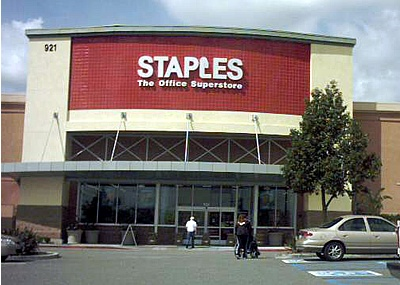
The exterior of a Staples store in California, United States.

Office Depot and Staples are major companies with the office retailing sector in the United States.

Other retailers include IBM Product Center, InkStop, The ODP Corporation, Office 1 Superstore, Office Zone, OfficeMax, Quill Corporation, ReStockIt, [[TechnomartLLC]] ,Shoplet and W.B. Mason.

=== Asia ===
The Rong Bao Zhai stationery shop has been operating in Beijing, China since 1672.

M&G Stationery has stores around China and Singapore.

== See also ==
- Bookselling
