= Staples Canada =

Office supplies retail chain

Staples Canada ULC
- Logo used since 2018

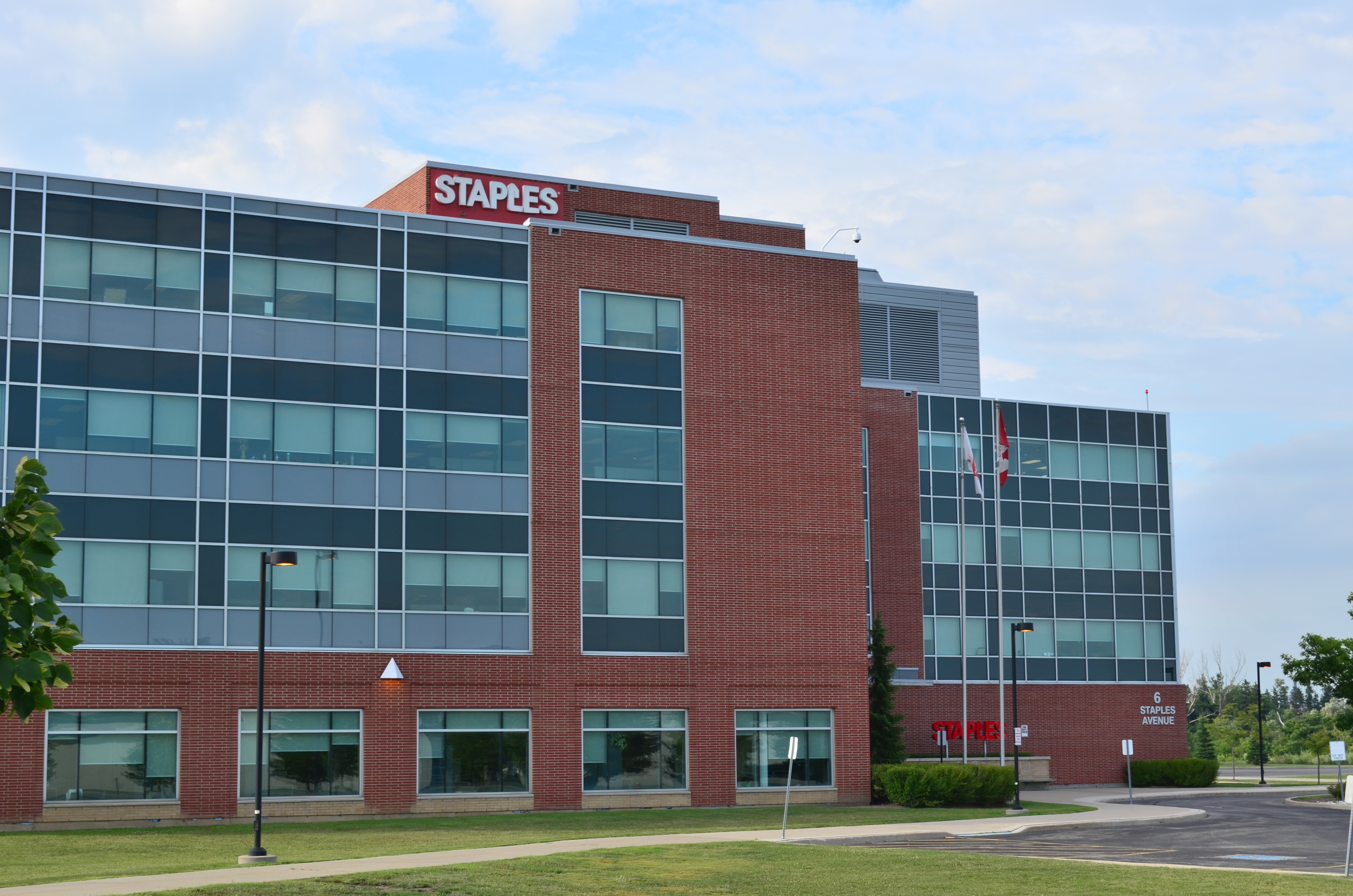
- Staples Canada Headquarters in Richmond Hill, Ontario, in 2014
- Formerly: The Business Depot (1991–1994); Staples Business Depot (1994–2008)
- Company type: Private
- Founded: 1991; 35 years ago
- Founder: Jack Bingleman
- Headquarters: Richmond Hill, Ontario, Canada
- Number of locations: 296
- Key people: John Lederer (executive chairman); Jens Cermak (CEO)
- Products: Technology (Computers/Business Machines/Entertainment), Furniture, Office Supplies, Copy and Print Services, Tech Services, School Supplies, Legal Supplies, Facility Supplies, Wireless
- Owner: Sycamore Partners
- Number of employees: 15,000+
- Website: www.staples.ca

Bureau en Gros logo used in Quebec

Staples Canada ULC, operating as Staples (Bureau en Gros in Quebec), is a Canadian retail sales company owned by American private equity firm Sycamore Partners. Staples was founded by Leo Kahn and Thomas G. Stemberg. Since 2017, Staples Canada has operated independently from Staples' U.S. retail and U.S. business-to-business (B2B) operations.

== History ==
The Business Depot Ltd. was founded by Jack Bingleman in 1991, with Staples as a substantial investor, opening Business Depot stores in Canada. The American counterpart acquired the Canadian company in 1994.

The company would operate in English-language markets under the co-branding "Staples Business Depot", although stores in the Greater Toronto Area initially continued to operate under the "Business Depot" banner. The presence of Business Depot resulted in trademark issues when competitor Office Depot expanded into Canada: in 1993, Staples obtained an injunction preventing the Office Depot name from being used in Ontario, and thus its stores were operated under the name "The Office Place" instead. The two companies reached a settlement in May 2001, allowing Office Depot to begin using its name on store brand products in Ontario in September 2001, and on store signage in June 2002.

In 2008, Staples acquired Corporate Express. In February 2015, Staples announced its intent to acquire Office Depot (which had also recently merged with Grand & Toy owner OfficeMax); on December 7, 2015, both the Competition Bureau and the U.S. Federal Trade Commission announced that they would move to block the merger under antitrust grounds.

In 2017, Staples was acquired by private equity firm Sycamore Partners for $6.9 billion. Under the new owner, Staples Inc. was split into three "independently managed and capitalized" entities; Staples Canada serves as one of these entities, alongside Staples North American Delivery and Staples U.S. Retail.

In December 2018, Staples Canada unveiled a new logo, and the new slogan "Work. Learn. Grow". The rebranding was accompanied by a new store concept, which first launched in Montreal and at its 375 University Avenue flagship store in Toronto. They feature demo areas with curated selections from various product lines (including pens, paper, journals, and consumer electronics), the "Solution Shop" for print and marketing services, and the latter featuring "Staples Studio" co-working areas and an auditorium-style "Spotlight" theatre (which can be rented for sessions and events). With the new concept, Staples Canada began to position itself as "the working and learning company".

In January 2024, Staples Canada began to participate in a pilot project by the Ontario provincial government to relocate some ServiceOntario locations (which provide government services such as vehicle licensing) from standalone bureaus to kiosks within retail stores. Two Walmart Canada stores are also participating in the pilot. Taxpayer money is being used to cover associated renovations, at an estimated cost of $1.75 million; the Ontario NDP questioned the Doug Ford government's decision to enter into a taxpayer-funded sole-source contract with an American-owned corporation to deliver government services.
