= Joseph Kahn (journalist) =

American journalist (born 1964)

Joe Kahn
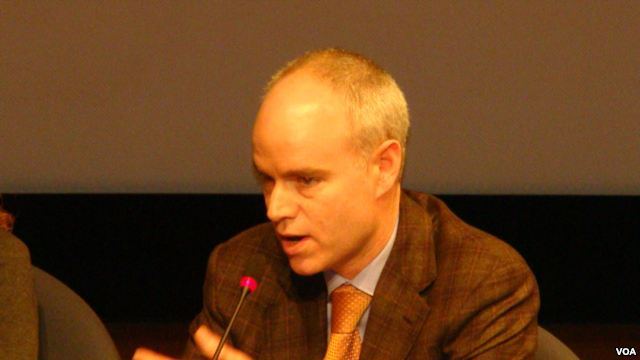
- Born: August 19, 1964 (age 62); Boston, Massachusetts, U.S.
- Education: Harvard University (BA, MA)
- Employer: The New York Times
- Father: Leo Kahn

Joseph F. Kahn (born August 19, 1964) is an American journalist who currently serves as executive editor of The New York Times.

== Education ==
Kahn attended Middlesex School as a boarding student, serving as editor-in-chief of both the school newspaper and its literary magazine before graduating in 1983. He attended Harvard University as an undergraduate, where he earned a bachelor's degree in American history in 1987 and was president of The Harvard Crimson. In 1990, he received a master's degree in East Asian studies from the Harvard Graduate School of Arts and Sciences.

== Career ==
Kahn joined the Times in January 1998, after four years as China correspondent for The Wall Street Journal. Before the Journal, he was a reporter at The Dallas Morning News, where he was part of a team of reporters awarded the Pulitzer Prize in 1994 for international reporting for their stories on violence against women around the world. In June 1989, the Chinese government ordered Kahn to leave the country because he was working as a reporter while using a tourist visa.

In 2006, Kahn and Jim Yardley won the Pulitzer Prize for International Reporting for the Times covering rule of law in China, including their coverage of the detention of American-Chinese entrepreneur David Ji.

Kahn was assistant masthead editor for International at the New York Times from 2014 to September 2016. In 2016, Dean Baquet appointed him as managing editor for the Times, where in time he was recognized as Baquet's likely successor as executive editor.

== Personal life ==
Kahn's grandparents on his father's side were Jewish from Lithuania. His mother's parents were Catholic immigrants from Ireland. Kahn is the eldest child of Dorothy Davidson and Leo Kahn (1916–2011), founder of the Purity Supreme supermarket chain in New England and co-founder of the global office supply chain Staples. Leo had been awarded a journalism degree from Columbia University, after which he briefly had worked as a reporter, prompting a continuing interest in journalism that was reflected in his frequent dissection of newspaper coverage with his son. Kahn served on the board of the Committee for Accuracy in Middle East Reporting in America (CAMERA) from 1990 and up to at least 2008.

== See also ==
- New Yorkers in journalism
