= Walmart Canada =

Division of Walmart

- "Spark" symbol used since 2025

- Wordmark used since 2025
- Trade name: Walmart
- Type: Subsidiary
- Industry: Retail / Discount retail store
- Predecessor: Woolco Canada
- Founded: January 14, 1994; 32 years ago
- Headquarters: 1940 Argentia Road Mississauga, Ontario, Canada
- Number of locations: 403 (344 supercentres, 59 discount stores)
- Key people: Venessa Yates, President and CEO
- Number of employees: 90,000 (approximately as of June 2020)
- Parent: Walmart
- Website: walmart.ca

Walmart Canada is a Canadian retail corporation, discount retailer and the Canadian subsidiary of the U.S.-based multinational retail conglomerate Walmart. Headquartered in Mississauga, Ontario, it was founded on March 17, 1994, with the purchase of the Woolco Canada chain from the F. W. Woolworth Company.

Originally consisting of discount stores, many of Walmart Canada's contemporaries and competitors include Giant Tiger, Home Hardware, Canadian Tire, Mark's, Sport Chek, GameStop, Dollarama, Winners, HomeSense, Rossy, Staples Canada, Michaels, Pet Valu, the Great Canadian Dollar Store, Dollar Tree, and Hart Stores. Based on the success of the U.S. format, Walmart Canada has focused on expanding Supercentres into new or converted locations, offering groceries, placing them in the same market as supermarket chains such as Loblaws, Real Canadian Superstore, Real Atlantic Superstore, Your Independent Grocer, No Frills, Metro, Sobeys, Foodland, Thrifty Foods, Safeway, Save-On-Foods, Country Grocer, Fairway Markets, Quality Foods, Co-op and others. Walmart is the second-largest retailer in Canada by revenue.

As of October 31, 2022, Walmart Canada has 403 stores operating, including 344 supercentres and 59 discount stores in almost every province and territory except for Nunavut. Walmart Canada's principal developer and landlord is SmartCentres; other significant landlords include Riocan and First Capital Realty.

It is a participant in the voluntary Scanner Price Accuracy Code managed by the Retail Council of Canada.

In 2016, Walmart Canada committed to source only cage-free eggs by 2025. The company later retracted its 2025 deadline in 2022. Walmart Canada published annual cage-free sourcing progress for the first time in 2025, reporting 9% regional progress. As of May 2026, Walmart has not published a new deadline.

== History ==
Logo from 1994 to 2001

Logo from 2001 to 2009

Walmart Canada was established on January 14, 1994, through the acquisition by Walmart of 122 Canadian leases of Woolco, a subsidiary of Woolworth Canada. These Woolco stores were renovated and converted into the Walmart banner. Walmart did not acquire 22 other Woolco stores that were either unionized or had downtown locations. Some former Woolco stores were sold and re-opened as Zellers stores. By acquiring these Woolco storefronts, Walmart Canada had expanded to 260 stores by 2005, making it Canada's second-largest retail chain. The first CEO of Walmart Canada was R. Bruce West.

All 16,000 former employees of the Woolco stores that Walmart acquired were retained, retrained, and given a five percent raise. Mario Pilozzi, a senior vice-president at Woolco when the deal was signed, eventually became CEO of Walmart Canada. Pilozzi, who retired in 2008, has proclaimed that he and "his management team took a limping chain and turned it into the Walmart powerhouse that became a game-changer on the Canadian business scene. Retailers changed, Canadian manufacturers faced demands and volumes they had not seen before, real estate transitioned from enclosed malls to big-box plazas". Reflecting on the 1994 deal in 2013, a Walmart Canada spokesman was quoted as saying "Even though Woolco had seen better days and was struggling, there was still an enormous amount of talent in that company. I think that is one of the reasons Walmart has succeeded in Canada, is because we started with a fantastic team that we re-motivated".

Logo from 2009 to 2025

On July 24, 2009, Walmart Canada Bank was incorporated under the Bank Act in Canada. On May 17, 2018, Wal-Mart Canada announced it had reached a definitive agreement to sell Wal-Mart Canada Bank to First National co-founder Stephen Smith and private equity firm Centerbridge Partners, L.P., on undisclosed financial terms. On the purely coincidental date of April 1, 2019, Centerbridge Partners, L.P. and Stephen Smith jointly announced the closing of the previously announced acquisition of Wal-Mart Canada Bank and that it was to be renamed Duo Bank of Canada, to be styled simply as Duo Bank. Though exact ownership percentages were never revealed in either company announcement, it has also since been revealed that Duo Bank was reclassified as a Schedule 1 (domestic, deposit-taking) federally chartered bank of the Bank Act in Canada from the Schedule 2 (foreign-owned or -controlled, deposit-taking).

In 2015, Walmart Canada disabled their online photo site, blaming a third party vendor, believed to be PNI Digital Media. Walmart's shutdown was followed shortly after by other companies suspending their photo site whilst an investigation took place. In common with other potential victims there was no confirmation or denial about whether hackers had stolen customer photographs as well as data and payment information. In September 2018, Walmart Canada began offering same-day delivery at some of its locations through a partnership with Instacart. Later, on March 15, 2021, Walmart Canada announced that it would close six stores and spend over $500 million to renovate over 60 percent of its stores over the next five years. Following this, in the summer of 2023, Walmart opened a new, 13,000-square-metre (140,000 sq ft) supercentre in Montreal, raising the total number of Walmart locations in Canada to 403 as of December 2023. Additionally, the company also announced that it has invested nearly $1 billion in 2023 alone to renovate its stores, and launch its "Store of the Future" in Mississauga, Ontario.

== Stores ==
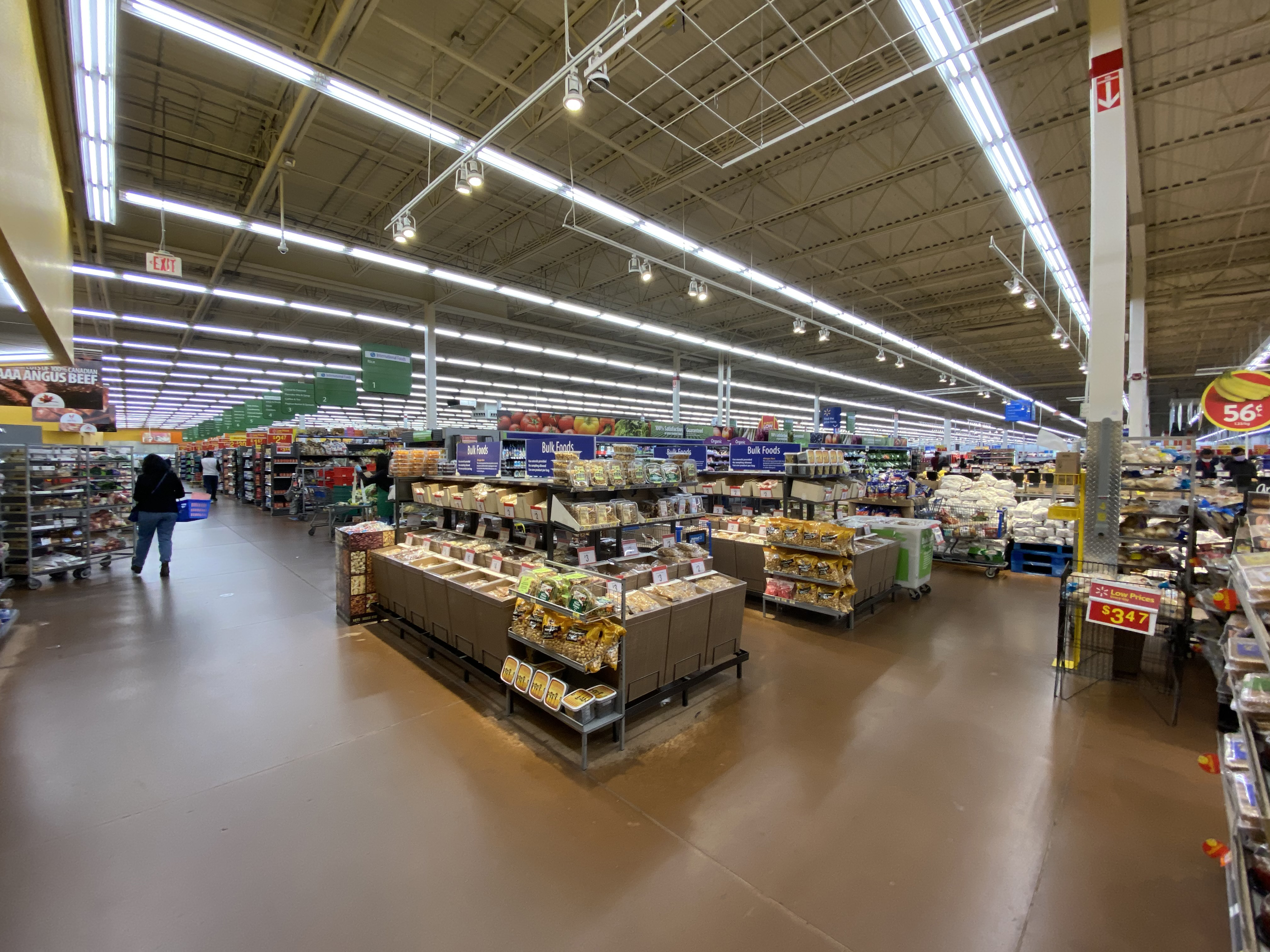
Walmart interior in Heartland Town Centre, Mississauga, Ontario

Since 1994, many of the shopping centres in which Walmart is located have been developed by SmartCentres (originally known as First Pro), a real estate company founded by Mitchell Goldhar. At present, Smartcentres is the landlord for approximately 100 Walmarts in Canada. Beginning in the fall of 2006, Walmart opened new Supercentres in Canadian cities. Walmart Canada also operated Sam's Club stores in Ontario from 2003 to 2009. On February 26, 2009, they announced that it would close all six of its Canadian Sam's Club locations. This was part of Walmart Canada's decision to shift focus towards Supercentre stores, but some industry observers suggested that the operation was struggling to compete with Costco and the non-membership Real Canadian Superstore (known as Maxi & Cie in Quebec).

In June 2005, Vancouver City Council voted 8–3 to reject Wal-Mart's proposal to build its first store in the city, a 143,000-square-foot (13,300 m^{2}) store on Southeast Marine Drive. All eight Coalition of Progressive Electors (COPE) councillors against the project, while Mayor Larry Campbell and Non-Partisan Association (NPA) councillors, Sam Sullivan and Peter Ladner, were in favour. Wal-Mart's proposed store was designed by local architect Peter Busby for sustainable development, with windmills generating power and underground wells heating and cooling the building which would consume 1/3 the energy of a normal store, and it was endorsed by city planners and staffers. Councillor Anne Roberts stated that her opposition was due to potential traffic and congestion that the store would bring to south Vancouver, although she later remarked "I'm not a fan of Wal-Mart, and I've always been concerned about their labour practices, about getting goods from sweatshops".

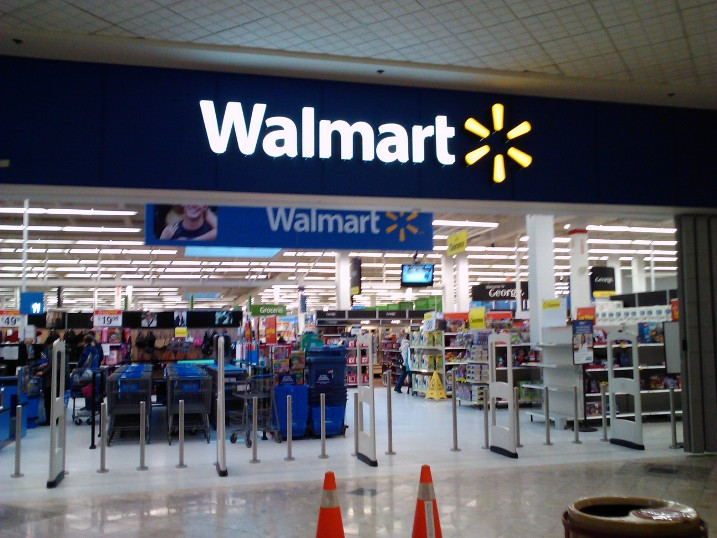
Former Zellers store in Gloucester in Ottawa, Ontario, in February 2013

In 2011, Walmart Canada acquired the leases of 39 Zellers stores from Target, originally one of the 189 leaseholds purchased from Hudson's Bay Company and slated for conversion to Target Canada stores. Walmart Canada managed to convert and reopen some of the former Zellers stores before Target Canada's launch. Unlike Walmart's 1994 move into Canada, Walmart Canada this time did not guarantee the jobs of the employees whose stores it was acquiring.

Walmart Canada launched the "Urban 90" format in 2012, a set of smaller Supercentres averaging 90,000 sq ft (8,400 m^{2}). On May 8, 2015, following the bankruptcy of Target Canada, Walmart Canada announced its intent to acquire 13 former Target locations, along with its distribution centre in Cornwall, Ontario subject to court approval. These locations included an unopened location at the Bayshore Shopping Centre in Ottawa.

In 2022, Walmart opened a technology hub in Toronto in the CBC Broadcast Centre. In 2024, Walmart announced the closure of the hub and relocation of staff to U.S. locations including Bentonville; layoffs were pending for those not relocating.

=== Supercentres ===
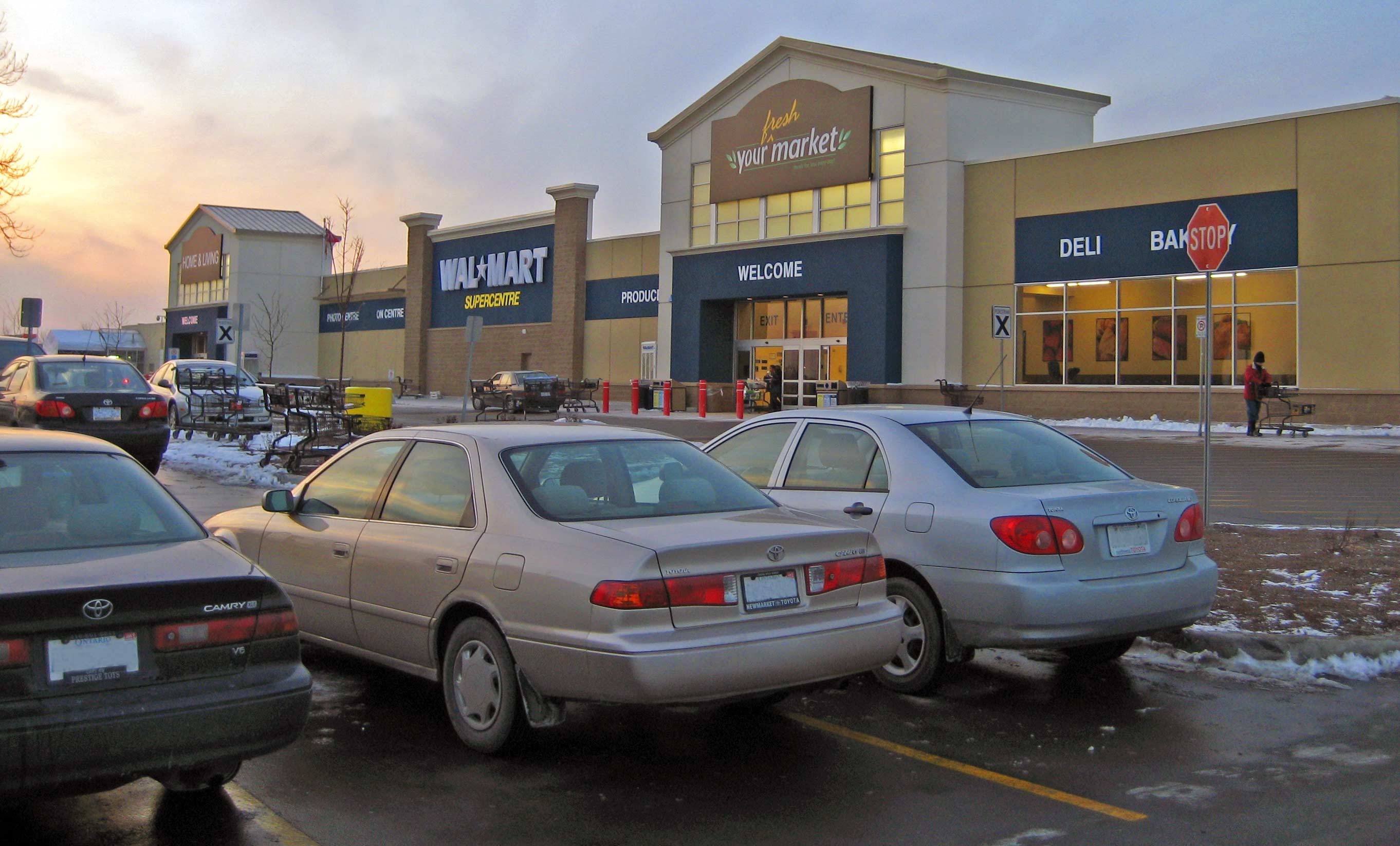
Walmart Supercentre in Vaughan, Ontario

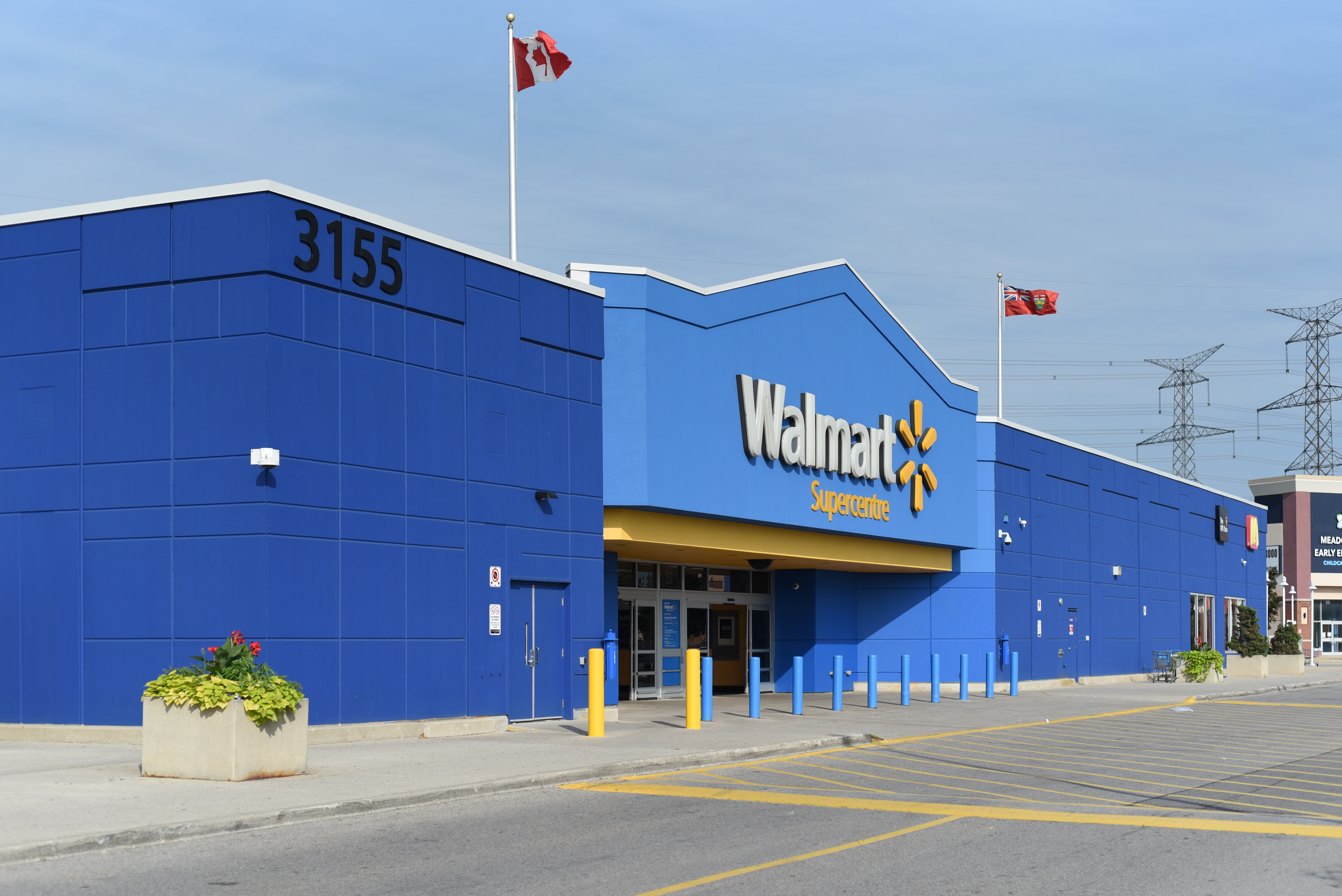
Walmart Supercentre in Mississauga

Logo used from 2009 until 2026

Logo used for stores in Quebec from 2009 until 2025

Logo used for stores in Quebec since 2025

Alternate version of the logo from above without yellow "Supercentre" text, first introduced in 2026

With the success of both Walmart in Canada and Walmart Supercenters in the United States, it was announced in late 2005 that the Supercentre concept would be arriving in Canada. On November 8, 2006, Canada's first three Supercentres opened in Ancaster, London, and Stouffville, all in Ontario. Alberta became the second province with Supercentres in September 2007. The first Supercentre in Vancouver, British Columbia opened in January 2009 in a former Costco/Price Club location, which moved to a new larger site nearby in Burnaby.

Walmart Supercentres in Canada range from 67,000 to 225,000 square feet (6,200 to 20,900 m^{2}), with the largest Walmart in Canada being the flagship Canadian Walmart Supercentre located at Square One Shopping Centre in Mississauga, Ontario. Walmart Supercentres stock everything a Walmart Discount Store does, but also include a full-service grocery, including meat and poultry, baked goods, delicatessen, frozen foods, dairy products, garden produce, and fresh seafood. Many Walmart Supercentres also feature a garden centre, pet shop, pharmacy, optical centre, one-hour photo processing lab, portrait studio, a clinic and numerous alcove shops, such as cellular phone stores, hair and nail salons, video rental stores (including Redbox rental kiosks), local bank branches, and fast food outlets. In 2008, Walmart Canada Bank launched its application for banking licence to compete with similar stores in Canada such as Loblaw.

=== Discount stores ===
Walmart Discount Stores are discount department stores varying in size from 51,000 to 150,000 sq ft (4,738.1 to 13,935.5 m^{2}), with the average store covering about 102,000 sq ft (9,476.1 m^{2}). They carry general merchandise and a selection of dried goods. Many of these stores also have a garden centre, pharmacy, medical clinic, Tire & Lube Express, optical centre, one-hour photo processing lab, cell phone store and fast food outlet, with the usually a McDonald's. Walmart Discount Stores carry limited grocery items, which are limited mostly to dried goods. Some former Zellers locations were converted to Walmart Discount Stores after acquiring the leasing rights for 39 stores.

== Unionization ==
Like its American parent, Walmart Canada has been criticized for discouraging unionization. As of 2013, there are no unionized Walmart Canada stores. A Walmart store in Windsor was unionized in 1997, but workers dissolved the union three years later after it failed to sign a contract with management. On August 15, 2013, the Supreme Court of Canada upheld the decision for Weyburn employees to dissolve their union, as they had voted 51–5 to decertify United Food and Commercial Workers (UHCW) as their representative.

=== Quebec ===
The UHCW had previously been unsuccessful in unionizing Walmarts in most of North America, but was able to use some of Quebec's union-friendly laws to its advantage. These laws permit card check organizing and mandates arbitration if the two sides fail to reach a contract. The UFCW promoted union card-signing over secret votes to prevent Walmart from using "intimidation tactics". Quebec's labour relations board ordered Walmart Canada to stop intimidating and harassing cashiers at a store in Sainte-Foy (near Quebec City) in the midst of an organizing drive. Walmart closed their Saguenay store in April 2005 after workers unionized and days before contract settlement by binding arbitration, putting 190 employees out of work. Walmart argued that the store was not profitable and the Supreme Court of Canada affirmed 6–3 on November 27, 2009, that the company had the legal right to close the store.

There was successful unionization by the UFCW of a Walmart store in Jonquière. Walmart closed the store, claiming it to be unprofitable. In September 2005, the Quebec Labour Board ruled that the closing of a Walmart store amounted to a reprisal against unionized workers and has ordered additional hearings on possible compensation for the employees, though it offered no details. Union organizers suggested that Walmart was making an example of the Jonquière store to pressure workers at other locations not to unionize. The case went to the Supreme Court of Canada in 2014, which ruled that Walmart had violated the Quebec Labour Code and fined the company.

At the Saint-Hyacinthe Walmart, 200 employees had organized successfully in January 2005. Contract negotiations stalled and an arbitrator was called in, reaching a two-year deal on April 9, 2009. The contract was seen largely as a Pyrrhic victory for the UFCW, as the arbitrator portrayed "Walmart as at least as good an employer—even a superior employer—compared with other retailers", noting that Walmart workers were paid more than their counterparts at Zellers. The union's calls for wage and benefit increases were all rejected, particularly their demand for an automatic-progression annual wage scales, as that would have conflicted with the company-wide annual performance evaluation, a key component of Walmart's business model. The arbitrator awarded existing workers (but not new hires) a small wage gain of 30¢ an hour to prevent them from being "impoverished" by dues paid to a union that failed to justify wages increases to the arbitrator. In 2011, the Saint-Hyacinthe Walmart employees voted (147 out of 250) to decertify UFCW as their representative union; employees believed that the 2009 contract was tilted strongly in favour of their employer. Walmart employees in Gatineau joined the UFCW in 2008. This was followed by two years of stalled negotiations before an arbitrator imposed a collective agreement. In November 2011, after one year with their collective agreement, the 150 Wal-Mart employees voted to decertify.

== See also ==
- Criticism of Walmart
