= Happy Returns (company) =

American logistics company

Happy Returns LLC
- Type: Subsidiary
- Industry: Product return Logistics; E-commerce; Shopping
- Founded: 2015; 11 years ago
- Headquarters: Los Angeles, California, U.S.
- Area served: United States
- Key people: David Sobie, CEO; Mark Geller, CPO; Juan Hernandez Campos, COO
- Parent: PayPal (2021–2023); UPS (2023–present)
- Website: happyreturns.com

Happy Returns LLC is an American software and reverse logistics company that works with online merchants to handle product returns. Purchased items can be returned in person without boxes or labels at third-party locations known as "Return Bars" including The UPS Store, Staples Inc., and Ulta Beauty stores, with specific locations searchable on Happy Returns’ website. Consumers can receive their refunds without packaging items, printing and affixing labels, or waiting for mailed packages to reach their destination.

The company facilitates returns for many brands, including Levi's, Revolve, Everlane, Lands' End, Gymshark. Amazon later developed a similar program in conjunction with Kohl's stores to accommodate its shoppers.

Happy Returns aggregates and ships returns from its return locations to warehouse hubs, where returns are sorted, processed, and dispositioned, and then bulk shipped back to merchant warehouses. Waste is reduced because shoppers do not need to use a new box to ship out returns.

== History ==
David Sobie and Mark Geller co-founded Happy Returns in July 2015. The two met at NordstromRack.com/HauteLook, where they created and launched a similar program enabling shoppers to return online purchases to physical stores. Happy Returns opened its first Return Bar location in April 2016.

In June 2021, Happy Returns was acquired by PayPal.

In October 2023, Happy Returns was acquired by UPS from PayPal for $455 million.
