= Staples Inc. =

American multinational office supply retailing corporation

- Logo since 2019

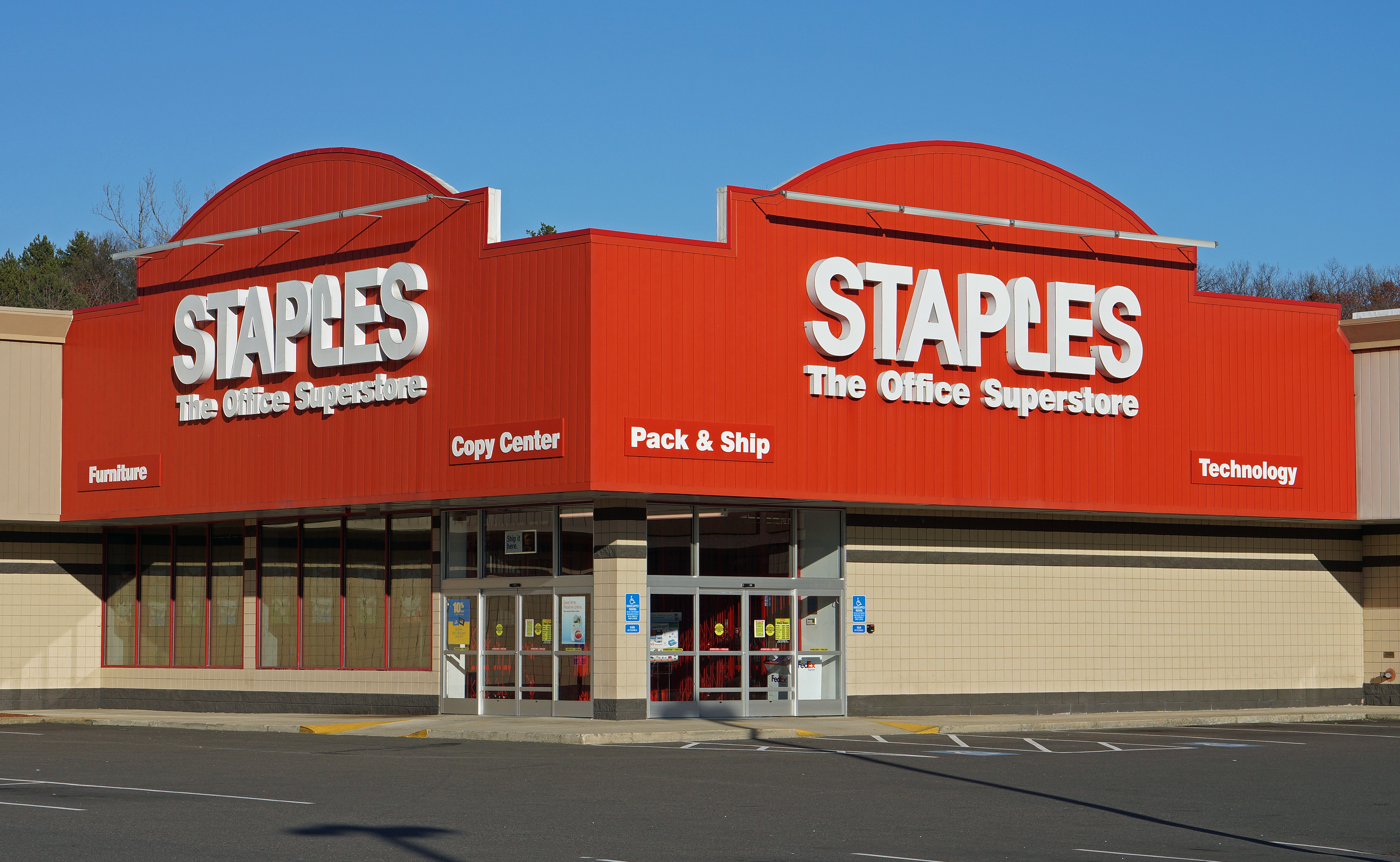
- Store in Saugus, Massachusetts, November 2012
- Type: Private
- Industry: Retail
- Founded: May 1, 1986; 40 years ago Brighton, Massachusetts, U.S.
- Founders: Thomas G. Stemberg; Leo Kahn; Myra Hart
- Headquarters: 500 Staples Drive, Framingham, Massachusetts, U.S.
- Number of locations: 827 stores (U.S., 2026); 40 warehouses/fulfillment centers (U.S.)
- Areas served: United States, Canada
- Key people: Rachel Huckle (CEO Staples); Michael Motz (CEO Staples US Retail)
- Products: Office supplies and furniture Office and data center technology
- Revenue: ▼US$8 billion (2024)
- Owner: Sycamore Partners (2017–present)
- Number of employees: 12,000 (2024)
- Subsidiaries: Quill Corporation; PNI Digital Media; HiTouch Business Services
- Website: staples.com

Staples's logo until 2019

Staples Inc. is an American office supply retail company headquartered in Framingham, Massachusetts.

Founded by Leo Kahn and Thomas G. Stemberg, the company opened its first store in Brighton, Massachusetts, on May 1, 1986. By 1996, it reached the Fortune 500, and it later acquired the office supplies company Quill Corporation. In 2014, in the wake of increasing competition from e-commerce market, Staples began to close some locations. In 2015, Staples announced its intent to acquire Office Depot and OfficeMax. However, the purchase was blocked under antitrust grounds due to the consolidation that would result.

After the failed acquisition, Staples refocused its operations to downplay its brick-and-mortar outlets and place more prominence on business-to-business (B2B) services. In 2017, after its sale to a private equity firm, Sycamore Partners, the company was effectively split into three "independently managed and capitalized" entities sharing the Staples name, separating its U.S. retail operations, and Canadian retail operations, from the B2B business.

== History ==
Staples was founded by Leo Kahn and Thomas G. Stemberg, who were former rivals in the New England retail supermarket industry, and Myra Hart.

The idea for Staples originated in 1985, while Stemberg was working on a proposal for a different business. He needed a ribbon for his printer, but could not obtain one because his local dealer was closed for the Independence Day holiday. A frustration with the reliance on small stores for critical supplies combined with Stemberg's background in the grocery business led to a vision for an office supply superstore.

The first store was opened in the Brighton neighborhood of Boston in 1986. Staples started with backing from private equity firms including Bain Capital; Bain co-founder Mitt Romney served on the company's board of directors for the next fifteen years, helping shape their business model.

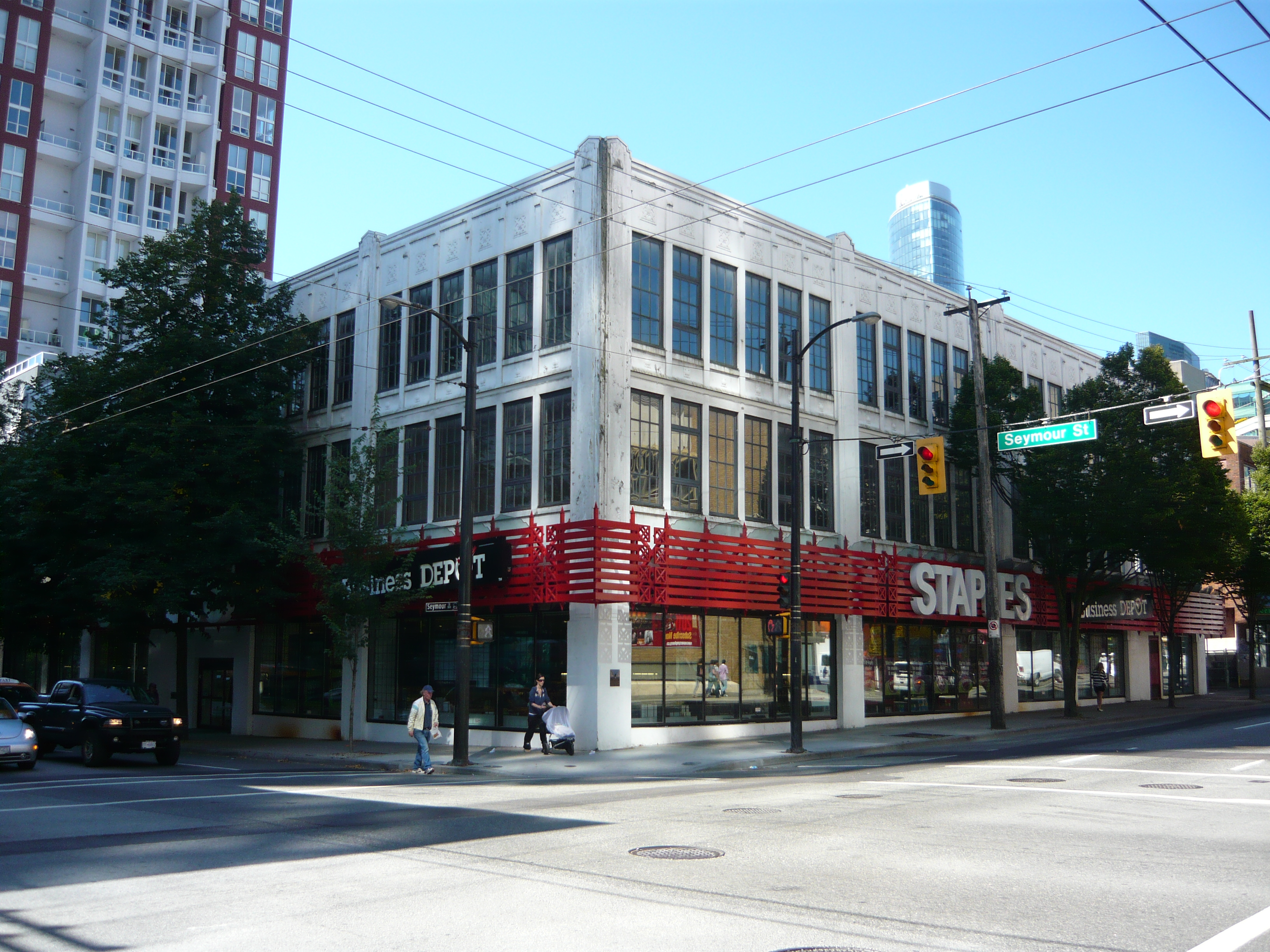
A Staples Business Depot located in a heritage building in Vancouver, British Columbia, in September 2011

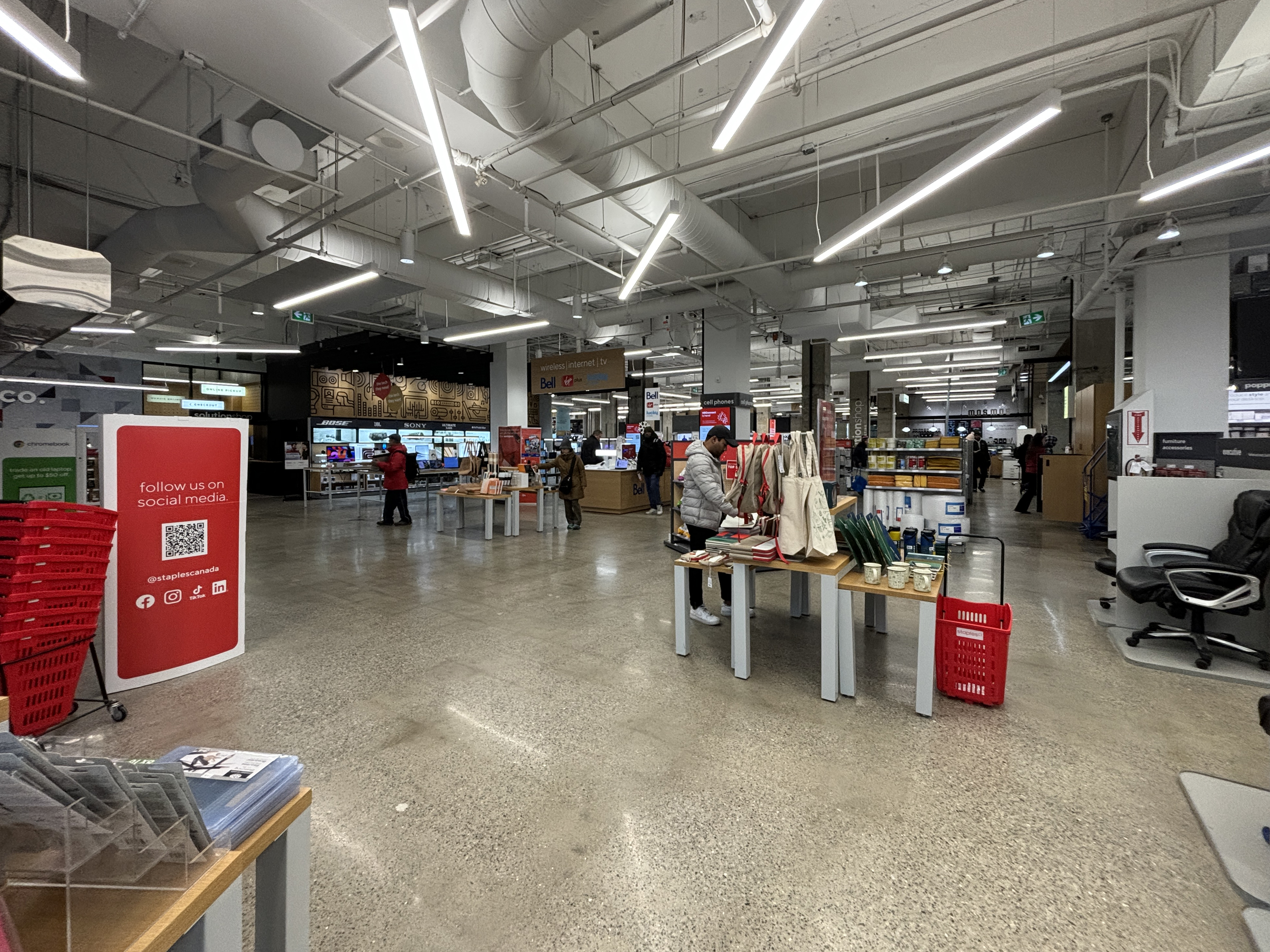
Staples in Downtown Toronto

In 1991, Staples founded its Canadian subsidiary, the Business Depot, and began opening stores under that name, though over a decade later, all stores were renamed as "Staples". The first store opened in Vaughan, Ontario, north of Toronto. The following year, Staples began expanding into Europe, and opened its first British store in Swansea.

On September 4, 1996, Staples and Office Depot announced plans to merge. The Federal Trade Commission determined that the merged company would unfairly increase office supply prices despite competition from OfficeMax, because OfficeMax had no stores in many local markets the merger would affect. Staples argued that chains such as Walmart and Circuit City represented significant competition, but this argument did little to sway the FTC. Following the denial of the merger by the FTC, a rivalry formed between the two companies.

Staples acquired the naming rights for the Staples Center in Los Angeles shortly before construction began in 1998. Staples also acquired Quill Corporation, an online and catalog retailer of office supplies, for about $685 million in cash and stock. Between 1999 and 2001, Staples unsuccessfully attempted to enter the telecommunications business when it created Staples Communications after the purchase of Canada-based company Claricom from an investment group. The company was later sold to Platinum Equities and renamed NextiraOne.

In 2002, Staples acquired Medical Arts Press, which became a subsidiary of Quill.

In March 2005, Staples and Ahold announced a plan to include a Staples-branded store-within-store section in all Stop & Shop Supermarkets and Giant Food stores throughout the Northeast. In August 2006, Ahold announced the addition of the Staples section to all Tops Friendly Markets locations as well.

In 2008, Staples acquired Dutch office supplies company Corporate Express, one of the largest office supply wholesalers in the world.

On August 26, 2025, Staples announced its partnership with Now Optics (the operator of the Stanton Optical brand) to open full-service eye care offices in select locations inside Staples stores. The first few locations are set to be open during the fourth quarter of 2025 in Pennsylvania.

=== Attempted merger with Office Depot; sale of UK stores and European division ===
On March 6, 2014, Staples announced it would close up to 225 stores in North America by the end of 2015, in order to cut $500 million in costs annually, and focus more on e-commerce.

On February 4, 2015, Staples announced a plan to once again acquire Office Depot, which itself had recently acquired OfficeMax in a bid to compete against Staples. CEO Ron Sargent stated that this purchase would "[enable] Staples to provide more value to customers, and more effectively compete in a rapidly evolving competitive environment", and would result in at least $1 billion in "cost synergies" within three years.

It was reported that the deal could face antitrust scrutiny for its monopolization of the office supply market unless growing competition against online retailers is considered a factor as well. In December, the FTC filed a lawsuit to halt the merger, arguing it would harm competition in the commercial office supply market. and as of January 2016, the FTC has not changed its stance.

At the end of January 2016, Staples announced it would lay off hundreds of workers at its headquarters. Some analysts saw the layoffs as a preemptive tactic in case the merger did not receive regulatory approval from the Federal Trade Commission. On May 10, 2016, the U.S. District Court for the District of Columbia granted the FTC a preliminary injunction against the merger. As a result, the sale was called off, and Staples was required to pay a $250 million breakup fee.

In November 2016, it was announced that Staples had sold its 106 British stores to Hilco Capital for a "nominal" amount, as part of an effort to streamline its international operations following the failed merger. Hilco stated that it would discontinue the Staples brand in the region; the stores were rebranded as "Office Outlet", a new brand retaining the Staples chain's red and white color scheme. In August 2018, the chain closed some stores under a company voluntary arrangement, and underwent a management buyout the following month. In March 2019, Office Outlet went into administration, citing that it had "recently experienced a reduction in credit from key suppliers, given the economic outlook which has severely impacted the financial position of the company."

In December 2016, it was announced that Staples entered into an agreement with PE firm Cerberus Capital Management on the sale of Staples Europe which at the time represented about EUR 1.7B in revenue. The deal was formally closed on 28 February 2017..

=== Pivot to B2B and sale to Sycamore Partners ===
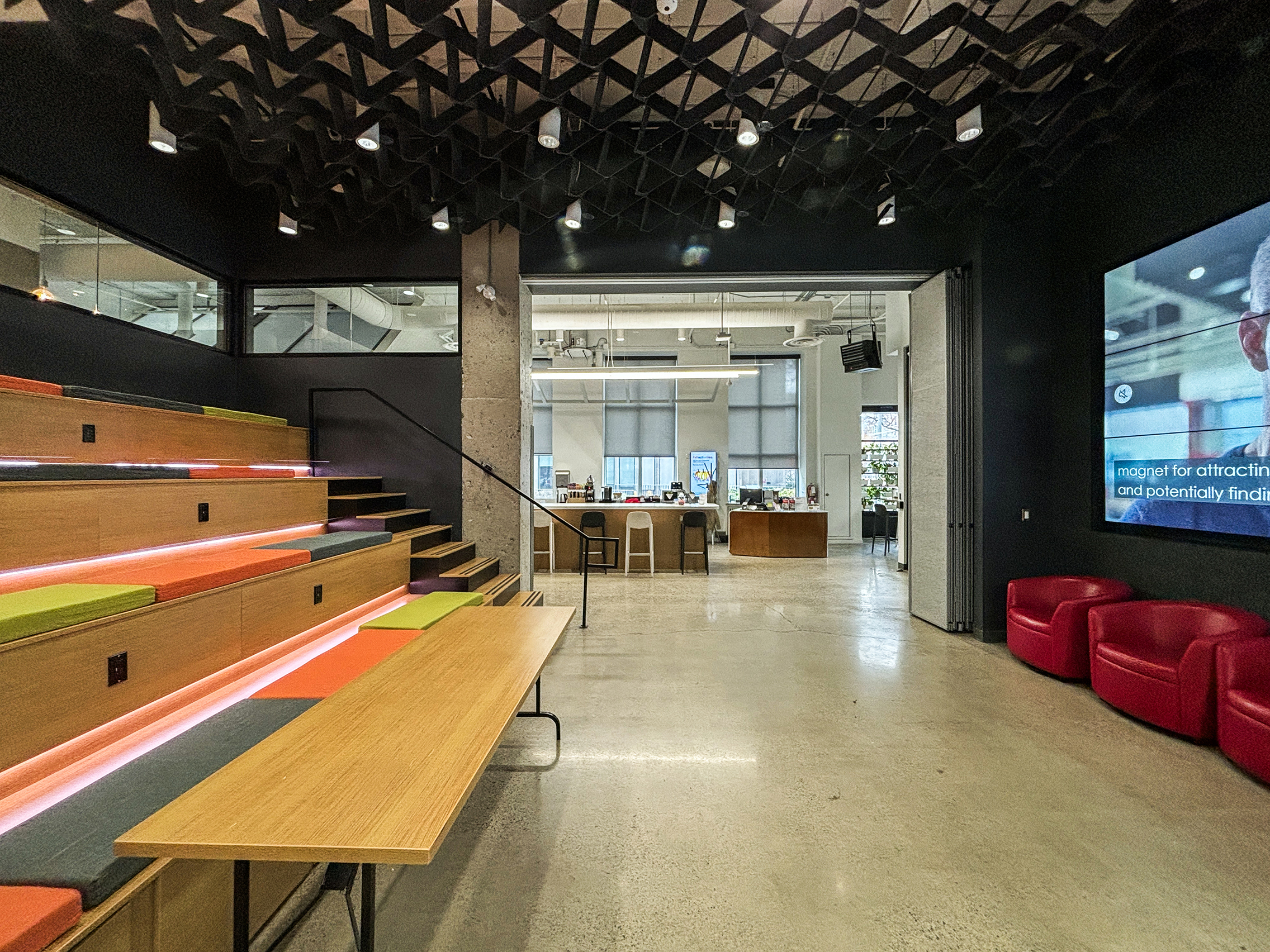
Staples Studio in Downtown Toronto

Following the aborted acquisition of Office Depot, Staples began to reposition its operations by promoting itself as a "solutions partner" for the business market, and placing a stronger focus on its B2B-oriented delivery and e-commerce businesses. In May 2017, the chain began a new advertising campaign with the slogan "It's Pro Time", which largely downplayed its retail operations.

In 2017, Sycamore Partners acquired Staples for $6.9 billion, of which $1.6 billion was funded as equity, with the remaining deal value raised as debt. As part of the purchase, Sycamore implemented a major restructuring of the company, under which the chain's B2B business (Staples North American Delivery, also known as simply "Staples"), retail locations (Staples U.S. Retail), and Staples Canada would be split into three "independently managed and capitalized" entities under Sycamore.

On April 9, 2019, Sycamore Partners conducted a dividend recapitalization, refinancing $5.4 billion in debt against its ownership of Staples, producing a $1 billion one-time dividend for the private equity firm. A Bloomberg report on this refinancing noted that the deal allowed Sycamore to recover roughly 80% of its equity investment in Staples in less than two years, compared to the typical profit-taking exit timeframe of five to eight years for most private equity buyouts. That month, Staples also unveiled a new logo, which features an icon representing both an unused staple and an office desk. The company also announced that it would introduce a new line of store brands, including Tru Red, Coastwide Professional (facility supplies), NXT Technologies (technology accessories), Perk (office break room supplies), and Union & Scale (furniture), as well as a new catalog known as The Loop. With the rebranding, then CEO Sandy Douglas (who joined the company in 2018) stated that Staples was now being marketed as a "worklife fulfillment" company, which he explained was "about helping businesses of all sizes as they create the most dynamic and productive work environments for their teams."

The following month, CEO Mike Motz (who joined the company in 2019 to head Staples U.S. Retail) unveiled a new store concept known as "Staples Connect": it is aligned with a similar store concept being trialed by Staples Canada, featuring "Staples Studio" co-working areas and an auditorium-style "Spotlight" theater (which can be rented for sessions and events). The new concept will be trialed in the Boston area, while elements of the concept will be implemented chain-wide. As part of a partnership with radio broadcaster iHeartMedia, Staples also added recording studios intended for podcasting to six of these stores, with access to recording engineers and a partnership with Spreaker to offer discounted hosting and distribution services to its customers.

In January 2021, Staples announced that it would again try to buy Office Depot. Their offer was turned down in June 2022.

Joining several other retailers such as Kohl's and The UPS Store, in 2023 Staples began accepting returns for Amazon. Through this program, customers for Amazon can enter a Staples location and return their products and packages. Though this program has been discontinued at other retail stores due to the immense amount of strain it puts on employees, as well as a nearly complete lack of return for the hosting businesses, Staples continues to offer the service. A petition from over 5,000 Staples employees was signed asking for the company to stop the practice or to hire more workers to offset the never-ending deluge of Amazon returns, which has been described as "a retail horror story".

In addition to this, Staples also partnered with Happy Returns, Optoro's Express Returns, and UPS to offer return services for each of their online shopping merchants at Staples locations.

== Advertising ==
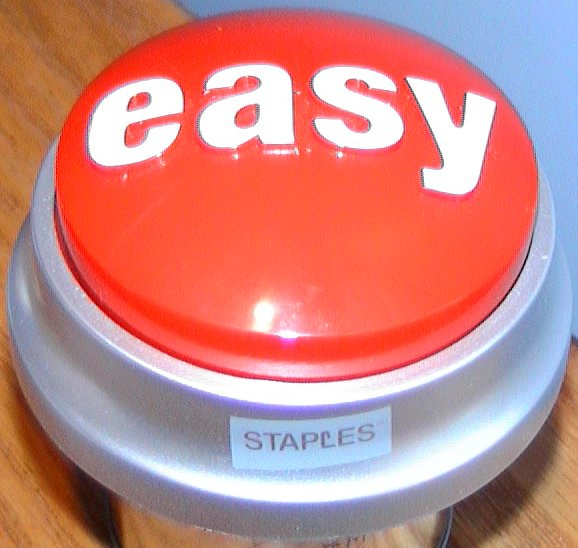
The easy button

Staples – "That was easy"
2 seconds

Throughout most of the company's history, Staples employed, in its American commercials and advertising promotions, the slogan "Yeah, we've got that.", signifying their wide selection of products. This slogan was retired in 2003, to be replaced with "That was easy". Expanding on that theme, 2005 adverts featured a large red push-button marked "easy". In the United Kingdom, Staples had used the slogan "You want it. We've got it"; this changed to "That was Easy".

=== The "Easy Button" ===
Originally, the "Easy Button" was only intended to be a fictitious button with 'magical' properties, featured in their television advertisement campaign. However, when the adverts appeared, customers began contacting the company to inquire how they could buy one. The company responded by making the "Easy Button" a real product (available in English "easy", French "simple", Spanish "fácil", German "einfach easy", and a multi-language version launched in 2013).

These buttons were shipped to stores in the United States, Canada and Germany starting in the fall of 2005. Sales of the buttons reached 1.5 million by the end of 2006.

=== The Staples Sno-Bot ===
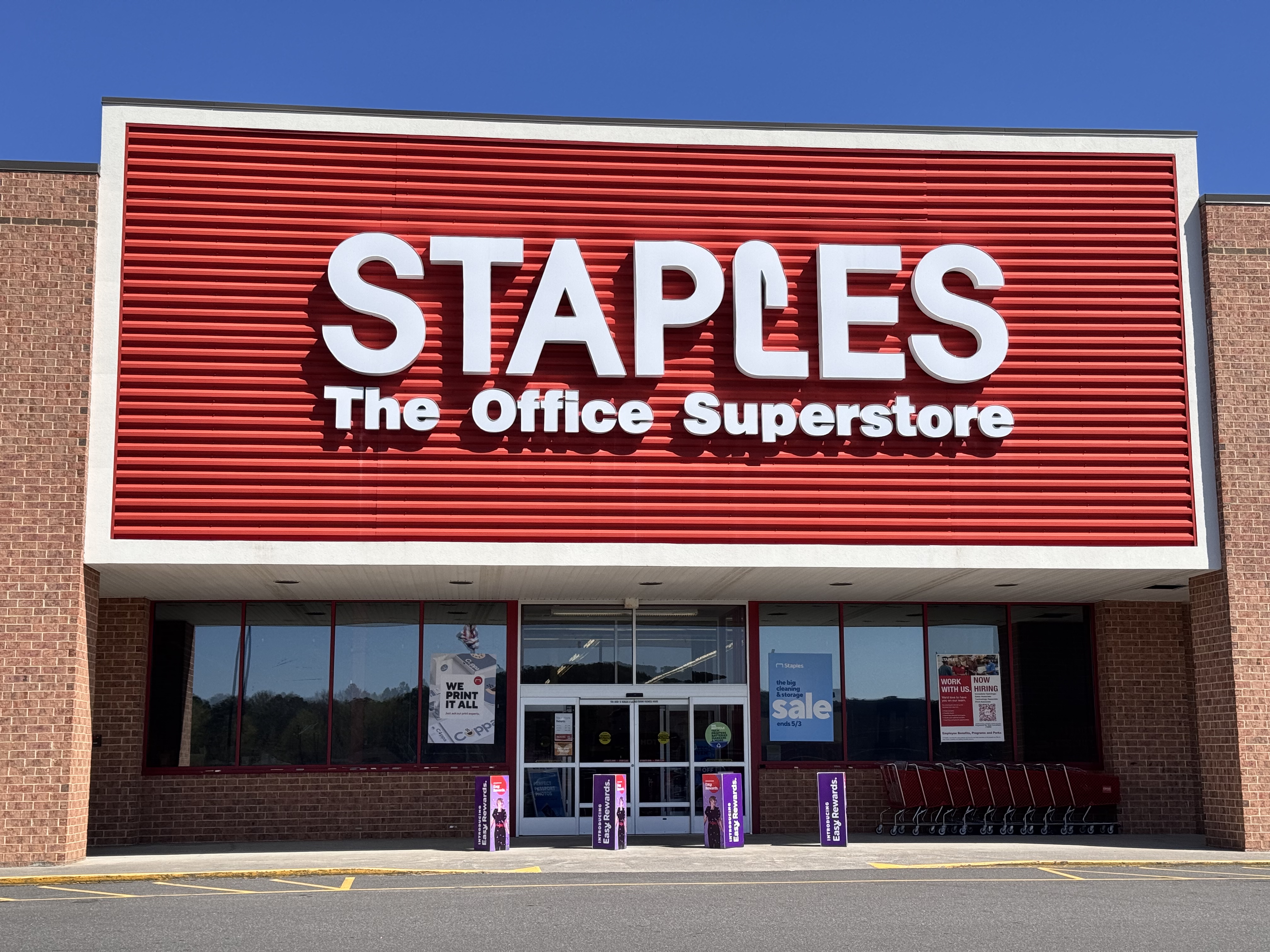
The typical design for a shopping center location. This location is in Clemmons, North Carolina.

The Staples Sno-Bot was an advertising character that appeared in the United States, in television and print advertising during the Christmas seasons from 1995 until 2001.

The Sno-Bot was a robot shaped like a snowman who refuses to let go of the inkjet printer he has fallen in love with. After the printer is wrestled from his grasp, the robot utters a monotone "Weeping. Weeping." He is consoled by a Staples employee who offers him a surge protector or a computer mouse (depending on the ad) instead.

=== Back-to-school ===
Another advertisement style is used during its annual back-to-school campaign, in which the Christmas song "It's the Most Wonderful Time of the Year" is played while a father joyously shops for school supplies for his sullen-faced children, used for several years from 1995 until 2005.

Later, Alice Cooper appeared in a back-to-school campaign from August 2004. Within the ad, a hand is seen selecting various supplies while a girl (played by Madeleine Martin) looks on unhappily. She finally says, "I thought you said, 'School's out forever.'" Alice is shown behind the cart, saying, "The song goes 'School's out for summer'. Nice try, though." The hit song then plays as supplies are shown. The tagline, "That was easy", is heard playing over the company logo, formed to resemble a stapler.

=== Other advertising ===
During the 2008 holiday season, Staples advertising for the first time engaged Facebook, Twitter, YouTube, and other social media platforms. The company created a character named "Coach Tom" to promote its "Gift it for Free" sweepstakes, in which 10,000 Staples customers won up to $5,000 in merchandise.

== Acquisitions and divestitures ==
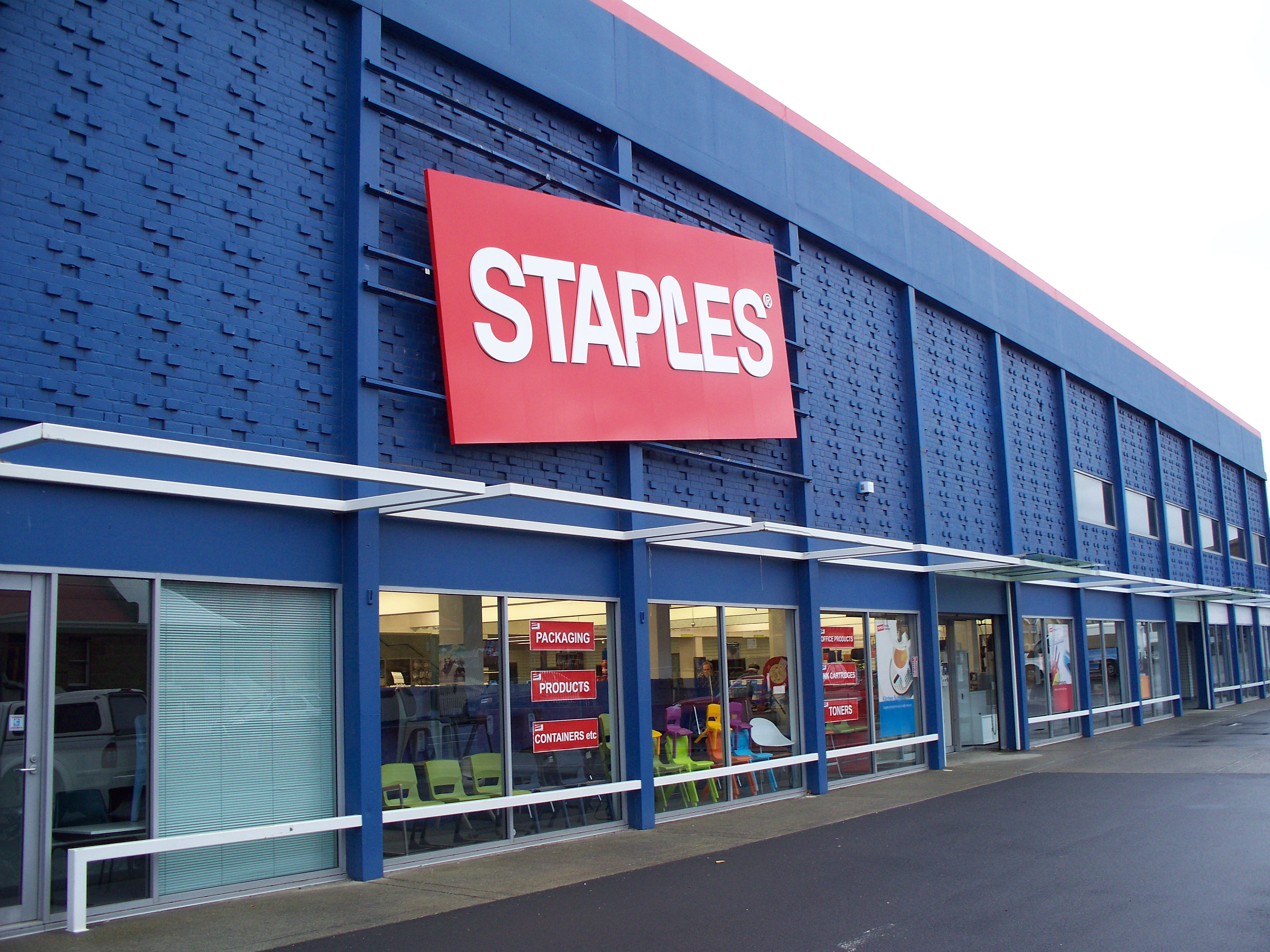
A Staples outlet in Campbell Street, Hobart, Australia, in June 2013. These former Corporate Express stores/distribution centers were rebranded in early 2013; however, some still retain that company's corporate colors.

The logo for Staples Canada

- 1992: Workplace stores based in Lakeland, Florida
- 1994: National Office Products based in Hackensack, New Jersey
- 1994: Spectrum Office Products based in Rochester, New York
- 1994: MacIsaac Office Products based in Canton, Massachusetts
- 1994: Philadelphia Stationers based in Philadelphia
- 1995: Macauley's Business Resources based in Canton, Michigan
- 1996: Staples Office Products based in Texas
- 1998: Quill Corporation, the largest mail order office supply retailer in the United States. Headquartered in Lincolnshire, Illinois, Quill offers products including school and office supplies, office machines, furniture, technology, cleaning and break room, as well as custom-printed and promotional products.
- 2002: Medical Arts Press, a United States supplier of front office and exam-room products for healthcare facilities.
- 2004: United Kingdom–based chain Office World, owned by Globus Group.
- 2006: Chiswick, which distributes industrial and retail packaging, shipping and warehouse products to thousands of small and mid–sized manufacturers, distributors and retailers throughout the United States and Canada. The company offers over 7,500 industrial and retail packaging and shipping products, and their product line includes a wide variety of polyethylene bags, corrugated boxes, tape, labels, protective packaging, mailers, retail shopping bags and related packaging supplies. Sales channels include Catalog/Direct Mail, the Internet and Outside Sales. It is now branded as Staples Industrial.
- 2007: Thrive Networks, an IT services company that provides IT support to small and mid–level businesses.
- 2007: American Identity, one of the largest global distributors of corporate branded merchandise. American Identity has since been re-branded as Staples Promotional Products.
- 2008: Corporate Express, a Dutch company that supplies office products to businesses and institutions. The firm was known as Buhrmann prior to April 20, 2007, when it changed its trading name to that of its best known brand, taken from the United States–based corporation it acquired in 1999. The company was acquired by Staples Inc. in August 2008, and has been integrated into the Staples Advantage brand.
- 2010: Miami Systems, a commercial printing company based in Cincinnati, Ohio, with 250 employees.
- 2014: PNI Digital Media, a Canadian software maker that powers in-store kiosks for printing photographs, calendars and wedding invitations. Staples spent $67.3 million in an all-cash deal for this acquisition.
- 2016: Staples divested its Australian and New Zealand branches as part of a strategic shift to focus on its US-based retail store format. The company's Australian and New Zealand businesses were rebranded as Winc. In May 2016, a proposed $6.3 billion merger between Staples and key rival Office Depot was successfully blocked by the Federal Trade Commission.
- 2017: Staples divested its entire European business as part of the same shift to focus on its US-based retail store format.
- 2018: HiTouch Business Services, offering office supplies, workspace design services and IT solutions.
- 2019: Essendant, a national wholesale distributor of office supplies, and DEX Imaging, an independent document imaging technology dealer in the United States.
- 2020: Staples acquired Montana office supply company 360 Office Solutions. 360 has locations in the following Montana cities Billings, Bozeman, Butte, Great Falls and Helena, Montana.
- 2023: Staples Canada acquired Ontario office supply company Beatties Stationery.

== Community relations ==
In August 2002, the company started the Staples Foundation for Learning, which supports youth groups and education. It also is a partner of Boys & Girls Clubs of America, Ashoka, Earth Force, Initiative for a Competitive Inner City, Hispanic Heritage Foundation and through Staples, ReadBoston.

In August 2005, Staples introduced the "Easy Button", a novelty item for offices which is advertised as a fun way of relieving stress. The button does nothing other than say "That was easy" when pressed. The first US$1 million of profits each year from the Easy Button are donated to the Boys & Girls Clubs of America. As of December 2006, it was sold for $4.99 to $6.99 in all US and Canadian stores (where profits go to Special Olympics in Canada) and on the company's website. Donations also went to the Children's Fund. Staples has reportedly sold more than $7.5 million worth of Easy Buttons.

== Environmental record ==
Staples is ranked in the top 25 of EPA's Green Power Partner list. In 2006, Staples offered more than 2,900 different office products incorporating recycled content.

Staples is currently trying to pursue developing Staples brand products with green raw materials. In response to a two-year campaign targeting the company, Staples adopted an environmentally friendly paper policy, in hopes of increasing the amount of post-consumer recycled paper made available for sale, phasing out products originating from endangered forests.

The Hanover, Maryland fulfillment center is powered by a 1.01 megawatt solar installation covering nearly 175,000 square feet (16,300 m^{2}) of roof space. Its Savi Ranch store in Yorba Linda, California also has a sizeable rooftop solar installation. Staples has also recently implemented power reduction strategies in all of their Copy & Print Centers, where the copiers enter sleep mode in as little as 15 minutes after use.

This technique will save Staples nearly $1 million a year in reduced energy costs and prevent over 11 million pounds of carbon dioxide from being released into the atmosphere. In November 2014, Staples partnered with EnergySage to give Staples giftcards to homeowners and businesses that installed solar panels.

=== Recycling ===
Staples accepts all used ink and toner cartridges for recycling. Before 2008, the only recyclable cartridge brands were HP, Kodak, and Dell, and customers were given a $3 store coupon, with the maximum number of coupons given or redeemable at any one time being 25. Since 2009, ink recycling has been a part of the Staples Rewards program.

Staples now pays two dollars (Staples.com) on all ink cartridges and toners as of July 2010. Ink recycling credit comes to Rewards members as a separate coupon, monthly, instead of the normal quarterly rewards check. Most customers can trade in ten per month for credit, whilst Staples Plus and Premier Rewards members may trade in twenty per month.

As of February 28, 2013, Staples announced that to receive $2 per ink cartridge recycled, customers must make at least $30 of ink purchases at Staples within 180 days of recycling.. In 2025, this has been reduced to a maximum of $6 per month for up to six ink or toner cartridges.

== Price discrimination ==
A 2012 study by The Wall Street Journal found that Staples displayed different prices to customers in different locations (distinct from shipping prices), based on proximity to competitors like OfficeMax and Office Depot. This generally resulted in higher prices for customers in more rural areas, who were on average less wealthy than customers seeing lower prices.

== Security breaches ==
KrebsOnSecurity reported a suspected breach at Staples on October 20, 2014, after learning multiple banks had identified a pattern of card fraud (suggesting that several Staples office supply locations in the Northeastern United States were dealing with a data breach). At the time, Staples would say only that it was investigating "a potential issue" and had contacted law enforcement.

On December 19, 2014, Staples reported that criminals had deployed malware to point-of-sale systems at 115 of its retail stores in the United States. At 113 stores, the malware may have allowed access to this data for purchases made between August 10 and September 16, 2014. At two stores, the malware may have allowed access to data from purchases made between July 20 and September 16, 2014. Overall, the company believed that approximately 1.16 million payment cards may have been affected.

On July 14, 2015, numerous news outlets started to report a suspected data breach at retailers served by online photo software from PNI – Staples' recent acquisition. The first reported victim was Walmart Canada, followed by CVS, Rite-Aid, Costco US, Costco Canada, and Tesco UK.

In late 2023, Staples experienced a cyberattack that disrupted its online ordering system for several days. The exact method of attack was not revealed, and the company only stated it would notify customers as legally required if data was stolen.

In October 2023, a "sophisticated organized crime gang" in China hacked into Staples computer system, stealing five million dollars in gift cards from the retailer. The stolen gift cards were subsequently redeemed at various retail outlets, including Target, Sephora and Lowe's.

== Store layout ==
=== Print and marketing services ===
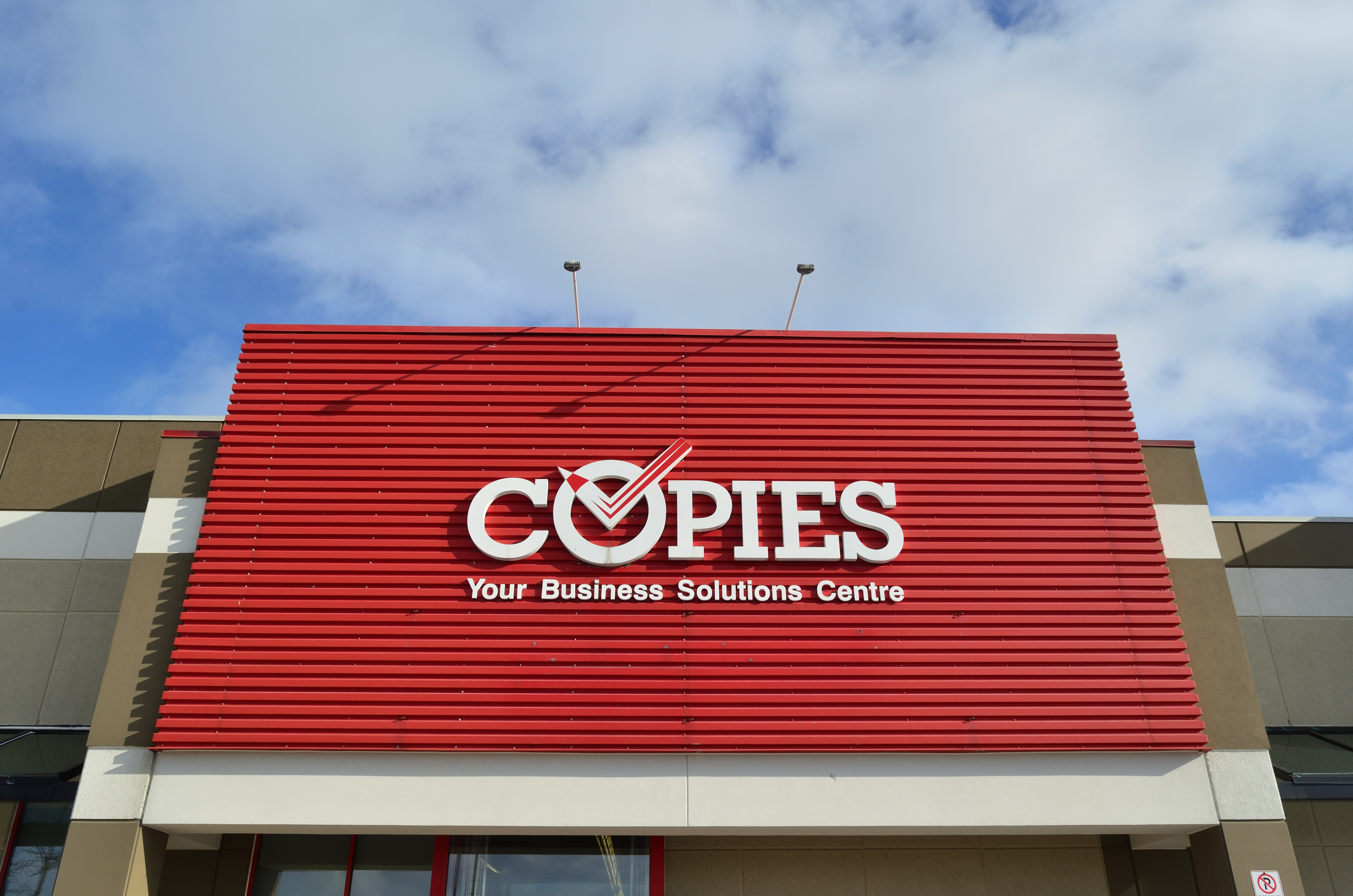
Staples copy and print center

In addition to selling office supplies, business machines, and tech services, Staples also offers a copy and print center for photocopies, scans, digital printing, faxing, custom business cards, custom rubber stamps, promotional products, binding, lamination, folding, cutting and engraved products. While many products can be produced in-store, larger, more complex jobs, or jobs requiring special materials such as PVC signs are routed to production facilities in various locations through the country.

Most US locations have a limited service UPS shipping center offering air and ground services, as well as USPS labelled package dropoff service. Canadian stores offer three providers (Canada Post, FedEx, and Purolator), which include international shipping; in US stores, this service is limited to Canada and Mexico.

In Canada, most web submission jobs and larger orders, including business cards, posters and books are produced in a central production facility in each region. The production facilities operate on a 24-hour basis and orders are shipped to most of the stores within its regions within a day. The regions in Canada are BC/Yukon, Alberta/NWT, Saskatchewan, Ontario, Quebec, and Maritime. The Copy & Print Center was also the first Print Center to offer custom business cards printed in store. Known as 'Instant Business Cards' customers can have custom business cards in a matter of hours. Staples also operates stand-alone Print & Marketing Stores (currently there are four New York City locations, and one in Salem, Massachusetts) where Print & Marketing Services is a brand of Staples.

=== Tech services ===
Some stores also feature Staples Tech Services (formerly EasyTech) an in-store and on-site service for PC repair, home and office networking setup, and PC tutorials.

Starting in November 2005, Staples began a test called "Heavy Up" primarily using stores in New York state to experiment with the expansion of the offerings by the Staples Tech Center. A subsequent test known as "Double Up" was planned for an unspecified test market and was scheduled to begin the first half of 2006. The tests ran to promote competition with Best Buy's Geek Squad and Circuit City's Fire dog.

Beginning in early 2006, Staples also launched the "Easy Resident Tech" program, employing one to two resident computer repair technicians to do in-store repair during normal business hours.

On January 30, 2007, Staples launched Staples EasyTech. The launch rebranded the "Easy Mobile Tech" name with plans to install an 11' x 17' kiosk in every store. The kiosk may vary from store to store depending on its size and volume. Most kiosks take up part of the Customer Service desk. Within the kiosk, Easy Resident Techs offered repair service as well as sold products. These technicians wore gray "Easy Tech" polo shirts to distinguish them from regular Staples workers. While there was typically one tech per store, a second tech may have been employed for high-volume stores.

Beginning in July 2008, Staples launched a new program labeling all technology workers as "EasyTechs". Under the new guidelines all technology workers are required to have the skills necessary to perform basic services such as memory installation and PC configuration. In addition, all technology workers wear black polo shirts with green "EasyTech" emblems to set them apart from other store workers. The change was due to the company's new focus on services, allowing more customers to be assisted in less time. Most stores will still have a main "EasyTech" who performs most of the more complex tasks.

Beginning in November 2008, eleven concept stores featuring a broader array of small business technology services were launched, which are known within the company as Best Tech stores. EasyTechs and sales workers were now referred to as "Tech Advisors" and "Solutions Advisors". The concept stores carry many more technology related products such as digital signage, small business servers, NAS (Network Attached Storage), and business networking. Staples also partnered with an on demand IT service provider, with such services as network monitoring, advanced network configurations, and server setup.

These concept stores are mainly based in New Hampshire, with stores in Nashua, Seabrook, West Lebanon, Dover and Concord. Some stores with this new concept also opened in Massachusetts, including the Auburn store. Other existing stores have been renovated to include Best Tech's services, including the Newington, Connecticut, and Natick store.

== See also ==
- Stationery
- Staples (Canada), known as Bureau en Gros in Québec.
- W. B. Mason
- Winc

== General and cited references ==
- Dalkir, S. and F. Warren-Boulton (2003). "Market Definition and the Price Effects of Mergers: Staples-Office Depot (1997)", in John E. Kwoka and Lawrence J. White, eds. The Antitrust Revolution: Economics, Competition and Policy, 4th edition. Oxford University Press.
