= Myra Hart =

American businesswoman

Myra M. Hart was a founding member of Staples Inc. She graduated from Cornell University with a B.A. in 1962 and an MBA from Harvard in 1981. She obtained a DBA from Harvard University in 1995. She was professor of entrepreneurship at Harvard Business School from 1995 to 2007. She is a founding scholar of the Diana Group, creators of the Diana Project, which resulted in her receiving the Global Award for Entrepreneurship Research in 2007.

== Biography ==
Hart was a founding member of Staples Inc., the office superstore. She served as professor of entrepreneurship at Harvard Business School until retiring in 2007. She co-authored four books and developed more than 60 Harvard Business School cases.

In 1999, Hart was elected to the Cornell board of trustees and serves on the investment committee and the Committee on Alumni Affairs and Development. She is a director of the National Foundation for Women Business Owners, on the corporate boards of directors of Kraft and Office Depot, and on the Board of Advisors of AbsolutelyNew Inc.. Hart is a member of the Boston Club and the MIT Enterprise Council.
