= Officeworks =

Australian office supply store chain owned by Wesfarmers

Officeworks Ltd.
- Type: Subsidiary
- Industry: Office supply retailing
- Founded: June 16, 1994; 32 years ago
- Headquarters: Chadstone, Melbourne, Australia
- Number of locations: 176 (2026)
- Key people: John Gualtieri (Managing Director)
- Revenue: ▲ A$3.57 billion (2025)
- Operating income: ▲ A$$231 million (2025)
- Total assets: ▲ A$2.040 billion (2022)
- Number of employees: 9,000+ (2022)
- Parent: Wesfarmers
- Divisions: Officeworks Retail and Flexiworks
- Website: www.officeworks.com.au

Officeworks is a chain of Australian office supplies stores operated under parent company Wesfarmers.

The company was established in 1994 by Coles Myer. Its head office is located in Chadstone, Melbourne. The store concept adopted by Officeworks was based on the US chain Office Depot.

As of June 2026, in Australia there are 4 stores in ACT, 52 stores in NSW, 1 store in NT, 34 stores in QLD, 10 stores in SA, 2 stores in TAS, 54 stores in VIC, and 19 stores in WA.

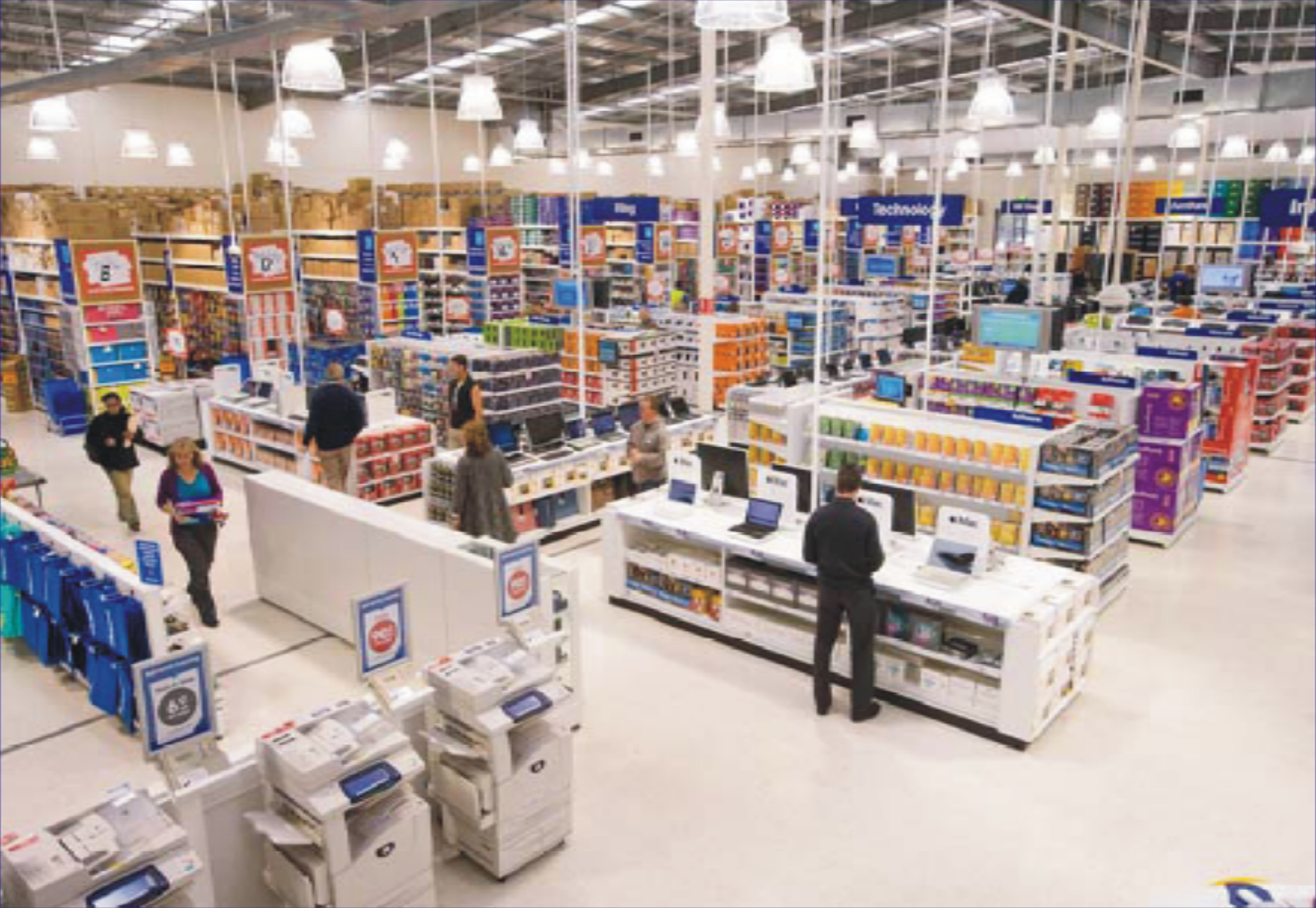
View of the interior of an Officeworks store in 2008.

== History ==
=== Formation to 2008 ===
The first Officeworks store opened in the inner-city suburb of Richmond in Melbourne on 16 June 1994.

IT retailer Harris Technology, purchased by Coles Myer in 1999, became a subsidiary of Officeworks. Viking Australia (a subsidiary of Office Depot) was purchased by Coles Myer in December 2002 and was merged with Officeworks Direct to form Officeworks BusinessDirect, which then became Officeworks Business.

In late 2006 Officeworks opened its 100th store in South Yarra, just kilometres from the first store in Richmond. Following the purchase of Coles Group by Wesfarmers in November 2007, Officeworks and Harris Technology became part of Wesfarmers' Home Improvement and Office Supplies division.

=== 2008–2021 ===
Officeworks rebranded in 2008, revising its logo, uniforms, store department names, and slogan – "Lowest Prices Everyday". This positioned Officeworks as a low cost warehouse similar to that of its sister company Bunnings. Officeworks also adopted the "Lowest Price Guarantee" similar to that found at Bunnings, where Officeworks offered to beat any competitor's price of an identical item by 5%. In 2011 Officeworks cut ties with paper supplier APRIL over claims that the paper supplier was illegally logging Indonesian forests.

Officeworks changed its slogan in August 2012 to "Big Ideas. Lowest prices". Under the new advertising campaign, commercials focussed on store prices being checked "twice daily", and slogans such as "we buy in bulk, so you get the lowest prices" were used. Officeworks also began offering free Wi-Fi access in all stores.

In June 2015, Officeworks opened a "3D Experience" centre at its Russell Street, Melbourne store, with 3D printers and scanners for sale, and 3D printing and scanning services.

By 2016 Officeworks had 164 stores nationally. In 2017, Officeworks stated it planned to add accounting, bookkeeping, payroll, communications and web design services targeted at small, micro and medium-sized businesses.

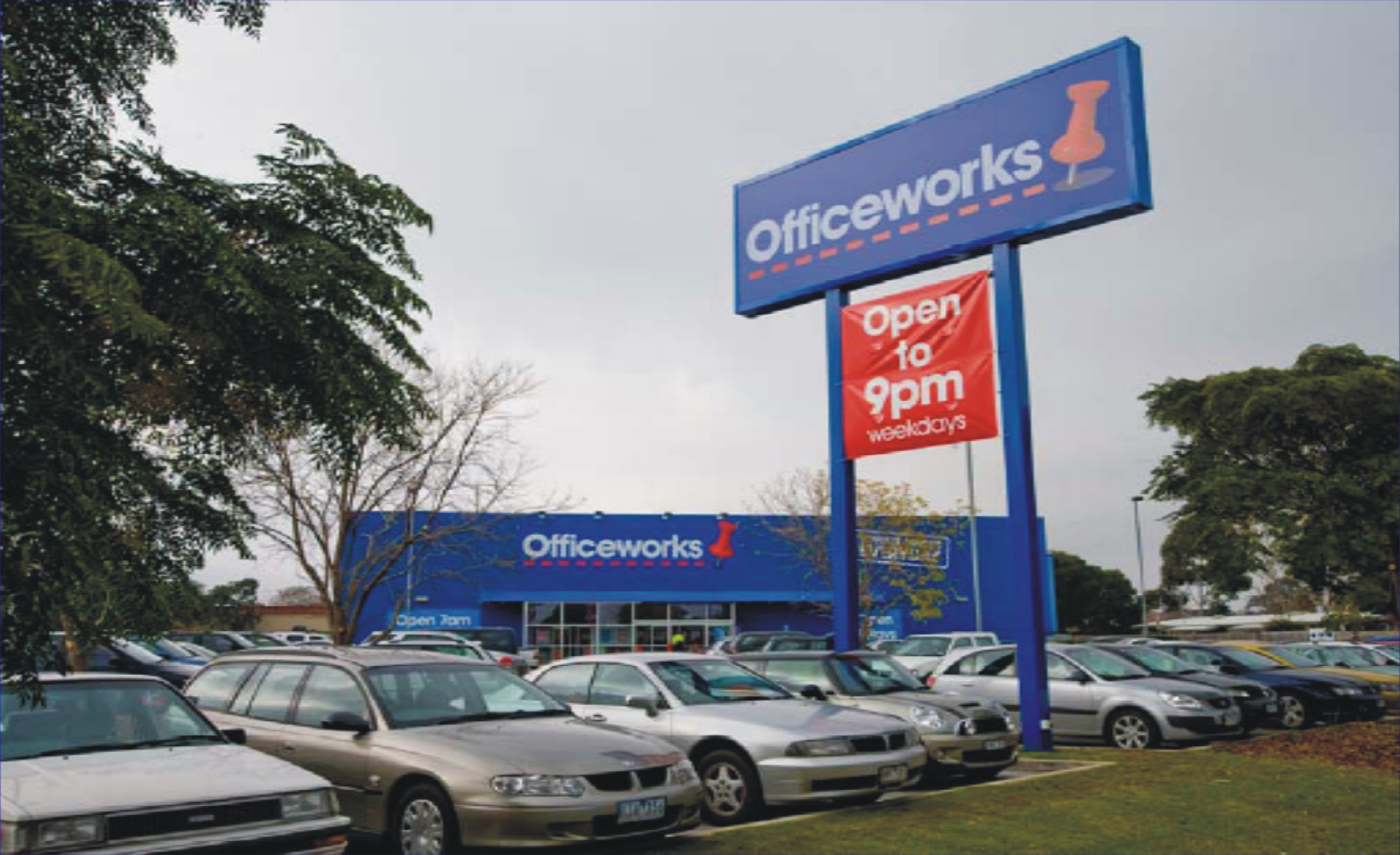
Officeworks store prior to 2022 rebrand.

In February 2018, Officeworks updated their tagline to "making bigger things happen" to reinforce that they're there to support customers by having a wide range of products at low prices and with great service.

In 2019, Officeworks acquired Geeks2U to expand to home technology assistance.

=== 2021–present ===
At the beginning of 2022 Financial Year, Officeworks began a national brand refresh. The transition saw the introduction of a new lettermark, darker blue branding with red dashed accenting and rebuilt app for smartphones. It also saw the introduction of "Flexiworks", a new business-customer oriented service.

The new app allow customers to find products and prices in store, have their receipts sent digitally as well as ordering through click and collect. It also added an "Aisle Finder" feature, allowing customers to navigate to the aisle where the product is located.

In February 2022, Officeworks acquired a 21% stake in World's Biggest Garage Sale, a Brisbane based organisation that repairs and re-purposes unwanted products. Officeworks plans to help the organisation expand into a national repair and recovery service under a new brand called Circonomy, focusing on the broader retail industry.

In December 2024, Officeworks acquired Box of Books, a provider of classroom resources such as ebooks, digital resources, textbooks and stationery.

== Charitable activities ==
Officeworks has been partnered with The Smith Family since 2007, through which Officeworks sponsors many young Australians every year to have the right supplies to go to school. Starting in late December and ending in late February each year, Officeworks raises money through customer donations in their back to school appeal.

In 2017, Officeworks launched their Restoring Australia initiative in partnership with Greening Australia. For every tree used to make their paper and wood based office supplies, based on weight, two trees will be planted in key Australia landscapes that are depleting. In June 2022, the one-millionth tree was planted, with a goal of reaching two million by 2025.

Officeworks was the first Australian company to be a signatory to the Vancouver Declaration, a public promise made by companies across the globe to work towards more sustainable sourcing of forest products.

In September each year, Officeworks runs a national ‘Wall of Hands’ campaign raising funds for the Australian Literacy and Numeracy Foundation. Customers can donate at the registers or online and purchase paper hands on which they can write the name and add to the in store display.

Each year, Officeworks hosts the 'Make a Difference Appeal' where customers can round-up their purchase to support a community organisation. In June 2022, the appeal supported 14 organisations around Australia.

== Business model ==
Officeworks is a category killer within the office supplies product category. Each of its stores carries more than 30,000 products, to which it adds a further 1,000 to 2,000 products annually. Officeworks aims to cater for the entire needs of the small office, home office and families with student dependants.

Most Officeworks stores feature the following departments:

- Print & Create (formerly Print, Copy & Create, Print & Copy, Printworks) – Printing, photocopying, laminating, custom promotional products, photobooks, business cards, printed stationery, stamps, ID photos and name badges.
- Technology (aka Business Machines, formerly Techworks) – Computers, laptops, Apple products, headphones, speakers, and other electronic products as well as ink cartridges and toners for printers.
- Furniture (formerly Furnitureworks) – Chairs, desks, workstations, filing cabinets, pedestals, lighting and other office furniture.
- Stationery – Pens, paper and other stationery needs.
- Art and craft supplies – Paints, watercolours, conte pencils, drawing pencils, sketch pads, easels, poster cardboard and canvases.
- Early learning and development products – shape and letter sets, craft kits, puzzles and board books.

House brands include Ampersand, Born, Insystem, J. Burrows, Kadink, Keji, Order, Otto, PPS, Qudo, Stilford and Studymate.

== See also ==
- Officedepot
