= Staples Business Advantage =

Division of Staples, Inc.

- Company type: Subsidiary
- Industry: Distribution
- Founded: 1993 - Staples Contract and Commercial; 1993 - Buhrmann N.V. 1986 - Corporate Express
- Headquarters: Massachusetts, U.S.
- Key people: Neil Ringel; President, North American Delivery
- Products: Office products
- Revenue: $23.1 billion (2013)
- Operating income: $1.2 billion (2013)
- Net income: $1.1 billion (2013)
- Parent: Staples Inc.
- Website: www.staplesadvantage.com

Staples Business Advantage is the contract division of Staples Inc., providing a membership program for office products, technology products, facilities supplies and breakroom supplies to businesses and institutions. Established in 1993 as Staples Contract and Commercial, the division was rebranded as Staples National Advantage and Staples Business Advantage in 1995. In 2008, Staples acquired Corporate Express (previously known as Buhrmann), expanding its contract offering to a global market. In 2009, this division was rebranded as Staples Advantage.

== History ==
=== Barker Office Supply ===
Staples Business Advantage can trace its history back to 1871. Samuel Barker, Jr., who had lied about his age so he could fight in the Civil War (Wisconsin 37th Regiment), afterward went to Cleveland in 1865 with 35 cents in his pocket. There he peddled papers, and in 1871 started a printing business. His business was quite successful and was still in the family a century later.

He opened his business with two small presses, a small steam engine, a hand cutter and some stationery stock. In 1890, his son, Raymond H. Barker, joined the firm. In 1911, S. Barker & Sons was incorporated, and in 1923, a grandson, Raymond M. Barker, joined the growing firm.

The company became one of the leading office-supply firms in northern Ohio, and by the 1950s was also offering metal and wood office furniture. By 1986, it was known as Barker Office Supply Company, with John S. Barker (a great-grandson of Samuel Barker, Jr.) as president. In 1989, the company was sold to Spectrum Office Supply of Rochester, New York, and in 1994, it was sold again, to Staples, which renamed the company Staples Business Advantage. John S. Barker retired from the company in 1989, but another of Samuel Barker, Jr's. great-grandsons, James Barker, remained with the company as a vice president.

=== Buhrmann ===
Buhrmann N.V. was initially formed from KNP BT, a paper, packaging and printing industry distribution company, founded in 1993 by the simultaneous merger of three companies: Koninklijke Nederlandsche Papierfabrieken (KNP), Bührmann-Tetterode and VRG-Groep. Across 1997 and 1998, the paper and packaging business areas were divested, leaving just the distribution interest, covering BT Office Products as well as graphic systems and paper merchandising businesses. KNP BT was renamed Buhrmann N.V. in July 1998.

=== Corporate Express Corporation ===
Corporate Express was founded by Jirka Rysavy, also the founder of Gaiam, in 1986 in Boulder, Colorado. Initially a regional office products retailer with 11 employees located in one small building, the company established a program of strategic procurement solutions as an industry innovation.

In 1991, Corporate Express became a public company with reported revenues of $621 million annually. Through acquisition of approximately 200 companies by the end of 1999, the company added to its product lines, customer services and geographic breadth. By January 1999, its last full year SEC filing, Corporate Express had revenues of $3.75B.

=== Buhrmann and Corporate Express Merger ===
In October 1999, Buhrmann acquired its competitor Corporate Express Corporation and combined it with BT Office Products. Corporate Express became the name of the office products arm of Buhrmann N.V..

In May 2001, Corporate Express acquired substantially all of the US Office Products (USOP) North American office products assets, including certain stand-alone furniture businesses. USOP's North American office products operations were integrated into Corporate Express, resulting in expected revenues of approximately $5 billion in North America. As a result, many board members of USOP gained spots on the board of Corporate Express. In 2003, Jirka Rysavy fully retired at age 48.

The company's new focus on a single business area was consolidated when its paper merchandising division was sold to Australia's PaperlinX in October 2003, leaving only the office-related products business. Reflecting the new single focus, it was decided to change the name of the company to Corporate Express N.V. in April 2004.

=== Staples acquisition of Corporate Express ===
United States-based office supplies retailer Staples Inc. launched an unsolicited acquisition bid for the company on 19 February 2008, offering €7.25 per share. The Corporate Express board rejected the offer, saying that the price undervalued the company. In a move widely seen as an attempt to stave off interest from Staples, the president announced a planned €1.4 billion takeover of French rival Lyreco on 21 May, only for Staples to make an increased offer of €9.15 per share on 3 June. After this too was rejected, a final offer of €9.25 per share (valuing Corporate Express at €1.68 billion) was accepted by the board on 11 June. The proposed Lyreco acquisition was subsequently abandoned. With over 95% of its stock acquired by Staples, Corporate Express was removed from the AEX index on 4 July 2008. Shares of the company were delisted on 5 August as Staples gained full control. This Buyout of 1.68 billion Euro, Equal to 2,204,910,223.03 USD, was one of the biggest of the decade. Corporate Express is now part of Staples Advantage.
