= Purity Supreme =

Defunct American retail company

Purity Supreme, Inc. was a corporation involved in the operation of supermarkets and other stores.

== Background ==
From 1984 it was a division of Supermarkets General Holdings Corporation. It operated from a headquarters located in North Billerica, Massachusetts. At its height, the company operated 64 supermarkets in Massachusetts, New Hampshire, Maine, and Connecticut. They also operated 63 owned and franchised Li'l Peach convenience stores and 23 drugstores in Massachusetts. They also ran the successful Heartland Foods, a warehouse-style supermarket chain. In 1984, at the time of the buyout by Supermarkets General, Purity, had an annual sales of $800 million (~$2.09 billion in 2025) with 28 supermarkets, 13 warehouse stores and 23 drugstores. Purity Supreme and Li'l Peach had combined sales of about US$1.3 billion in 1990 before the company was bought out again by Freeman Spogli & Co., an investment firm for about US$300 million (~$652 million in 2025), including the acquisition of debt.

In 1995, Purity Supreme was acquired by competitor Stop & Shop, agreeing with regulators to sell 15 stores to address antitrust concerns. Stop & Shop continued to operate 56 stores under the Purity Supreme name until 1997 when it renovated and converted all but three of them into Stop & Shop stores. The three remaining Purity Supreme stores were closed.

Purity Supreme was led for most of its existence by Leo Kahn who started Purity Sav-Mor Markets with some of its first stores in Billerica, Chelmsford and Bedford. In 1968, Kahn bought out the Supreme Market chain of Boston and thus Purity Supreme was born.
