= Thomas G. Stemberg =

American businessman

Tom Stemberg
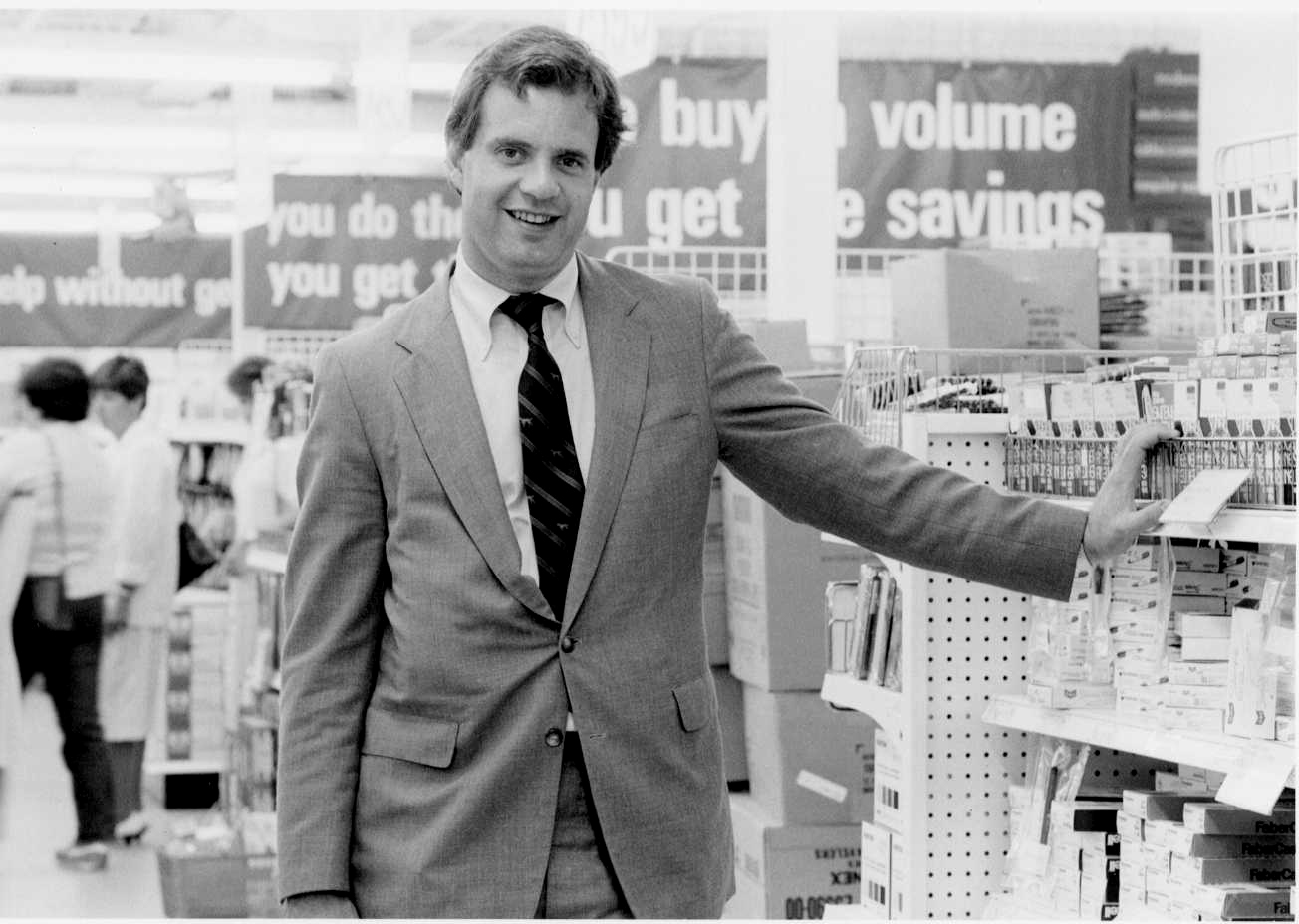
- Stemberg at one of the first Staples stores
- Born: Thomas George Stemberg; January 18, 1949; Orange, New Jersey, U.S.
- Died: October 23, 2015 (aged 66); Chestnut Hill, Massachusetts, U.S.
- Education: Harvard University (BA, MBA)
- Known for: Founder, Chairman, and Chief Executive Officer of Staples Inc.
- Political party: Republican
- Spouse(s): Maureen Sullivan (divorced); Dola Hamilton (divorced); Katherine Chapman O’Gara

Thomas George Stemberg (January 18, 1949 – October 23, 2015) was an American businessman, investor, and philanthropist. He was a pioneer of the office supplies superstore industry, most notably for founding office supply retail chain Staples Inc. with Leo Kahn.

== Early life and education ==
Stemberg was born on January 18, 1949, in Orange, New Jersey, the son of immigrants from Vienna, Austria, Erika (née Ratzer) and Oscar Michael Stemberg. His father was a lawyer who became a restaurateur. His father was Jewish and his mother was Catholic.

At Harvard College, he headed on managerial roles at Harvard Student Agencies, a hands-on organization of campus businesses, and the Harvard Independent, a newly established student newspaper. In 1973, Stemberg graduated from the Harvard Business School receiving his M.B.A. as a George F. Baker Scholar.

== Career ==
He started his career with the Jewel Company's Star Markets where he became the vice president for the company's sales and merchandising division.

In 1986, Stemberg started Staples with backing from private equity firms, including Hambro International Ventures, Harvard Management, Bessemer Ventures, Adler & Company, and Bain Capital; Bain co-founder Mitt Romney served on the company's board of directors for the next 15 years. By 1999, Staples had worldwide sales of over US$7 billion, with more than one thousand superstores, mail order catalogs, e-commerce outlets, and a contract business.

In 2005, Stemberg joined Highland Capital Partners, a venture capital firm, in Lexington, Massachusetts, as managing general partner.

Stemberg had an estimated net worth of $202 million, he was a philanthropist who donated funds in areas pertaining to education.

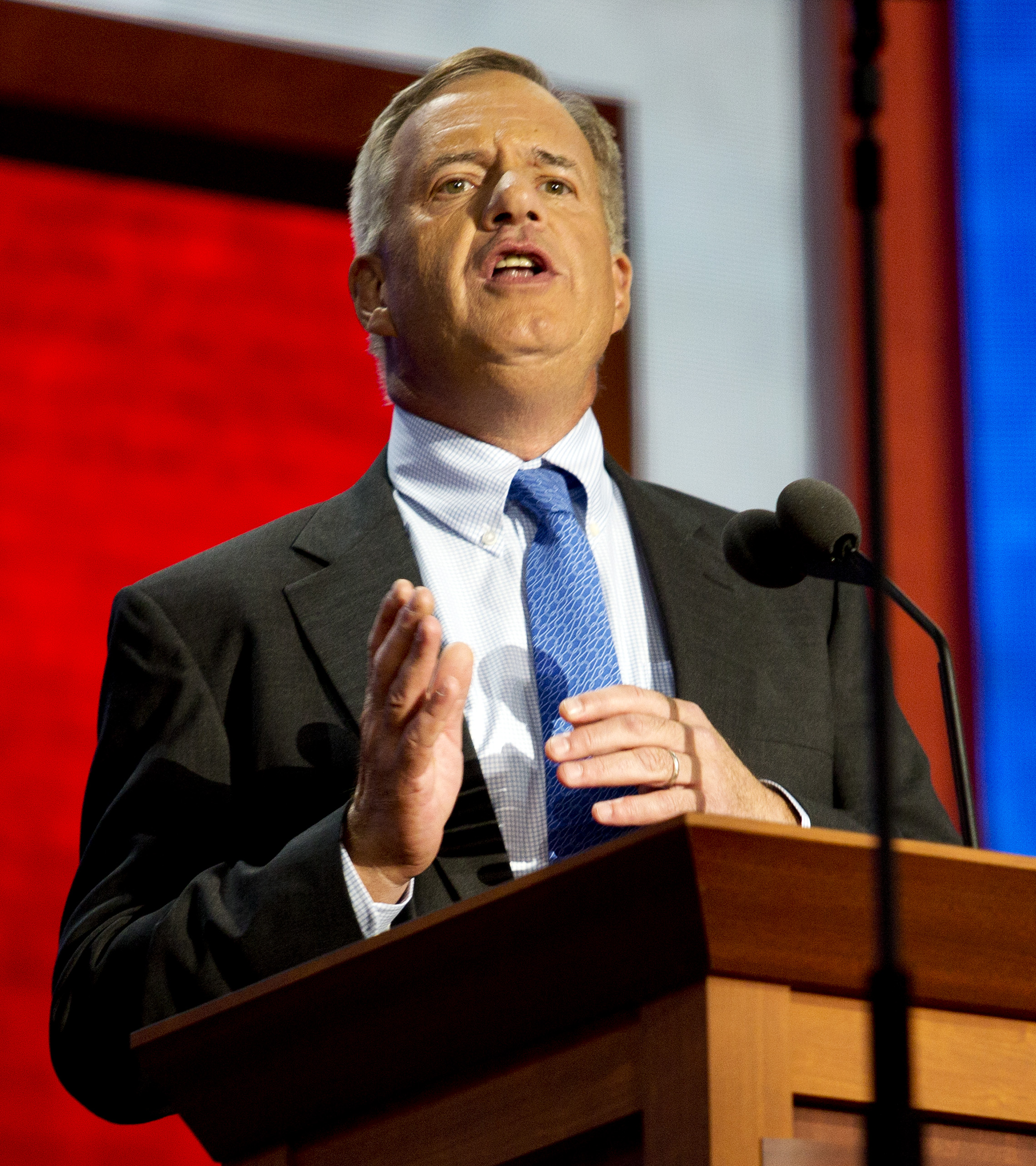
Stemberg speaking at the 2012 RNC

Stemberg, a political supporter of Mitt Romney since Romney ran for the U.S. Senate in 1994, spoke on Romney's behalf at the 2012 Republican National Convention. Stemberg encouraged Romney to make healthcare more accessible, which led Romney to reform healthcare in the commonwealth.

== Personal life ==
In 2012, Stemberg was involved in a legal dispute with his first wife, Maureen Sullivan.

Stemberg died on October 23, 2015, from gastric cancer. He was 66 years old.
