= Office World =

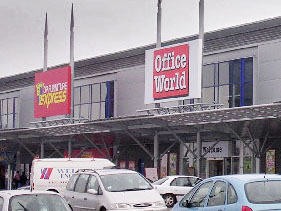
- Office World, Dundee, (2004)
- Type: Private company Subsidiary
- Industry: Retail
- Defunct: 2005
- Fate: Acquired
- Successor: Staples
- Products: Office supplies Computing; General stationery
- Parent: Staples UK (previously Globus Retail)

Office World plc was a chain of British office superstores that ceased trading in 2005 after administration and a company buy-out.

Office World had a number of competitors, including Staples, Stationery Box and Ryman. They sold both branded products (such as Esselte and Banner) and own-brand products (e.g. Office Essentials and Office World).

Office World also had a Print & Copy Centre in each store. It was possible for customers to bring in black/white or colour documents and have them photocopied at high volume. There was also a plan copier, mainly used for architectural drawings or maps. Finally there was also a self service option where for a cheaper price customers could use a slower more basic photocopier and self-serve.

In 2004, the company was acquired by Staples, who sold off the assets and stock. Office World subsequently became a dormant brand. The Office World brand, assets and stores were sold to Staples UK for the sum of £32.5 million. After the acquisition by Staples, very few Office World stores were converted into Staples due to their proximity to existing Staples stores. Many of the stores were left unoccupied and the final Office World store closed in November 2005.

== See also ==
- Migros
