= PNI Digital Media =

PNI Digital Media, Inc.
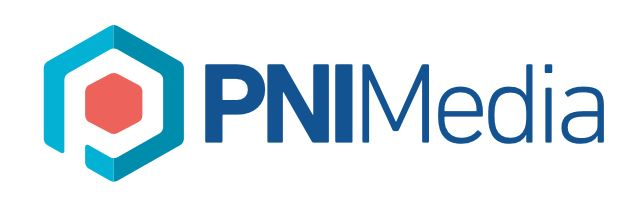
- Industry: Online, kiosk and mobile software that enables retailers to offer personalized products
- Founded: 1995; 31 years ago
- Headquarters: Vancouver, British Columbia, Canada
- Website: www.pnimedia.com

PNI Digital Media, Inc. is a company that operates an enterprise-class e-commerce platform which allows retailers to provide print-on-demand personalized products and services to their customers. Retailers who license the PNI platform use PNI's software to offer photo prints, photo gift merchandise, small business marketing products, document printing services and other print-on-demand merchandise.

Large companies such as Costco, Sam’s Club, and Staples use PNI Digital Media’s software platform to allow customers to create and order personalized products, including photo prints, photo books, canvas prints, photo calendars, greeting cards, invitations, business cards, signage, and documents.

== Retailers ==
The company launched in Vancouver, B.C., in 2001, taking on Walmart Canada as their first major photo site client in 2002. From 2003 to 2007, the company also provided its software platform for photo sites for Costco Canada, Blacks, Chapters, Loblaws and others.

PNI later expanded into the U.S. marketplace by licensing its software platform to CVS Health (then CVS/pharmacy), Costco, and Sam’s Club, although these contracts were lost several years later.

As of February 2017, PNI licensed its software platform to retailers such as Staples, Staples Canada, Tesco, FedEx Office, and Quill. As of June 6, 2022, PNI licensed its software platform only to Staples US and had faced severe downsizing, with most offices worldwide being closed.

== History ==
PNI Digital Media was formerly known as PhotoChannel Networks Inc., and the name was officially changed in June 2009.

On July 11, 2014, the company was acquired by Staples, Inc. for $74 million.

Commencing July 14, 2015, the online photo centres for Walmart Canada, CVS, Costco, and Rite Aid, all operated by PNI, were investigating credit card fraud. After being down for several weeks, the photo sites began to be re-launched in September 2015, rebuilt with enhanced security measures.

== Company ==
PNI has been included in Deloitte's Fast 50 and Fast 500 list, which recognizes Canada's fastest-growing tech firms, in 2009, 2010 and 2011. The company also has been included in the list of Canada's Top Employers in 2015, and BC's Top Employers in 2016.

== See also ==
- Image Hosting
- Kodak Gallery
- Shutterfly
- Snapfish
- PhotoBucket
