= Quill Corporation =

Office supply retailer based in Lincolnshire, Illinois

- Type: Subsidiary
- Industry: Retail
- Founded: 1956; 70 years ago
- Headquarters: Lincolnshire, Illinois, U.S.
- Key people: Mark Roszkowski
- Products: Office supplies
- Parent: Staples Inc. (1998–present)
- Website: www.quill.com

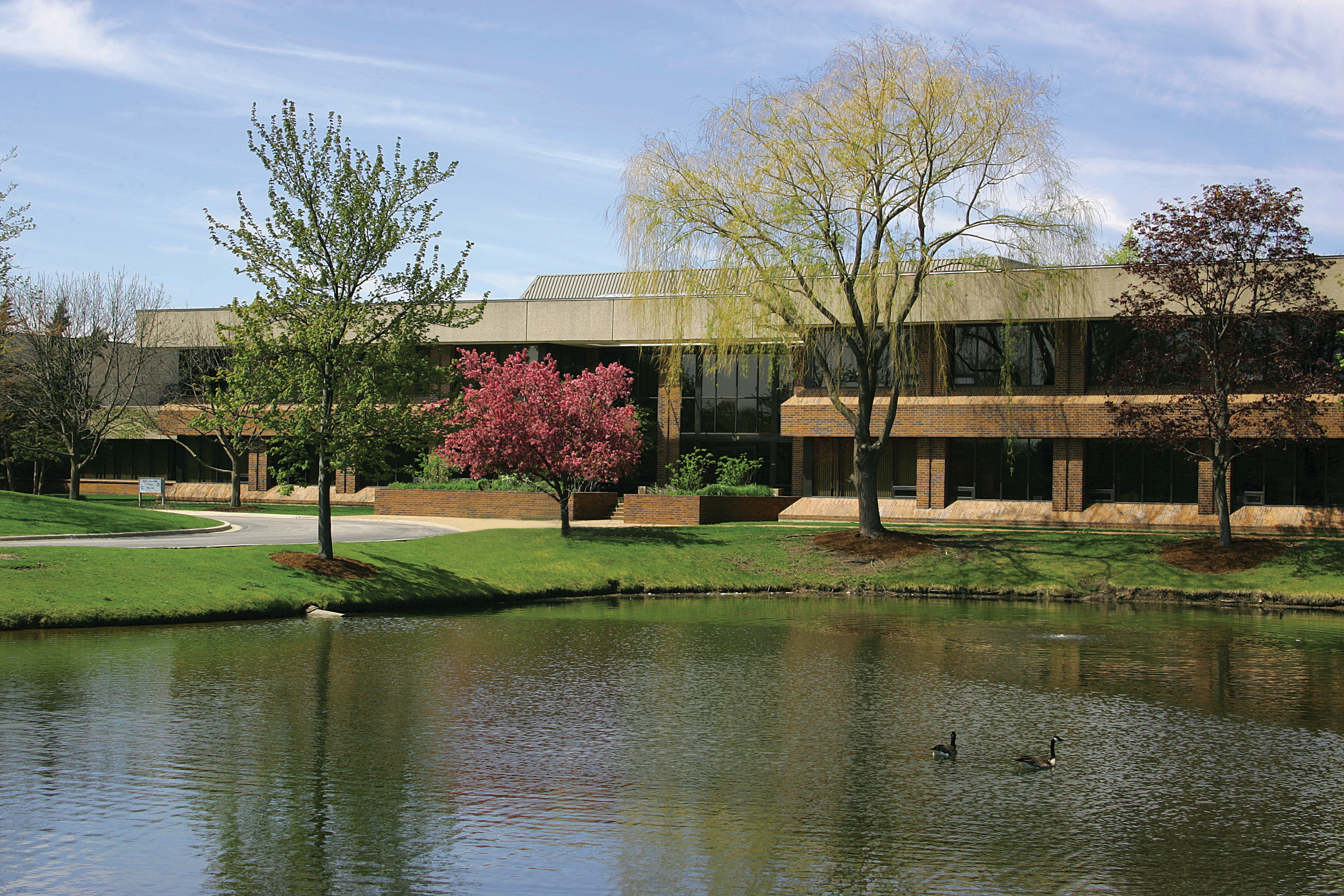
Quill headquarters

Quill Corporation is an American office supply retailer, founded in 1956, and headquartered in Lincolnshire, Illinois. A wholly owned subsidiary of Staples, Quill serves more than one million small and mid-sized U.S. business customers, with access to over one million assorted products.

While over 70% of sales are conducted online, it also employs mail-order and direct sales models. Although it engages in business-to-business direct markets of office supplies in the United States, it also sells products in other sectors such as technology, cleaning & breakroom supplies, furniture, safety products, and professional medical equipment through its Quill Healthcare unit. Between 1998 and 2009, Quill grew from $500 million in revenues to over $1 billion. It employs approximately 500 people and has twelve distribution centers. The president of the Staples subsidiary is Mark Roszkowski.

== History ==
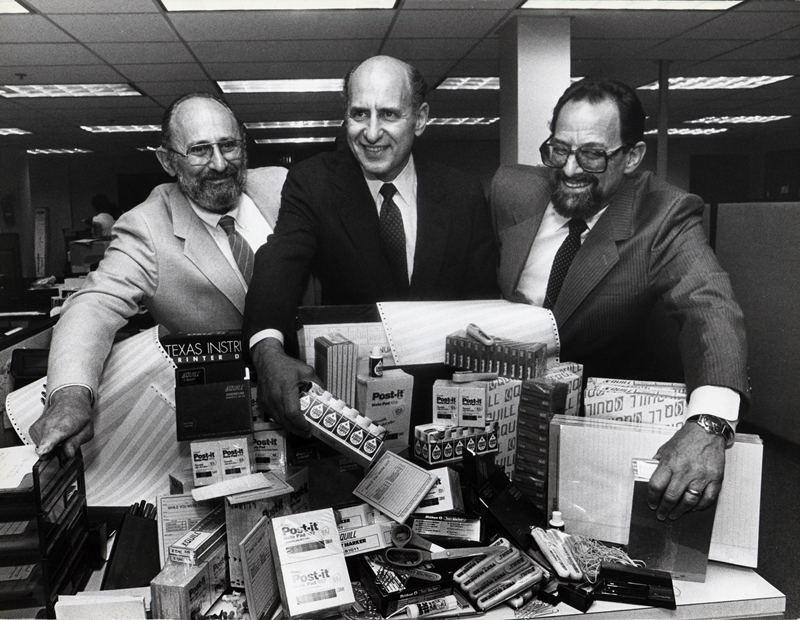
Jack Miller (middle), the founder, with his older brother Arnold (left) and younger brother Harvey (right) before the buyout.

Quill Corporation was the outgrowth of an idea by Jack Miller. In 1956, with a loan of $2,000 from Jack's father-in-law Quill's first office was established in the back room of Miller's father's poultry shop on the north side of Chicago. Initially lacking retail experience, the young entrepreneur relied heavily on his face-to-face selling techniques to drive revenue. With the assistance of Jack's brother Harvey, the two evolved their marketing strategies to include mail-order campaigns that enticed potential customers with substantially discounted prices and free shipping - transforming Quill Corporation into one of the first mail-order companies in the United States. In 1974, Quill reported annual sales of $3.5 million. In 1986, the company's revenues amounted to $180 million. Its mail-order business was the most successful within the office supplies market, with more than 40 million catalogues and flyers sent to a customer base of approximately 600,000 businesses and organizations, and listing more than 9,000 various office supplies and products. In 1996, the company launched the website Quill.com. In 1998, Quill Corporation was acquired by Staples, Inc. for approximately $685 million. Jack Miller utilized funds from the sale of Quill to create the Jack Miller Center., a non-profit that promotes the teaching of America's founding principles and history.

== Online ==
The domain quill.com attracted at least one million visitors annually by 2008, according to a Compete.com survey. Quill Corporation launched a Quill coupons page in 2014 to help customers find even better deals on the site. A blog has also been created, Cafe Quill aimed to start conversations with small to medium-sized businesses about workplace leadership, business trends, productivity, and a special section called kindness corner to highlight stories about businesses doing great things in the community. Quill Ideas was developed in 2014 to give their customers a way to share thoughts and ideas that can make their workday easier and help enhance their experience with Quill. In 2016, Quill has launched its rewards program, QuillPlus, with two membership tiers, blue and gold.

== Community ==
Quill has participated in the "WGN-TV Back-to-School Kids Fair" since 2010. This event provides needed supplies to Chicago school children. In addition to supplies, there are services like haircuts & eye exams for the kids as well as food, fun and games. Quill participates and passes out 1500 backpacks and supplies.

In April 2014, the Orlando Magic and Quill partnered together to give back to the community in Orlando, Florida. Quill awarded the Magic Educator of the Year, Zach Darnell, $10,000 in Quill cash in order to help Zach purchase school supplies for his classroom and students. Along with this Quill awarded six other teachers, who were deemed teachers of the month, $500 in Quill cash throughout the year. In February 2015, Quill again partnered with the Orlando Magic, this time to work together and give back directly to the youth of Central Florida. Together the Magic and Quill refurbished the computer lab at the James R. Smith Community Center. Quill provided the community center with new desks and all their technological needs such as monitors, keyboards, and computers.

== Dunder Mifflin campaign ==
Dunder Mifflin company logo

In 2011, Quill launched a Dunder Mifflin brand of copy paper from the popular NBC sitcom, The Office. It was ranked in the top five products sold in 2012. Because of the popularity, Quill added the Dunder Mifflin brand on a variety of products from sticky notes, to notepads, to storage boxes. A majority of the products have a special, Dunder Mifflin feature to them that makes them unique. For example, the notepads allow you to mark if your coworkers are alert, asleep, or doing crosswords. The promotion is largely considered a success, as the Dunder Mifflin product line experienced double digit growth year after year. NBC keeps 6% of the revenue from Dunder Mifflin sales.

== Acquisitions ==
On April 7, 1998 Staples, Inc. issued a press release indicating plans to acquire Quill Corporation for a purchase price of $685 million in a combination of about 30 million fixed and variable priced shares. The acquisition will aid Staples increase its presence in the office products market due in part to Quill’s success in the sales of office supplies to businesses, an area which previously accounted for only 20 percent (about $1 billion) of Staples’ total revenue in 1997. After the transaction Quill will retain its headquarters in Lincolnshire, Ill. along with its name and management. In July 2002, Medical Arts Press became a subsidiary of Quill when Staples, Inc. purchased the Minneapolis-based company for $385 million. Since 1950, Medical Arts Press has helped healthcare practices meet their unique front-office supply needs. Medical Arts Press carries the industry's largest selection of specialty filing and general office supplies, 100% government-compliant forms, code books, office furnishings, imprinted patient communication and giveaways, ink and toner, breakroom supplies and more.

In addition to the acquisition of Medical Arts Press, Quill also obtained SmileMakers and Hayes Marketing Inc. (HMI). Both provide creative products to help build patient loyalty and promote practices with giveaway items, promotional postcards, greeting cards and more.

== Tagline ==
In 2014, Quill's "A small part of your job is 100% of ours." branding campaign was launched. In conjunction with the expansion of Quill's product assortment, the goal of the campaign is to show that Quill is a supplier of all products a business needs and highlight that they even offer specialty products for retail, foodservice, education, industrial and hospitality businesses.

== Timeline ==
- 1956 — Quill is founded by Jack Miller in Chicago, IL
- 1957 — Quill moves into its first real office and warehouse
- 1963 — Quill's first big mail-order catalog is introduced
- 1974 — Quill reports annual sales of $3.5 million
- 1986 — Quill reports annual revenues of $180 million
- 1992 — United States Supreme Court case Quill Corp. v. North Dakota in which Quill took the position that North Dakota does not have the power to make Quill collect a use tax from North Dakota customers (this was overruled in 2018 with South Dakota v. Wayfair, Inc.)
- 1995 — A wide range of school supplies are added, such as crayons, rulers, audiovisual equipment, erasers, and other items to meet the needs of primary and secondary students
- 1996 — Quill.com is launched
- 1998 — Quill is acquired by Staples, Inc.
- 2000 — Larry Morse is named president
- July 2002 – Medical Arts Press becomes a subsidiary of Quill
- 2004 — Quill is awarded the "Circle of Excellence" Platinum Award by BizRate.com (a Shopzilla Company) for customer service
- 2006 — "So fast, so simple" branding campaign launched
- April 2006 — "Clips" the Quill chicken and official mascot of Quill's 50th anniversary is "hatched"
- June 23, 2006 — Quill celebrates its 50th anniversary
- 2007 — Quill is recognized by J.D. Power and Associates for providing "An Outstanding Customer Service Experience", expands to twelve distribution centers with the addition of one in Denver, Colorado, and attains 70% of total sales online at Quill.com
- 2008 — Quill launches the Green Scene initiative with environmentally friendly products and business practices
- 2008 — Quill is recognized by J.D. Power and Associates
- 2009 — Quill launches layoffs of ARDC employees
- 2009 — Quill rebrands to Quill.com and updates tag line to "Best experience in office products"
- 2009 — Quill.com launches a Facebook page and Twitter feed 'Quillcom'
- 2014 — Quill launched the "A small part of your job is 100% of our job." branding campaign
- 2023 — Quill launched "the rewarding workplace" branding campaign and also launched a redesigned website with a new rewards program.
