= Winc =

Office supplies company

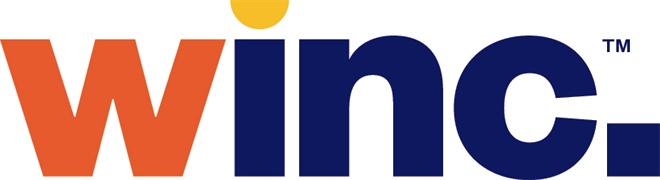
- Type: Private
- Industry: Office supply retailing
- Founded: 1986; 40 years ago
- Headquarters: Australia
- Area served: Australia
- Key people: Peter Kelly, CEO
- Website: winc.com.au

Winc is a workplace support company operating in Australia supplying office essentials, furniture, safety equipment and IT solutions. The company is focused on supporting businesses through the delivery of everything a workplace needs to work - supporting learners, carers and workers across the corporate, government, education and healthcare sectors. The company was previously known as Staples and Corporate Express. Winc Australia operates across all states and territories and also includes Business Interiors, which is a premium office design division for corporate fit-outs.

== History ==
The Winc brand was launched in September 2017. It stands for Work Incorporated. The new brand was created in conjunction with Platinum Equity after it completed the acquisition of the Staples business in Australia in April 2017. In February 2018, Platinum Equity also completed the acquisition of the OfficeMax business in Australia.

In August 2026, Winc announced a distribution agreement with the Australian owned Boyer Paper Mill in Tasmania, Under the deal, the mill is now producing Australian-made copy paper which is available exclusively through Winc, making Boyer the sole white office copy paper manufacturer in Australia following the closure of Opal's Maryvale mill in 2023.
