= Leo Kahn (entrepreneur) =

American businessman

- Born: December 31, 1916; Medford, Massachusetts, U.S.
- Died: May 11, 2011 (aged 94); Boston, Massachusetts, U.S.
- Education: Harvard University (BA); Columbia University (MS)
- Occupations: American businessman and reporter
- Known for: Co-founder of Staples Inc.
- Spouse(s): Dorothy Davidson Kahn (1963-1975), Emily Perkins Gantt Kahn (1976-2011)
- Children: 3 (including Joseph Kahn)

Leo Kahn (December 31, 1916 – May 11, 2011) was an American reporter and businessman. He is credited as the co-founder of Staples Inc. Kahn is also considered a pioneer of the natural and health food supermarket industry, founding the Fresh Fields and Nature's Heartland chains, which are now part of Whole Foods Market.

== Biography ==
=== Early life ===
Kahn was born in Medford, Massachusetts, as the younger of two brothers. His parents, who were Lithuanian Jewish immigrants, owned a wholesale food distributor. Kahn graduated from Malden High School in Malden, Massachusetts.

Kahn received a bachelor's degree from Harvard University in 1938. He then obtained a master's degree in journalism from Columbia University in New York City in 1939. He worked a reporter in New Bedford, Massachusetts, and practiced public relations for political campaigns until he was drafted into the U.S. military in 1941 as the U.S. entered World War II. He was stationed in North Africa, Europe and Asia as a navigator for the Army Air Forces.

He and his brother, Albert Kahn, took over the family's wholesale business following the end of World War II. He became the sole owner of the business when his brother left the company to become a professor at Boston University.

Kahn married his first wife, Dorothy Davidson, in 1963 and had three children. The family resided in Chelmsford, Massachusetts, until Dorothy Kahn's death in 1975.

=== Purity Supreme ===
Kahn continued to operate his family's wholesale food distributor. However, he also launched a new grocery retailing division, which became known as Purity Supreme. The company initially opened small groceries, but then expanded to supermarkets. The Purity Supreme company also included Heartland Foods, which was called "the first successful deep-discount warehouse supermarket in the country" by Inc Magazine.

One of Kahn's biggest rivals was Thomas G. Stemberg, the owner of a competing New England supermarket chain called First National Supermarkets. At one point, Kahn and Stemberg engaged in a price war over the lower price for Thanksgiving turkeys.

Kahn sold Purity Supreme to the Supermarkets General Corporation in 1984 for $80 million. Through the transaction, Kahn became the chairman of Supermarket General. Privately, Kahn regretted selling Purity, saying he missed the interaction with his employees.

== Personal life ==
Kahn married Dorothy Davidson. After 11 years of marriage, Dorothy died in 1975. He later married Emily Gantt, who survived him. From his first marriage, Kahn had a daughter, Elizabeth, and two sons, Daniel and Joseph. Joseph Kahn is a journalist and the executive editor of The New York Times. His stepdaughters were Lisa and Xandria Birk. Kahn had eight grandchildren and three step grandchildren. Leo Kahn was on the board of the Committee for Accuracy in Middle East Reporting in America.

== Death ==
Kahn died at the Springhouse care facility in the Jamaica Plain neighborhood of Boston from a series of strokes on May 11, 2011, at the age of 94.
