= William R. McLucas =

American attorney

William R. McLucas or (Bill McLucas) is an American attorney who served as the Director of Enforcement at the U.S. Securities and Exchange Commission (SEC) from 1989 to 1998. After leaving the SEC, he became a partner at the law firm Wilmer Cutler Pickering Hale and Dorr.

== Early life and education ==
McLucas was born and raised in a working-class environment in Lilly, Pennsylvania where his father was a foreman at a local company. He graduated cum laude from Pennsylvania State University in 1972 with a Bachelor of Arts degree in Political Science and was inducted into Phi Beta Kappa. He earned his Juris Doctor from Temple University Beasley School of Law in 1975, where he served as the Research Editor for the Temple Law Quarterly and is currently a member of the Law School’s Board of Visitors. Before joining the SEC, he worked at the Federal Home Loan Bank Board for two years. In 1999, he married Paula Kashtan, a lawyer and former SEC colleague, and the couple has two sons and a daughter.

== Career ==
In 1977, McLucas began his career at the SEC's Division of Enforcement. Over the years, he advanced through various roles, becoming Branch Chief in 1980, Assistant Director in 1984, and Associate Director in 1986. In 1989, he was appointed Director of the Division of Enforcement by then-SEC Chairman Richard C. Breeden and served under the administrations of George H. W. Bush and Bill Clinton until April 1998, making him the longest-serving director in the Commission's history, holding the position for over eight years.

He received the President’s Award for Distinguished Executive Service from President Ronald Reagan in 1988.

McLucas's appointment followed an extensive selection process in which SEC officials interviewed approximately 30 candidates. Among the final contenders were John H. Sturc, who played a significant role in the insider trading case against financier Ivan F. Boesky, along with internal candidates Joseph I. Goldstein and Thomas C. Newkirk. Ultimately, McLucas was chosen for the position based on his experience and tenure within the agency. His experience also included a temporary assignment as Acting Associate Regional Administrator of the SEC’s New York office, balancing both regional and headquarters responsibilities.

During his tenure as Director of Enforcement, McLucas oversaw numerous high-profile investigations and enforcement actions. He played a pivotal role in the SEC's insider trading cases against Boyd L. Jefferies, financier Marc Belzberg, and First City Financial Corporation. He was also involved in cases targeting fraudulent activities at financial institutions following the savings and loan crisis.

McLucas was involved in several high-profile Wall Street cases, including those against Michael R. Milken and Ivan Boesky. His tenure included investigations into major financial scandals such as the Orange County, California, bankruptcy, the Prudential Securities partnership frauds, and the price-fixing inquiry involving NASDAQ market makers.

During his tenure, the SEC created an enforcement unit to focus on investor fraud at banks and savings institutions. The unit, launched under Chairman Breeden's directive, was initially staffed with 25 members and aimed to enhance investor confidence.

After leaving the SEC in 1998, McLucas joined WilmerHale as a partner and served as chair of the firm's Securities Department for over 15 years. His practice expanded into corporate governance and he led internal investigations into corporate misconduct, including serving as lead attorney in the Enron investigation, after being hired by a committee of outside directors to investigate and report on Enron's financial misconduct.

Former SEC Commissioner Joseph Grundfest described him as "smart, tough, and honest". He also represented the Special Committee of the Board of WorldCom during its accounting scandal.

McLucas also provided legal counsel to major financial institutions, including JP Morgan Chase.

In 2000, McLucas was engaged by Tyco International to provide legal guidance amid an SEC investigation. In an internal email, he warned company executives about the potential severity of regulatory actions and urged them to ensure full compliance. The SEC probe concluded without formal charges against Tyco.

In 2012, McLucas was engaged by Best Buy's board of directors to lead an internal investigation into the personal conduct of former CEO Brian Dunn.

McLucas has received numerous recognitions, including being named in 2018 to the Lawdragon Magazine Hall of Fame, the National Public Service Award in 1996, and the William O. Douglas Award from the Securities and Exchange Commission Alumni Association in 2010. He was named a Distinguished Alumni by Penn State in 1996.

== Awards ==
- 2010, William O. Douglas Award
- 1996, National Public Service Award
- 1988, President's Award for Distinguished Executive Service from President Ronald Reagan
