= OfficeMax =

American office supplies retailer

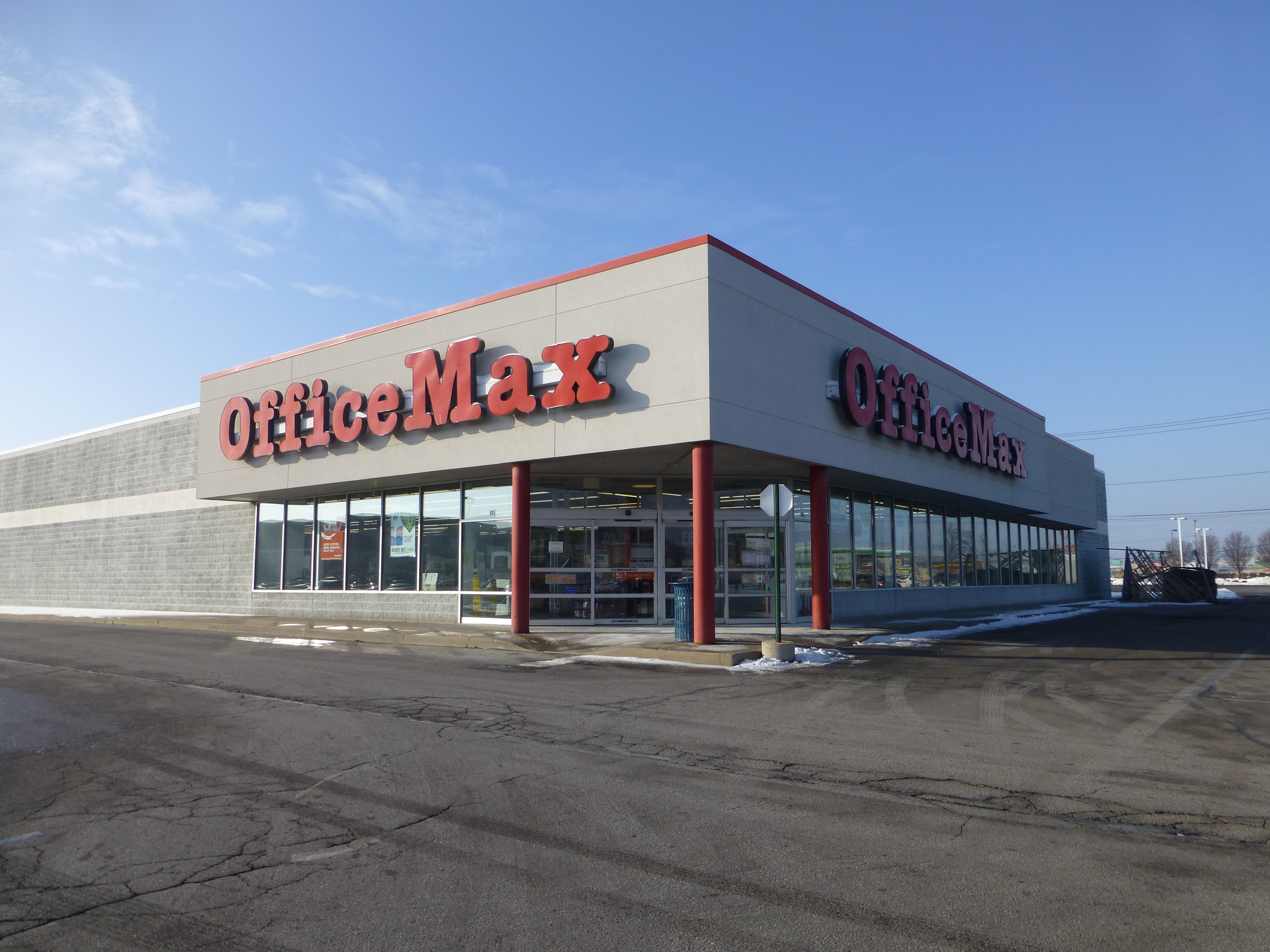
- An OfficeMax store in Toledo, Ohio (2013)
- Type: Subsidiary
- Industry: Retail
- Founded: April 1, 1988; 38 years ago Cleveland, Ohio, U.S.
- Founder: Bob Hurwitz; Michael Feuer
- Number of locations: 941 (2021)
- Area served: United States; Mexico (since 1996); New Zealand; Australia (until 2020)
- Products: Office supplies
- Parent: Kmart (1991–1995); Boise Cascade (2003–2004); Office Depot (2013–present)
- Website: www.officedepot.com

OfficeMax is an American office supplies retailer founded in 1988. As an independent chain, it was the third-largest office supply retailer in the United States. Following a 2013 merger, it is currently a brand and subsidiary of Office Depot.

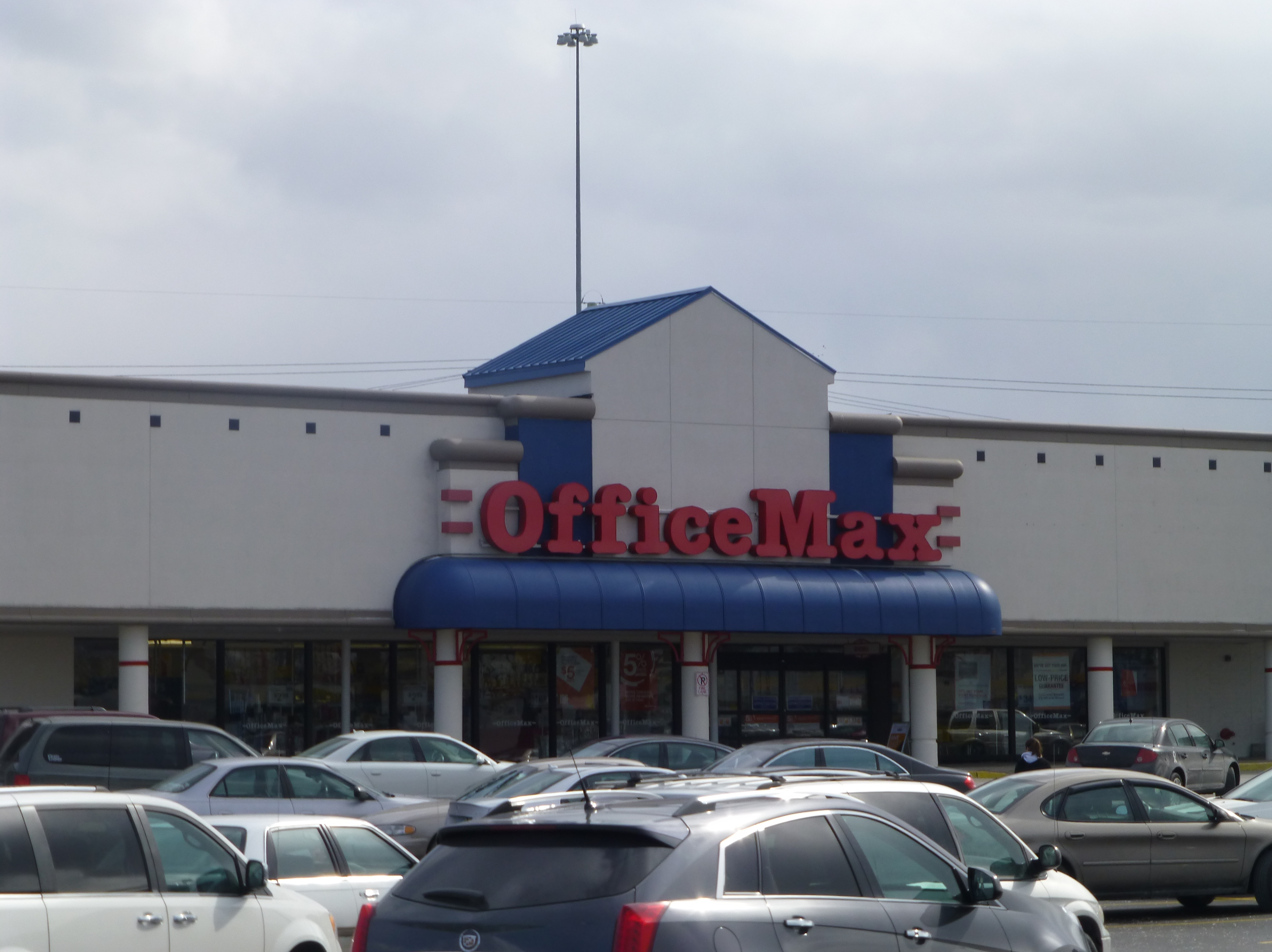
The first OfficeMax store, located in Mayfield Heights, Ohio (2013)

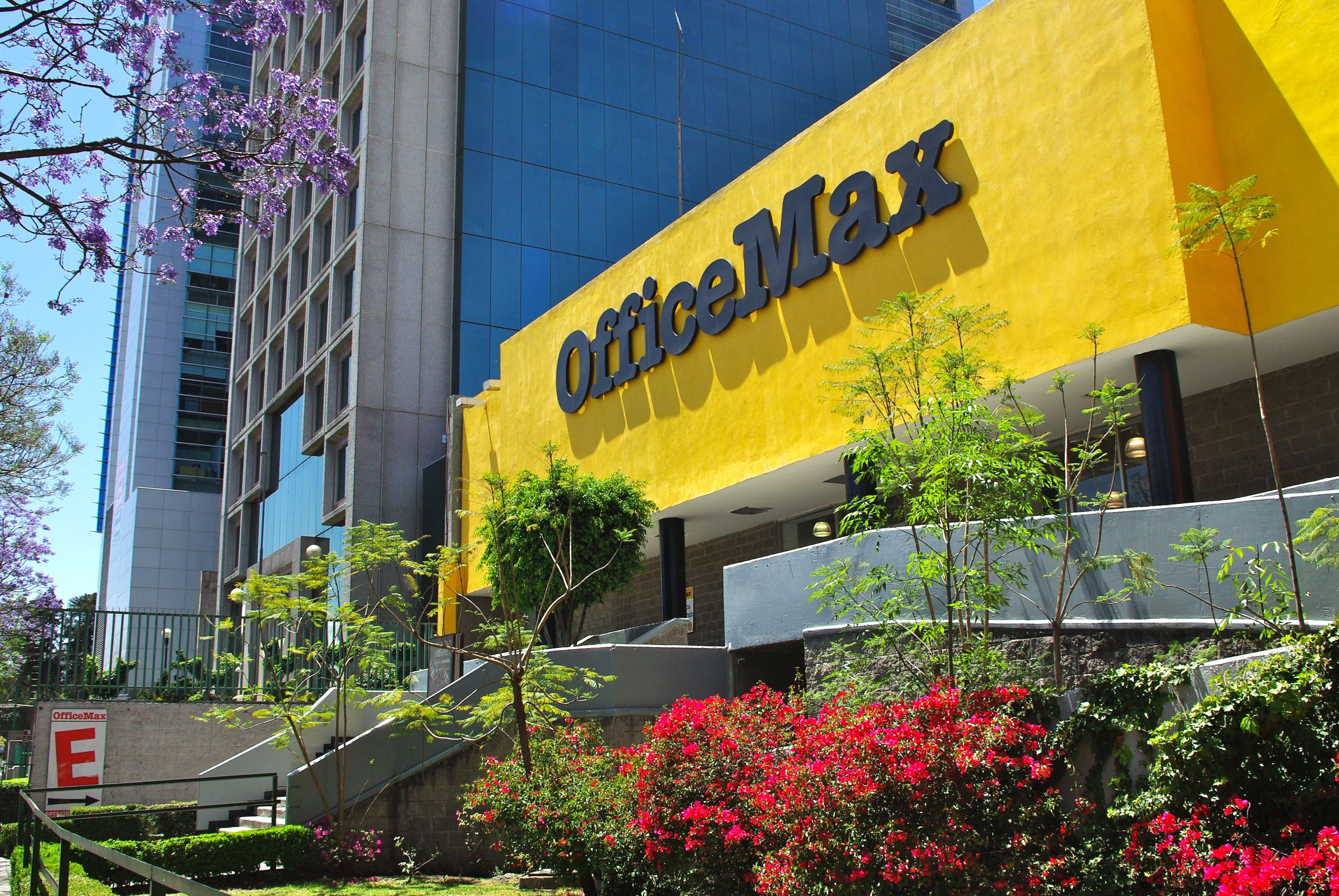
OfficeMax in Mexico City (2010)

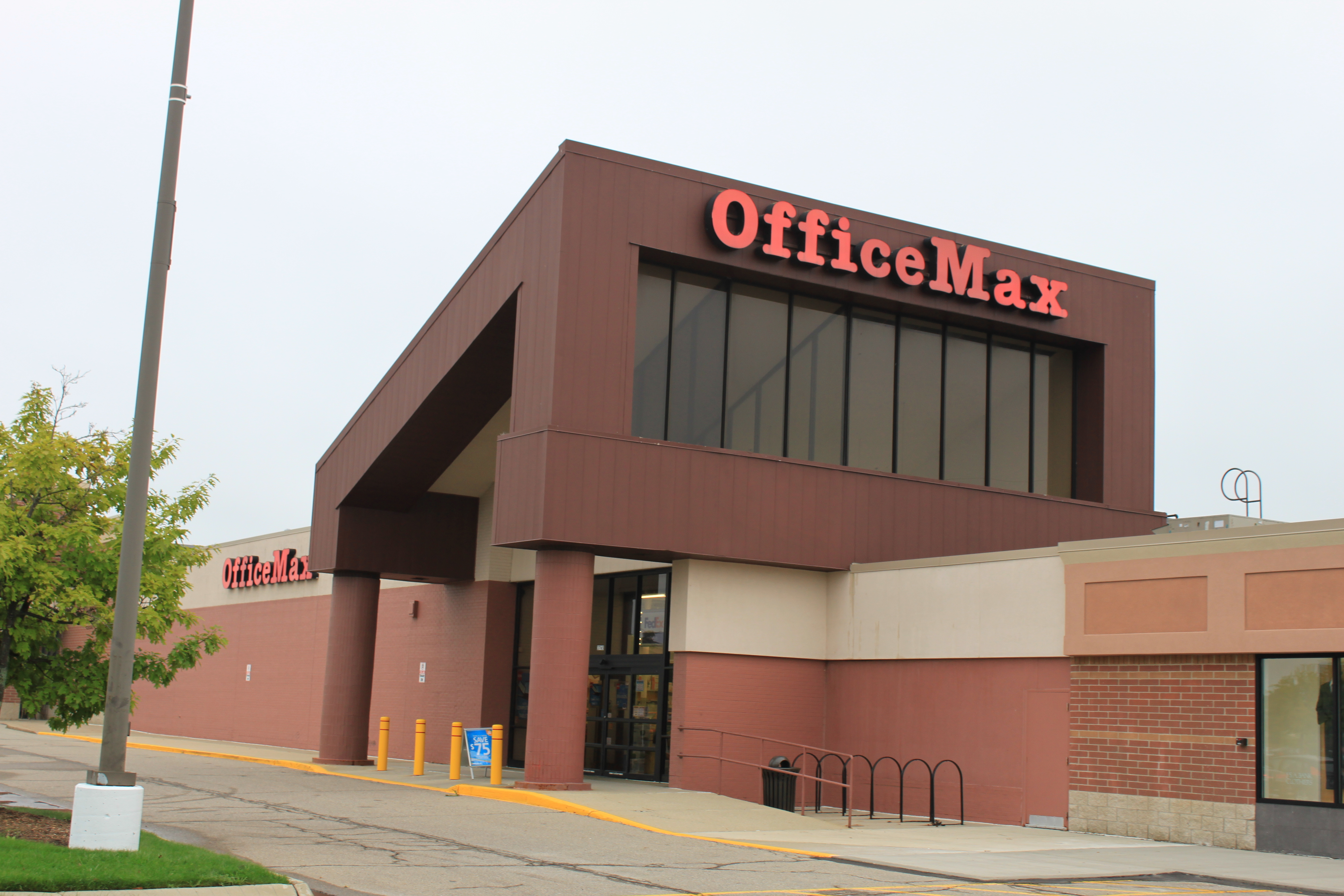
An OfficeMax in Ann Arbor, Michigan (2013)

== History ==
OfficeMax was founded in Cleveland on April 1, 1988, by Bob Hurwitz and Michael Feuer. Hurwitz served as executive chairman and chief executive officer, and Feuer was the president and chief operating officer. On July 5, 1988, OfficeMax opened its first retail store in the Golden Gate Shopping Center in Mayfield Heights, Ohio. Hurwitz left the company in 1993 and Feuer became the chairman and chief executive officer.

OfficeMax grew by acquisition with Office World first in November 1990, with Office World executive and Montgomery Ward becoming minority shareholders. In 1990, Office Square stores were purchased from Kmart, in exchange for a 22% equity stake. In 1991, Kmart increased its stake in OfficeMax to 92%. In January 1992, OfficeMax acquired five sites from Highland Superstores in Boston. OW Office Warehouse, a Virginia-based regional chain, was acquired on June 30, 1992. The company then acquired BizMart, its largest acquisition (104 stores) to date, in 1993 from Intelligent Electronics. On August 16, 1993, OfficeMax joined Kmart and most of the other Kmart-owned banners in the "largest power center" Kmart operated in Utica, Michigan. OfficeMax acquired a 19% stake in Corporate Express, a contract stationer. In May 1994, Kmart put a plan in front of its stockholders to sell 20% to 30% of each of its specialty store subsidiaries shares on the open market to pay down debt and fund future expansion of the subsidiaries. Kmart's shareholders turn down the proposal at their June 3 annual meeting. In November 1994, FurnitureMax store within a store concept begins testing in the Cleveland market. In 1995, Kmart sold off 51% of OfficeMax shares, spinning off the company and became a NYSE-(OMX) publicly traded corporation, based in Shaker Heights, Ohio.

=== Public corporation ===
In 1995, OfficeMax became one of a handful of companies doing business through internetMCI. Around this time Kmart sold the remaining 25% of the OfficeMax shares it held. On July 14, 1996, a new kiosk program called BatteryMax was test launched in two Phoenix stores. BatteryMax were operated by Batteries for Everything.

OfficeMax also filed lawsuits for infringement for use of the "Max" name against Med Max and Circuit City for CarMax, its used car business. For the next few years OfficeMax and its rivals, Staples and Office Depot, continued to open new stores, saturating the market segment.

OfficeMax developed regional delivery centers, and invested in its super-regional PowerMax distribution centers in Las Vegas, Nevada, Hazleton, Pennsylvania, and Birmingham, Alabama after litigation began with previous logistics and shipping provider.

A small sized store concept, OfficeMax PDQ, test was launched in Woodmere, Ohio, in late June 1998. By 2001, the chain operated 960 stores. That year, OfficeMax began closing underperforming stores in some neighborhoods and in regions where it did not have a strong presence. In 2003, OfficeMax was acquired by Boise Cascade Corporation for $1.3 billion. The following year, the combined company split into two: its wood and paper operations were acquired by Madison Dearborn Partners, and the remaining company adopted the OfficeMax name.

In December 2012, OfficeMax operated 941 stores in 47 states, Puerto Rico, the U.S. Virgin Islands and Mexico; that year, net sales were $6.9 billion, down from $8.3 billion in 2008.

=== Merger with Office Depot ===
It was announced on February 20, 2013, that OfficeMax and Office Depot would combine in an all-stock deal, creating the largest U.S. office-supplies chain. However, as of May 2, 2013, a lawsuit filed by a stockholder, Hollander v. OfficeMax Inc et al., U.S. District Court, Northern District of Illinois, No. 13-3330 was filed to block the merger, which would pay all OfficeMax shareholders 2.69 shares of Office Depot in exchange for a single share in OfficeMax. Eric Hollander said in a statement "OfficeMax, if properly exposed to the market for corporate control, would bring a price materially in excess of the amount offered in the proposed transaction..." Office Depot said on May 5, 2013, that it would hold a special meeting with shareholders after the staff of the U.S. Securities and Exchange Commission finished reviewing documents relating to its merger with OfficeMax.

The merger with Office Depot closed on November 5, 2013. On December 10, Office Depot, Inc. announced that it had chosen Boca Raton, Florida for its global headquarters post-merger, closing the OfficeMax headquarters in Naperville, Illinois.

Following the merger, the two chains integrated, though many retain the OfficeMax name. Some have since closed, while others rebranded as Office Depot following renovations. The original OfficeMax store in Mayfield Heights closed permanently on May 16, 2015.

=== New Zealand branch closures ===
In 2018, the New Zealand branch of OfficeMax was purchased by Platinum Equity and split into a separate organisation. Later, on 26 August 2020, OfficeMax NZ announced that it would close all 14 of its physical locations and shift operations online in response to growing online usage and the COVID-19 pandemic in New Zealand.

== See also ==
- Grand & Toy — OfficeMax's Canadian subsidiary (founded 1882 and acquired in 1996)
