= Sports Authority =

Defunct American sporting goods retailer

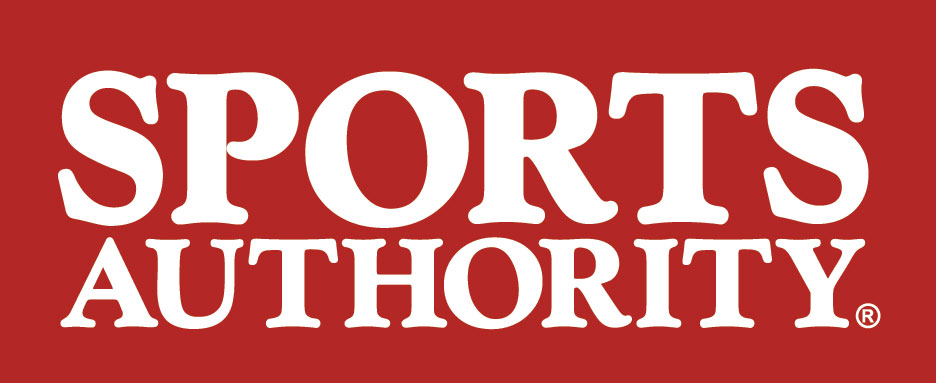

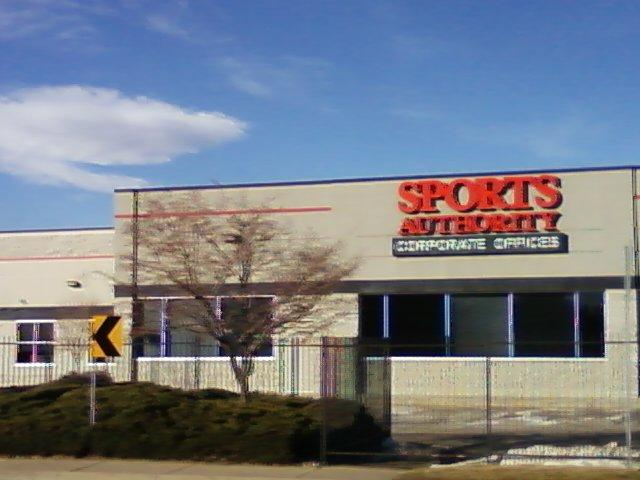
- Sports Authority's former headquarters in Englewood, Colorado
- Type: Private
- Industry: Retail
- Founded: 1928; 98 years ago (as Gart Sports) in Denver, Colorado; November 1987; 38 years ago (as The Sports Authority) in Fort Lauderdale, Florida
- Founder: Gart Sports; Nathan Gart; Sports Authority Various: Businessmen Jack A. Smith Roy M. Cohen Richard Lynch Private equity/Investment firms William Blair Venture Partners First Chicago Venture Partners Bain Capital Phillips-Smith Venture Partners Marquette Venture Partners Bessemer Securities
- Defunct: July 29, 2016; 10 years ago
- Fate: Chapter 7 bankruptcy
- Headquarters: 1050 West Hampden Avenue, Englewood, Colorado, United States
- Number of locations: 463 (at the time of closure)
- Area served: United States; Puerto Rico
- Key people: Michael Foss (CEO)
- Products: Apparel; Sports equipment; Footwear; Exercise equipment
- Number of employees: 15,250 (2016)
- Parent: Kmart (1990–1994); Gart Sports (2003–2006)
- Website: Archived official website at the Wayback Machine (archive index)

Sports Authority, Inc. (formerly The Sports Authority) was an American sports retailer based in Englewood, Colorado. At its peak, Sports Authority operated 463 stores in 45 states and Puerto Rico. The company's website was on the GSI Commerce platform and supported the retail stores as well as other multi-channel programs. A joint venture with ÆON Co., Ltd., operates "Sports Authority" stores in Japan under a licensing agreement.

On March 2, 2016, Sports Authority filed for Chapter 11 bankruptcy, and the case was converted to Chapter 7 a few months later. On May 18, 2016, the company's stores were sold to a group of liquidators and on May 25, CEO Michael Foss announced that all of the stores would close by the end of August 2016. On June 30, 2016, Dick's Sporting Goods won the auction for Sports Authority's brand name and intellectual property.

On July 15, 2016, the online store closed operations, redirecting users to the Dick's Sporting Goods website. On July 21, 2016, the purchase of Sports Authority's intellectual property by rival Dick's Sporting Goods was approved.

== History ==
=== Gart Brothers ===
Gart Brothers, or Gart Bros. began in 1928, when Denver Post newspaper carrier Nathan Gart started the company with $50 (~$938.00 in 2025) in fishing rod samples.

In 1971, the Gart Bros. Company opened the "Sportscastle" superstore in Denver, Colorado, at the corner of 10th Avenue and Broadway in a building that had housed auto dealerships for decades. The 1980s marked a period of substantial growth for the company through a series of acquisitions. These mergers included Hagan's Sports Ltd. (1987) and Stevens Brown of Salt Lake City (1987). In the fall of 1992, Leonard Green & Partners acquired Thrifty and became the company's largest shareholder.

=== Sportmart ===
Sportmart was co-founded by Larry J. Hochberg and Sanford Cantor in 1971, with their first store opening in Niles, Illinois. The company primarily operated in the Western and Midwestern United States, eventually expanding to approximately 60 stores across nine states. The company also briefly operated in Canada in the 1990s. Gart Bros. and Sportmart merged in 1998, with both names continuing to operate as separate stores.

=== Oshman's ===
Oshman's Sporting Goods was founded in Houston, Texas, in 1919 by Jake Oshman. By 1965, Oshman's had become the largest sporting goods chain in Texas, operating 43 Oshman's SuperSports USA stores and 15 traditional stores. In 2001, the company merged with 120-stores Gart Bros., two years before eventually merging with and changing their name to Sports Authority.

=== Sports Authority ===
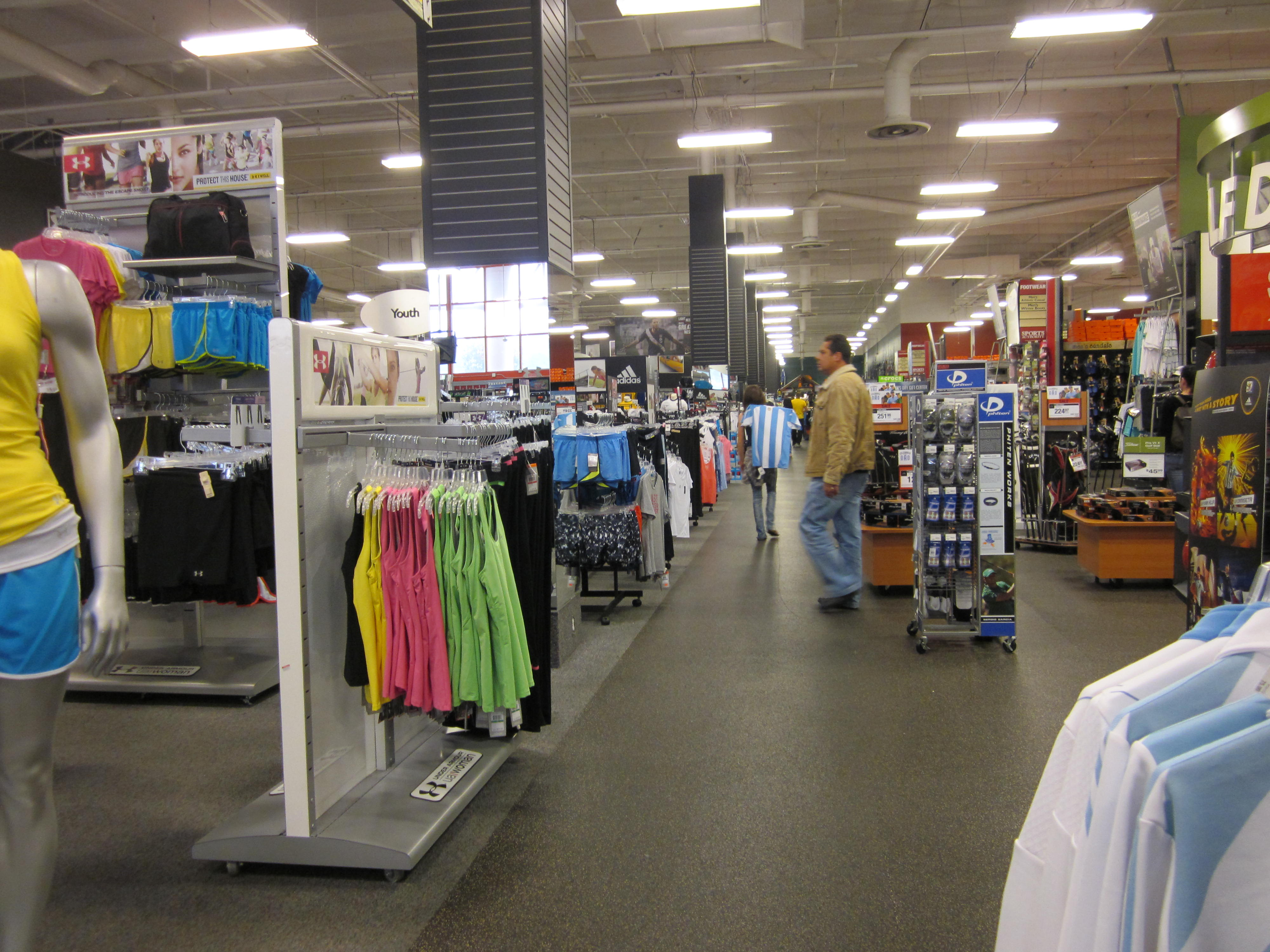
Interior of a Sports Authority in Daly City, California

The Sports Authority, Inc., was founded in Lakes Mall in Lauderdale Lakes, Florida, by a syndicate of venture capital groups and several key founding executives. Jack A. Smith, formerly COO of Herman's World of Sporting Goods, CEO; Roy M. Cohen, senior vice president and general merchandise manager; Richard Lynch, senior vice president and CFO and Arnold Sedel, vice president of stores operations, were the founding executives. The venture capital syndicate was led by William Blair Venture Partners and included First Chicago Venture Partners, Bain Capital, Phillips-Smith Venture Partners, Marquette Venture Partners, and Bessemer Securities.

The Sports Authority, Inc. opened its first store in November 1987 in Fort Lauderdale, Florida. In 1990, Kmart acquired the company. At the time of acquisition, Kmart had opened two sporting goods stores in Metro Detroit under the Sports Giant name and converted these stores to the Sports Authority name. Five years later, The Sports Authority had expanded to 136 stores in 26 states, and was spun off from parent Kmart.

Its headquarters were in Lauderdale Lakes, near Fort Lauderdale.

=== Gart Sports merges with The Sports Authority ===
Gart Sports, which also operated Oshman's and Sportmart, completed a "merger of equals" with The Sports Authority on August 4, 2003. At the time of its merger with the Gart Sports Company, The Sports Authority was the largest full-line sporting goods retailer in the United States, and had 205 stores in 33 states. The combined company took the Sports Authority name. With the merger, each share of Sports Authority was exchanged with 0.37 shares of Gart Sports which gave investors in each about 50% of the new merchant. The new company was based in Englewood, Colorado, which was the home of Gart Sports. Each store would continue to operate under their own name until all were re-branded to the Sports Authority identity in 2005 and 2006.

=== 2006 leveraged buyout by Leonard Green & Partners ===
In January 2006, Sports Authority agreed to be purchased in a leveraged buyout by affiliates of Leonard Green & Partners, a private equity investment firm, in a transaction valued at $1.4 billion (~$2.09 billion in 2024). Shareholders approved the deal in May 2006. Upon completion of the merger, Sports Authority ceased to be a publicly listed stock. There were also no public bonds outstanding, and Sports Authority no longer filed financial statements with the SEC.

=== Copeland's Sports ===
In August 2006, Copeland's Sports, headquartered in San Luis Obispo, California filed for Chapter 11 bankruptcy, and on November 17, 2006, Sports Authority, through a wholly owned subsidiary, assumed the leasehold interests in seven former Copeland's Sports retail store locations.

=== S.A. Elite ===
Sports Authority launched new store brand "S.A. Elite" in mid-2010, based on consumer research and testing. These stores are smaller than typical Sports Authority outlets and carry high-end sports apparel and accessories.

== Bankruptcy and liquidation ==
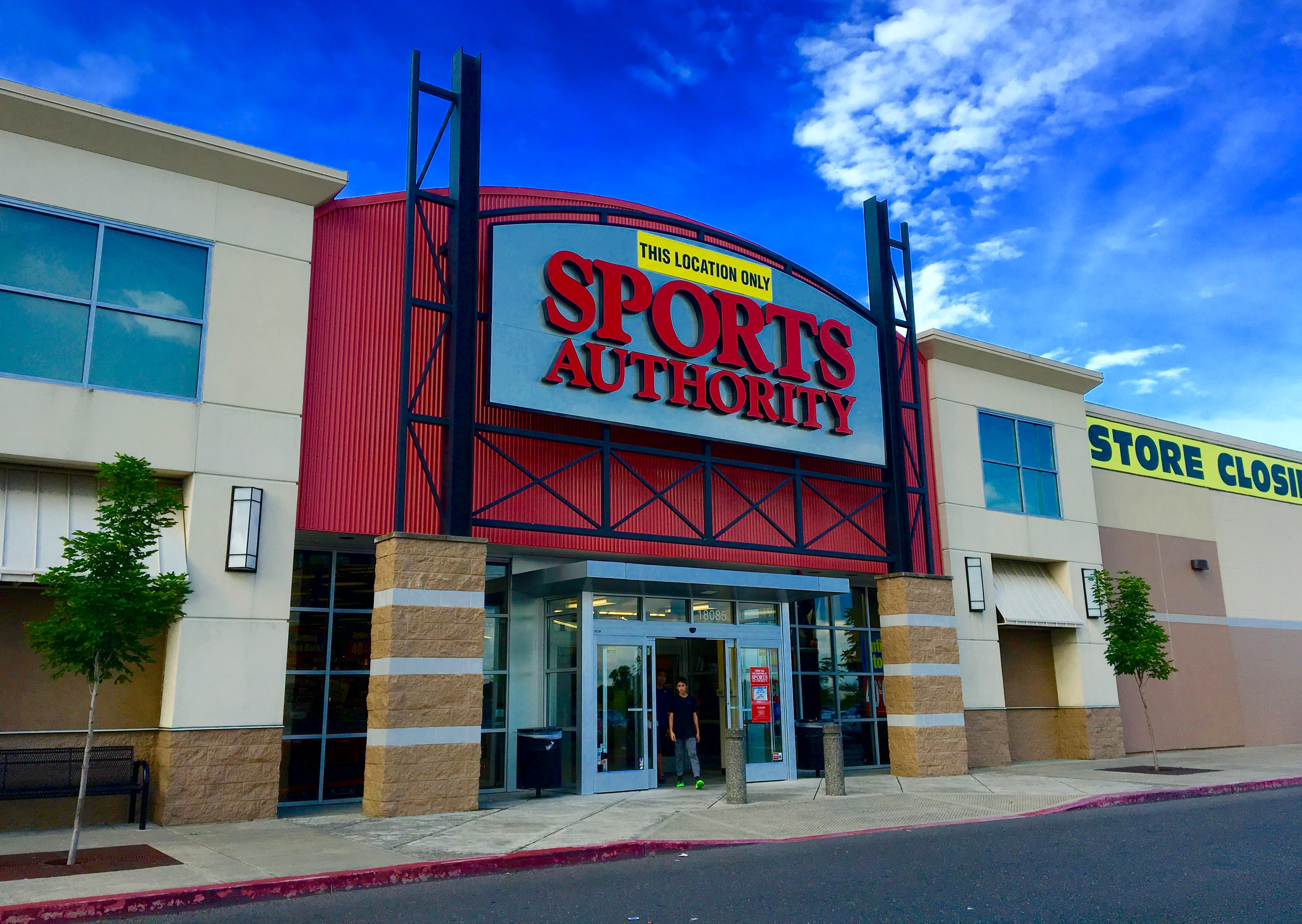
A Sports Authority store in Tanasbourne, Oregon on May 20, 2016, with sign announcing closure of the store.

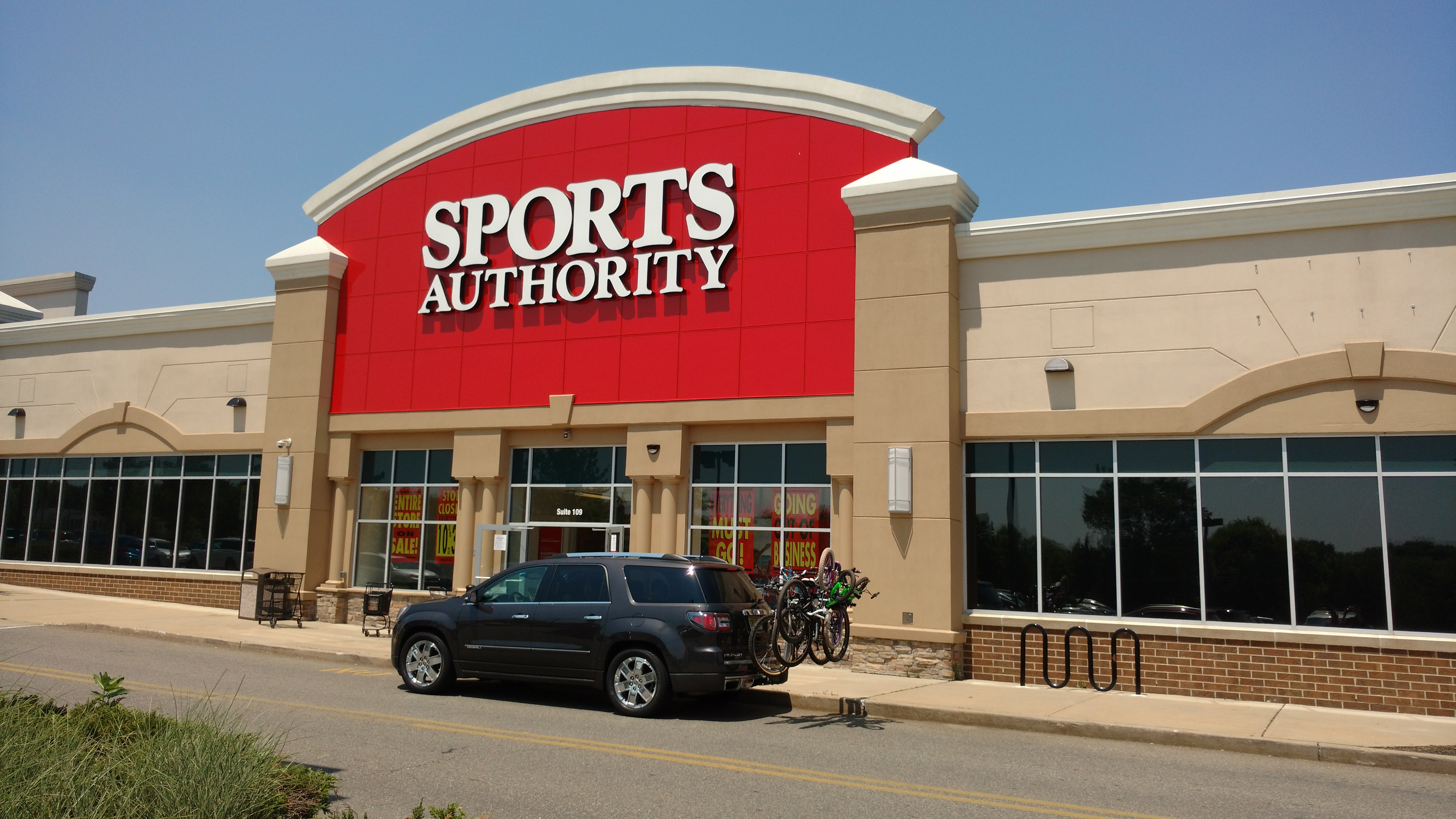
Another Sports Authority Store, this one in former Borders of Flemington, New Jersey, as seen on May 28, 2016. This location also has signs announcing the store's impending closure.

On February 4, 2016, it was widely reported that Sports Authority was set to declare Chapter 11 bankruptcy due to debt problems. Later that month, The Dallas Morning News reported that the company planned to close all 25 of its stores in Texas. The report did not specify a date for the closures. On March 2, 2016, Sports Authority filed for Chapter 11 bankruptcy. After considering restructuring, Sports Authority announced that on April 26, they would sell all of their assets, including all of the remaining store locations. Earlier in April, Reuters reported that Academy Sports + Outdoors and Dick's Sporting Goods had expressed interest in purchasing Sports Authority's assets. On May 3, 2016, the company notified the US Bankruptcy Court that it would not reorganize its debt but would auction its assets. Contrary to media reports, the company announced it would not be liquidating its assets, but would be auctioning off its stores and operations, with the intended goal of keeping all of its stores open. On May 18, however, it was announced that the effort to avoid liquidation was unsuccessful, causing the Chapter 11 bankruptcy filing to be converted to Chapter 7. The stores would in fact be closed, part of the American retail trend known as the retail apocalypse.

As of July 28, 2016, the Sports Authority website redirected to the Dick's Sporting Goods website.

== Brands ==
Sports Authority sold different brands of sporting goods from many different vendors. The company also sold products under its own private labels, including Alpine Design (seasonal clothing and outdoor goods), Sims (seasonal clothing and snowboards), Aspire (women's sportswear), SA Gear (men's sportswear and fitness equipment), Tommy Armour and Ram (Golf), Parkside (outdoor games and trampolines), and Bodyfit by Sports Authority (fitness accessories). Many of these products were made by other manufacturers and branded with the Sports Authority private labels.

== Sports Authority Field at Mile High ==
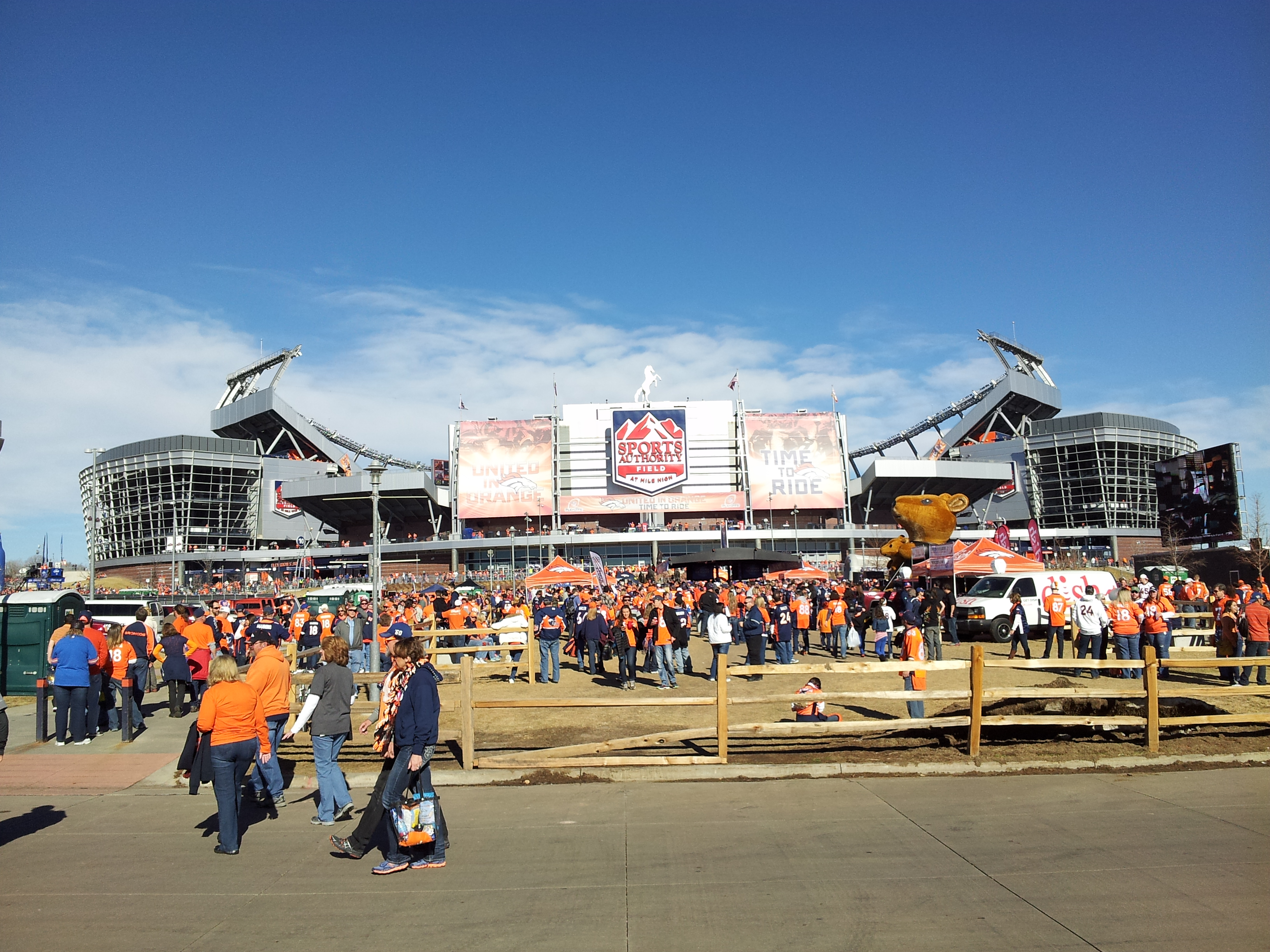
What is now Empower Field at Mile High.

Sports Authority owned the corporate naming rights to Sports Authority Field at Mile High, a stadium in Denver, Colorado, which is the home of the Denver Broncos. The Denver Broncos purchased the stadium naming rights in August 2016, and has since removed the Sports Authority name from the stadium. By June 20, 2018, the stadium operated under the name Broncos Stadium at Mile High until Empower Retirement took over in September 2019.

== Competition ==
Sports Authority's major competitor stores included:

- Academy Sports + Outdoors
- Big 5 Sporting Goods
- City Sports
- Dick's Sporting Goods
- Steve & Barry's
- MC Sports
- Modell's
- REI
