= Grand & Toy =

Canadian office product supplier

- Formerly: OfficeMax Grand & Toy (2013–2014)
- Type: Subsidiary
- Founded: 1882; 144 years ago
- Founder: James Grand
- Headquarters: Toronto, Ontario, Canada
- Products: Office supplies, technology, health & safety, furniture and interior services
- Number of employees: 1,100
- Parent: OfficeMax (1996–2013); The ODP Corporation (2013–present)
- Website: www.grandandtoy.com

James Grand and Samuel Toy at the first store on Leader Lane and Colborne Street, Toronto, 1883

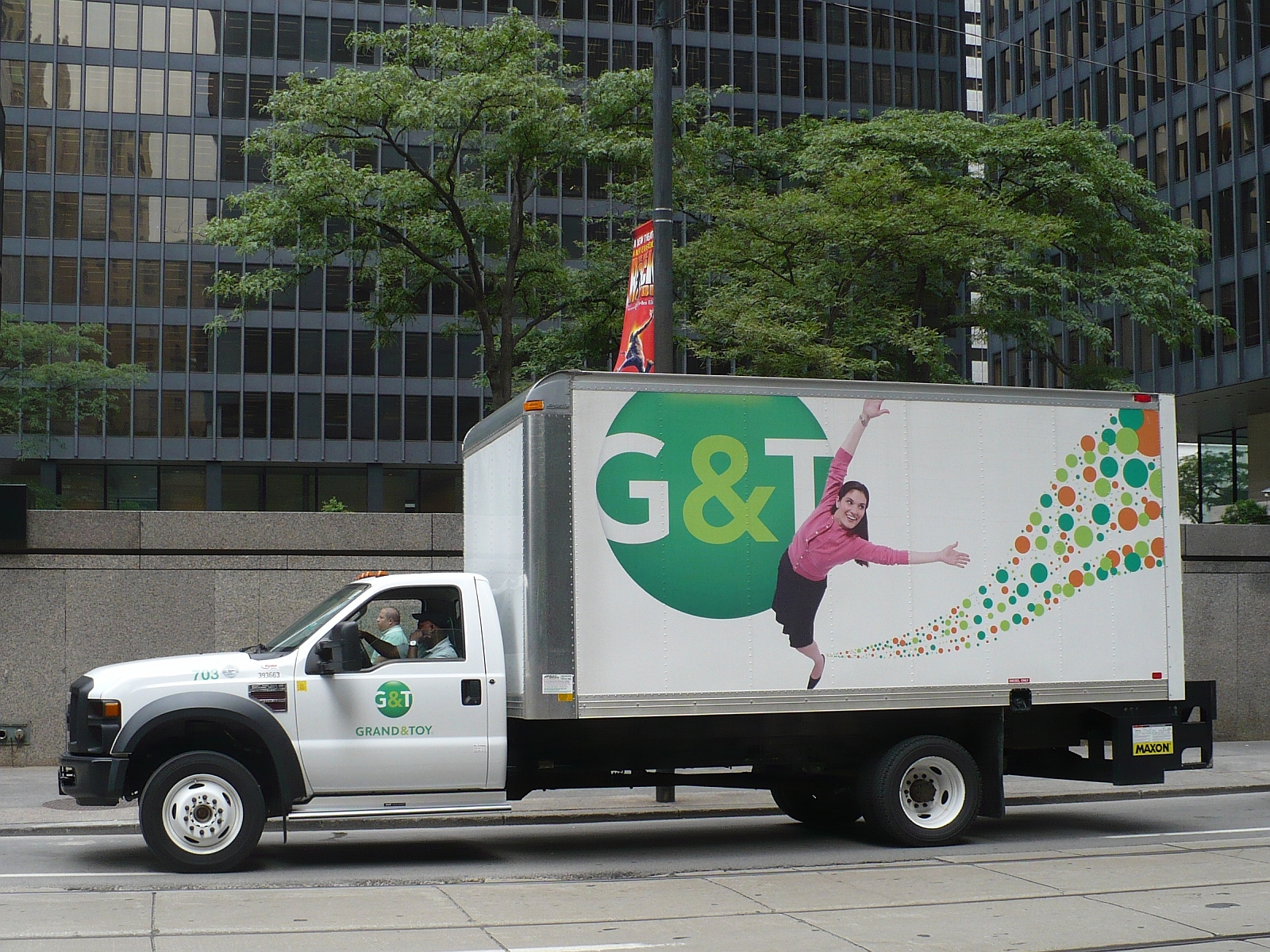
Delivering to the Toronto Dominion Centre

Grand & Toy is an American-owned, Canadian-based B2B end-to-end supplier of office products and services, founded in 1882 by James Grand as a home-based stationery printing business. It is a subsidiary of The ODP Corporation, whose other brands include Office Depot and OfficeMax, and is itself a subsidiary of the American private equity firm, Atlas Holdings LLC.

== History ==
Grand & Toy was founded in 1882 by James Grand as a home-based stationery printing business. A year later, Grand partnered with his brother-in-law, Samuel Toy, to open their first retail store. In 1895, the business moved to a larger location and grew to have a staff of twelve. Samuel Toy died in 1906, leaving James Grand in control of the company. In 1912, Grand & Toy added an office furniture department, and four years later, the business added printing facilities and a bindery. In 1921, Percy Grand took over the business following his father James's death.

By 1982, when the company celebrated its centennial anniversary, Grand & Toy had 35 locations. In 1990, the Grand family sold Grand & Toy to Toronto-based Cara Operations. In 1996, Grand & Toy was purchased by Boise Office Solutions, later renamed OfficeMax, a US-based international office supplies distributor, for US$104 million. By 2013, the company had repositioned itself as an end-to-end provider of business solutions.

In 2008, the company's distribution network, one of the largest in Canada, made 8.4 million deliveries.

In early 2013, the company rebranded as "OfficeMax Grand & Toy", as part of an effort by its U.S. parent company to present a unified brand to customers across North America. However, by the end of the year, OfficeMax had merged with U.S. competitor Office Depot.

On 23 April 2014, OfficeMax Grand & Toy announced it would be focusing on online retail, which accounted for 97% of its sales. The company closed its remaining 19 retail locations.

In December 2014, the Canadian operation announced it would rebrand back to simply "Grand & Toy", explaining the reversal as an expression of "confidence in Grand & Toy's brand legacy and a strong commitment to its long-term success".

In 2016, Grand & Toy and TerraCycle Canada announced a national retailer recycling program for office products. The program includes recycling for coffee capsules, office supplies, and computer accessories.

In May 2021, Office Depot announced that it would be splitting into two companies: ODP and NewCo. NewCo will include Office Depot’s business solutions division and Grand & Toy.

== Corporate social responsibility ==
As of 2015, Grand & Toy's social responsibility efforts include waste and recycling programs, green products and services, thought leadership and business insights, and transportation efficiency.
