= George L. Mikan III =

American businessman

George Lawrence Mikan III (born April 9, 1971), is the founder, chairman and chief executive officer of Shot-Rock Capital. He is CEO of Bright Health Group, Inc. He was president of ESL Investments, Inc. Mikan was the interim CEO of Best Buy Co. Inc. from April to September 2012, and a director from April 2008 to December 2012. He was a senior executive over a 14-year period at UnitedHealth Group.

== Biography ==
He earned his bachelor's degree University of St. Thomas in 1994. His father, Larry Mikan, was a basketball player for the University of Minnesota. Larry's father (George's grandfather, after whom George is named) was NBA Hall of Famer George Mikan, known as "Mr. Basketball" and one of the league's first true superstars.

== Career ==
Mikan began his career in 1994 at Arthur Andersen LLP, where he worked in accounting and financial services, gaining experience in corporate finance and business strategy. In 1998, he joined UnitedHealth Group, where he spent approximately fourteen years in a series of senior executive positions, culminating in his appointment as executive vice president and chief financial officer. During his tenure, he oversaw financial strategy, capital allocation, mergers and acquisitions, and corporate development as the company expanded into one of the largest healthcare organizations in the United States. He played a key role in numerous acquisitions that diversified the company's operations beyond health insurance into healthcare services, technology, and data analytics. Mikan was also instrumental in the creation of Optum, UnitedHealth Group's health services division, and served as its first chief executive officer. He helped develop the platform's strategy of integrating healthcare delivery, pharmacy services, technology, and data analytics into a unified business model. Under the strategic framework established during its formation, Optum grew into one of the largest health services organizations in the United States and became a major component of UnitedHealth Group's operations.

Following his departure from UnitedHealth Group, Mikan joined ESL Investments, the investment firm founded by Edward Lampert, where he later served as president. In that role, he oversaw investment strategy and corporate governance across a portfolio of retail and consumer businesses. Mikan joined the board of directors of Best Buy in 2008 and was appointed interim chief executive officer in 2012 following the resignation of Brian Dunn. During his tenure, he guided the company through a leadership transition and strategic review amid increasing competition from e-commerce before returning to his role as director later that year. He has also served on the board of directors of AutoNation, contributing to the company's governance and long-term strategic planning.

In 2019, Mikan joined Bright Health Group, a healthcare company focused on integrating health insurance with care delivery through value-based care models.

Following the company's initial public offering in 2021, he became president and chief executive officer, leading its strategic transformation as it shifted its focus toward healthcare delivery and physician enablement. The company rebranded as NeueHealth, reflecting its emphasis on technology-enabled care management and partnerships with healthcare providers. During his tenure, NeueHealth was taken private in a transaction valued at approximately $1.6 billion.

Mikan is the founder and chairman of Shot-Rock Capital, an investment and advisory firm that supports emerging businesses, particularly in healthcare, consumer services, and infrastructure.
