= Viking Direct =

Office supplies retailer

Viking Direct (Holdings) Limited
- Type: Subsidiary
- Industry: Office supplies
- Founded: 1960; 66 years ago in Los Angeles, California, United States
- Founder: Rolf Ostern
- Headquarters: Dublin, Ireland
- Area served: Europe
- Products: Print supplies, paper and mailing, technology, furniture, and writing instruments
- Number of employees: 1,300 (United Kingdom) (2021)
- Parent: Raja Group (2021–present)
- Website: www.vikingoffice.eu

Viking Direct, trading as Viking, is a European office supply mail order and online company based in Europe. It has operations in the United Kingdom, Ireland, Netherlands, and Germany and operates in a number of European countries. Its United Kingdom headquarters is in Leicester and its Netherlands headquarters is in Venlo and is registered in Ireland. The company is a mail order and online seller of office supplies to small and medium-sized business.

Since 2021 it has been part of the Raja Group. The company had previously been part of United States based Office Depot which had agreed to sell its European business including Viking as part of a failed merger with Staples in 2016.

== History ==
Viking began in 1960, as a small office supply retailer located in Los Angeles, California. The store was opened on January 7, 1960, by Rolf Ostern. Ostern supplemented the retail operation with a catalogue, and this would become the primary marketing technique of the company. In 1969 Ostern changed the name of his store to Viking Office Supplies and moved to a new location.

By the middle of the 1970s, Viking had established itself as a West Coast mail order retailer of discount office supplies to small and medium-sized businesses. At that time, the company began a geographic expansion.

Irwin Helford became chairman in 1984, and his photo appeared on the cover of Viking catalogues for many years.

On September 1, 1988, Viking was sold by its founders in a leveraged buyout to the VOP Acquisition Corporation. This company had been founded by Viking's management and the New York investment banking house of Dillon Read & Company, along with some of their affiliates, for the express purpose of purchasing Viking.

In December 1989, VOP was merged into its subsidiary, Viking Office Products, in preparation for the company's initial public offering of stock. On March 14, 1990, Viking offered stock to the public on the NASDAQ stock exchange, selling 2,300,000 shares at a price of $10.50 per share to raise $25 million.

The company made its first move overseas in September, 1990. At that time, Viking established a United Kingdom subsidiary, Viking Direct Limited, and opened a facility in Leicester, England. In making this move, Viking hoped to gain a toe hold in the European Economic Community before the planned unification of that market. In a brief time, Viking Direct became the largest mail order marketer of office supplies in the United Kingdom.

In May 1998, Viking Office Products merged with Office Depot. The following year the company began to move online, launching e-commerce site www.viking-direct.co.uk for the United Kingdom market.

In May 2016, following a failed merger with Staples, Office Depot Inc. agreed to sell its European business, including Viking, to Aurelius Group for an undisclosed purchase price. In 2021, Aurelius sold the business to the Raja Group.
