= James Grand =

- Born: 8 March 1857; Yorkville (Toronto), Canada West
- Died: 7 November 1921 (aged 64); Toronto, Ontario
- Resting place: St. James Cemetery
- Known for: Co-founder of Grand & Toy
- Spouse: Elizabeth Jane Toy
- Parent(s): James Grand and Mary Ann Grand
- Relatives: Percy Grand (son); James Grand II (son); James Grand III (grandson)

James Grand (8 March 1857 – 7 November 1921) was a Canadian businessman who founded the stationery store Grand & Toy with his brother-in-law, Samuel Martin Toy. Toy died in 1906, leaving the Grand family in control of the business, which they ran until 1990.

== Early life and career ==
James Grand was born in 1857 to English-born Anglican parents. In the 1870s he worked as a clerk and salesman, possibly in the stationery business of his brother-in-law William Leitch MacGillivray. Between 1878 and 1882 Grand and Frederick Perry worked in partnership as printers and railway and mercantile stationers.

In 1882, Grand continued selling stationary, now under his own name. He would buy paper on credit from wholesalers and hire young boys to deliver the goods by wagon. Grand started the business at his mother's kitchen table but demand grew quickly and in 1883, he signed a partnership agreement with Samuel Martin Toy, his brother-in-law and a bookkeeper, to form Grand and Toy. They opened the first Grand & Toy retail stores at the corner of Leader Lane and Colborne Street. Samuel Toy died in 1906, leaving James Grand in control of the company. Later, in 1921, when Grand died his son Percy took over the business. The company continued to be run by the family until 1990 when it was sold to Cara Operations.

== Personal life ==
Grand was married to Elizabeth Jane Toy in Toronto on 8 March 1881. They had three sons, including Percy Grand, who succeeded Grand as head of the firm until 1913.
