= Oshman's Sporting Goods =

American retailer (1919–2005)

Oshman’s Sporting Goods
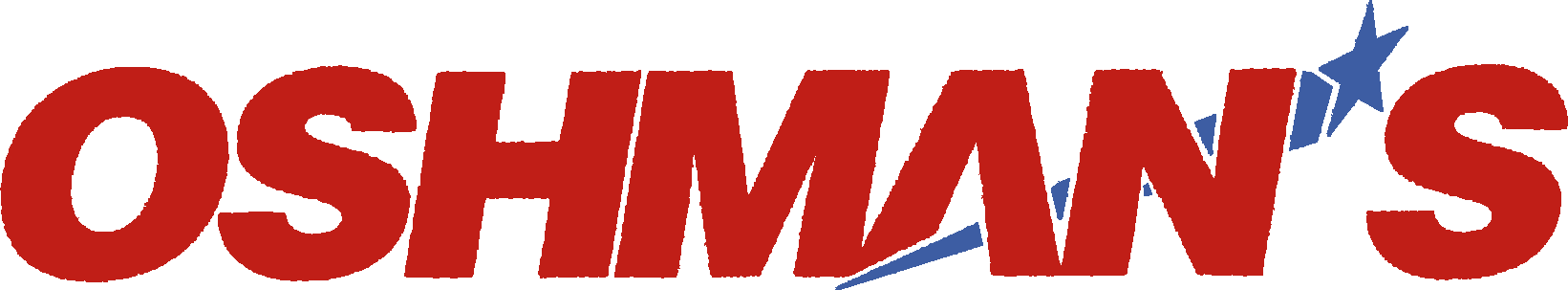
- Type: Private
- Industry: Retail
- Founded: 1919; 107 years ago (as Oshman’s Dry Goods); 1933; 93 years ago (as Oshman’s Sporting Goods)
- Defunct: 2005; 21 years ago
- Fate: Acquired by Gart Sports
- Headquarters: Houston, Texas
- Area served: United States
- Key people: J. S. “Jake” Oshman (founder)
- Products: Apparel, sports equipment, footwear, exercise equipment
- Parent: Gart Sports (2001-2005)
- Website: Oshman's Sporting Goods (Archive)

Oshman's Sporting Goods Inc. was a sporting goods retailer in the United States. Their headquarters were in East End, Houston, Texas. It operated traditional sporting goods stores and Oshman's Supersports USA megastores.

== History ==
=== Early years (1919–1945) ===
In 1919, J.S. "Jake" Oshman, an immigrant from Latvia, opened a store, Oshman's Dry Goods, in Richmond, Texas. In 1931 he moved to Houston by buying the stock of the bankrupt army-surplus store Crawford-Austin and liquidated its inventory. He discovered in the process that sporting goods, especially fishing and hunting supplies, sold well.

In 1933, he opened the first Oshman Outdoor Store, in downtown Houston at Capitol and Fannin.

=== Expansion and public offering (1946–1979) ===
Founded as a proprietorship, Oshman's business was incorporated as Oshman's Sporting Goods 15 years later, in 1946, as the country emerged from World War II. As business increased, the store moved to a larger location at 902 Main in Downtown Houston. Oshman's opened locations in suburban shopping centers in Greater Houston, and then, in Bay City, Beaumont, Corpus Christi, and Pasadena.

Oshman died in 1965. By that year Oshman's was Texas's largest sporting goods chain, and it was the largest sporting goods chain in the southwestern United States. At that time the company had ten sporting goods stores and two wholesale firms located in the Gulf Coast region.

In the 1970s, Oshman's was expanding in the Los Angeles area.

=== Acquisitions and growth (1980–current) ===
In 1978, Oshman's purchased the rights to the trade name of Abercrombie and Fitch from First National Bank of Chicago for $1.5 million ($5.2 million in 2013 dollars). At the time, Abercrombie and Fitch had filed bankruptcy and was a brand that sold fishing and hunting gear. Oshman's made plans to use the Abercrombie and Fitch name to create a mail-order business.

As of October 31, 1987 the company operated 185 traditional stores, one Super Sports USA store, and 27 Abercrombie and Fitch stores. Around December 25 that year it stopped its proposed $50 million sale (of which $20 million could be in banknotes) of the stores to an investor group in New Jersey. In 1988, Abercrombie was acquired by Limited Brands.

In 1993, the company stated that it planned to close 33 stores.

In 2001, Gart Sports Company announced that it would buy Oshman's for a combination of cash and stock valued around $82 million (~$138 million in 2024). In June of that year it merged into GSC Acquisition Corp., a wholly owned subsidiary of Gart. Many of Oshman's stores became Sports Authority stores; they have since closed after filing for bankruptcy in 2016.

== Corporate affairs ==
In 1991, the company stated that it would consolidate the offices of its California and Texas divisions into its headquarters in Houston. The company said that the competitive conditions of the retailing industry and the slowing economy prompted its move.
