= Bright Health =

American health insurance company

Bright Health Group, Inc.
- Type: Public
- Traded as: NYSE: BHG
- Industry: Health insurance
- Founded: 2016; 10 years ago
- Founders: Bob Sheehy, Kyle Rolfing, and Tom Valdivia
- Headquarters: Minneapolis, Minnesota, U.S.
- Key people: G. Mike Mikan (CEO)
- Revenue: ▲$400 million(2019)
- Number of employees: 1500

Bright Health Group, Inc. is an American health insurance company based in Minneapolis, Minnesota.

== History ==
The company was founded by Bob Sheehy, the former CEO of UnitedHealth Group#UnitedHealthcare, with partners Kyle Rolfing, Tom Valdivia and seed investor Flare Capital Partners, upon raising $81.5 million in venture capital in 2016. The company said it would focus on "consumer-centric" technology, facilitating patient experiences through digital interfaces. Bright Health is based in Minneapolis. It first began offering plans in Colorado in a partnership with Centura Health after several large insurers announced they would be pulling out of the state.

In 2017, Bright Health acquired the marketing firm Spyder Trap, and its founder became Bright Health's Chief Technology Officer. In June 2017, the company raised an additional $160 million in Series B funding. In September 2017, Forbes included Bright Health on a list of 25 "next billion-dollar startups". The company aligned with Mercy Health, the largest hospital system in Ohio, in July 2018 and partnered with Mount Sinai in New York to offer Medicare Advantage plans the next month. Bright Health closed a $200 million Series C financing round in November 2018, bringing the total raised to more than $440 million. It next began offering plans in the State of Arizona, before setting plans to sell in Alabama in 2018, partnering with Arizona Care Network (an insurer owned by Dignity Health and Abrazo Community Health Network) in Phoenix and Brookwood Baptist Health in Birmingham.

In 2019, Bright Health joined America's Health Insurance Plans, a trade association for health insurance companies, and expanded into parts of New York, Ohio, and Tennessee. It also raised an additional $635 million for expansion, bringing the total amount of funding to more than $1 billion. G. Mike Mikan, who formerly held leadership roles at UnitedHealth Group and Best Buy, joined as vice chairman and president in September 2019. By December 2019, Bright Health was operating in 22 markets in 12 states.

In January 2020, Bright Health appointed former Target executive, Cathy Smith, to be the new CFO, replacing Don Powers. That same month, the company announced it would acquire Brand New Day Health Plan, increasing its reach in the Medicare Advantage market. The acquisition also enabled Bright Health to begin offering services in California. Bright Health became Minnesota's first "unicorn" when it reached a valuation of $1 billion. G. Mike Mikan became the company's CEO in April 2020.

In 2020, the company promoted former Periscope CEO, Liz Ross, to the post of new chief marketing officer. Bright Health raised $500 million in Series E funding in September 2020.

In early 2021, Bright Health announced record membership growth, providing coverage to more than 500,000 consumers. The company also announced another acquisition in California, Central Health Plan of California Inc., further growing the Medicare Advantage business.

In April 2022, Bright Health announced it would discontinue offering plans in six states for 2023: Illinois, New Mexico, Oklahoma, South Carolina, Utah and Virginia. These markets were expected to contribute less than 5% of the company's revenue for 2022. In October 2022, Bright Health announced that it would close plans in Alabama, Arizona, Colorado, Florida, Georgia, Nebraska, North Carolina, Texas and Tennessee. In 2023 Bright Health was fined $1,000,000 and had its license revoked by the State of Nebraska Department of Insurance. The department found that Bright Health violated state law on 21,591 occasions.

In 2023, Bright Health announced it would sell its Medicare Advantage operations, including Brand New Day and Central Health Plan in California, to Molina Healthcare.

== Health insurance ==
The company began selling health insurance plans in 2017 and Medicare Advantage plans in 2018, in reaction to the Affordable Healthcare Act. Bright Health works with "narrow networks" of specific doctors and hospitals to suppress the cost of healthcare for those enrolled in their program and facilitate coordination of care. The company works in cooperation with major health systems in a market to design a network of services around those providers. Bright Health refers to these providers as "care partners". As of April 2021, it operates in more than 50 markets in 13 states and provides virtual and in-person care to more than 220,000 patients. The company also has three technology components: a user interface, a data analytics module, and a platform that works with electronic medical records and telemedicine companies.
