= Richard M. Schulze =

American billionaire businessman (born 25 March 1941)

- Born: Richard Michael Schulze; March 25, 1941 (age 85); Saint Paul, Minnesota, U.S.
- Occupation: Businessman
- Known for: Founder of Best Buy
- Spouse(s): Sandra J. Schulze (deceased); Maureen Schulze
- Children: 10

Richard Michael Schulze (born March 25, 1941) is an American billionaire businessman. He is the founder of Best Buy and was chairman and CEO. On the Forbes 2016 list of the world's billionaires, he was ranked number 722 with a net worth of US$2.4 billion.

== Early life and education ==
Richard M. Schulze was born and raised in Saint Paul, Minnesota, where he attended Central High School. He subsequently spent time in the U.S. Air Force with the Minnesota Air National Guard. After the Air Force, he worked as a consumer electronics salesman.

He has an honorary degree from the University of St. Thomas in Saint Paul.

== Career ==
In 1966, mortgaging his home, he founded an audio equipment store named Sound of Music in Saint Paul. The company expanded to nine stores, and after a tornado destroyed one, he had a "tornado sale" at one location with a very large selection of goods and low prices. The sale was a hit, and he renamed the chain Best Buy and shifted the model to a superstore format with 18,000-sq-ft stores, everyday low prices, and a heavy advertising budget. The format was very popular and thanks to increased demand for consumer electronics (especially with the advent of VCRs), the chain grew to 40 stores in 1989. Thereafter, he eliminated the commission model (customers disliked aggressive sales) and expanded Best Buy's offerings to include computer software, music, movies, and computer hardware. In 1994, he increased the average store size to between 45,000 and 58,000 sq ft. In 1995, the chain had $5 billion in sales and 155 stores. In 1996, Best Buy added appliances and kitchen utensils to its lineup.

In May 2012, Schulze announced that he was stepping down as Best Buy chairman after an investigation found that he knew that the CEO was having a relationship with a female employee and did not alert the audit committee.

As announced on August 6, 2012, Schulze made a bid to buy out the Best Buy company. According to the report, he already owned 20% of the company. This news caused the share price of Best Buy to go up slightly. By late February, talks between Best Buy Co. and Schulze ended. Private equity investors and he sought three board seats in exchange for acquiring a minority stake in the company, but he was not able to line up the funding.

On March 25, 2013, Best Buy Co. Inc. announced that Schulze would rejoin the company that he founded with a new title: chairman emeritus. The Richfield, Minnesota-based retailer also announced that two former executives, Brad Anderson and Al Lenzmeier, will serve as Schulze's representatives on the board of directors. They are key Schulze allies who had advised him on his attempt to buy the company.

== Philanthropy ==
Schulze has pledged to give away $1 billion to charity and education. In 2000, he donated $50 million to the University of St. Thomas to support a new school of entrepreneurship. Schulze is a trustee and chair of the Richard M. Schulze Family Foundation (RMSFF), which he founded after stepping down as CEO of Best Buy in 2002. Based in Minneapolis, the foundation focuses on education, health, human services, and medicine, in Minnesota and Florida. As of 2018, it was among the five largest private foundations in Minnesota.

RMSFF donated approximately $49 million to the Mayo Clinic in 2006 to establish a new cancer research center in Rochester, and $40 million to the University of Minnesota in 2008 for diabetes research. As part of its entrepreneurship initiative, RMSFF donated $500,000 annually to support scholars, faculty, and an online idea exchange, as of 2015. RMSFF has also funded the Catholic Schools Center of Excellence to increase enrollment at Catholic schools in Minnesota via information-sharing, training for teachers, and technology improvements. Since 2016, RMSFF has supported a non-profit organization offering family assistance in Southwest Florida. In 2023, the foundation donated $4 million to Children's Minnesota for a pediatric hybrid intraoperative MRI neurosurgery suite, $20 million to the NCH Healthcare System for a new cardiac and stroke center in Naples, Florida, and $25 million to Allina Health to upgrade Abbott Northwestern Hospital in Minneapolis.

== Personal life ==
Schulze lives in Naples, Florida. He is a Catholic and was married to Sandra J. Schulze until her death in 2001, with whom he had four children. He remarried to Maureen Schulze and later divorced in 2021. On November 9, 1991, Minnesota Governor Arne Carlson designated the day as Richard M. Schulze Day.

Business positions
Preceded by Company under Best Buy name founded 1983 (formerly Sound of Music founded in 1966)	Best Buy CEO; 1983–2002	Succeeded by Brad Anderson
