= Lakes Mall =

Former shopping mall in Lauderdale Lakes, Florida, United States

- Location: Lauderdale Lakes, Florida, U.S.
- Coordinates: 26.167°N 80.204°W
- Address: State Road 7 and Oakland Park Blvd.
- Opened: 1972
- Closed: 1995 (demolished 1996)
- Developer: Lakes Mall Partnership
- Owner: Yoram Izhak
- Num. of stores: 83 (original mall)
- Num. of anchor tenants: 2
- Floor area: 465,000 square feet (43,000 m^{2}) (original mall); 274,632 square feet (26,000 m^{2}) (current mall)
- Floors: 1

Lakes Mall was an enclosed shopping mall in Lauderdale Lakes, Florida, United States. Opened in 1972, the shopping center initially featured Jefferson Ward and Britt's discount stores, and later included the first locations for the retail chains Office Depot and Sports Authority. The complex was torn down in 1995 and redeveloped as a strip mall.

== History ==
Lakes Mall opened in 1972, anchored by discount stores Jefferson Ward and Britt's, with other major tenants including a Pantry Pride supermarket and a McCrory dime store. By the 1980s, the mall was losing business to larger shopping centers in town. Also, Britt's closed in 1981, Pantry Pride in 1984, and Jefferson Ward in 1985. By 1986, the center had more than 25 vacancies; a year later, 42 of its 83 storefronts were vacant. Despite the increasing vacancies, the first Office Depot opened in the mall in 1986, and a flea market filled the former Britt's. Shortly after the Office Depot opened, the owners announced that they would begin renovating the mall with a "main street" theme.

Kmart bought the former Jefferson Ward building, converting part of it to a Builders Square home improvement store, while the rest became the first location of Sports Authority, a sports equipment store. Since Office Depot, The Sports Authority, and Builders Square did not open to the mall, traffic within the mall itself continued to decline. By 1989, the only other retailers inside were McCrory (which closed on December 31 that year), two restaurants, a men's clothing store, and some offices and service tenants. Also, the mall's owners filed a mortgage on it, but the mortgage holder was charged in a foreclosure suit because it also owned space in the mall and could no longer afford to pay rent. The city building inspector declared the building unsafe in April 1990.

Builders Square closed its store in July 1990 so that Sports Authority could expand both its retail floor space and headquarters. A month later, the last two tenants (an optician and dentist's office) moved out following a roof collapse, leaving only Sports Authority and Office Depot. In 1992, renovation plans were announced that called for demolition of the structure, except for those stores.

The mall was finally torn down in 1996, with Linen Supermarket, Mac Frugal's (which converted to Big Lots in 2002) and Smart & Final opening on portions of the former lot. Sports Authority moved out in 2003, moving its headquarters to suburban Denver, Colorado, and Big Lots closed the same year. Smart & Final also closed its Florida stores in 2003. The complex was purchased in 2008 by UrbanAmerica LP of New York City, and Florida Career College moved into a portion. In 2009, Ross Dress for Less opened on the north side of the mall, and Burlington Coat Factory opened at the south end in 2010. Yoram Izhak, also the owner of Lauderhill Mall, bought the property in May 2012.
