= Pacific Sales =

American company selling household products

- Type: Subsidiary
- Industry: Retail
- Founded: 1960; 66 years ago
- Founder: Gerald H. Turpanjian
- Headquarters: Richfield, Minnesota, U.S.
- Number of locations: 200+ (September 2019)
- Key people: Hubert Joly (executive chairman); Corie Barry (CEO); Mike Mohan (president and COO)
- Parent: Best Buy
- Website: bestbuy.com/pacificsales

Pacific Sales is an American retail firm based in Torrance, California. It is a subsidiary of Best Buy. They offer mid-range to luxury appliances, bathroom fixtures and home furnishings as well as an assortment of home electronics and other home improvement products.

== History ==
Pacific Sales was founded in 1960 by Jerry Turpanjian. When Pacific sales was purchased by Best Buy in 2006, the decision was made to keep the brand and company intact, unlike other companies such as Magnolia, which was absorbed into the Best Buy brand. Since then, Pacific Sales has opened over 35 stores in California, Nevada and Arizona, and had opened stores within existing Best Buy stores in Texas and Hawaii as well as California, Nevada, Oregon, Georgia, and Arizona to offer higher end appliances than are currently available in Best Buy. As of March 2023, they operate 20 full-assortment stores (those carrying major appliances as well as home electronics and home improvement) in California. In addition to these 36, they also operate 55 appliance-only stores located within existing Best Buy locations in California, Arizona, Hawaii, Texas, Minnesota, Virginia, Maryland, Georgia, and Iowa. Much of the business Pacific Sales does is in bulk as well as builder/contractor sales.

== Products ==
Pacific sales specializes in luxury appliances and other home furnishings. They carry brands such as Kohler, Hansgrohe, Sony and Pioneer Elite.
