= Brian J. Dunn =

American businessman

Brian J. Dunn (born 1959/1960) is an American businessman who was the chief executive officer of Best Buy, from April 2009 to April 2012, having worked there since 1985.

== Biography ==
He has also been on the board of directors of Dick's Sporting Goods since June 2006 and on the board of directors of the Best Buy Children's Foundation.

Dunn started working when he was 14 at a grocery store and did not attend college. He began at Best Buy when he was 24 as a salesman in 1985, when Best Buy had only a few stores. Dunn's mother, Ethel, was an accountant at Best Buy.

In 1989, Dunn became a store manager and in 1990 a district manager in Minnesota. He was promoted to regional manager for Ohio, Indianapolis and Philadelphia stores in 1996, and in May, 1998, rose to regional vice president of the northeastern region, leading Best Buy’s entry into that market. In March 2000, he was promoted to senior vice president of division 3 retail sales, encompassing all of Best Buy’s east coast operations. He was named executive vice president of U.S. retail in 2002, and president of North America retail in December 2004. Finally, he rose to chief executive officer, replacing Brad Anderson on June 24, 2009.

In April 2012, Brian Dunn resigned as Best Buy's CEO during an internal company investigation into allegations of personal misconduct stemming from an inappropriate relationship with a female Best Buy employee.

Business positions
Preceded by Brad Anderson	Best Buy CEO; 2009–2012	Succeeded by George L. "Mike" Mikan III (interim)
