= Mirakl =

French cloud-based e-commerce software company

- Industry: Computer software, E-commerce, Internet
- Founded: 2011
- Founder: Philippe Corrot; Adrien Nussenbaum
- Headquarters: Paris and Boston
- Number of locations: 12 offices
- Key people: Philippe Corrot; Adrien Nussenbaum
- Products: Mirakl Marketplace Platform; Mirakl Connect; Mirakl Ads; Mirakl Payout
- Number of employees: 750
- Website: mirakl.com

Mirakl is a French e-commerce software company headquartered in Paris, France and Boston, Massachusetts. It provides online marketplace software to retailers, manufacturers and wholesalers.

== History ==
Co-founders Philippe Corrot and Adrien Nussenbaum met in 2004 and founded Splitgames, a B2C e-commerce marketplace, together in 2006. Splitgames was acquired by Fnac, a French retailer specialized in consumer electronics and entertainment goods in November 2008. Philippe Corrot and Adrien Nussenbaum then worked to develop Fnac's Marketplace activity, leading it for three years. They left Fnac and created Mirakl in 2012.

In 2013, Mirakl opened its first UK office. Mirakl launched its Boston-area headquarters in 2015.

In 2019, Mirakl launched Mirakl Connect, a platform to connect the marketplace ecosystem.

In 2020, Mirakl was first included in the Next40 Index by the French Tech Mission in 2020, following a $300 million funding round that made it the 10th French unicorn. The same year, Mirakl launched 66 new online marketplaces, including platforms for Carrefour, H&M, Decathlon, and Kroger. The company launched its StopCovid19.fr platform to help distribute personal protective equipment to combat the COVID-19 pandemic. This included delivering 300,000 liters of hand sanitizer and 320,000 face masks in less than a week. Ahold Delhaize announced that it would launch its digital marketplace at the beginning of 2021 using Mirakl's software platform.

In 2021, it carried out the second-largest funding round in France, raising $555 million with a valuation exceeding $3.5 billion, and acquired Octobat, a specialist in invoice automation. The same year, Hudson's Bay partnered with Mirakl to launch its new third-party online marketplace on TheBay.com. In April, United Natural Foods partnered with Mirakl to develop North America’s first online wholesale food marketplace. In May 2021, Mirakl announced the release of new features, including categorization AI, unified dropship operations, and streamlined B2B selling. L'Oréal's SalonCentric rolled out a new e-commerce marketplace in June using Mirakl’s Marketplace Platform, and Debenhams did the same in October. In November 2021, Macy's, Inc. announced that it will partner with Mirakl to launch an online marketplace at macys.com and bloomingdales.com.

In 2022, it acquired Target2Sell, a company specializing in e-commerce site personalization, and launched its Mirakl Payout product.

In 2023, Mirakl generated over $8.6 billion in business volume on its platforms and announced the launch of its retail media product (advertising on e-commerce sites), relying in particular on a partnership with Havas. The same year, the company unveiled its new Boston offices located on 100 Summer Street.

In 2024, Mirakl acquired Adspert, a Berlin-based company that develops AI-powered software for automating and optimizing pay-per-click (PPC) advertising campaigns. The software uses AI to automate bid management for e-commerce ads on platforms such as Amazon, eBay, Google, Bing and Walmart.

In 2025, Mirakl launched Mirakl Nexus to address agentic commerce.

== Fundraisings and valuation ==
Date	Round	Fundraising (USD)	Lead Investor	Valuation (USD)
16 November 2012	Series A	$30M	Elaia	
22 July 2015	Series B	$20M	83North, Felix Capital	
28 February 2019	Series C	$70M	Bain Capital Ventures	
22 September 2020	Series D	$300M	Permira	> $1.5 bn
21 September 2021	Series E	$555M	Silverlake	> 3.5 bn
1 August 2023	Debt	$100M	BNP Paribas, HSBC, Natixis, Société Générale, JP Morgan Chase	

== Customers ==
Mirakl has set up SaaS marketplace platforms for over 450 companies globally including: Carrefour, Conrad Electronics, Astore by Accor, Kroger, H&M, Best Buy Canada, L'Oréal, Galeries Lafayette, Urban Outfitters, Decathlon, United Natural Foods, Hudson's Bay, Ahold Delhaize, Debenhams, J.Crew, Bunnings and JB-Hi-Fi.
