= Brad Anderson (executive) =

American chief executive (born 1949)

Bradbury "Brad" Anderson (born April 29, 1949) is the former CEO and vice chairman of the American consumer electronics retailer Best Buy.

== Early life and education ==
Born and raised in Sheridan, Wyoming, Anderson received an Associate of Arts from Waldorf College and a bachelor's degree from the University of Denver.

== Career ==
In 1973, Anderson joined Sound of Music, a small chain of stereo stores that was the precursor to Best Buy, as a commissioned salesman.

Best Buy's founder, Richard Schulze, named him vice president in 1981. In subsequent years, Schulze and Anderson turned the chain from a commission-driven store to a discount store, warehouse-style format.

In 1986, Anderson was promoted to executive vice president and was elected to Best Buy's board of directors. In April 1991, he was promoted to president and chief operating officer, vice chairman in 2001 and, in June 2002, he assumed the position of chief executive officer. In June 2009, he was succeeded by Brian J. Dunn who had been president and chief operating officer.

Anderson is on the Waldorf College Board of Regents and the General Mills board of directors. He is also on the board of PragerU, a website that produces education videos from a conservative viewpoint.

== Compensation ==
In the 2006 fiscal year, he received a salary of $1,164,283 and a bonus of $2,692,250. His annual compensation for the 2007 fiscal year was $5.6 million, including $1,172,995 in salary, plus $2,650,969 in incentive-plan compensation. In 2008, he was paid $49.3 million in total compensation, $1,172,995 in salary, $1,994,092 in incentive-plan compensation, stock awards of $413,635 and no option awards, and $46.08 million in value from exercising 1.05 million stock options.

Business positions
| Preceded by Richard M. Schulze | Best Buy CEO; 2002–2009 | Succeeded by Brian J. Dunn |
