= City Sports =

American sporting goods retailer

- Company type: Private
- Industry: Sportswear and athletic equipment
- Founded: Boston, Massachusetts, United States (1983)
- Headquarters: Eatontown, New Jersey, United States
- Products: Clothing, shoes and equipment
- Owner: City Sports USA Inc
- Website: City Sports

City Sports is an American sporting goods retailer that re-launched in the spring of 2017 after being purchased during bankruptcy liquidation in December 2015. Founded in 1983 by Mike Kennedy and Eric Martin, two Boston locals, the company grew across state borders and operated 27 stores in eight states. Post-bankruptcy the company now operates an e-commerce site with plans for future brick and mortar locations.

== History ==
In November 1983, high school friends and tennis partners Mike Kennedy and Eric Martin were living and working in Boston and were frequently unable to find quality branded sporting goods merchandise in a single downtown location to satisfy their year-round athletic interests. Frustrated with their lack of success in finding the appropriate gear, they opened the first City Sports location on Massachusetts Avenue and began selling quality sporting goods merchandise with an emphasis on running and racquet sports.

Over the next thirty years, City Sports grew into an award winning specialty sports retailer in metropolitan locations along the east coast. At its peak, the company operated 27 stores across seven states (Massachusetts, New York, Rhode Island, Pennsylvania, Maryland, and Vermont and Washington, D.C.).

=== Acquisition by Highland Consumer Fund ===
On March 11, 2008, the company announced that it had been acquired by the Highland Consumer Fund, a subsidiary of Highland Capital Partners, an investment firm. Highland purchased an 80% stake in the company, and planned to nearly triple the number of stores within the next five years. Ultimately, Highland estimated that the business had the potential to grow to around 300 stores across the United States. Both parties declined to release financial details of the deal.

=== Bankruptcy and relaunch ===
City Sports Inc. filed for Chapter 11 bankruptcy protection on October 5, 2015, with assets and liabilities of between $10 million and $50 million. The filing, made in the United States Bankruptcy Court in the District of Delaware, listed the sporting retailer's biggest creditors as Nike (which is owed $1.27 million), Under Armour ($1.03 million), Asics ($1.03 million), and Patagonia ($1.01 million). On November 5, it was announced that all 27 City Sports stores would close; liquidation sales at all of the stores began the following day. In January 2016, the brand assets were purchased by new owners with plans to re-launch City Sports and eventually open new storefronts in urban markets. In April 2017, City Sports announced the relaunch of the e-commerce site and citysports.com.

In July 2017, the company announced they would be opening a pop-up store and sponsoring the Boston Triathlon with logos on the race bags and swim caps. City Sports is currently focused on fitness-oriented customers through multiple e-commerce platforms. The iconic City Sports T-shirts are the most popular item on the web store.
