= Office Depot =

American office supply holding company

The ODP Corporation

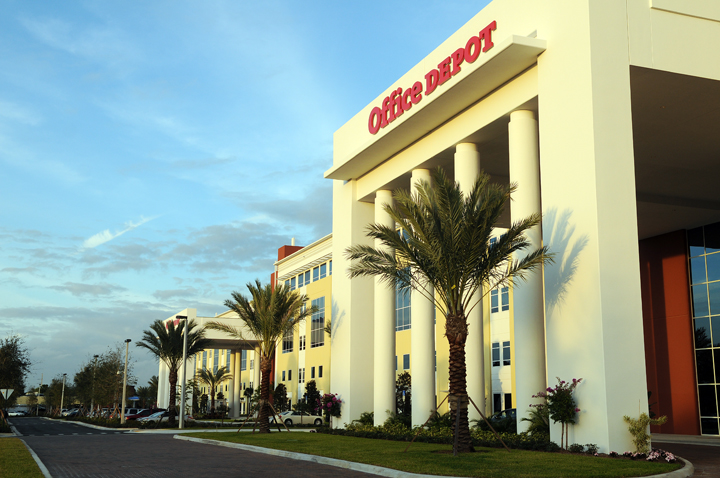
- Office Depot headquarters in Boca Raton, Florida
- Formerly: Office Depot, Inc. (1986–2020)
- Type: Public
- Traded as: Nasdaq: ODP; Russell 2000 component
- Industry: Specialty retail
- Founded: October 1986; 40 years ago
- Founder: F. Patrick Sher
- Headquarters: Boca Raton, Florida, U.S.
- Number of locations: 869 retail locations (2024)
- Area served: North America
- Key people: Gerry Smith (chairman and CEO) D. Anthony Scaglione (CFO)
- Products: Office and Business Supplies, Technology, JanSan and Cleaning and Breakroom Furniture, Copy & Print, Shipping Services
- Brands: ODP Business Solutions, Office Depot, OfficeMax, Veyer, Varis, Grand & Toy, Ativa, TUL, Foray, Realspace, DiVOGA
- Revenue: ▼US$6.99 billion (2024)
- Operating income: ▼US$163 million (2024)
- Net income: ▼US$−3 million (2024)
- Total assets: ▼US$3.53 billion (2024)
- Total equity: ▼US$807 million (2024)
- Owner: Atlas Holdings (2025–present)
- Number of employees: 19,000 (2025)
- Subsidiaries: OfficeMax; Grand & Toy
- Website: officedepot.com

The ODP Corporation, doing business as Office Depot, is an American office supply retailer headquartered in Boca Raton, Florida. The company has combined annual sales of approximately $7 billion, and employs about 19,000 people in the United States.

It operates 922 retail stores in the United States under the Office Depot and OfficeMax brands, as well as e-commerce sites and a business-to-business sales organization. In September 2025, it agreed to be taken private by Atlas Holdings for $842.2 million.

In December 2025, it was announced the acquisition had been completed for approximately $1 billion and subsequently Office Depot became a private company. As part of the transition, Craig Gunckel was appointed chief executive to lead the firm's retail and B2B business operations across North America.

== History ==
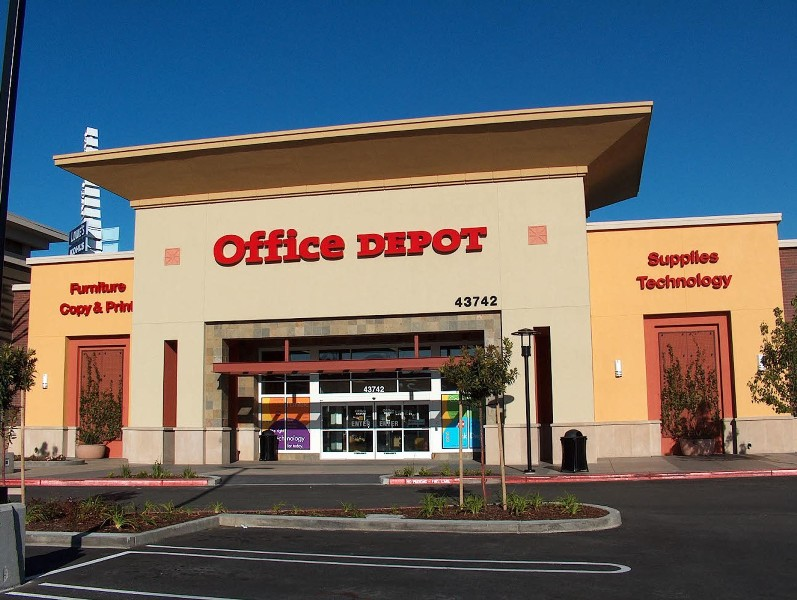
Office Depot store in Fremont, California (2009)

Office Depot was founded in October 1986 (40 years ago) by F. Patrick Sher, Stephen Dougherty, and Jack Kopkin, who became the company's chairman and chief executive officer, the president, and executive vice president respectively. All three were formerly associated with Mr. HOW Warehouse, a home improvement company that Sher sold to Service Merchandise in 1983. The first store, located at the Lakes Mall in Lauderdale Lakes, Florida, opened in October 1986. The company announced its initial public offering of stock, and went public in December 1988.

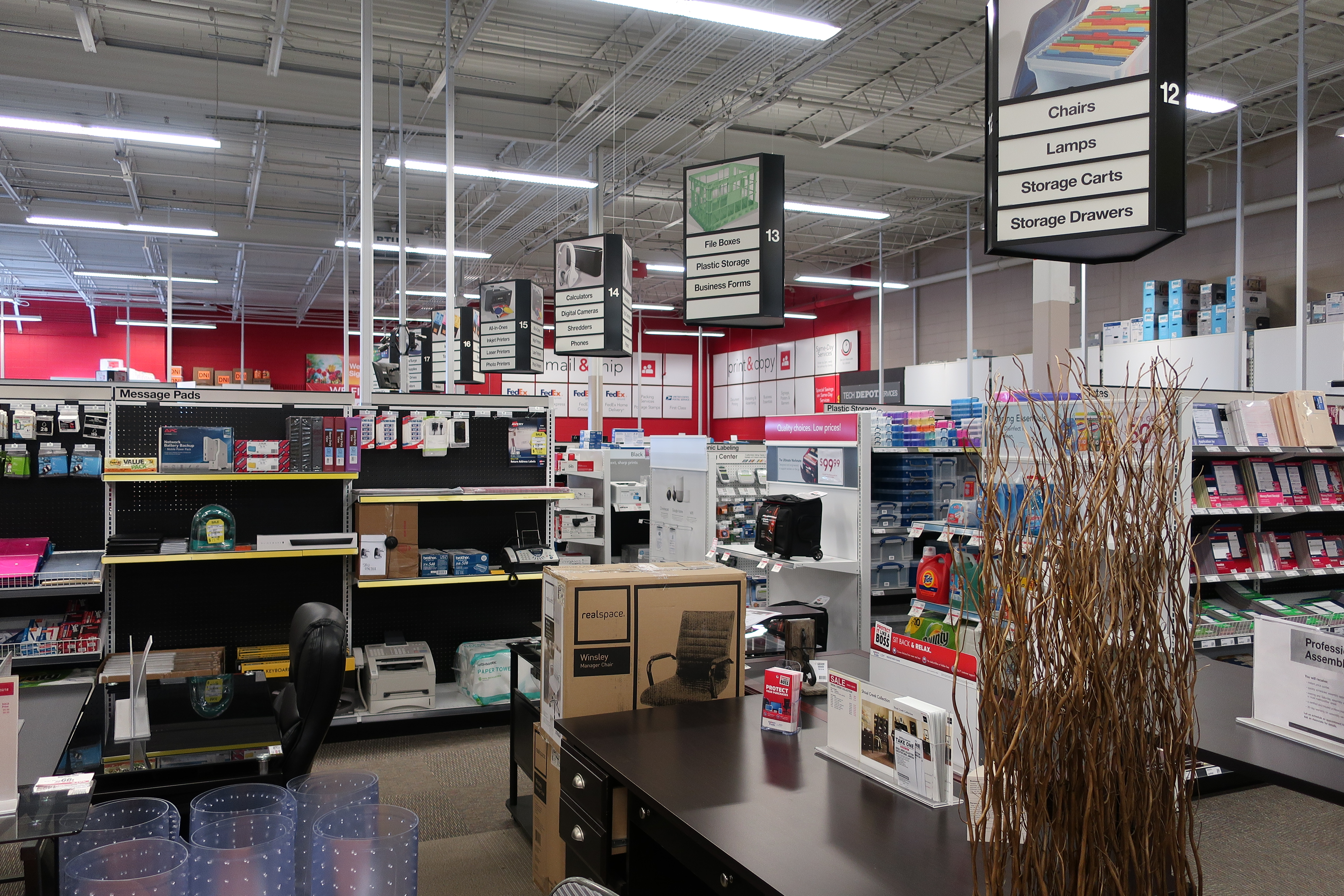
Interior of an Office Depot in Gillette, Wyoming (2018)

=== Mergers and acquisitions ===
In April 1991, it merged with Office Club, which provided an expansion to the West Coast. In 1995, Office Depot entered the Mexican marketplace in a joint venture with Grupo Gigante, making it the retailer's first international expansion. Office Depot then entered the European and Australian direct mail market, after acquiring Viking Direct in May 1998.

In 1997, Office Depot and Staples attempted a merger. On July 18, 1997, the Federal Trade Commission (FTC) reported that a federal district court in Washington, D.C. granted their request for a preliminary injunction, blocking Office Depot and Staples from merging as one company.

In December 2001, Viking Direct expanded to Central America with new retail stores in El Salvador, Guatemala, and Costa Rica through a joint licensing agreement. Office Depot sold Office Depot Europe (Viking Direct's parent) to an investment firm in September 2017.

On February 20, 2013, it was announced that Office Depot and OfficeMax would combine in an all-stock deal, pending regulatory approval and stockholder approval. The merger was completed on November 5, 2013. In May 2014, Office Depot announced the closure of four hundred stores, due to declining sales and customer migration to e-retailers.

On February 4, 2015, it was announced that rival Staples had agreed to purchase Office Depot, in a cash and stock deal worth approximately $6.3 billion. However, the Federal Trade Commission voted to block the merger in December 2015. The United States District Court for the District of Columbia granted the FTC a preliminary injunction against the merger on May 10, 2016, resulting in the proposed merger's termination.

In January 2017, Gerry Smith was named as the company's new CEO, effective February 27. Smith was the chief operating officer at Lenovo Group.

Office Depot bought technology services firm CompuCom in 2017 to position the company to provide technology services. In January 2021, Office Depot acquired enterprise procurement software provider BuyerQuest.

=== Environmental initiatives ===
Office Depot built a LEED Gold-certified retail store in Austin, Texas, in April 2008. The Boca Raton headquarters was also awarded a LEED Gold certification in September 2010.

== Print and copy services ==
Office Depot offers a wide variety of printing services in store and online.

Office Depot and Canva reached a partnership on July 16, 2020. Office Depot incorporates Canva's design platform for its printing services.

== Private label brands ==
The company's portfolio of brands includes Ativa, TUL, Foray, Realspace, and DiVOGA.

== Sponsorships ==
In January 2005, Office Depot became a partner of NASCAR, with the title "Official Office Products Partner of NASCAR". In the same year, the company signed on as the primary sponsor of the #99 Ford Fusion, owned by Roush Fenway Racing and previously driven by Carl Edwards. They sponsored Edwards until the end of the 2008 NASCAR Sprint Cup Series season.

In December 2008, Office Depot announced that it would become the co primary sponsor for Tony Stewart and the No. 14 Chevrolet at Stewart–Haas Racing in 2009. In September 2012, Office Depot announced it would not renew sponsorship with Tony Stewart or SHR.

In November 2012, Office Depot partnered with the Born This Way Foundation to sell limited edition office supplies and give 25% of earnings to the organization.

== FTC settlement ==
In March 2019, Office Depot and Support.com, Inc., a California-based tech support software provider, agreed to pay a total of $35 million to settle Federal Trade Commission allegations that the companies tricked customers into buying millions of dollars' worth of computer repair and technical services by deceptively claiming their software had found malware symptoms on the customers' computers.

== See also ==
- Staples Inc.
