= Boise Cascade =

American wood and materials manufacturer

Boise Cascade Company
- Formerly: Boise Cascade Corporation
- Type: Public
- Traded as: NYSE: BCC; S&P 600 component
- Industry: Forest products
- Founded: 1957, 69 years ago
- Headquarters: Boise, Idaho, US
- Key people: Jeff Strom (CEO)
- Products: Wood products Building materials
- Revenue: ▼US$6.40 billion (2025)
- Net income: ▼US$133 million (2025)
- Website: www.bc.com

Boise Cascade Company is an American manufacturer of wood products and wholesale distributor of building materials, headquartered in Boise, Idaho.

A public company with sales over $7.9 billion in 2021, it is traded on the New York Stock Exchange (NYSE) under the symbol BCC. Boise Cascade Wood Products manufactures plywood, engineered wood products and lumber; it supplies a broad line of wood products and building materials through Boise Cascade Building Materials Distribution's 38 distribution locations.

The company has approximately 6,000 employees across North America.

The company is distinct from the Canadian paper company Cascades, and although it serves as the namesake for the Packaging Corporation of America-owned paper company Boise, Inc., this was formed from the assets of its spun off paper and packaging divisions in 2008.

== History ==
Boise Cascade Corporation was formed in 1957 through the merger of Cascade Lumber Company of Yakima, Washington, and Boise Payette Lumber Company of Boise. Robert Hansberger of Boise Payette became the CEO, and the new corporation focused on ownership and management of timberlands, the growing and harvesting of timber, and the manufacturing and distribution of lumber products and building materials. By late 1958, the company had established more than 100 retail outlets for its wholesale distribution business. That same year, BC's first paper mill became operational in Wallula, Washington, to produce corrugated shipping containers.

The 1960s saw the company's swift expansion into the forest products industry, as well as wide variety of other businesses. Boise Cascade owned concrete ready-mix plants, plastic manufacturing plants, textiles, and sand and gravel companies. In 1964, the company entered office products distribution. The mid-1960s brought an even more diverse portfolio including ownership of a motor home manufacturer, a cruise line, involvement in real estate and recreation projects, and an acquisition in the engineering and construction business for major utilities. Boise native William Agee joined the company in 1964 and was the chief financial officer from 1969 to May 1972; the stock price rapidly rose to $77 in 1969, but was down to $15 by the fall of 1971.

Boise Cascade's current headquarters in Boise was built in 1970, designed by architecture firm Skidmore, Owings & Merrill. With the share price at around eleven dollars, Hansberger resigned in October 1972; John Fery was promoted to CEO and moved the company back to its core competencies of building materials and paper products. As the 1980s progressed, a decline in the housing market led to a downsizing in building products distribution business, and by 1987, all retail outlets had been sold or closed.

In the early 1990s, the company sold the wholesale portion of its office products distribution business while keeping the consumer business. In the 1990s, Boise Cascade invested in engineered wood products, building mills in White City, Oregon, and in Alexandria, Louisiana, for producing laminated veneer lumber (LVL). Boise Cascade introduced the finger-jointing technique for manufacturing LVL that remains unique to the EWP industry today. After leading the company for 22 years, Fery retired in 1994, and George Harad was named CEO. During his tenure, the company focused on expanding its activity in distribution and reducing its presence in manufacturing. In 1999, Furman Lumber of Billerica, Massachusetts, was purchased, which led to a nationwide building material wholesale distribution system for Boise Cascade.

The next decade continued to bring big changes. In 2003, the company acquired OfficeMax. In 2004, Madison Dearborn Capital Partners purchased the paper, forest products and timberland assets and created a privately owned company called Boise Cascade LLC. Remaining portion of the company changed its name to OfficeMax and traded with ticker OMX. When Tom Stephens began as CEO of Boise Cascade, LLC in 2004, the company had incurred $3.2 billion in debt to fund the acquisition. The company's 1.6 million acres of timberlands were sold in 2005 to help pay down that debt. Three years later, a publicly traded shell company bought the pulp and paper operations and became Boise, Inc., allowing Boise Cascade to pay off most of the remaining debt. The timing was fortuitous when, in 2008, the housing market collapsed and tough times ensued for the entire industry. Tom Carlile assumed the position of CEO in 2009, and began to lead the company through the slow housing recovery with investments in EWP and veneer facilities and the building materials distribution footprint. By late 2012, the company prepared to launch an IPO, which was completed on February 6, 2013, when it rang the bell at the NYSE.

Jeff Strom is the current CEO.

== Operations ==
The company operates through two vertically integrated divisions:

- The Wood Products division manufactures engineered wood products (EWP), plywood and lumber for wholesalers, retail dealers and builders to meet residential and commercial construction needs. The division has manufacturing facilities are located in the Pacific Northwest and southeastern U.S., and one mill in Canada at St. Jacques, New Brunswick. BC owns and operates the world's two largest laminated veneer lumber (LVL) and I-joist manufacturing plants, and is the #2 producer of engineered wood products and #2 producer of plywood in North America.
- The Building Materials Distribution division stocks an extensive inventory of structural building products used from the foundation to the roof, including engineered wood, siding, composite decking, metal, insulation and more from over 1,100 third-party suppliers. The division delivers orders by truck and rail to home improvement centers, retail lumber dealers, and industrial customers. There are 35 distribution branches nationwide, making it the largest wholesale building products distributor in the U.S.

== Corporate governance ==
Boise Cascade's executive leadership includes CEO Nate Jorgensen, Kelly Hibbs (CFO, SVP and Treasurer), Mike Brown (EVP, Wood Products) and Jeff Strom (EVP, Building Materials Distribution). The company's board of directors is currently led by Chairman Tom Carlile, former CEO and CFO of Boise Cascade.

After over-extending into non-traditional areas under CEO Hansberger and young CFO Agee, the company nearly went into liquidation in 1972. A management team under new CEO Fery got the company back to basics through the rest of the 1970s.

After the purchase of OfficeMax in 2003, Boise Cascade separated its distribution and manufacturing businesses the following year. The pulp and paper assets of Boise Cascade L.L.C. were sold to an investment firm in 2008, then acquired by Packaging Corporation of America in 2013 and became its Boise Paper division. Boise had entered the paper side of the forest products industry in 1958 with a new mill in treeless Wallula, Washington.
