= Highland Superstores =

Defunct appliance/electronics store chain

Highland Superstores, Inc.
- Industry: Retail
- Founded: Highland Park, Michigan, 1933
- Founder: Harry Mondry
- Defunct: 1993
- Fate: Liquidation
- Area served: Midwestern United States
- Products: Consumer electronics and home appliances

Highland Superstores was an American consumer electronics and home appliance chain. It was founded in 1933 as Highland Appliance by Harry Mondry in Highland Park, Michigan. By the end of the 1970s, the chain had 18 stores throughout the midwest with headquarters in Plymouth, Michigan.

The chain went public in 1985 and had 84 stores, at which point it was the second-largest American electronics retailer behind Circuit City. Despite its number of locations, the chain began to experience financial troubles in the late 1980s and early 1990s. In 1990, Highland hired an investment firm to decide the chain's future. At this point, it had also expanded into New York and Texas. Upon fierce competition in Texas, they left the area in 1991 and announced they would concentrate on keeping their remaining 50 stores in the Midwest.

Highland filed for Chapter 11 bankruptcy in August 1992, and liquidated its last 30 stores in 1993.
