= Champlain Mall =

Shopping mall in Brossard, Quebec, Canada

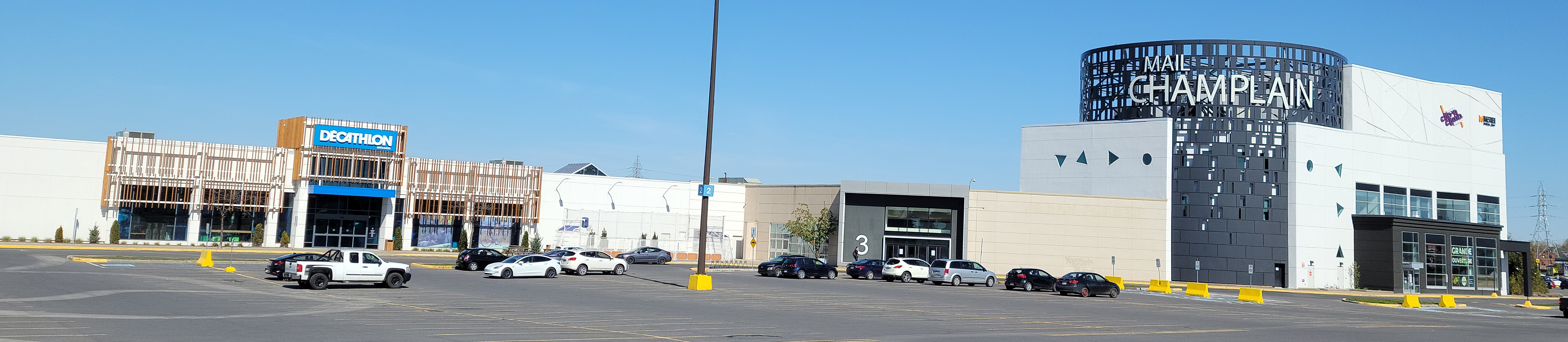
- Coordinates: 45°28′23.91″N 73°28′13.26″W
- Address: 2151, boulevard Lapinière; Brossard, Quebec, Canada; J4W 2T5
- Opened: 30 October 1975
- Developer: Ivanhoe Corporation
- Manager: Cominar Investment Trust
- Owner: Cominar Investment Trust
- Num. of stores: +- 150
- Num. of anchor tenants: 5
- Floor area: 715,000 sq ft (66,400 m^{2}). (GLA)
- Floors: 1
- Parking: Outdoor and 4-level parking garage Capacity: 4140 cars
- Public transit: Panama; Terminus Panama
- Website: mailchamplain.ca/en

The Champlain Mall (French: Mail Champlain) is a shopping mall located in Brossard, Quebec, Canada, at the intersection of Taschereau Boulevard and Lapinière Boulevard. Champlain Mall is named in honour of Samuel de Champlain but references the Champlain Bridge that was built 13 years prior to the mall's opening.

Champlain Mall is strategically located in Brossard: on the South Shore's longest commercial artery Taschereau Boulevard (Quebec Route 134), near Autoroute 10 and adjacent to Terminus Brossard-Panama. Thus, the mall attracts about 6.4 million visitors every year.

== History ==
Champlain Mall's history goes all the way back to October 1957, before the city of Brossard was founded, when Ivanhoe Corporation, through its business partner Westmount Realties Company, acquired a series of lots from La Prairie-de-la-Madeleine Parish with the intent of building a shopping centre at the corner of what is now Provencher and Pelletier boulevards. After Ivanhoe submitted a request on September 12, 1960 to the emerging City of Brossard for the development of land for the shopping mall, it took 15 years for the Champlain Mall to be constructed.

Champlain Mall inaugurated in the fall of 1975 at 300,000 sq ft (28,000 m^{2}) with 60 stores, and Sears and Steinberg's as major anchors. Sears and Steinberg's had themselves been opened to the public since the beginning of the year, respectively on March 12 and April 1975. In the case of Sears, it was its first location in Greater Montreal. The Champlain Mall was developed by Ivanhoe Corporation, a wholly owned real estate unit of Steinberg's.

A first expansion opened on September 1, 1977 brought in 35 new stores allowing Champlain Mall to now have more than 100 tenants. New arrivals included Miracle Mart, Arlington, Cardinal and Taylor's. Miracle Mart's name was subsequently shortened to M in August 1986.

Another expansion was completed in August 1988 which saw the mall reached more than 700,000 sq ft (65,000 m^{2}). As part of this phase was the appearance of The Bay which inaugurated its store on August 3, 1988. An estimate of 50 new boutique spaces were added. The portion of Champlain Mall that was added during this expansion corresponds to the two mall wings that both lead to The Bay store. The current food court and multi-level parking lot also happened during that phase.

Champlain Mall was jointly owned by Ivanhoe and Kerrybrooke, the real-estate subsidiaries of Steinberg's and Sears Canada respectively. In 1990, Sears divested itself of 25% of its ownership in the Champlain Mall. In 1994, Ivanhoe acquired the remaining shares Sears held in the mall. Sears continued to be an anchor tenant for several decades.

On August 10, 1994, Les Ailes de la Mode opened the first store of its chain at the Champlain Mall in the former M store site.

An IMAX theatre was built in the mall in 1996. It was the largest IMAX theatre in the province and was one of the few in the world to use a personal sound environment headset and special 3-D glasses. The theatre eventually closed on November 6, 2000 over a contractual dispute between its operator TheMax Inc. and its content provider IMAX Corporation.

In early 1998, Archambault announced that it would open by the summer a 20,000 sq ft (1,900 m^{2}) megastore.

Sears completed in September 1998 a $20-million makeover of three of its stores at Champlain Mall, Galeries d'Anjou and Carrefour Laval.

A $40 million facelift was completed at the Champlain Mall in late 2011 to better compete against South Shore rivals Quartier DIX30 and Promenades Saint Bruno.

In October 2014, Ivanhoé Cambridge sold the Champlain Mall to Cominar.

On April 21, 2018, Decathlon opened its first Canadian store in the former space of Les Ailes de la Mode.

A Mayrand supermarket opened its door on July 15, 2020, occupying a good part of the former Sears location.

== Anchors and tenants ==
This is a list of the major anchors and tenants at Champlain Mall, organized by descending leased area.

=== Anchors ===
- Hudson's Bay (144,559 sq ft or 13,430.0 m^{2})
- Decathlon (60,000 sq ft or 5,574.2 m^{2})
- Mayrand (50,000 sq ft or 4,645.2 m^{2})
- Atmosphère/Sports Experts (37,542 sq ft or 3,487.8 m^{2})
- Archambault (17,664 sq ft or 1,641.0 m^{2})

== See also ==
- Brossard
- List of largest shopping malls in Canada
- List of shopping malls in Canada
