= Seaway Mall =

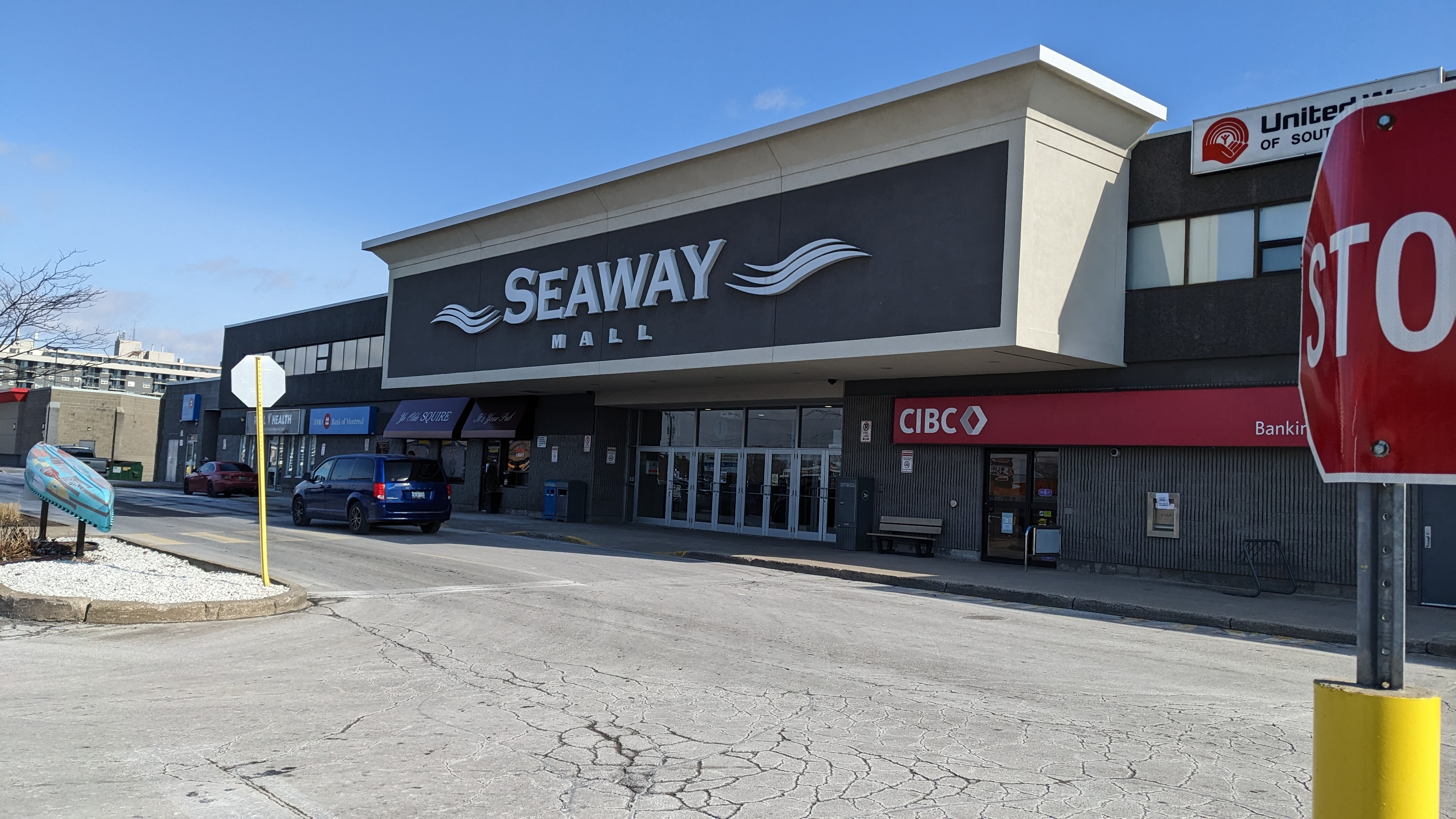
- Exterior of Seaway Mall
- Location: Welland, Ontario, Canada
- Coordinates: 43.01573°N 79.24687°W
- Address: 800 Niagara Street
- Opened: April 23, 1975
- Manager: Michael Belcastro (President 2006-Present)
- Floor area: 500,000 square feet (46,000 m^{2})
- Floors: 1 level of mall space, second level is offices
- Website: www.seawaymall.com

Seaway Mall is an enclosed shopping mall in Welland, Ontario, Canada. The mall has 500,000 square feet (46,000 m^{2}) of space and includes tenants such as Sport Chek, Cineplex Entertainment, Winners and Shoppers Drug Mart.

== History ==
Seaway Mall opened on April 23, 1975, with anchor stores Woolco, Kmart, Miracle Food Mart, a movie theater and 60 other stores. An expansion in the late 1980s added a Sears store, which opened in 1989. Around this time, the Miracle Food Mart was sold to A&P Canada, and the Seaway Mall store was shuttered. This space was eventually converted into a new mall wing, which features a Bulk Barn, and Dollarama, formerly (now defunct) discount store Bi Way. By the end of the 1980's the Seaway Mall added murals to its exterior, which contributed to a broader city wide effort to add art to the city.

In the late 1990s, both of the mall's discount department stores changed their names. Woolco was converted into a Walmart, and Kmart was converted into a Zellers after Kmart exited the Canadian retail market.

In the 2000s, chain stores such as Claire’s began to leave the mall for more upscale malls such as The Pen Centre. Walmart relocated to a larger building east of Seaway Mall in 2006. Zellers relocated into the former Walmart space, while the former Kmart/Zellers store was reconfigured into several smaller stores, such as Winners and Shoppers Drug Mart. Target bought the lease to the mall's Zellers store, along with many other Zellers stores across the country during its expansion into Canada. Target opened its doors in the summer of 2013. With the opening of Target, this made Seaway Mall one of the few Canadian malls to have featured three very large discount department stores from the United States: Walmart, Target and Kmart, operating in the same mall at different points in time.

In October 2012, a large Sport Chek opened up in the mall near Sears, which shuttered many smaller stores. In January 2015, Target announced it had filed for bankruptcy, and would discontinue all Canadian operations. Target closed its doors on April 1, 2015, leaving a vacancy in the mall's largest department store space. This was followed by the closure of the mall's Sears on September 30, 2015.

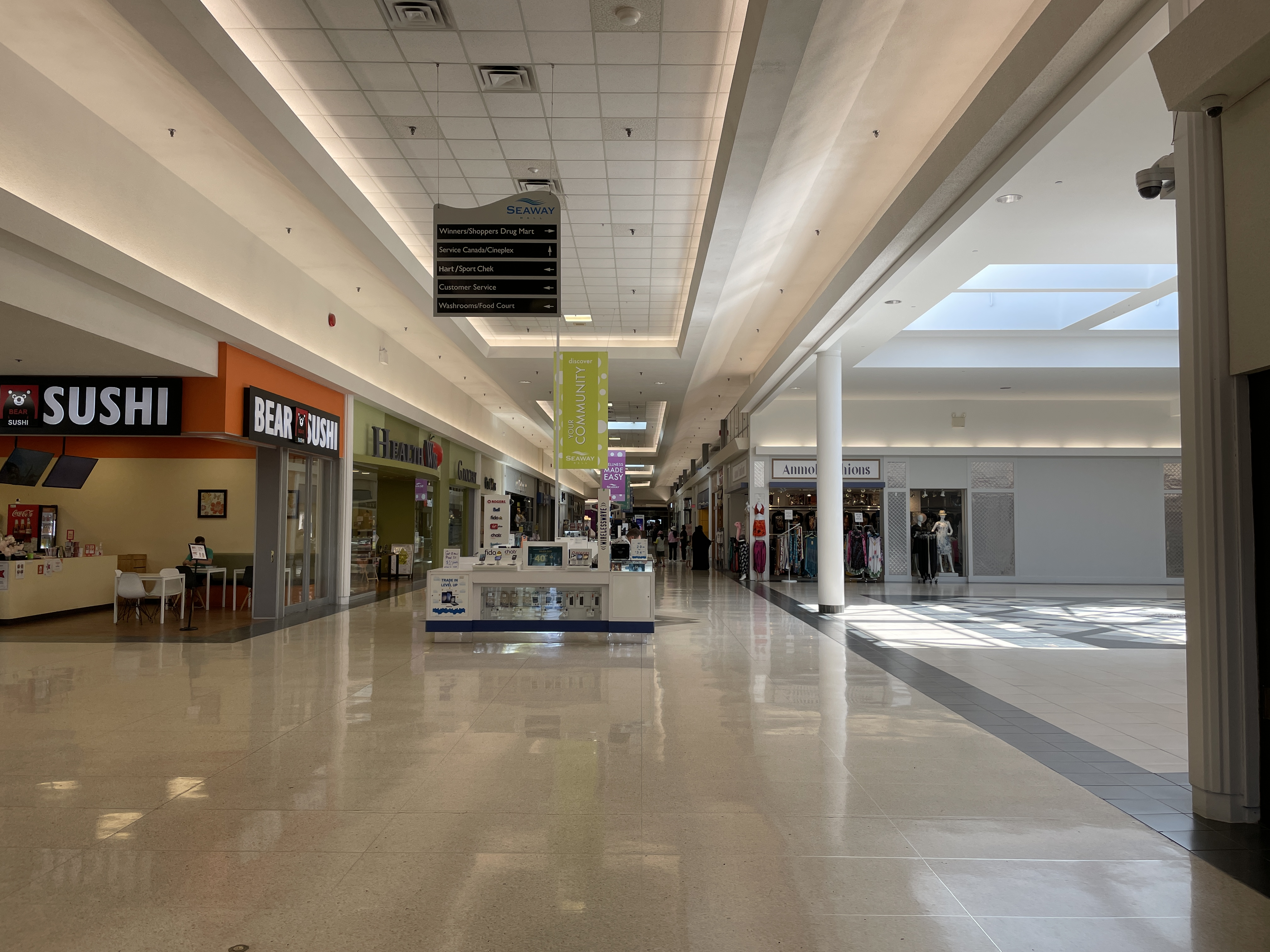
Interior of Seaway Mall

The former Sears is now split in half; half is occupied by a Staples, while the other half is operated by the Canadian discount store Hart.

In 2016, fashion chain Nygård International joined Seaway Mall with their store Alia N' Tanjay. In 2018, clothing brand Nygård announced the launch of a new concept store – Nygård Plus – located at Seaway Mall. This is the first Nygård Plus store in Canada, carrying plus-sized clothing from Nygård’s brands Alia, TanJay & Nygård Slims.

In 2017 casual dining restaurant chain Mr. Mikes opened its first location in Ontario on the Seaway Mall grounds. The Welland Public Library moved into Seaway Mall with a full-service public library which opened on June 27, 2017, in former mall space. A Booster Juice in the former Garage and a sushi restaurant in the former Ardene are some new tenants which were completed by the end of 2017.

In 2016, the jewellery store Envi Boutique and Modern Vision Family Fitness Facility, which used to be located in a small space (a former billiards lounge) above the movie theatre.

In 2023, local martial arts academy Welland Taekwondo opened a second location in the mall.

== In popular culture ==
Seaway Mall gained national attention when a flash mob was filmed singing the Hallelujah Chorus in the food court in November 2010. A video of the event went viral on YouTube, gaining 14.4 million views in less than a month. On 8 December, Canada AM broadcast a live performance from the same food court, drawing a crowd of about 500 people.

Welland was the site of the first scene filmed for the movie Meatballs. Actor Bill Murray appears in front of the Kmart at Seaway Mall.
