= Miracle Food Mart =

Supermarket chain in Ontario, Canada

- Type: Subsidiary
- Industry: Grocery Retail
- Founded: 1969
- Defunct: 1998
- Headquarters: Ontario
- Products: Groceries
- Parent: Steinberg

Miracle Food Mart was a supermarket chain in Ontario, Canada, owned by Steinberg's, a Quebec-based retailer in the 1970s and 1980s.

Steinberg purchased the Canadian division of Grand Union, with 38 stores, in June 1959 to make its entrance into Ontario. These stores operated under the Steinberg banner until January 1969, when the marketing program of "Miracle Discount Pricing" was introduced and the entire chain of stores was converted to the Miracle Food Mart banner. The marketing philosophy was a simple one, reduce all of the "fancy" advertising such as colour flyers, television and radio spots and offer everyday items at deeply reduced prices as a line item within the weekly black & white flyer. This move proved to be successful as the chain expanded quickly (to approximately 80 stores) over the next ten years, gaining a substantial increase in market share.

In 1973, the Miracle Food Mart division made a revolutionary move to abolish its general-image advertising and to mount a "give-'em-the-facts" consumer-oriented campaign. The program included a formal Consumer Bill of Rights, nutrition booklets, a key to the codes used to mark perishables, and clearly labelled price tags.

The supermarket flourished in the 1970s, and expanded with the Miracle Ultra Mart banner into bigger stores with a wide range of health care and general merchandise. The company spent C$30 million in improvements for its Miracle Food Marts in 1987, creating several large 24-hour food-and-drug stores called Miracle Ultra-Marts. The stores offered fresh fish and deli departments, party-planning services, kitchen centres selling microwave ovens, and hardware and electronic centres. In 1989, Steinburgs (the parent company) was sold by its heirs (Sam Steinburgs 5 daughters) to the Quebec based Socanov Industries, the chain was then sold to A&P Canada. A&P converted the Miracle Food Mart stores into A&P, Dominion or Food Basics stores, but continued the Ultra Mart banner (dropping the "Miracle"), which it later rebranded as Ultra Food & Drug.

Miracle Food Mart stores were often paired with Miracle Mart discount department stores (another Steinberg chain) in mall settings, some operating as one Miracle Beaucoup store. But in the latter years, they became stand-alone locations at smaller plazas across the Greater Toronto Area.

== Locations ==
=== Ontario ===
Most locations continue to be used as supermarkets, but some have been redeveloped for other retail or non-retail used:

Location	Later use	Current use (type if not supermarket)
Ajax - Harwood Place		now a Food Basics (Metro Inc.)
Barrie - Bayfield Mall	converted to Winners	now a Centra Food Market (Asian supermarket)
Belleville - Quinte Mall		Location split into Toys R Us (toy store), East Side Mario's (eatery) and Work Authority (other retail)
Bowmanville - Bowmanville Mall	converted to A&P	Acquired by Metro after sale of A&P Canada
Bramalea (Brampton) - Bramalea City Centre Operated with a Miracle Mart, for a time as a Miracle Beaucoup, later Miracle Ultra Mart	became Ultra Food & Drug, later converted to A&P in early 2000s	Acquired by Metro after sale of A&P Canada
Brampton - Hurontario Street & Steeles Avenue	converted to A&P	Food Basics - after Metro Inc. acquired A&P Canada
Brampton - Brampton Mall, Main Street South	converted to A&P	Acquired by Metro after sale of A&P Canada
Brantford - Lynden Park Mall	converted to A&P	Food Basics - after Metro Inc. acquired A&P Canada
Burlington - Fairview Street	converted to Ultra Food & Drug, then a Metro (closed in September 2014)	Now a Food Basics (Metro Inc.)
Burlington - Guelph Line and New Street	converted to Shoppers Drug Mart	Burned to ground, was rebuilt and remains as Shoppers Drug Mart
Burlington - Guelph Line at Upper Middle Roads		Food Basics - after Metro Inc. acquired A&P Canada
Cambridge - Cambridge Centre (Highway 24 & Bishop Street and formerly John Galt Centre with Miracle Mart as second anchor	converted to Bulk Barn and several smaller stores, then all relocated for H & M anchor store	Forever 21 (clothing retail)
Cambridge - Highland Shopping Centre (75 Dundas Street)	converted into Canadian Tire store	Canadian Tire
Chatham - 100 King Street West (Downtown Chatham Centre)	converted to Food Basics (Metro Inc.)	Closed and turned into other retail spaces
Chelmsford - Chelmsford Mall		Your Independent Grocers (YIG)
Dundas - University Plaza	converted to The Barn Markets (A&P Canada), then a Metro (closed in March 2019)	Canadian Tire
Etobicoke - Browns Line & Evans Avenue		Now a Farm Boy
Etobicoke - Eringate Mall, Renforth Road south of Eglinton Avenue		Demolished and replaced by residential dwellings
Georgetown - Highway 7	Acquired by A&P	Food Basics - after Metro Inc. acquired A&P Canada
Grimsby, Ontario Village Inn Plaza, Main Street		Food Basics - after Metro Inc. acquired A&P Canada
Guelph - Stone Road Mall		replaced by Chapters. Successor to Miracle Food Mart, Ultra Food & Drug, opened a new 56,000 Sq/ft store across the street and then rebranded as Metro in 2008.
Hamilton - Upper Gage at Fennell	converted to The Barn Markets	Acquired by Metro when A&P Canada sold
Hamilton - Upper Gage at Mohawk Road East		Food Basics - after Metro Inc. acquired A&P Canada
Hamilton - Upper James at Mohawk	converted to The Barn Markets (A&P Canada) and Canadian Tire	Metro after A&P Canada sold (closed in July 2019), now a Food Basics
Hamilton - Queenston Road & Nash	converted to Food Basics	Demolished and site now a Canadian Tire
Kitchener - Westmount Road at Ottawa	converted to Dutch Boy, then a Price Chopper (Oshawa Group)	FreshCo - after Sobeys acquired Price Chopper from Oshawa Group
London - Adelaide & Huron - store 266		FreshCo - after Sobeys acquired Price Chopper from Oshawa Group
London - Cherryhill Mall - store 247	converted to an A&P	Metro after sale of A&P Canada
London - Wonderland & Commissioners		Food Basics (Metro Inc.)
London - Baseline & Wharncliffe - store 278	converted to XS Cargo (closed in January 2013) & Nevada Bob's Golf (closed in August 2010) (other retail)	Demolished and now a Shoppers Drug Mart which was previously next to Nevada Bob's Golf
London - Oxbury Mall - store 248	converted to an A&P	Food Basics (Metro Inc.)
London - Bradley Square - store 270	converted to an A&P	Food Basics (Metro Inc.)
Markham - Markville Shopping Centre	Demolished	Site is now a Best Buy (electronic retail)
Markham - Shops on Steeles and 404	converted to Food Basics	Food Basics (Metro Inc.)
Erindale (Mississauga) - Westdale Mall Store 229	converted to Dominion, then a Metro	FreshCo (Sobeys)
Erin Mills (Mississauga) - Meadowvale Town Centre	became a A&P, then a Dominion	Metro after A&P Canada sale
Erin Mills (Mississauga) - Millway Plaza	converted as Food Basics	Giant Tiger (other retail)
Park Royal (Mississauga) - Park Royal Plaza Store 216	Dominion Save-A-Centre	Food Basics (Metro Inc.)
Malton (Mississauga) - Westwood Mall	Food Basics, closed February 2012 and demolished. Later converted to Walmart, closed in June 2021.	
Mississauga - Mississauga Marketplace (Hurontario & Eglinton)	Food Basics (Metro Inc.)	Oceans Fresh Food Market
Mississauga - High Point Mall (Dixie & Bloor)		Grant's Foodmart
Mississauga - Applewood Village Plaza (North Service Road & Stanfield)	Dominion, then Metro (closed in January 2014 and demolished)	Has become a Longo's Supermarket
Mississauga - Iona Square (Mississauga Valley Blvd)	Dominion	Metro
Niagara Falls Victoria Avenue	Later as Hy & Zels and then Pharmacy 1 (other retail)	Shoppers Drug Mart (pharmacy) - after collapse of Pharmacy 1
North York - Store 269, Willowdale Plaza, Yonge Street and Sheppard Avenue East	converted to Dominion, then Metro	Closed in January 2010 and demolished and replaced Hullmark Centre condos (residential) with three-floor retail podium which includes a Whole Foods Market
North York - Sheppard Plaza, Bathurst Street and Sheppard Avenue West	converted to Dominion	Metro
North York - Newtonbrook Plaza, Yonge and Cummer	converted to Food Basics (Metro Inc.)	Closed in January 2019 and demolished. To be replaced with condo development.
North York - Bathurst St. and Cedarcroft Blvd.
North York - Store 236, Victoria Park Avenue and Sheppard Avenue East		Food Basics (Metro Inc.)
North York - Finchdale Plaza	Converted to Galati Brothers then as Asian supermarket Oriental Food Mart	Centra Food Market
North York - 1090 Wilson Avenue	Became Dominion	Metro
Oakville - Upper Oakville Plaza	converted to an Ultra Food & Drug, then Dominion	Metro
Oakville - Kerr Street and Speers Road		Food Basics (Metro Inc.)
Oshawa - Rossland Square, Rossland and Wilson	converted to A&P, then Metro. Closed in August 2019.	Food Basics
Orillia - Front and Coldwater	converted to A&P	Metro after sale of A&P Canada
Rexdale - John Garland Plaza	converted to Food Basics	Bestco (Asian supermarket)
Scarborough - Bamburgh Circle	converted to an Ultra Food & Drug and later as Bamburgh Food Mart	now Asian supermarket Foody Mart
Scarborough - Cedarbrae Mall	converted to Loblaws	now No Frills (Loblaws)
Scarborough - Scarborough Town Centre		Converted lower food court and various stores on upper floors
Scarborough - Alton Towers	later as Ultra Food & Drug and later as Asian supermarket food fair	Asian supermarket Al Premium
Scarborough - Store 275, Parkway Mall	converted to Dominion	Metro
Scarborough - Markham Corners	Ultra Food and Drug, Converted to Food Basics in ca. August 1999	Food Basics (Metro Inc.)
Scarborough - White Shield Plaza at Lawrence Avenue East at Kennedy Road	converted to Valdi	Asian supermarket Lake Tai
Scarborough - Kennedy Park Plaza		Giant Tiger (Other retail)
Simcoe	converted into A&P	continued to use the "Miracle Food Mart" name until the mid 1990s creating 2 A&P stores in town, now Food Basics (Metro Inc.)
St. Catharines - The Pen Centre	converted to Dominion and closed after 4 years	Zehrs Markets (Loblaws)
Sudbury - Notre Dame Avenue	Converted to A&P	Food Basics (Metro Inc.)
Sudbury - LaSalle Boulevard	Converted to A&P	Food Basics (Metro Inc.)
Sudbury - Southridge Mall	converted to A&P, then Metro. Closed in January 2015.	Giant Tiger
Thornhill - Bathurst Street and Steeles Avenue West	Later as Food Basics (Metro Inc.)	FreshCo (Sobeys)
Toronto - Jane Park Plaza		Food Basics (Metro Inc.)
Toronto - Gerrard Square at Pape Avenue & Gerrard Street East		Food Basics (Metro Inc.)
Toronto (East York) - Thorncliffe Shopping Centre	converted to Dominion	Food Basics (Metro Inc.)
Toronto Bathurst and Viewmount	converted to Dominion	Purchased by adjacent school - Bialik Hebrew Day School which subsequently expanded its campus (educational)
Welland - Seaway Mall		Converted to a new wing of the mall, which currently includes Dollarama, Bulk Barn and several other stores and services (other retail)
Whitby - Dundas & Frances	Converted first to A&P, then Food Basics	Giant Tiger (Other retail)
Whitby - Whitby Mall	Closed in 1996	Office Depot (Other retail)
Windsor - Devonshire Mall	converted to A&P	Chapters/Indigo (bookstore)
Windsor - University Plaza	converted to A&P, then Metro	Closed in Sept 2016. Now a Food Basics.

== See also ==
- List of supermarket chains in Canada
- Miracle Mart
