= Ultra Food & Drug =

Supermarket and drug store chain in Ontario, Canada

- Type: Division
- Industry: Supermarket
- Founded: Ontario, 1989
- Defunct: 2008
- Headquarters: Ontario, Canada
- Products: Master Choice products; Dairy, frozen foods, grocery, general merchandise (non-food), meat/deli, pharmacy, produce, snacks
- Parent: Metro Inc.
- Website: www.metro.ca

Ultra Food & Drug was a supermarket and drug store chain in Ontario, Canada from the 1980s to 2008.

It was begun in the 1980s as Miracle Ultra Mart, and was an attempt by the Miracle Mart department store and Miracle Food Mart supermarket chains to expand. Both chains were owned by Steinberg's Stores, a Quebec-based supermarket chain.

When Steinberg's Ontario grocery operations were acquired by A&P Canada in 1990, the Miracle Food Mart stores continued to operate under their former banner until eventually being converted to A&P Canada's "A&P" and "Dominion" banners. A&P Canada continued the Miracle Ultra Mart banner as Ultra Mart, before changing its name to Ultra Food & Drug in the mid-1990s. The Miracle Mart department stores (rebranded "M" by the time) were not included in this transaction, and remained part of Steinburg until they were closed when the company went bankrupt in 1992.

Ultra Food & Drug returned to ownership by a Quebec company in 2006 when A&P Canada was acquired by Metro Inc. Up and until this date, A&P Canada had left the Ultra Food & Drug banner alone. It was well noted in the communities of the Ultra stores that A&P owned and operated the Ultra stores. Many customers who had grown up in the Toronto area were familiar with and happy to shop at Dominion stores. The relationship between the A&P, Dominion and Ultra banners remained strong and customers came to expect the same experience when visiting any of the three banners. Many customers who would travel to other areas of Ontario from Toronto would notice the similar design and branding as the Dominion stores. The Ultra banners were primarily found outside of the GTA, specifically in Guelph, Oakville/Burlington, Brampton (Bramalea), as well as some eastern Ontario cities such as Belleville, Ontario. The Ultra banner store sales were a significant portion of A&P Canada's revenues, and the stores seemed to "survive on their own," with little management.

Although many of the Ultra stores had "above average store sales," some of the Ultra stores were known to outperform many of the A&P and Dominion stores, primarily the Ultra Food&Drug store located at Stone Road and Edinburgh in Guelph. The Guelph Ultra store was known by many at A&P's head office as being a market leader. The Guelph store had fierce competition from Zehrs Markets, a division of Loblaws, Inc. The Ultra store opened in Guelph on February 13, 1997 and maintained a healthy market share, primarily because of the noticeable customer service over their competitors. Guelph's store employed a number of high school and University of Guelph students that took on customer service head-on under the leadership of the store management. Many of these students were allotted power and authorization not seen in any of A&P's other stores. This focus on customer service was initially seen as critical in order to make the store successful. While customer service was critical to the success of the Guelph store, the store was also well known for being open 24 hours a day, 7 days a week - something no other grocer in the city of Guelph offered. The Guelph store was also seen regularly participating in local community events such as the Santa Claus Parade, Guelph's July 1 celebrations at Riverside Park, Heart and Strokes Big Bike event (a bicycle built for 30 people) as well as 365 days a year bin drop off for the Guelph Food Bank.

On August 7, 2008, Metro announced it will invest $200 million consolidating the company's conventional food stores under the Metro banner. Over a period of 15 months, all Dominion, A&P, Loeb, the Barn and Ultra banners were converted to be Metro; the Food Basics brand was retained in the discount food segment. The final three Ultra Food and Drug locations were converted by November 14, 2008.

== See also ==
- List of Canadian supermarkets
