= Devonshire Mall =

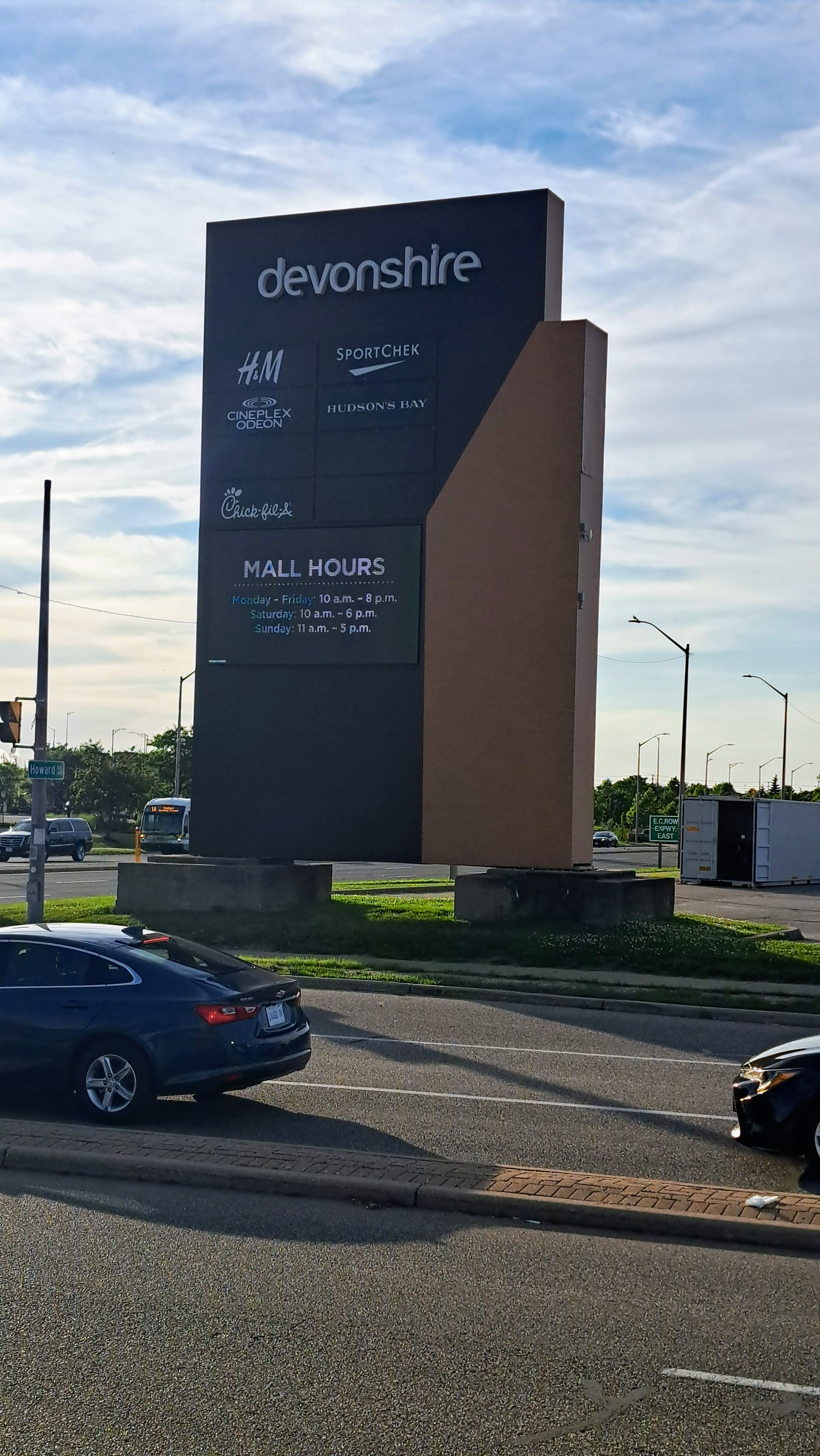
- Howard Avenue entrance in 2024
- Coordinates: 42.275°N 83.002°W
- Address: 3100 Howard Avenue; Windsor, Ontario, Canada, N8X 3Y8
- Opened: 1970
- Developer: Windsor developer Cambridge Leaseholds Ltd
- Manager: Primaris REIT
- Owner: Primaris REIT
- Num. of stores: 158
- Num. of anchor tenants: 8
- Floor area: 678,470 square feet (63,032 m^{2})
- Floors: 1
- Website: devonshiremall.com

Devonshire Mall is a shopping mall in Windsor, Ontario, Canada. Devonshire opened with 497,200 square feet (46,190 m^{2}) of space anchored by Simpson-Sears on the north and Miracle Mart with an adjacent Miracle Food Mart at the south. It was constructed at a cost of $15,000,000 by Windsor developer Cambridge Leaseholds Ltd. The Simpson-Sears store was among the largest in the chain at 286,000 square feet (26,600 m^{2}). The center also contained branches of the major financial institutions, an auditorium which was available to community groups and a dual screen cinema operated by Famous Players.

The mall has been expanded several times since its opening. The first expansion occurred in 1974 on the mall's east side. The addition encompassed 250,000 square feet (23,000 m^{2}) and included space for Simpson's and Smith's (also known as Smith's of Windsor). In 1975 Marks & Spencer purchased Smith's and eliminated the nameplate. Other expansions occurred in 1985, adding stores and a food court; 1995, which added a southeast entrance by reducing the size of the Miracle Mart building leaving the remainder for a Zeller's which operated until 2012; 1999-2002, which added a 12 screen cinema and space for 15 stores; 2008, and 2018. At 160 stores, it is the largest mall in Windsor.

In 2015, Ivanhoé Cambridge sold its 50 percent stake in the mall to Healthcare Of Ontario Pension Plan (HOOPP), which already owned the other 50 percent of the property. The following year, HOOPP announced a major renovation to the mall which included new tenants and an expanded food court. The work was expected to take two-years and cost approximately $70 million. As part of this renovation, Target opened in the former Zeller's space which had been vacant.

In 2021, the shuttered Sears store at Devonshire became home of a mass COVID-19 vaccination site as part of a cooperative effort between Windsor Regional Hospital, the City of Windsor and the Windsor-Essex County Health Unit.

In 2022, HOOPP sold the property to H&R REIT and it is currently operated by Primaris REIT. In spring 2024, mall management announced another redevelopment plan which included demolishing the former Sears building which had been mostly vacant since the store closed in 2018. In summer 2024, management announced that they would construct a new entry at the Sears site that will include new facilities for Sport Chek and Mark's which would relocate from other areas of the mall. Primaris is reviewing other plans for the space which it says may include hotels, residences or entertainment venues.

In July 2024, the Hudson's Bay store closed for approximately one week due to a failure of the air conditioning system. The store was one of many the chain closed that week citing mechanical issues. In March 2025, the chain announced it was liquidating its locations. Sales at the Devonshire store began in late March. In July 2026, Primaris acquired the former Hudson's Bay site and announced it would demolish the structure to create a new entrance for the mall.

== See also ==
- Canada's largest shopping malls
