= Brampton Mall =

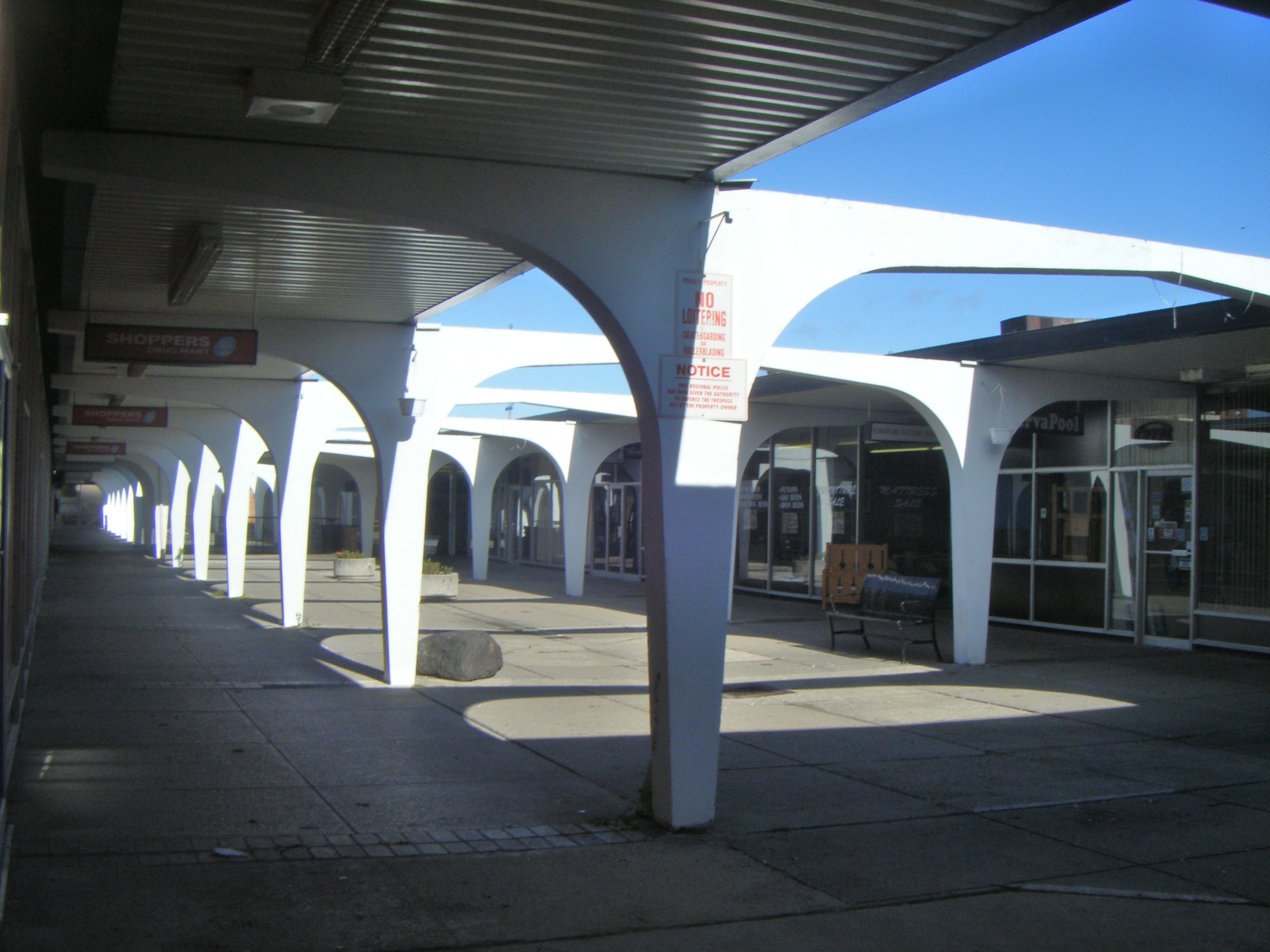
- The interior pathway of the Brampton Mall
- Location: Brampton, Ontario, Canada
- Coordinates: 43.6782°N 79.7475°W
- Opened: 1960
- Manager: Goldmanco Incorporated
- Num. of anchor tenants: 2
- Floors: 2, one open
- Website: Archive of official website

Brampton Mall is a shopping mall in Brampton, Ontario, Canada. Typical of early North American malls, the Brampton Mall is an outdoor plaza with two rows of stores, connected by a "covered breezeway".

== History of the mall ==
Initially, Brampton Mall planned to stay open Mondays, against Brampton's closing hours by-law, announcing their intentions the morning of November 15, 1960. Also that day, the retail merchants committee of the Brampton Chamber of Commerce met November 15 with Brampton Shopping Centre officials regarding the "delicate subject" of business hours for retail in town. Officials from the mall wanted to arrange a meeting of all merchants after Christmas, both in the downtown and in the mall, to determine store shopping hours. Patrick McQuade, the mall's director of operations, later told the press that they indeed would observe Monday and evening closing hours, stating "We feel by-law amendments might be studied toward the end of the year."

The 34 store plaza was anchored by Steinberg's, who simultaneously opened stores at Newtonbrook Plaza, Yonge Street and Cummer Avenue, and Cedarbrae Plaza, at Lawrence Avenue and Markham Road, adding to two previous GTA locations. (By 1962, the store was simply "Steinberg", singular.)

Five stores were gutted in a fire in 1963; being a Monday, the mall was closed at the time, and no one injured. The fire caused damage to eleven other units in the mall, a variety of stores and offices. Starting in a drapery and fabric store, it spread to a photography studio, brides' shop, cleaners, and a dress and fur store. It caused $250,000 in damages. Firefighters had the flames under control within an hour, fighting "to the accompaniment of hi-fi music over the mall loudspeakers." Half of the 26 lanes in the mall's bowling alley were water damaged. The Toronto Star suggested the centre of the mall was "turned... into a miniature lake," which "dozens of children romped on bicycles through the water."

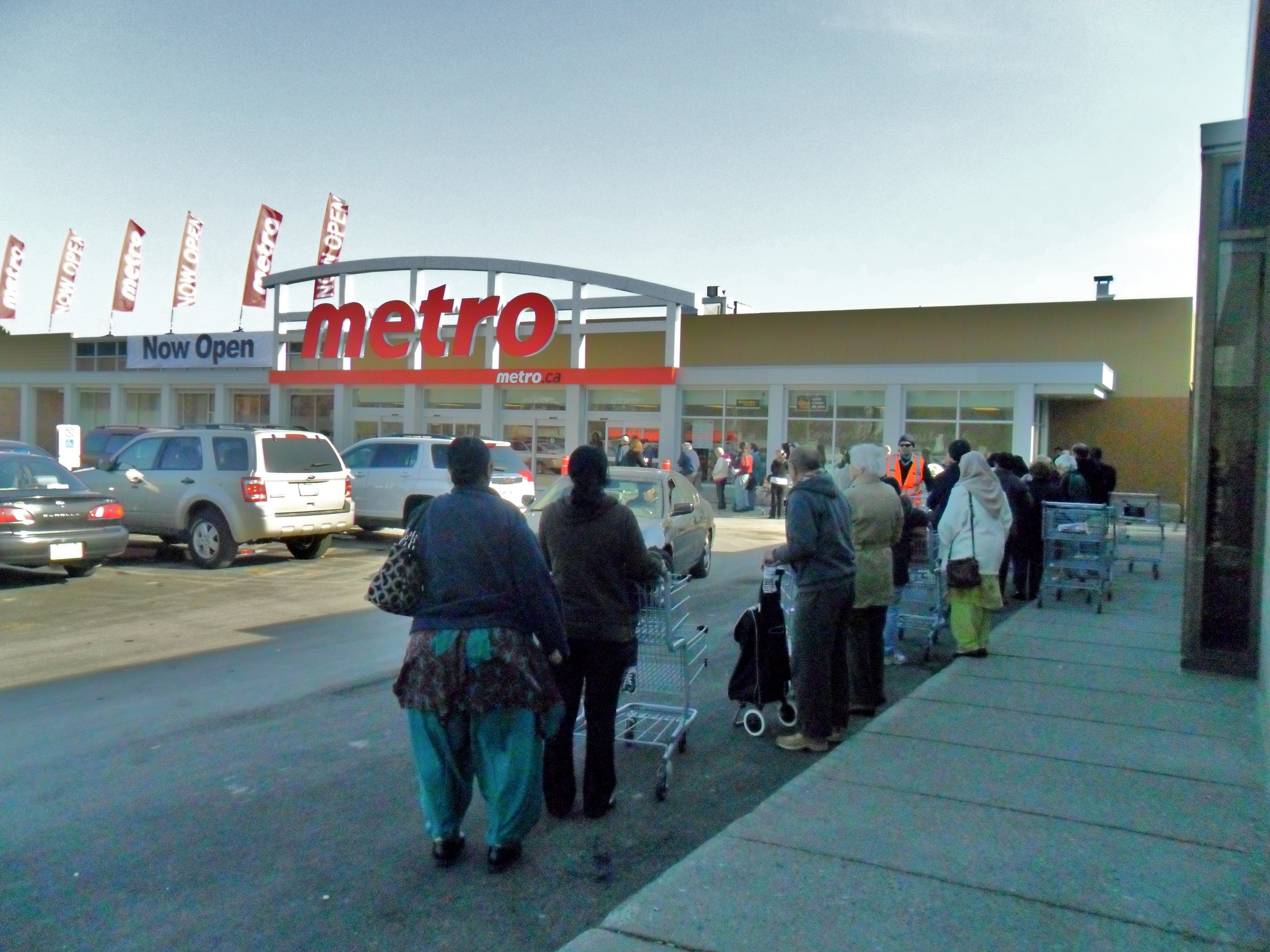
Reopening of the Metro store, 2012, created significant lineups to enter the store.

In 1970, a committee of the Town of Brampton's council approved relocating Meadowland Gate, 100 feet east of its present location, to allow for the expansion of the Brampton Mall. The move allowed the plaza the opportunity to add four acres and 59,000 square feet of new commercial space.

By 1974, the anchor grocery unit had changed to Miracle Food Mart, whose other locations included Bramalea City Centre.

As of 1976, there was an outlet of the Peel Region Health Unit at the mall. Lease agreements continued until at least 1982, but this may exclusively been on behalf of the Peel Children's Aid Society.

In 1983, a purse-snatcher, a homeless man known to locals only as John the Baptist, dragged a senior several yards in an attempt to steal her purse, and in 1995, an armed robbery took place at the Bargain Shop.

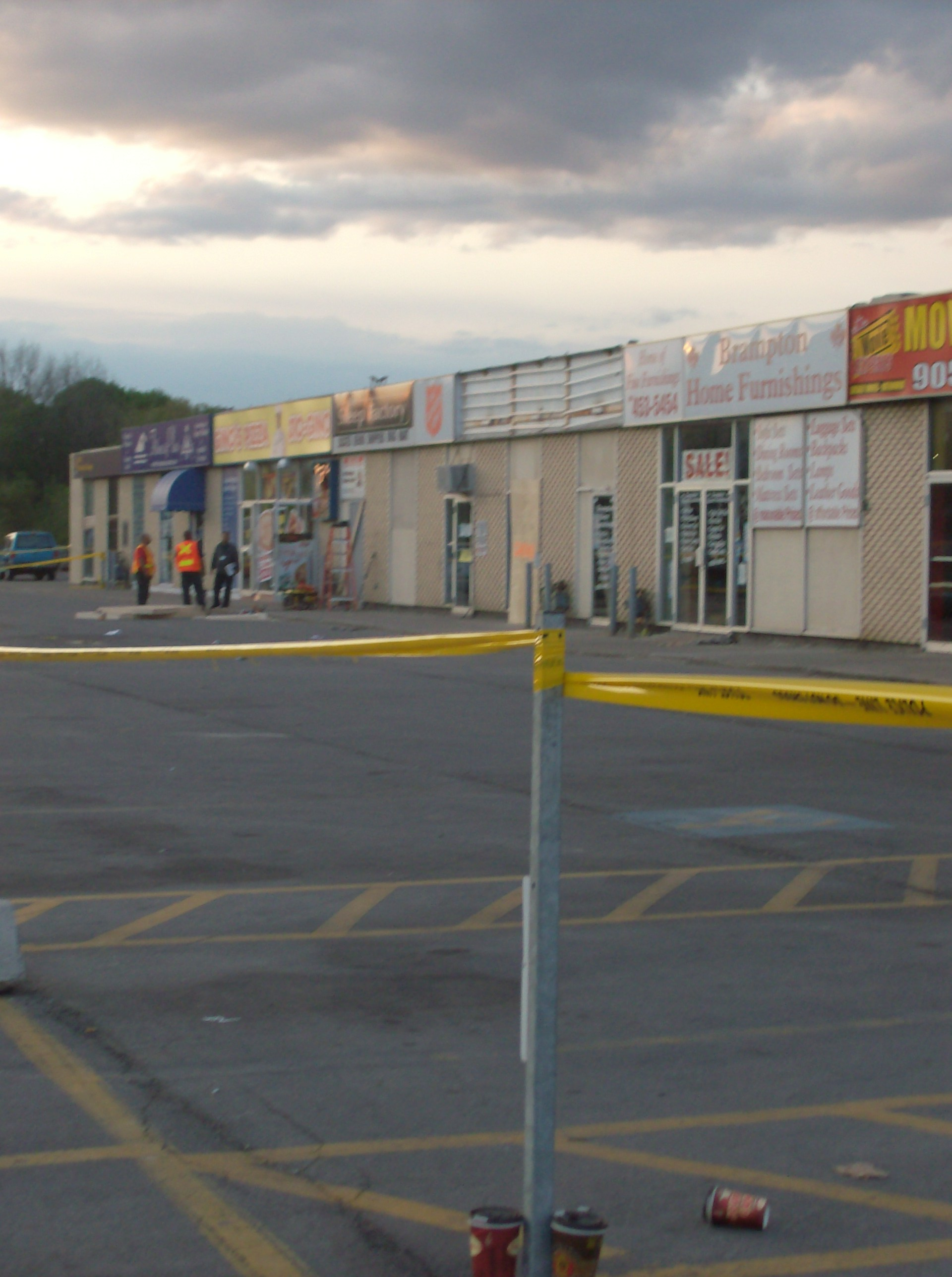
The Brampton Mall, closed for investigation after a major fire in 2008

On May 15, 2008, in the early evening, three youths broke into the vacant bowling alley unit at the mall. They started a fire, which led to police and fire evacuated the mall. An investigation was scheduled for two to three days while engineers and city officials looked at the structural damage. The fire created $1 million worth of damage, particularly to Movie Experts, Shoppers Drug Mart and Brampton Home Furnishing. Eight stores were affected, and an underground delivery corridor's concrete ceiling dropped 6 to 8 inches. Firefighters had to search a "maze of corridors" in the basement, to ensure no one remained in the building. One of the youths involved was 17-year-old Richard Sloppick who was subsequently charged with arson. Power was turned off to all units except A&P and Coffee Time, and shut down traffic on Main Street. Shoppers Drug Mart set up a temporary facility for prescriptions during the closure.

Due to changes in the Old Age Security plan, members of the Ontario Federation of Labour occupied Conservative MP Kyle Seeback's constituency office at Brampton Mall, in 2012.

The mall is part of the Hurontario-Main Corridor Secondary Plan.

== See also ==
- Shoppers World Brampton, opened in 1969, further south on Main Street South
