= Promenades Saint-Bruno =

Shopping mall in the Montreal area

Promenades St-Bruno
- Coordinates: 45.5053°N 73.3785°W
- Address: 1 Blvd des Promenades; Saint-Bruno-de-Montarville, Quebec; J3V 5J5
- Opened: August 23, 1978; 48 years ago
- Previous names: CF Promenades St-Bruno (2015–2025)
- Developer: Cadillac Fairview Corporation
- Manager: Primaris REIT
- Owner: Primaris REIT
- Num. of stores: 250
- Num. of anchor tenants: 4
- Floor area: 1,001,197 sq ft (93,014.2 m^{2}) (GLA)
- Floors: 2
- Parking: Outdoor
- Public transit: Réseau de transport de Longueuil 8, 60, 98, 99, 192; Exo Vallée du Richelieu 200
- Website: www.lespromenadesstbruno.ca

Promenades St-Bruno is a two-level shopping mall located in Saint-Bruno-de-Montarville, Quebec, Canada. It has been the largest mall in the Montérégie ever since its opening in 1978 and was expanded in 1991. Part of its consumer base comes from cities as far as Saint-Hyacinthe and Sorel-Tracy. From 2015 to 2025, it was branded as CF Promenades St-Bruno by previous operator Cadillac Fairview.

The anchor tenants are Simons, Winners, Sports Experts and Avril Supermarché Santé. A public market named Marché des Promenades houses many independent shops. Outside of the shopping mall itself, there is a high presence of big-box stores, restaurants and category killers, some of which are actual tenants of Promenades Saint-Bruno.

== History ==
A Steinberg's supermarket was there between 1978 and 1992, around 50,000 sq ft (4,600 m^{2}). Steinberg's, through Ivanhoe, had owned 25% of the mall and also operated a Miracle Mart store side by side to the supermarket. The latter was renamed to M in August 1986. Both businesses closed in 1992. It was announced that Zellers would open by November 1993 in the space formerly used by Steinberg's and the M store. Zellers left the mall in 2012 and retailer Target occupied its space from 2013 to 2015. After five years of unoccupancy, the former Target location got transformed into a 130,000 sq ft (12,000 m^{2}) public market named "CF Marché des Promenades" consisting of 40 tenants including a Avril Supermarché Santé grocery store of 35,000 sq ft (3,300 m^{2}).

Hudson's Bay Company closed its Simpsons location at Promenades St-Bruno in early 1989. The existing The Bay store relocated in Simpsons' vacant space on June 22, 1989. The Bay's original location stayed empty for over a year. A new mall wing was then created with 57 shops which opened during the spring of 1991 anchored by a Sears store that inaugurated on April 3. This increased the size of the mall to nearly 200,000 square feet (19,000 m^{2}).

Sears closed on January 14, 2018. The space that Sears occupied was dismantled to welcome a relocating Sports Experts, Winners and Imaginaire. On May 1, 2019, Sports Experts/Atmosphere left its previous location above Simons to relocate on the second floor of the former Sears store. Winners opened on September 10, 2019, in the first floor of Sears. Imaginaire, a retail chain from Quebec City, opened its first Greater Montreal location during the fall of 2019, using 15,000 sq ft (1,400 m^{2}) of the former Sears.

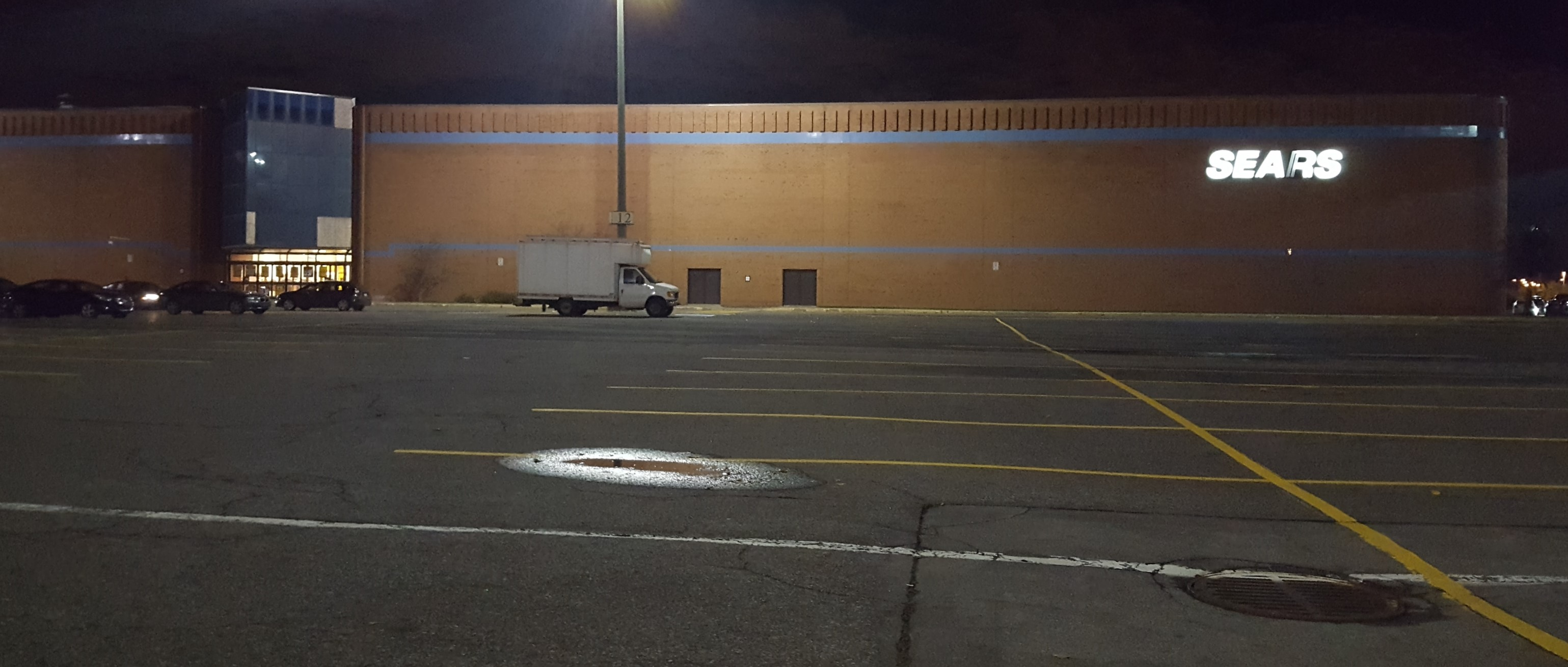
Former Sears store from 1991 to 2018 (now the site of Winners, Sports Experts and Imaginaire).

During the 1990s, big box stores arrived around the mall, which continued well into the 2000s. While some of these stores (e.g., Best Buy, Old Navy) are tenants of Promenades St-Bruno, the majority of them have no relation with it.

Simons picked the first floor of former Eaton's in 2001. Sport Experts/Atmosphere and five boutiques took over the second floor of Eaton's. Simons doubled its size in 2021 by expanding on the second floor formerly occupied by Sports Experts. Despite Simons having only one floor during its first 20 years at Promenades Saint-Bruno, the exterior of the location has always been two-story high since the store's inception because it was originally designed with the idea that it could potentially expand.

An anchor of Promenades St-Bruno dating from its debut in 1978, Hudson's Bay closed in 2025.

The original major tenants were Eaton's (130,000 sq ft), Simpsons (135,000 sq ft), The Bay (125,000 sq ft), Miracle Mart, (130,000 sq ft) and Steinberg's (50,000 sq ft). Les Promenades St-Bruno was the first shopping centre in Canada to house at the same time the three upscale department stores: Simpsons, The Bay and Eaton's. At 900,000 sq ft (84,000 m^{2}) upon inauguration, it was the second largest mall among all of Cadillac Fairview's properties across the country in 1978, surpassed at the time only by fellow Quebec shopping centre Galeries d'Anjou. Concomitantly, Les Promenades Saint-Bruno was the second largest mall among all shopping centres in the Montreal area after Galeries d'Anjou. In Quebec as a whole, Promenades St-Bruno was the third largest shopping mall behind Place Laurier and Galeries d'Anjou in terms of rentable space, and its number of stores was higher than Anjou's. Promenades Saint-Bruno was originally the joint property at 51% of Cadillac Fairview, 24.5% of Ivanhoe Corporation and 24.5% of Eaton's. The mall was developed by Cadillac Fairview at $45 million and opened on August 23, 1978, with 170 stores. Its history dates back to 1968 when Steinberg's Ivanhoe Corporation purchased the 200 acres site at the corner of Autoroute 30 and Route 116 in St-Bruno. Eaton's became co-owner in the early 1970s and Fairview Corporation (a predecessor of Cadillac Fairview) followed suit in 1973. In October 2025, Primaris acquired Promenades St-Bruno from Cadillac Fairview for $565 million.

A deadly mid-air collision occurred above the Promenades St-Bruno on March 17, 2017, with the wreckage of one of the planes landing on the roof of the mall and the other on its parking lot.

== See also ==
- List of largest enclosed shopping malls in Canada
- List of malls in Montreal
- List of shopping malls in Canada
