= Brunet (pharmacy) =

- Company type: Subsidiary
- Industry: Retail Pharmacy
- Founded: 1855, Quebec City, Quebec
- Headquarters: 12225, boulevard Industriel; Montreal, Quebec; H1B 5M7
- Products: pharmacaceutical products
- Parent: Metro Inc. (1987–present)
- Website: brunet.ca

Brunet is a group of pharmacists in Quebec, Canada.

== History ==
Brunet's slogan, "En santé depuis 150 ans", is a double meaning ("Healthy for 150 years" / "In the healthcare business for 150 years") and it is representative of the group's longevity. Wilfrid-Étienne Brunet founded the first Brunet pharmacy in 1855 in Saint-Roch, Quebec City, the largest one at the time. Between then and 1982, four more pharmacies were opened in the city.

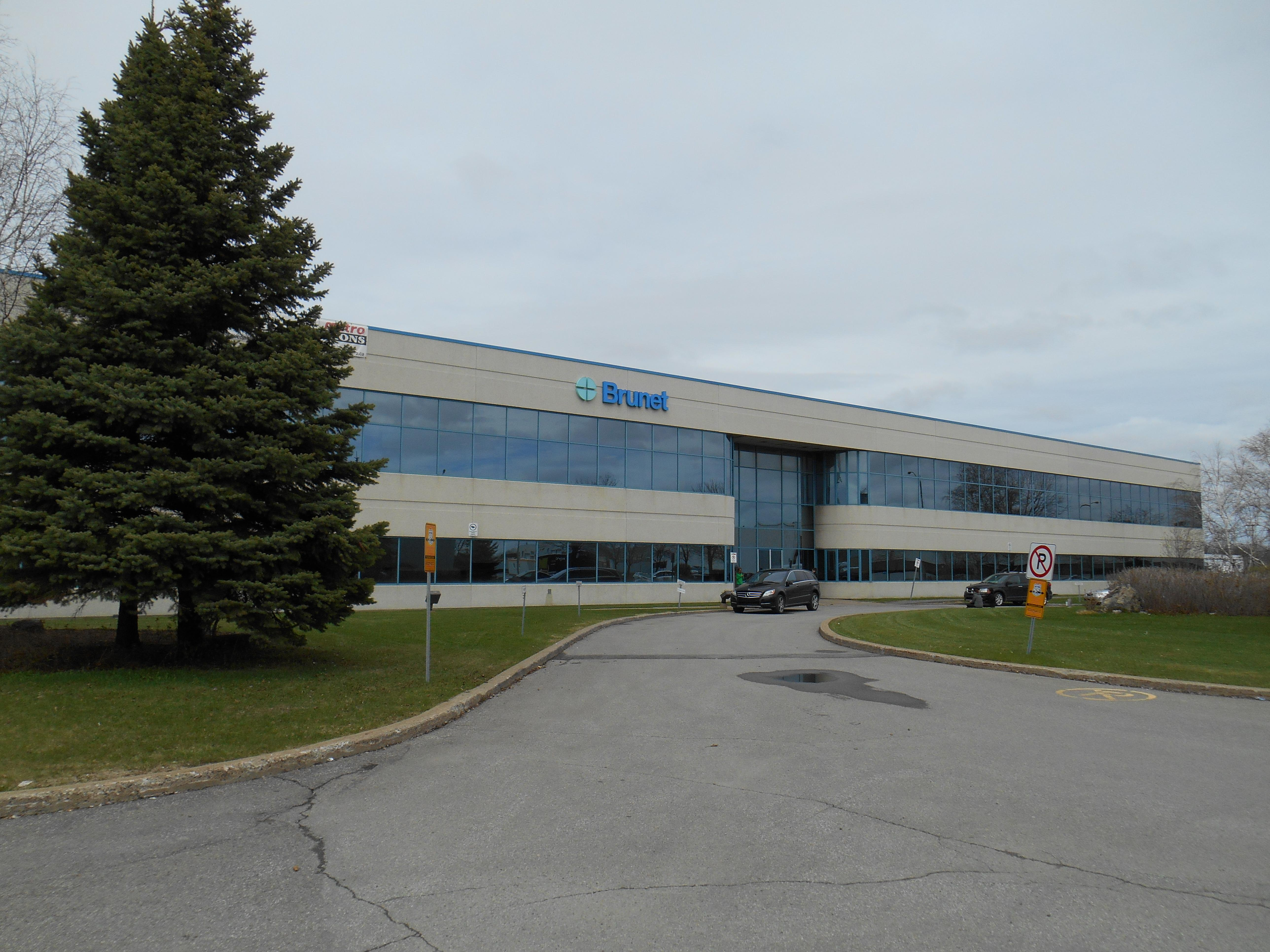
12225 Industriel Boulevard, in the borough of Rivière-des-Prairies–Pointe-aux-Trembles

In 1987, McMahon Distributeur pharmaceutique inc., a subsidiary of Métro-Richelieu (now Metro Inc.), bought Brunet. The group later expanded to most of the province of Quebec and now includes 182 branches.

In 1997, McMahon created the Clini Plus banner, featuring 72 small-size branches.

In 2009, Brunet opened Brunet Plus with a total area of 7000 square feet, now numbering 22. They were well accepted by the local population.

In 2010, Brunet opened Brunet Clinique which also had much success.

In January 2011, Brunet created MaSanté, the first tool of its kind to help the patient and their families to better take care of their health issues.

== Advertising ==
Brunet is known for its bold TV advertising in which people go through tough but humorous material losses—such as accidentally burning a winning lottery ticket or realizing the mattress full of cash was discarded—only to conclude with the line: "Vous avez la santé. C'est tout ce qui compte." ("You're healthy. that's all that matters.")
