= Wilfrid-Étienne Brunet =

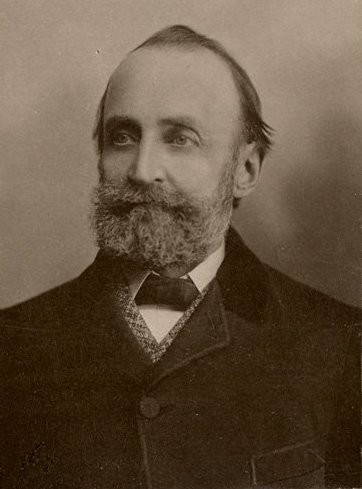
- Born: October 21, 1832; Quebec City, Lower Canada
- Died: March 7, 1899 (aged 66); Quebec City, Quebec
- Known for: pharmacist

Wilfrid-Étienne Brunet (October 21, 1832 – March 7, 1899) was a Canadian pharmacist and the founder of the company Brunet.

Born in Quebec City, Lower Canada, the son of Jean-Olivier Brunet and Cécile-Adélaide Lagueux, Brunet studied at the Petit Séminaire de Québec from 1841 to 1850. From 1850 to 1855, he studied chemistry and pharmacy with his brother-in-law who was a pharmacist, Pierre-O. Giroux. He established a shop in Quebec City in 1855. In 1858, he was granted a licence to practise as a chemist and chemist.

In 1876, he became a Quebec City Councillor for the Saint-Roch ward.
