= Carrefour Laval =

Shopping mall in Quebec, Canada

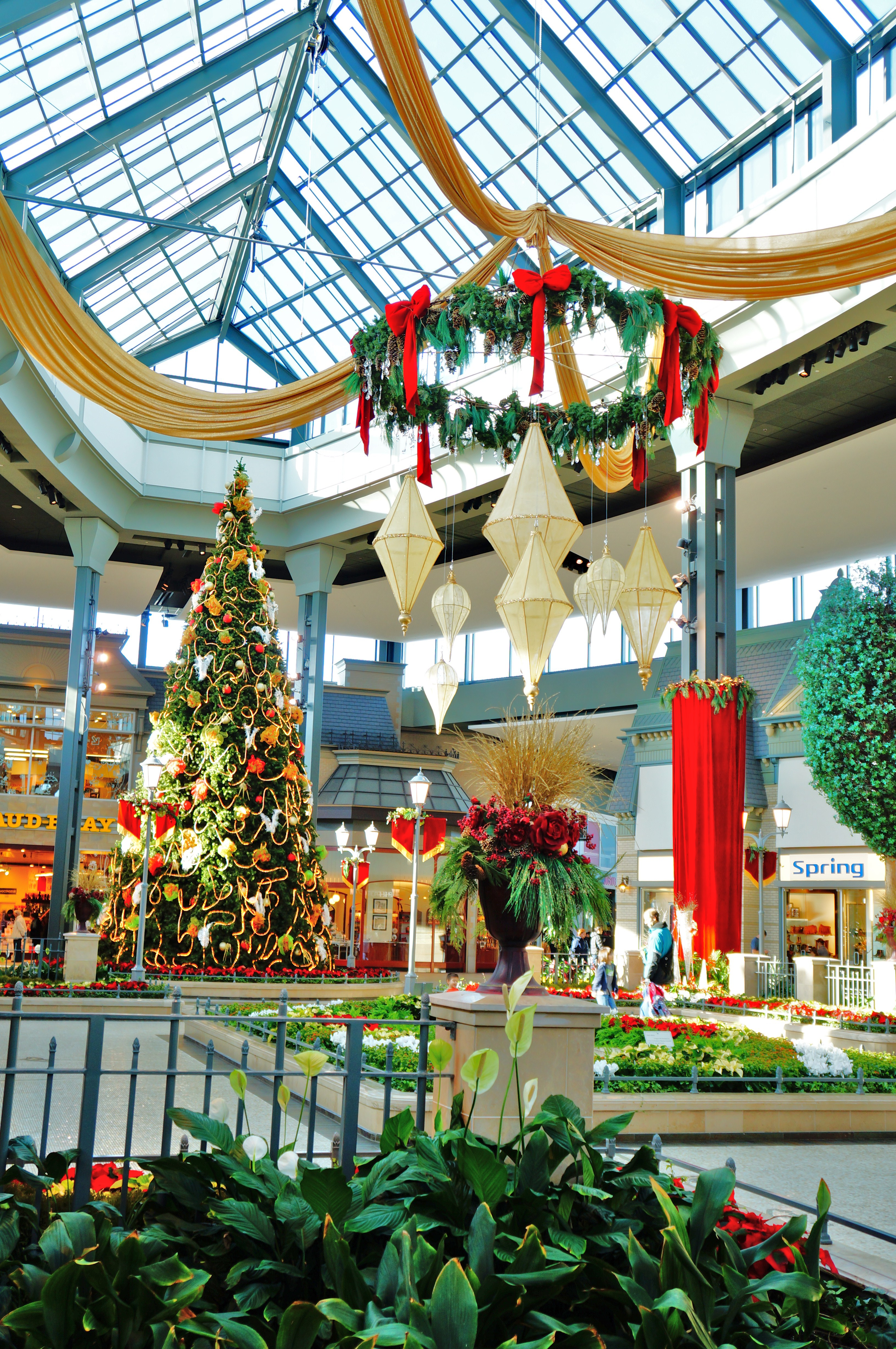
- Carrefour Laval in 2012
- Coordinates: 45.57°N 73.751°W
- Address: 3003, boulevard le Carrefour; Laval, Quebec, Canada; H7T 1C7
- Opened: March 28, 1974
- Developer: Fairview Corporation
- Manager: Cadillac Fairview Corp.
- Owner: Cadillac Fairview Corp.
- Num. of stores: 300+
- Num. of anchor tenants: 2
- Floor area: 115,478 m^{2} or 1,242,990 sq ft (GLA)
- Floors: 1
- Public transit: Terminus Le Carrefour; Société de transport de Laval; Exo bus services; Montmorency
- Website: carrefourlaval.ca

Carrefour Laval (corporately styled as "CF Carrefour Laval") is a superregional shopping mall in Laval, Quebec, Canada. It is located in the Chomedey neighbourhood of the city at the intersection of Laurentian Autoroute (A-15) and Autoroute Jean-Noël-Lavoie (A-440).

At 115,478 m^{2} or 1,242,990 sq ft, it is both the largest enclosed shopping centre in the Greater Montreal area and the largest mall operating on a single floor in all of Quebec. Virtually untouched by the ongoing decline of indoor malls, it typically ranks among the top shopping centres in Quebec for its number of visitors as well as sales per 1 sq ft (0.093 m^{2}) and has been home to many retail firsts in the province.

== Stores ==
The mall has two anchor stores: Simons and Rona. Various other stores, boutiques and restaurants are represented in the mall.

== History ==
=== Planning for a new mall (1969-1973) ===
Construction of the mall was announced on February 27, 1969, by Steinberg's and Eaton's. The consortium announced that a 150-store mall would be built on a 20,000,000 sq ft (1,900,000 m^{2}) property next to the Laurentian Autoroute, subject to the construction of the necessary infrastructure by the newly formed city of Laval.

Construction was intended to start in 1971 but the project had been delayed after a zoning bylaw proposed by mayor Jacques Tétreault, that would effectively have given the Carrefour Laval consortium a monopoly over the development of the proposed downtown core of Laval, was challenged by the opposition and by members of his own party who founded his idea to be discriminatory and too restrictive towards other businesses. Carrefour Laval finally broke ground the following year and undertaken by Fairview Corporation which had previously developed the shopping malls Fairview Pointe-Claire and Galeries d'Anjou.

=== Timeline ===
- 1974: Carrefour Laval opens with major tenants Simpsons, Eaton's, Dupuis Frères, Pascal's and Beaucoup. (Note: Beaucoup Steinberg was a hypermarket that consisted of a Steinberg's supermarket, a Miracle Mart department store, a Le Quick restaurant and a Pik-Nik restaurant all under the same roof.) The L-shaped Carrefour Laval has 125 stores. Eaton's and Beaucoup anchor the ends of the mall and Simpsons is at the junction. Carrefour Laval has three owners: Fairview Corporation, Ivanhoe Corporation and Eaton's. It has a size of 850,000 sq ft (79,000 m^{2}) and occupies a land of 29.6 hectares. Almost 200,000 sq ft (19,000 m^{2}) of it goes to the Eaton's store.
- 1978: Dupuis Frères closes.
- 1983: The mall increases to 1,150,000 sq ft (107,000 m^{2}) by expanding to the west with 90 new stores and a Sears department store of 158,000 sq ft (14,700 m^{2}).
- 1984: The Beaucoup concept is abandoned. Steinberg's and Miracle Mart now have their separate anchor spaces, although they remain side by side.
- 1985: Miracle Mart is converted to M.
- 1989: Simpsons is converted to The Bay.
- 1991: Pascal's closes.
- 1992: Steinberg's and M close.
- 1993: Staples also becomes a tenant of Carrefour Laval. It is located in a portion of the former Pascal's hardware store's. Moreover, work begins to convert the space that had been occupied by M to accommodate what would have been the first Costco store in Quebec, but this is halted when Costco and Price Club merge the same year, since there was already a Price Club store right across the expressway.
- 1994: Rona opens on what used to be the anchor spaces of Steinberg's and M.
- 1995: Wise closes.
- 1996: Les Ailes de la Mode opens. Like Staples, it opens in the former Pascal outlet.
- 1999: Eaton's closes.
- 2000: Cadillac Fairview acquires full ownership of the mall. Until now it had been co-owned by Ivanhoe.
- 2002: Carrefour Laval expands with 80 new stores and anchor Simons. This expansion took place on the former spot of the Eaton's store which has been demolished. The new section is characterized on a map as the southern eastern portion of the mall with the shape of an arc.
- 2008: A newer, expanded food court and redesign of the flooring and ceilings is underway and scheduled to be completed in two phases by 2009. The food court offers now 1,200 seats.
- 2009: The new food court opens with 22 fast food restaurants, 1,200 seats and an upscale restaurant, Table 51. This results in a small increase of the total size of Carrefour Laval (attributed to the northern part of the new food court) although insignificant in comparison to the mall's expansions in 1983 and 2002. Conversion of the old 1983 food court into retail space begins.
- 2010: End of the work for the conversion of the old food court
- 2011: Les Ailes de la Mode closes.
- 2012: Crate & Barrel opens, in part of Les Ailes de la Mode's past location. The rest is split between The Keg and P.F. Chang's.
- 2014: Staples closes.
- 2018: Sears closes.
- 2019: TD Asset Management becomes owner of the mall at 50%.
- 2022: Sears' former building is demolished. Sporting Life opens in its former location at 26,827 sq ft (2,492.3 m^{2}).
- 2024: Cadillac Fairview buys back the half-interest in CF Carrefour Laval that it previously sold to partner TD Asset Management.
- 2025: Hudson's Bay closes.

== Transit accessibility ==
Non-local car traffic to the mall is mainly accessible via the two major highways that border it: Highway 15 and Highway 440. Additionally, it is served by public transit via the STL, which has its EXO bus terminal located across from the mall, with bus service that connects to the Montreal Metro (via the terminus of the orange line in Laval).

== See also ==
- List of largest enclosed shopping malls in Canada
- List of malls in Montreal
- List of shopping malls in Canada
