= Food Basics =

Canadian supermarket chain

Food Basics Ltd.
- Type: Supermarket
- Industry: Retail
- Founded: 1995; 31 years ago
- Headquarters: Toronto, Ontario, Canada
- Number of locations: 144
- Key people: Liam Bryant (president)
- Products: Food, general merchandise (non-food)
- Parent: A&P Canada (1995–2005); Metro Inc. (2005–present)
- Website: www.foodbasics.ca

Food Basics Ltd. is a Canadian supermarket chain owned by Metro Inc. The company operates over 144 stores throughout Ontario.

== History ==
Food Basics was created by A&P Canada to compete with the successful No Frills warehouse-style supermarket operated by Loblaw Companies. It became part of the Metro group when A&P Canada was sold to Metro for $1.7 billion in 2005.

Food Basics lowers its prices in a number of ways: low maintenance, store decor is kept to a minimum, and fewer staff are employed, mostly in part-time positions. The chain operates by pushing higher volumes on a limited selection of products than Metro stores, allowing it to compete price-wise with other grocery stores. There are over 144 stores across Canada. 36 were franchise stores until Metro Inc. purchased all stores back by the end of 2008.

Some Food Basics feature a pharmacy known as Food Basics Pharmacy.

Some locations are former Super Fresh or A&P supermarkets, dating from when both chains were operated by A&P, or other former banners such as A&P-owned Dominion or Metro-owned Super C.

In the past, the owners' names appeared on the banner (e.g., 'John/Jane's Food Basics'); however, all stores are now simply called 'Food Basics'. Concurrent with this change is a different slogan, which was changed from "Best Prices Everyday!!!" to "Always more for less!"

In Fall 2006, Metro Inc. began to renovate Food Basics stores. The design and format of these new stores closely resemble Metro's Super C banner in Quebec. New store signs feature broken lettering and a larger emphasis on yellow, green, and beige colours. In Spring 2007, Metro Inc. initiated their new inventory system into all of its warehouses.

== Labour relations ==
Food Basics is represented by the United Food and Commercial Workers union. Food Basics mostly offers part-time positions, and each store has few full-time positions. In 2015, overnight positions were discontinued by most stores because of budget reasons.

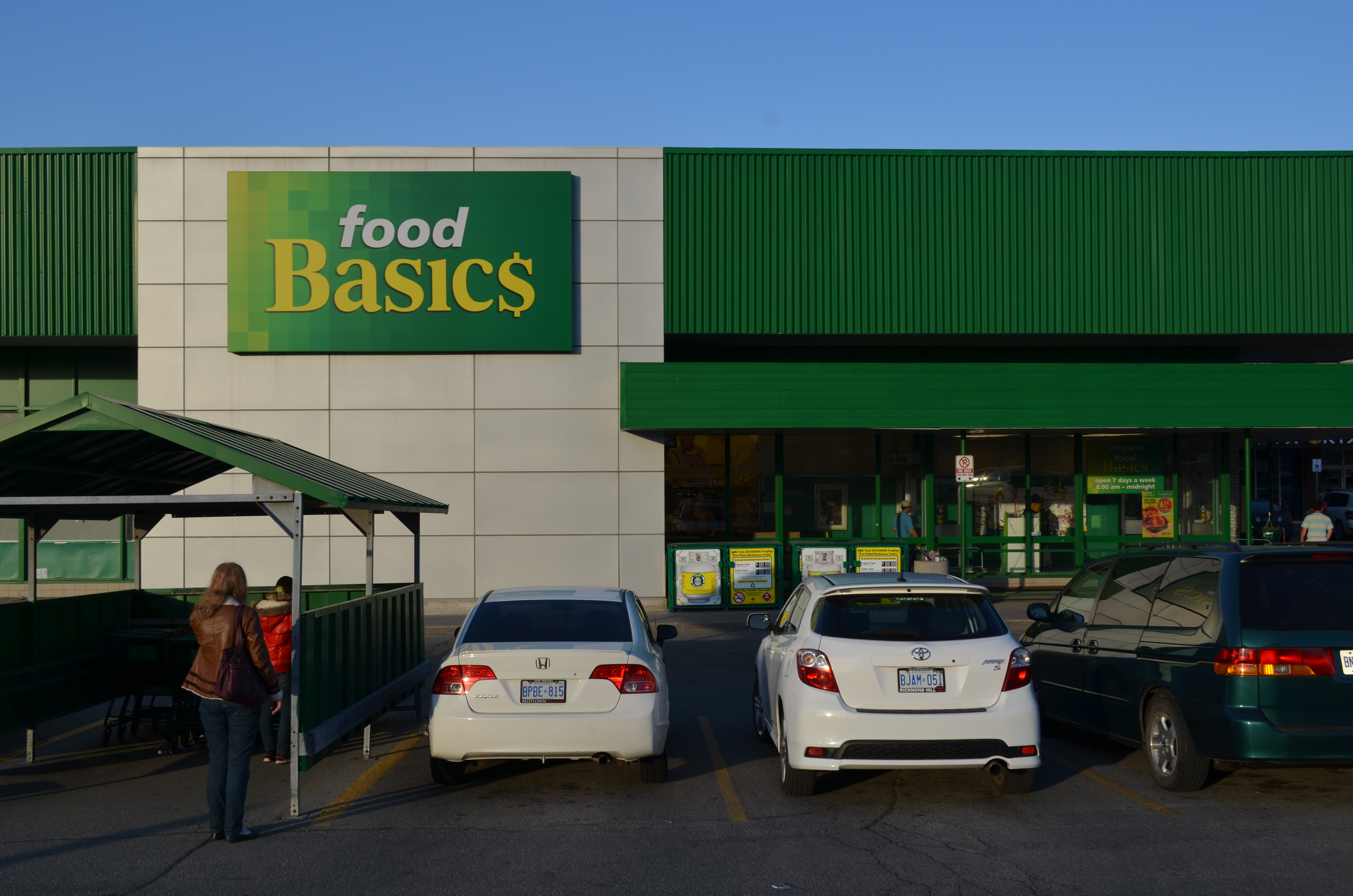
A Food Basics store in Toronto.

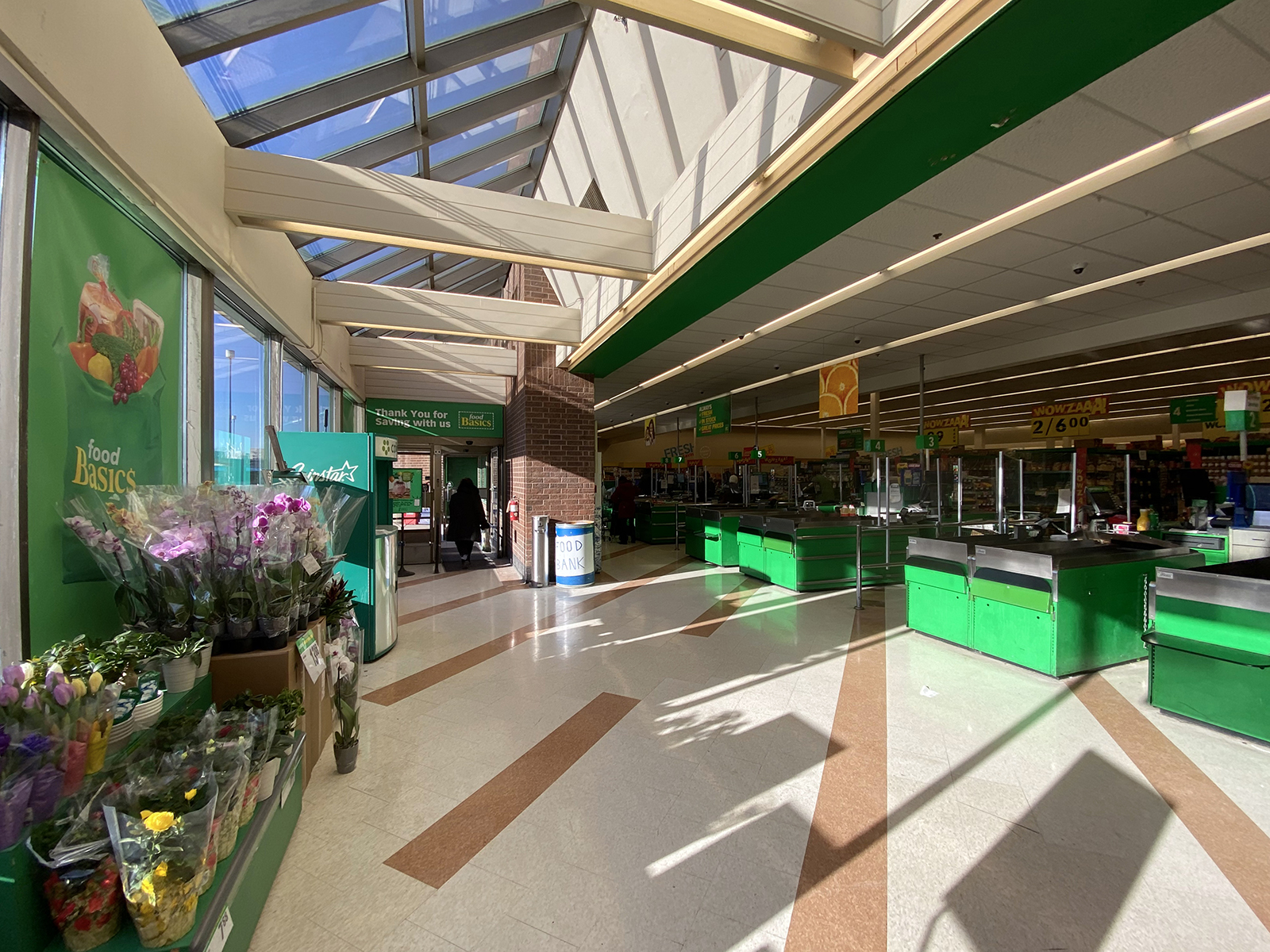
A Food Basics store in Brampton.

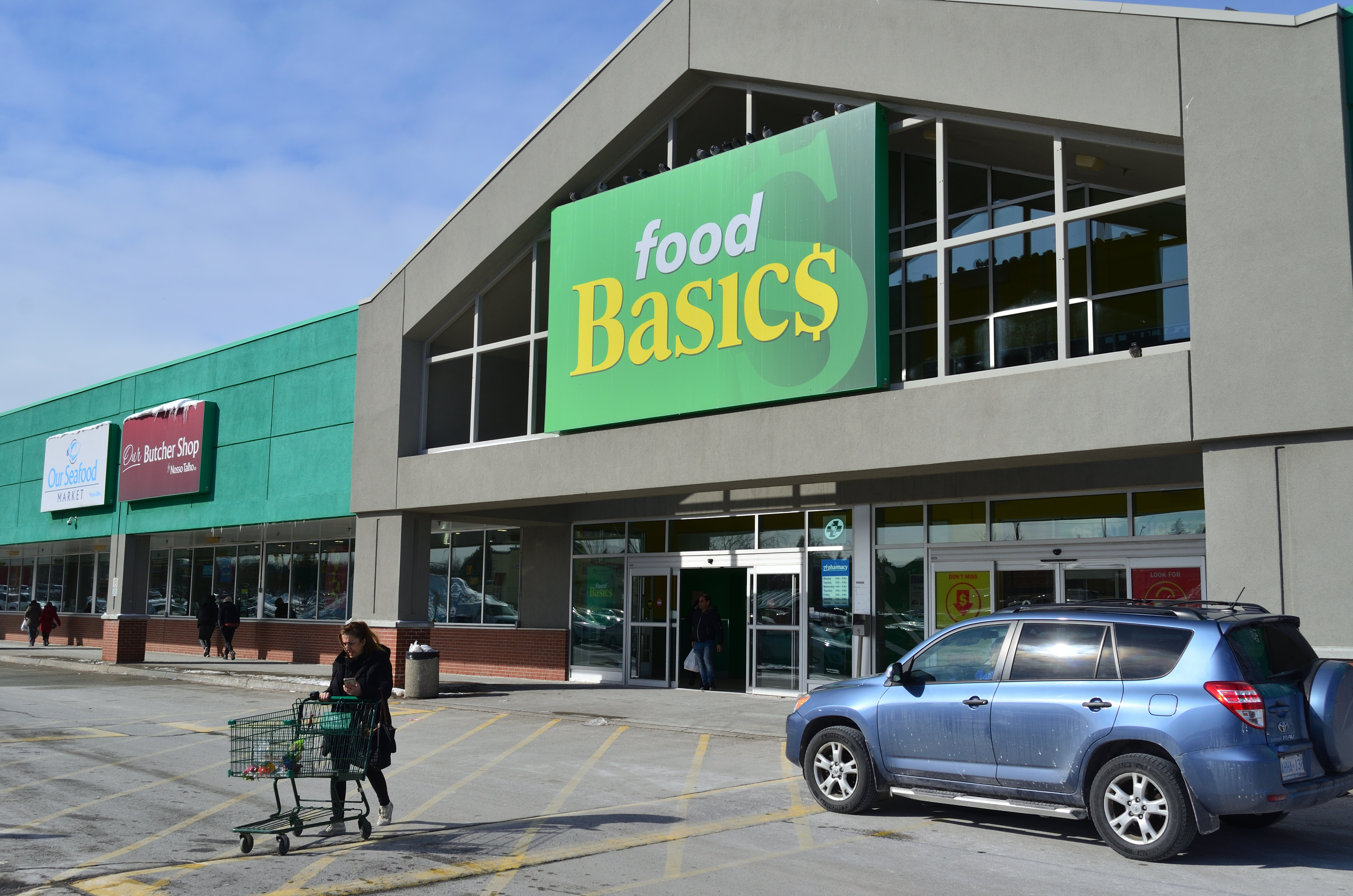
A Food Basics store in Richmond Hill.

== Private label brands ==
Food Basics carries many products from Metro's private label brands:

- "Irresistibles": premium quality products
- "Selection": regular store-brand products
- "Personnelle": pharmacy, health, and personal care products

=== Previous private label brands ===
- "Master Choice": premium quality products.
- "Equality": regular store-brand products.
- "Basics for Less": large economy-sized products.
- "The Baker's Oven": bakery products
- "Great Basics Finds": ready-to-assemble furniture, clothing, housewares and other seasonal items that are specially priced, available in limited quantities, for a limited time
- "Simply 1-2-3": low-price health and beauty products
- "Simply Kids": baby products including diapers, baby food and other baby products

== See also ==
- List of supermarket chains in Canada
- Food Basics (USA) – The now-defunct U.S.-based no-frills supermarket chain controlled by A&P

== Sources ==
- Zwiebach, Elliot (1995-11-27). "A&P Canada is forming franchise unit". Supermarket News.
