= A&P Canada =

Canadian supermarket company

A&P Canada Company
- Type: Subsidiary
- Industry: Supermarket
- Founded: 1927; 99 years ago
- Defunct: December 2009
- Fate: Absorbed into Metro Inc.
- Headquarters: Toronto, Ontario, Canada
- Products: Master Choice products; Dairy, frozen foods, grocery, general merchandise (non-food), meat/deli, pharmacy, produce, snacks
- Parent: The Great Atlantic & Pacific Tea Company (1927–2005); Metro Inc. (2005–2009)
- Website: www.metro.ca

A&P Canada Company was a Canadian supermarket company that operated from 1927 until 2009, when its stores were rebranded under the Metro name by Metro Inc.

== History ==
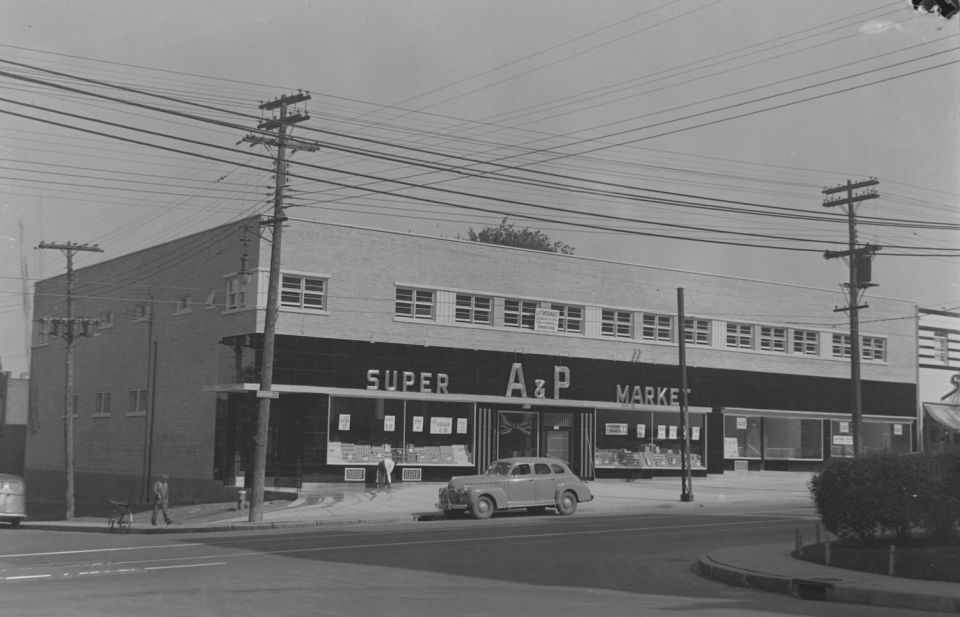
A & P supermarket, Snowdon, Montreal, Quebec, 1941

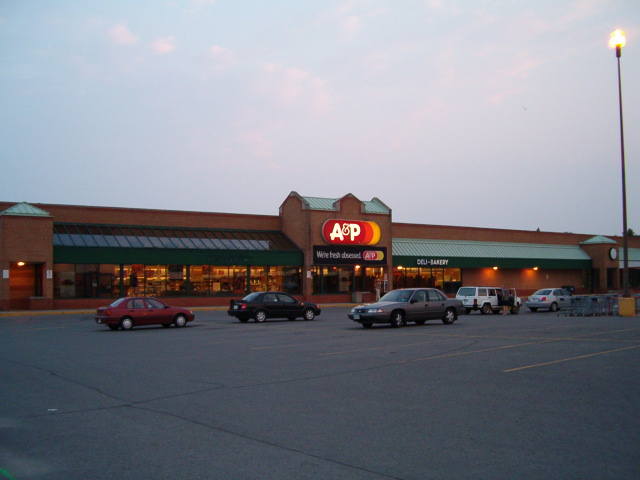
View of a typical A&P store prior to Metro conversion, Belleville, Ontario, July 2007

In 1927, A&P opened its first stores in Canada. By 1929, A&P was present in 200 communities in Ontario and Quebec.

A&P Canada left the Quebec market in 1984, and in 1985 acquired Dominion Stores in Ontario. It acquired Steinberg's Ontario grocery store chains Miracle Food Mart and Ultra Food&Drug in 1990 when the company divested them under new management (Miracle Mart rebranded by 1994 and Ultra by 2008).

In 1999, it acquired the Barn Markets, based in Hamilton, Ontario, and opened its first discount grocery store, Food Basics.

In 2005, A&P Canada Co. operated 135 stores under the banners of: A&P, Dominion and Ultra Food & Drug, in addition to The Barn Markets and Food Basics. It employed over 34,000 employees in Ontario.

On July 19, 2005, Metro Inc. announced that it had reached an agreement with The Great Atlantic & Pacific Tea Company, Inc. and its subsidiary, A&P Luxembourg S.à.r.l., to acquire all of the issued and outstanding common shares of A&P Canada, for an acquisition price of $1.7 billion, consisting of $1.2 billion in cash and $500 million in the form of treasury shares of Metro. The sale was completed on August 15, 2005.

On August 7, 2008, Metro announced it would invest $200 million consolidating the company's conventional food stores under the Metro banner. Over a period of 15 months, all Dominion, A&P, Loeb, The Barn and Ultra banners were converted to the Metro name. Food Basics stores were not directly affected because they compete in the discount food segment, but did see A&P's Master Choice store brand replaced with Metro's Selection and Irresistibles brands.

== See also ==
- The Great Atlantic & Pacific Tea Company (former parent company)
- List of Canadian supermarkets
