= Cominar =

Canadian real estate company

- Type: Private company
- Founded: 1965
- Headquarters: Quebec City, Quebec, Canada
- Key people: Mario D. Morroni (President and CEO)

Cominar is the owner, operator, investor, and developer of real estate across retail, office, residential and mixed-use asset classes, mainly in Québec.

Before March 1, 2022, Cominar was a publicly traded real estate investment trust (REIT) based in Quebec City, Canada. On February 28, 2022, Cominar managed a portfolio consisting of 306 office, retail, and industrial properties, totalling 35.4 million square feet. These properties were located in the province of Quebec and Ontario.

Since then, the company has been selling assets to pay back its debts and finance new development plans. A new management team has been leading Cominar.

== History ==
Cominar was founded in 1965 by Jules Dallaire. The company was originally focused on building apartments in Quebec City. In 1973, it expanded into the construction of condominiums.

In 1986, Cominar developed Place de la Cité in Sainte-Foy, a borough of Quebec City, an office tower set above a shopping concourse.

In 1998, Cominar was listed on the Toronto Stock Exchange as a FPI Cominar (where FPI stands for Fonds de placement immobilier; an unincorporated closed-end investment trust). At the time, Cominar had 51 properties totalling 3.1 million sq.ft. of leasable space, and claimed to be the first fully integrated real estate investment trust in Canada.

In 2009, Cominar completed a public offering of REIT units for a total of $575M (Canadian dollars).

In 2012, Cominar purchased 68 properties representing 4.3 million sq.ft. from GE Capital Real Estate (Canada). In 2014, it announced the purchase of $1.35 billion (Canadian dollars) of properties (a total of 5 million sq.ft.) from Ivanhoé Cambridge, a real estate subsidiary of the Caisse de dépôt et placement du Québec.

In August 2017, following a downgrading of its credit rating by the global credit rating agency DBRS, Cominar announced the divestment of 14% of its holdings for a total of 100 properties. In December 2017, Cominar announced the sale of 97 properties for $1.14 billion (Canadian dollars). As a result of the sale, the company no longer owned properties in Western Canada, in the Toronto area or the Atlantic provinces. Overall, Cominar's property holdings were limited to Ontario and Quebec. At about the same time, Cominar's CEO, Michel Dallaire, was replaced by Sylvain Cossette.

In September 2020, Cominar announced the appointment of Antoine Tronquoy as CFO and Nathalie Rousseau as Executive Vice President, Asset Management and Transactions.

On March 1, 2022, a consortium led by Canderel acquired Cominar for $5.7b, $11.75 per unit, in an all-cash transaction, with its stocks being delisted from the Toronto Stock Exchange.
