= Metro Inc. =

Canadian supermarket company

- Type: Public
- Traded as: TSX: MRU
- Industry: Supermarket
- Founded: 1947; 79 years ago in Verdun, Quebec, Canada
- Founder: Rolland Jeanneau
- Headquarters: Montreal, Quebec, Canada
- Number of locations: 953 Grocery Stores; 648 Drugstores (2020)
- Areas served: Ontario, Quebec
- Key people: Marc Giroux (president and CEO); Nicolas Amyot (SVP, CFO, Treasurer)
- Brands: Private labels: Selection; Irresistibles; Super C
- Revenue: ▲CA$21.20 billion (2024); ▲CA$20.72 billion (2023)
- Operating income: ▲CA$1,683.6 million; (2020)
- Net income: ▲CA$796.4 million; (2020)
- Total assets: ▲CA$13,423.9 million; (2020)
- Total equity: ▲CA$6,155.4 million; (2020)
- Number of employees: 90,000 (2020)
- Divisions: Food Basics; Super C Marché Richelieu; Les 5 Saisons; Marché Ami; The Barn Markets (Operating as "Metro")
- Subsidiaries: Brunet; Jean Coutu Group; Marché Adonis
- Website: metro.ca corpo.metro.ca

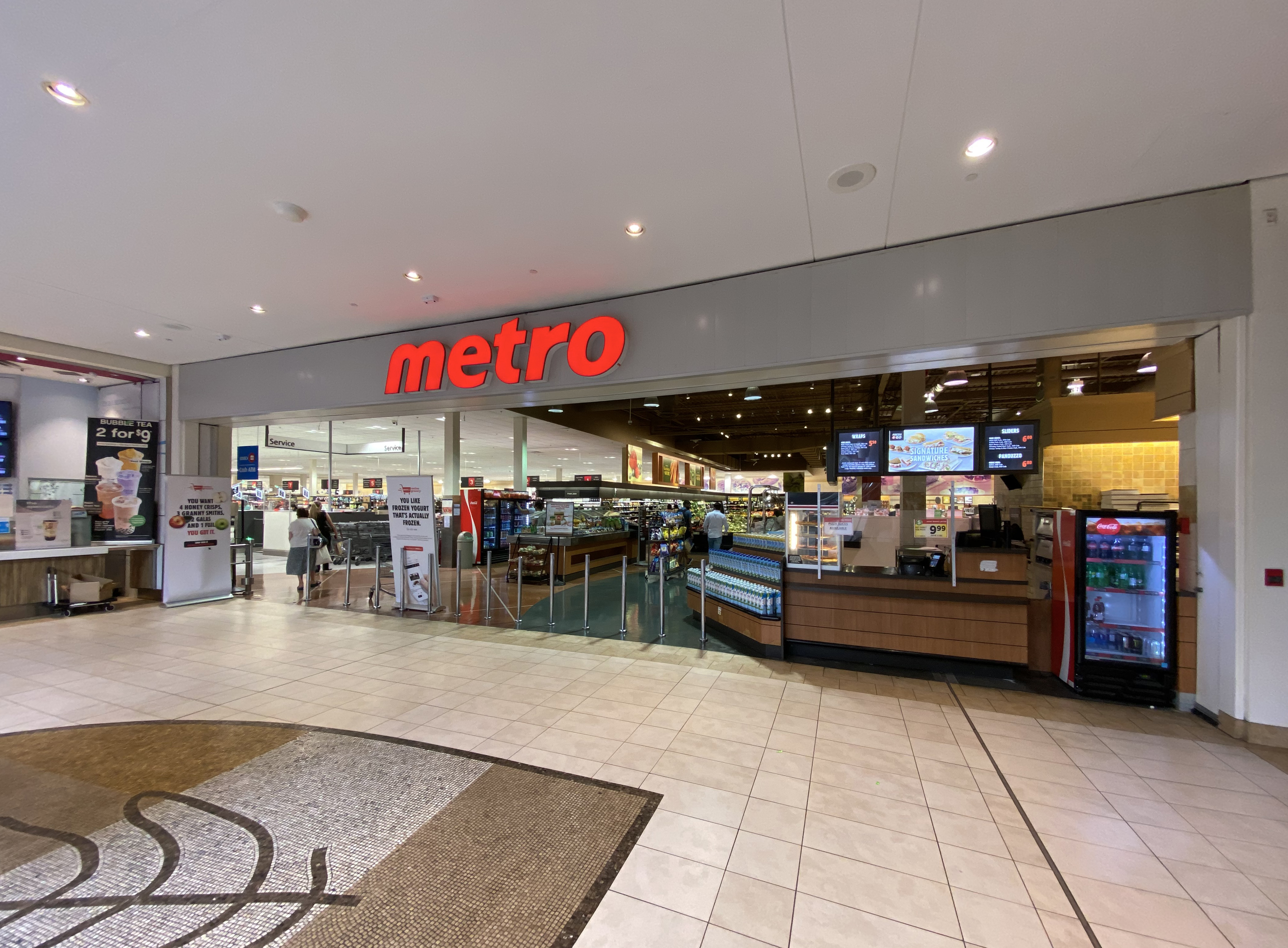
Metro in Bramalea City Centre, Brampton

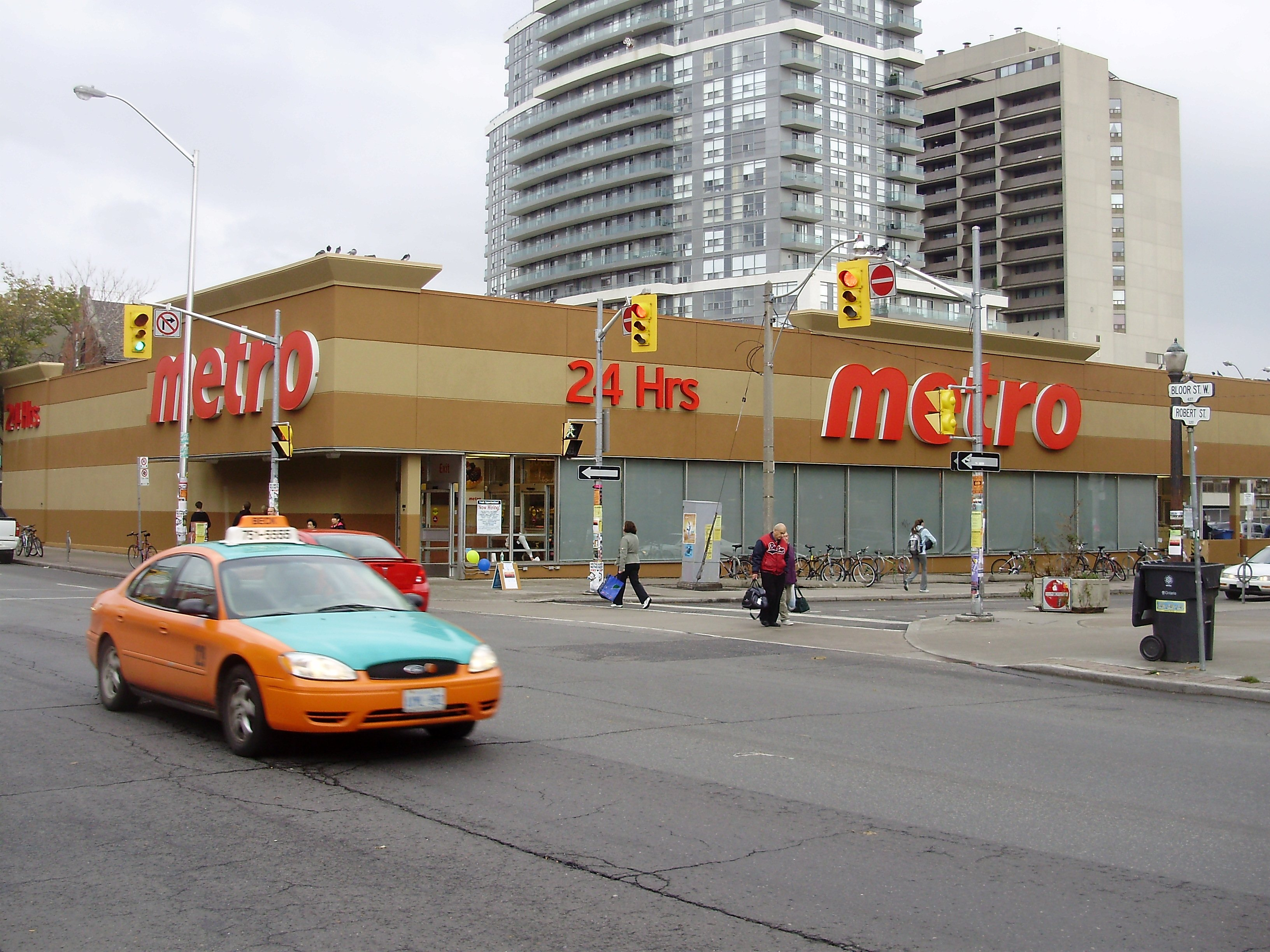
A 24-hour Metro store in Toronto at Bloor and Robert Streets

Metro Inc. is a Canadian supermarket chain operating in the provinces of Quebec and Ontario. The company is based in Montreal, Quebec, with head office at 11011 Boulevard Maurice-Duplessis. Metro is the third-largest grocer in Canada, after Loblaw Companies Limited and Sobeys.

Super C is the discount supermarket division operated in Quebec with 123 stores, averaging 4,000 m^{2} (43,056 sq ft). In Ontario, Metro has 144 discount supermarkets under the Food Basics banner, which are very similar to the Super C stores. Large Metro stores in Quebec operate under the Metro Plus name. Metro also operates 51 groceries stores under the Marché Richelieu banner.

In November 2007, Metro reported a 9.3% increase in earnings for the fiscal year ending September 29, 2007, making $276.6 million in 2007 compared to $253 million in 2006. In 2011 Metro acquired a majority stake (55.5%) (CAD$153.8 million) in Marché Adonis, one of Quebec's biggest ethnic food retailers specializing in Mediterranean food (Marché Adonis sales CAD$73 million 2011). In a March 2020 press release, Metro announced that it will invest about $420 million within next five years for the construction of a new automated distribution centre for fresh and frozen products, which they hope to open in 2023.

== History ==
The company was founded in 1947 in Verdun, Quebec, by Rolland Jeanneau. Many independent grocery stores joined the company to form Magasins Lasalle Stores Ltée. In 1952, Magasins Lasalles Stores Ltée change its name to Épiceries Lasalle Groceteria. The company had 43 affiliated grocery stores at the time. In 1955, there were 50 franchised stores and the company had a revenue of $2 million. The company gained fame in 1956 through an advertisement in La Presse for turkeys at 39 cents. That year, Mayor Jean Drapeau was already talking about implementing in Montreal a rapid transit system to be called the Montreal Metro, which inspired the company to create a division called Metro. Other grocery stores joined the company bringing its number of stores to 73 in 1957 with revenue of $10 million.

Because of the success of the Metro division, the company renamed itself Metro-Lasalle in 1963. In 1972, Metro-Lasalle changed its name to Metro-Ltée. Metro merged with the Marché Richelieu grocery chain in 1975 to become Groupe Metro-Richelieu Inc in 1976.

In the early 1980s, Metro went through harder times because of fierce competition from Provigo and the ongoing recession. Metro merged with Epiciers Unis Inc. and took on the name Metro-Richelieu Inc. (dropping the "Groupe" from its name). During the rest of the 1980s, it fared better and entered the Montreal Stock Exchange in 1986.

Metro suffered from the early 1990s recession. A restructuring plan was established and changes were brought in the management team. Metro acquired 48 of 112 Steinberg supermarkets when that company went bankrupt in 1992. Metro entered the Toronto Stock Exchange in 1993. It acquired Loeb Stores from Loblaws in 1999. The Metro Plus banner was established in the early 2000s. Some of the stores were converted to Super C, and others continued to operate as Loeb. The Super C stores in Ontario were converted to Food Basics. In 2009, the company converted all Loeb stores to Metro.

=== Mergers and acquisitions ===
On July 19, 2005, after beating out Sobeys in a bidding war, Metro announced that it had reached an agreement with The Great Atlantic & Pacific Tea Company to acquire A&P Canada, for an acquisition price of $1.7 billion, consisting of $1.2 billion in cash and $500 million in the form of treasury shares of Metro. While the all-cash offer made by Sobeys was reportedly a higher bid than Metro's, it was suggested that the Sobey family was unwilling to cede any control to the Tengelmann Group, the ultimate parent company of A&P at the time. Though Sobeys remained the second largest grocery chain in Canada overall, it was a distant third place in most of the provinces outside the Atlantic region, particularly Ontario, where it was looking to bolster its weak position. Since A&P Canada was the second-largest grocery chain in Ontario after Loblaws, Metro's takeover effectively vaulted it to a strong market position there, where it previously had no presence. The acquisition of A&P Canada was completed on August 15, 2005, with Metro having a network in Quebec and Ontario of 573 full-service and discount food supermarkets, and 256 pharmacies.

On August 7, 2008, Metro announced that it would invest $200 million consolidating the company's conventional food stores under the Metro banner. Over a period of 15 months, all Dominion, A&P, Loeb, the Barn, and Ultra Food & Drug banners were converted to the Metro name. Food Basics stores were not affected as it competes in the discount food segment.

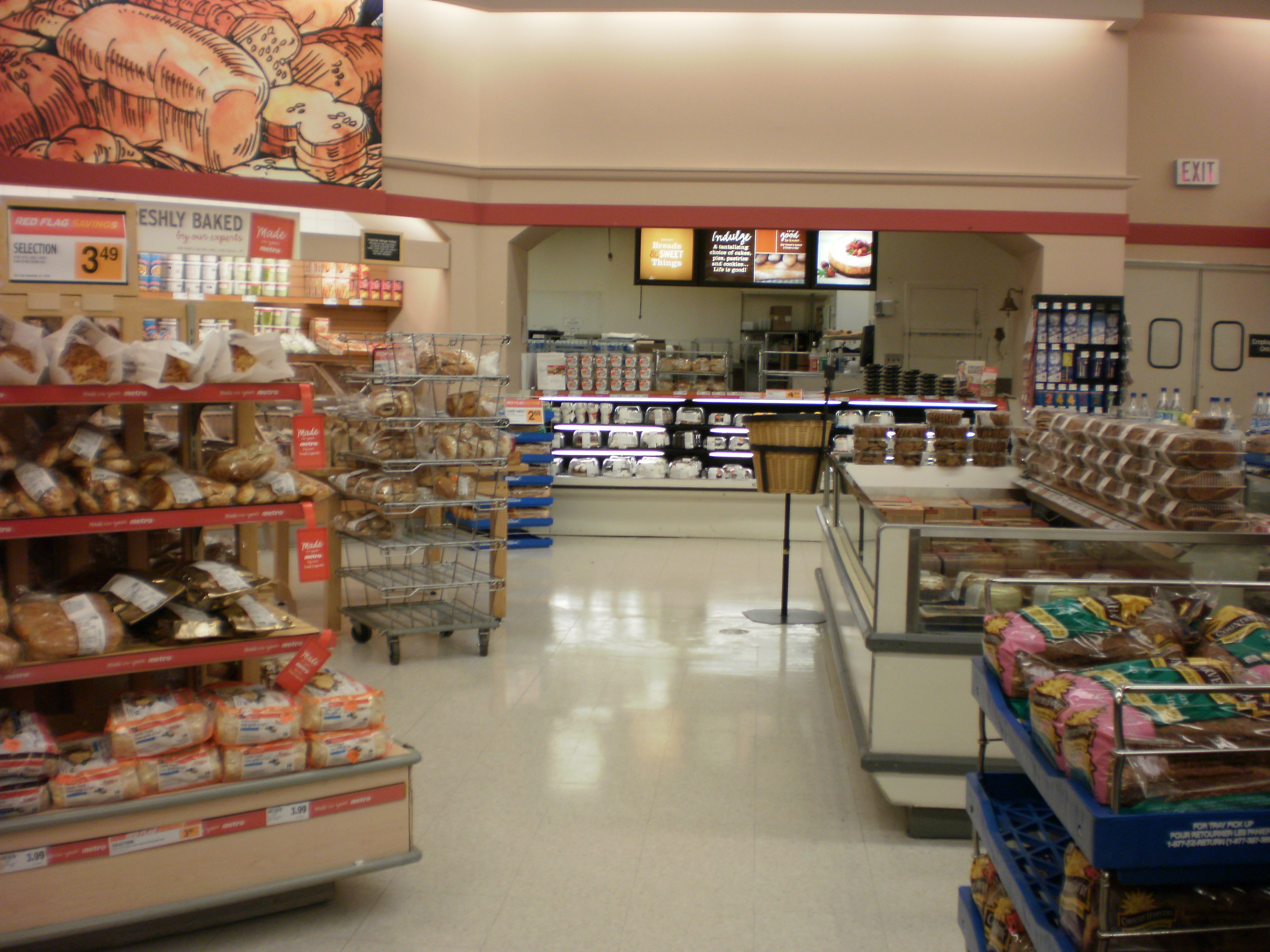
Baker section of a Metro store in Brampton

Metro now holds the second largest market share in the food distribution and retailing business in Quebec and Ontario with nearly $11 billion in sales and more than 65,000 employees. Its stores operate under the banners Metro, Metro Plus, Super C, Food Basics, Marché Ami, Les 5 Saisons and Marché Adonis. Its pharmacies operate under the banners Brunet, The Pharmacy, Clini-Plus, and Drug Basics.

In 2017, Metro acquired the Canadian meal kit service Miss Fresh.

In May 2018, Metro closed a $4.5 billion (CAD) acquisition of the Quebec drug chain Jean Coutu Group, making it one of Canada’s largest retailers and distributors of food and drugs.

=== 2023 Unifor Local 414 strike ===
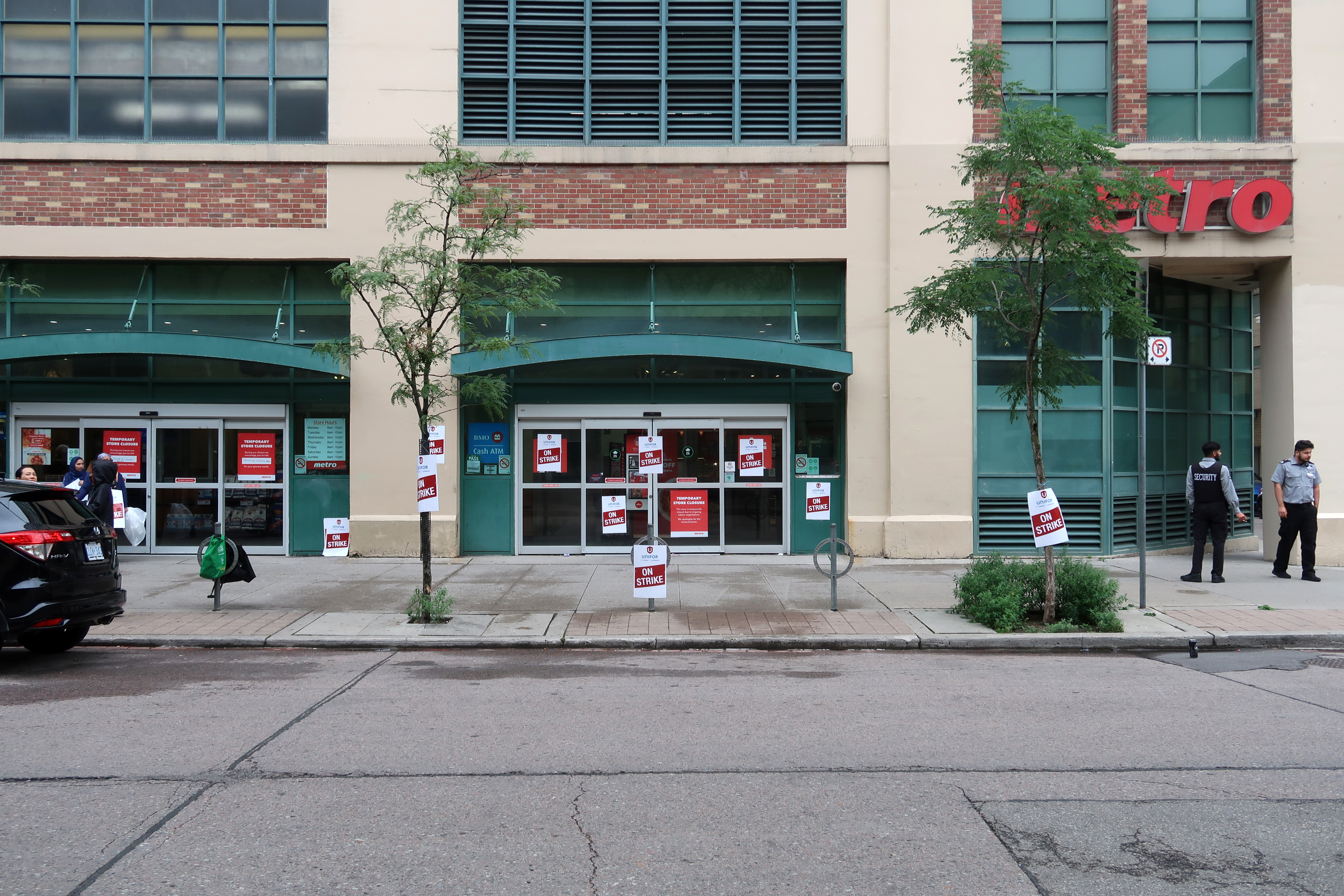
Exterior of a closed Metro store in Ontario during the 2023 strike

On July 29, 2023, front-line grocery store workers represented by Unifor rejected a tentative collective agreement and took strike action at 27 Greater Toronto Area stores. The union's priorities included job precarity, job quality, wages and cost of living. The company reported high profits and earnings in its third quarter report. The strike ended a month later, with all workers' wages increased by $1.50/hr immediately and full-time and senior part-time workers earning an additional $0.50/hr beginning in January 2024.

== Loyalty programs ==
=== Moi Rewards ===
In the early 2010s, Metro stores in Quebec launched an in-house loyalty program, metro&moi (Metro and Me), later rebranded simply Moi (or alternately Moi Rewards in English-speaking Canada) upon expansion to other Metro-owned banners such as Jean Coutu in 2023. Customers earn 1 point for every $1 spent at Metro in Quebec (1 point per $3 spent at Metro in Ontario; offers vary at co-owned banners like Food Basics), which can be converted to rewards at the rate of $1 per 125 points accumulated, with a minimum balance of 500 points required for redemptions.

=== Previous programs ===
A&P and Dominion stores in Ontario, excluding those in Thunder Bay, had joined the Air Miles coalition loyalty program in September 1997. Metro maintained this partnership following its acquisition and rebranding of A&P Canada, but could not expand the program to its Quebec locations due to Air Miles' partnership at the time with Sobeys/IGA in eastern Canada. In April 2024, Metro announced it would end its participation in Air Miles (later announced as being effective July 21), with Moi Rewards launching in its place in October 2024.

A&P (later Metro) stores in Thunder Bay were also blocked from participating in Air Miles by a pre-existing relationship with Safeway (later also acquired by Sobeys). These stores instead offered the in-house Thunder Bucks program, which functioned similarly but only offered Metro gift certificates as rewards. Thunder Bucks was also wound down and replaced by Moi Rewards in October 2024.

== See also ==
- List of supermarket chains in Canada
- Food Basics
- Super C
