= Pen Centre =

Coordinates: 43.136°N 79.225°W

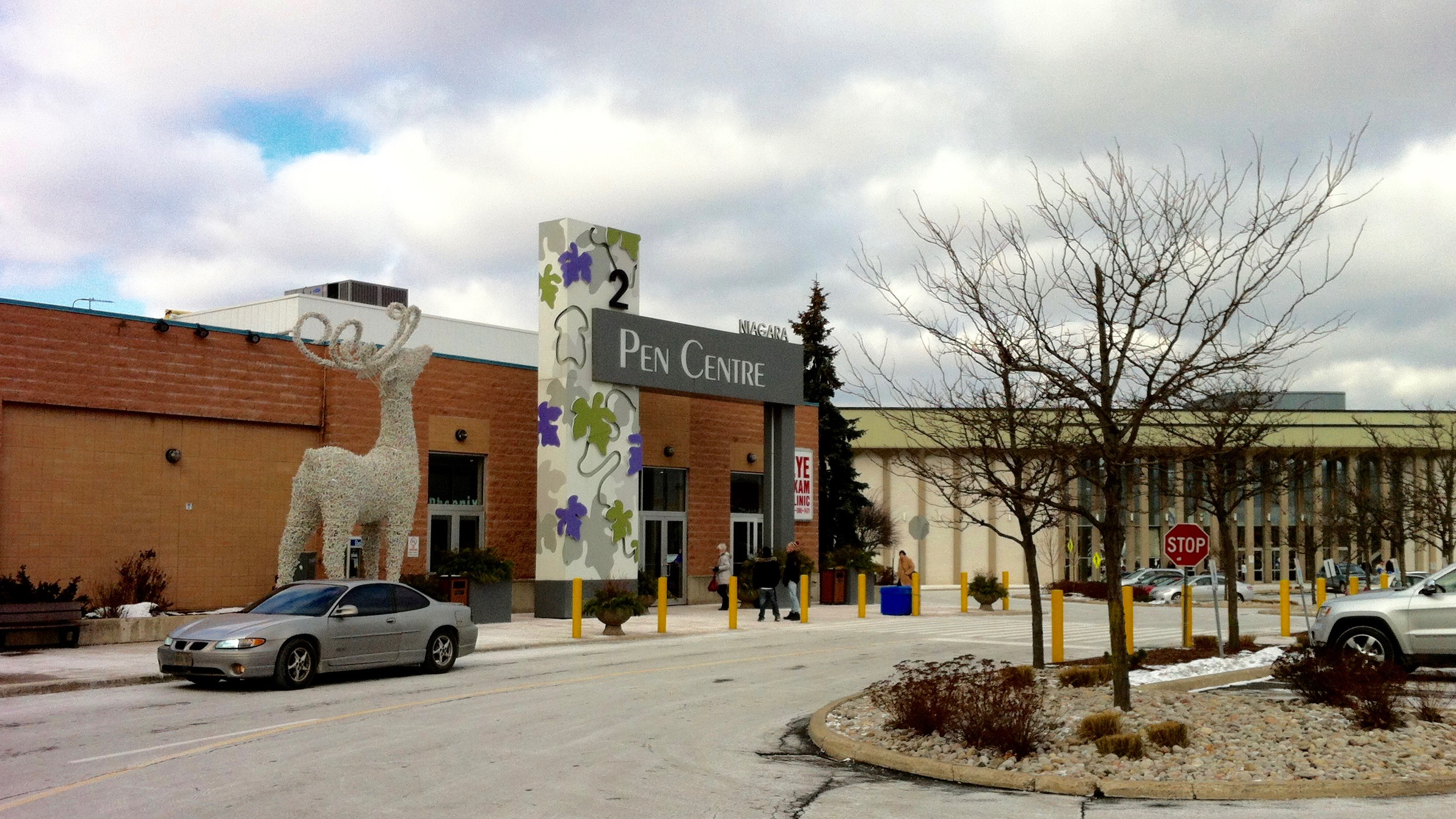
- Exterior shot of the Pen Centre viewed from the south-east
- Location: St. Catharines, Ontario, Canada
- Address: 221 Glendale Avenue
- Opened: 1958
- Manager: Leyad
- Owner: Leyad
- Num. of stores: 180
- Num. of anchor tenants: 4
- Floor area: 1,036,696 sq ft (96,312.2 m^{2})
- Floors: 1
- Parking: 5000

The Pen Centre (originally Niagara Peninsula Shopping Centre) is the largest shopping mall in the Niagara Region, located in St. Catharines, Ontario, Canada.

== History ==
The Pen Centre was built in 1957 as the Niagara Peninsula Centre, a single-level, outside strip mall anchored by Loblaws and 50 retail stores and opened in 1958. In 1966, the evolution of the Pen Centre included the addition of Simpsons-Sears and 80 new stores, making the Pen Centre the fourth largest shopping centre in Canada. The mall remained as an open strip, with landscaped walkways in between. By September 1975, the strip mall was enclosed and became a climate-controlled environment at the cost of $2 million. Located next to the Highway 406, it has over one million square feet of floor space and features over 180 stores, a major department store, a supermarket, a ten-screen movieplex, and several large format anchors.

Famous Players opened the first SilverCity 8-screen multiplex cinema at that location on November 7, 1997. It is now owned by Landmark Cinemas.

In 2011, the mall began a $13 million renovation of the common space, including 3,600 sq. ft. of new skylights, a new food court, and floors and ceiling treatments. The renovations were completed in 2012.

Target announced opening a store in the Pen Centre's former Zellers location in 2013. Just over a year later, in April 2015, Target shuttered all of its Canadian stores. Later in 2015, the location was sold to Walmart, which began construction on a newly revamped building in February 2018, and opened on August 22, 2019. Sears closed its store along with all other Canadian stores in January 2018. The former space occupied by Sears was renovated into two large format stores Sport Chek which relocated from elsewhere in the mall (opening summer 2020) and Mark's (opening early 2021) as well as numerous smaller retail spaces. In addition, Trillium College opened in the basement of this space in November 2020. As a result of the COVID-19 pandemic environment the remainder of these retail units remain vacant.

== See also ==
- List of largest enclosed shopping malls in Canada
