= Miracle Mart =

Canadian discount department store chain

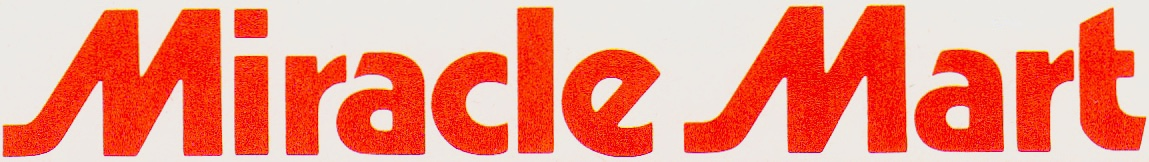
- Company type: Subsidiary
- Industry: Retail
- Founded: 1961
- Defunct: 1992
- Fate: Bankruptcy, dissolved
- Headquarters: Saint-Laurent, Quebec, Canada
- Products: Discount store
- Parent: Steinberg

Miracle Mart was a chain of discount department stores with locations in Ontario and Quebec, Canada based in Saint-Laurent, Quebec. The chain was renamed to simply M in the mid-1980s.

== History ==
The company was founded in early 1961 as Miracle Mart Limited by Montreal-based grocery chain Steinberg's. Later in the year, Steinberg's associated itself with Vancouver-based chain Woodward's. They opened their first store on October 11, 1961, in Pont-Viau under the trade name Woodward Steinberg. A second store with the same trademark opened in November 1961 at the Place Greenfield Park shopping centre. The partnership between Steinberg's and Woodward ended in 1962 due to differences of opinions, and the two Woodward Steinberg stores were converted to the Miracle Mart name.

Miracle Mart operated at mid-level and competed with the likes of Towers/Bonimart, Zellers, Woolco and Kmart. There was also a similarly named grocery chain, Miracle Food Mart (Steinberg's rebranded all their Ontario grocery stores to Miracle Food Marts on January 15, 1969), that operated exclusively in Ontario. Often found together, some locations with both a grocery and department store were regrouped under the single name Beaucoup.

In order to provide photographic film-processing services at Miracle Mart stores, a company was created by the Greenberg brothers, named Angreen Photo, which evolved into Astral Photo and became giant Astral Media.

M stores logo

After years of losses, parent company Steinberg's underwent in the mid-1980s a restructuring plan to rebrand the chain to the shorter name of M. By then, Miracle Mart had made profits only twice since its founding. The transformation of Miracle Mart locations into M stores was done in different phases. Miracle Mart at Carrefour Laval was the first location to convert as a M store and the only one to do so in the year of 1985. Four additional stores in Greater Montreal were converted to the M name by August 1986; specifically at Promenades Saint-Bruno, Place Longueuil, Mail Champlain and Pont-Viau. Four more stores, again all located in the Montreal area, were added to the M cluster on April 8, 1987: Châteauguay, West Island Mall, Place Lasalle and Galeries Lachine. The remaining 11 Miracle Mart stores were renamed on August 19, 1987.

Overall, only 20 of Miracle Mart's 31 stores rebranded to the M nameplate. The other 11 locations (seven in Ontario and four in Quebec) were closed during the restructuring process. This basically erased the chain from Ontario except for two Ottawa stores (both in Nepean) that rebranded as M. Other Miracle Mart stores had already been closed in the 1970s and first half of the 1980s due to poor performance.

The M sub-chain was initially successful and promising. In December 1986, the five M stores saw their sales increased while the remaining Miracle Mart-branded locations continued to decline. Despite a good start, the M chain began to go downhill after the last Miracle Mart stores were renamed in 1987, and was soon experiencing the same financial woes that had plagued its predecessor. At some point, the name of the chain was modified to M Aubaine (M Discount), signaling a return to its roots as a discount retailer. However, all this ended up accomplishing was to confuse and alienate even more customers who had been accustomed to a more upscale image of the chain since the 1980s.

When Steinberg's parent Socanav was trying to sell parts of the company off, a buyer for the poorly performing M stores could not be found. The chain went bankrupt in June 1992 and the liquidation of the 19 stores began in early July. The original store in Pont-Viau, Laval was still in operation when the company declared bankruptcy. By late August, 15 of the 19 stores had already closed. On August 29, 1992, the stores at Place Versailles, Carrefour Laval and Les Promenades St-Bruno followed. It was said that the fourth remaining M store could possibly outlast the others as it negotiated termination over its lease, but it seems to have closed down as well on August 29, 1992. On the 1992-1993 Montreal phone book directory, Bell Canada listed only four stores for the M retail chain; they are the three aforementioned mall locations that closed on August 29, 1992, and the other one at 4325 Jean-Talon Street in Saint-Léonard.
