= Steinberg's (supermarket) =

Canadian supermarket chain

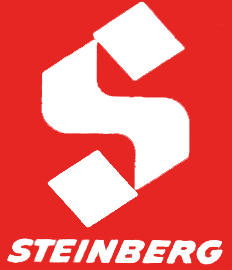
- Type: Private
- Industry: Supermarket
- Founded: 1917
- Defunct: September 5, 1992
- Fate: Bankruptcy; supermarkets sold to Metro, Provigo and IGA
- Headquarters: Montreal, Quebec, Canada
- Products: Bakery, beer, dairy, deli, frozen foods, general grocery, liquor, meat & poultry, pharmacy, produce, seafood, snacks.
- Subsidiaries: Miracle Mart/M; Les 5 Saisons; Valdi Foods; Cardinal Distributors; Pik-Nik; Ivanhoe; Miracle Food Mart

Steinberg's (renamed Steinberg in 1961) was a large family-owned Canadian grocery store chain that mainly operated in the province of Quebec and later Ontario. In addition to its flagship supermarket chain, the company operated several subsidiaries across the country. The company went bankrupt in 1992, three years after being sold to private interests, after 75 years in business.

== Beginning ==
Steinberg's began as a grocery store founded in 1917 in Montreal by Jewish-Hungarian immigrant, Ida Steinberg. Her five sons, led by Sam Steinberg, grew the company from a tiny storefront on St. Lawrence Boulevard into the most popular and largest supermarket chain in Quebec. It was the first to create the "supermarket" concept in Quebec, in 1934, with expansions into Ontario (primarily the Ottawa area) and parts of New Brunswick.

== Expansion ==
Steinberg's opened more stores in Montreal and Quebec over the years. Steinberg's entered the real estate market in 1952 under the name Ivanhoe Investments and owned several shopping centres. During the expansion years, the plan was to landbank properties in Quebec for future development into shopping centres and stores. Ivanhoe turned out to be one of Steinberg's most profitable ventures and continues today under the name Ivanhoe Cambridge. Steinberg's also had holdings in food production and distribution.

In keeping with increasing French language pressures in Quebec, Steinberg's dropped the possessive "'s" from its name to become "Steinberg" in 1961. This was accompanied with the introduction of a new logo as shown above this article (the previous logo had consisted of Sam Steinberg's personal signature). Despite the change, the chain continued to be referred to as "Steinberg's" among the English speaking Quebecers and media throughout its history and beyond.

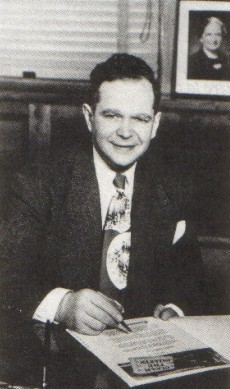
Sam Steinberg

For several decades, and until the late 1980s, Steinberg's was the largest supermarket chain in the province of Quebec. Store outlets could be spotted in nearly every district of the island of Montreal and were major competitors for chains like Provigo and Metro. Sam Steinberg was one of the first employers to implement mandatory bilingualism (English and French) for all his personnel and as a result, the company became so entrenched in Quebec culture that among French speaking Quebecers, "Je fais mon Steinberg" ("I'm doing my Steinberg's") became a synonym for going grocery shopping, regardless of supermarket chain.

In 1959, Steinberg's made its expansion west of Ottawa into Ontario by acquiring 38 Ontario stores that Grand Union had put up for sale. This formed the basis of Steinberg's Ontario division. Until Loblaws expanded into Quebec through acquisition, there had been an unspoken agreement between Steinberg's and Loblaws that one would not enter the other's market. What Steinberg's found was that the locations of many of the Grand Union stores they acquired were in less-than-ideal locations compared to their already established competitors, and over time most were closed or relocated to new stores. The Ontario stores lost money because of competition, poor locations, and the imposition of a Quebec style of management and retailing that did not suit the Ontario market. The branding of Steinberg's Ontario supermarkets was changed in the late 1960s to Miracle Food Marts outside of eastern Ontario, some operating next to a Miracle Mart department store. A new food and drug store chain, Miracle Ultra-Mart stores, was introduced in the mid-1980s. The main warehousing and administrative offices were in Rexdale (Etobicoke, now part of Toronto). The Ottawa, Cornwall, and Brockville stores were part of the Quebec division rather than the Ontario division.

At one point a hypermarket was introduced called Steinberg Beaucoup, which consisted of a Steinberg's grocery, a Miracle Mart department store, and Le Quick and Pik-Nik restaurants, all under the same roof. In Ontario, they were opened as "Miracle Beaucoup" stores with Miracle Food Mart as the grocery store. The first two Beaucoup stores were opened in Laval, Quebec, and Bramalea, Ontario.

Steinberg's owned and operated several well-known businesses aside from their own name-brand supermarket chain:

- Miracle Mart, established in 1961. A discount department store chain (led by daughter Mitzi and renamed "M" store), carried clothing, toys, household appliances and goods. The "M" department stores ceased operations shortly after Steinberg's went bankrupt.
- Miracle Food Mart, a supermarket chain operating in the Ontario regions where there were no stores of the grocery chain Steinberg's (they had been rebranded as such starting in 1969). Ontario operations had been poor in early years, but by the time they were sold to A&P Canada they were one of the more valuable assets remaining in the company.
- Valdi, a limited assortment (discount) grocery chain in Ontario and the western provinces, Valdi was founded in 1979.
- Pik-Nik, launched as drive in restaurants, and popular snack bars operating in shopping malls, established in 1966.
- Le Quick, a restaurant chain, also often located in malls with a Steinberg store.
- Cardinal Distributors, a mail-order gift catalogue, that merged in 1979 with Consumers Distributing
- Smitty's Super Value Inc., a small Arizona-based supermarket chain, acquired 1981. Sold to the Yucaipa Companies in 1994.
- Xtra, a briefly operated discount supermarket chain introduced around 1990.
- Ivanhoe Inc, their real estate and development arm. With its vast real estate portfolio, it was the most valuable asset in the company by the time it was sold off.
- Steinberg Foods Limited, the company's own Montreal bakery and food production facilities, established in 1966.
- Trillium Meats, Steinberg's own meat-wholesaling company
- Cartier Refined Sugars Limited, established in 1963. Steinberg's acquired a large stake in 1966 and eventually acquired the company.
- La Maisonnée, a chain of convenience stores in Quebec, was sold in 1988 to the Toronto-based Silcorp Ltd.

In addition, Steinbergs had partial ownership of:

- Price Club, a popular American wholesale club store. Steinberg was the exclusive operator in Canada of the chain starting in 1985 and also owned a 50% stake in the company.
- Lantic Sugar owned a 50% stake via the sale of Cartier Sugar in 1981.
- Phoenix Mills Inc., a large flour mill, Steinberg's acquired 30% ownership of in the late 1960s.

== Decline ==
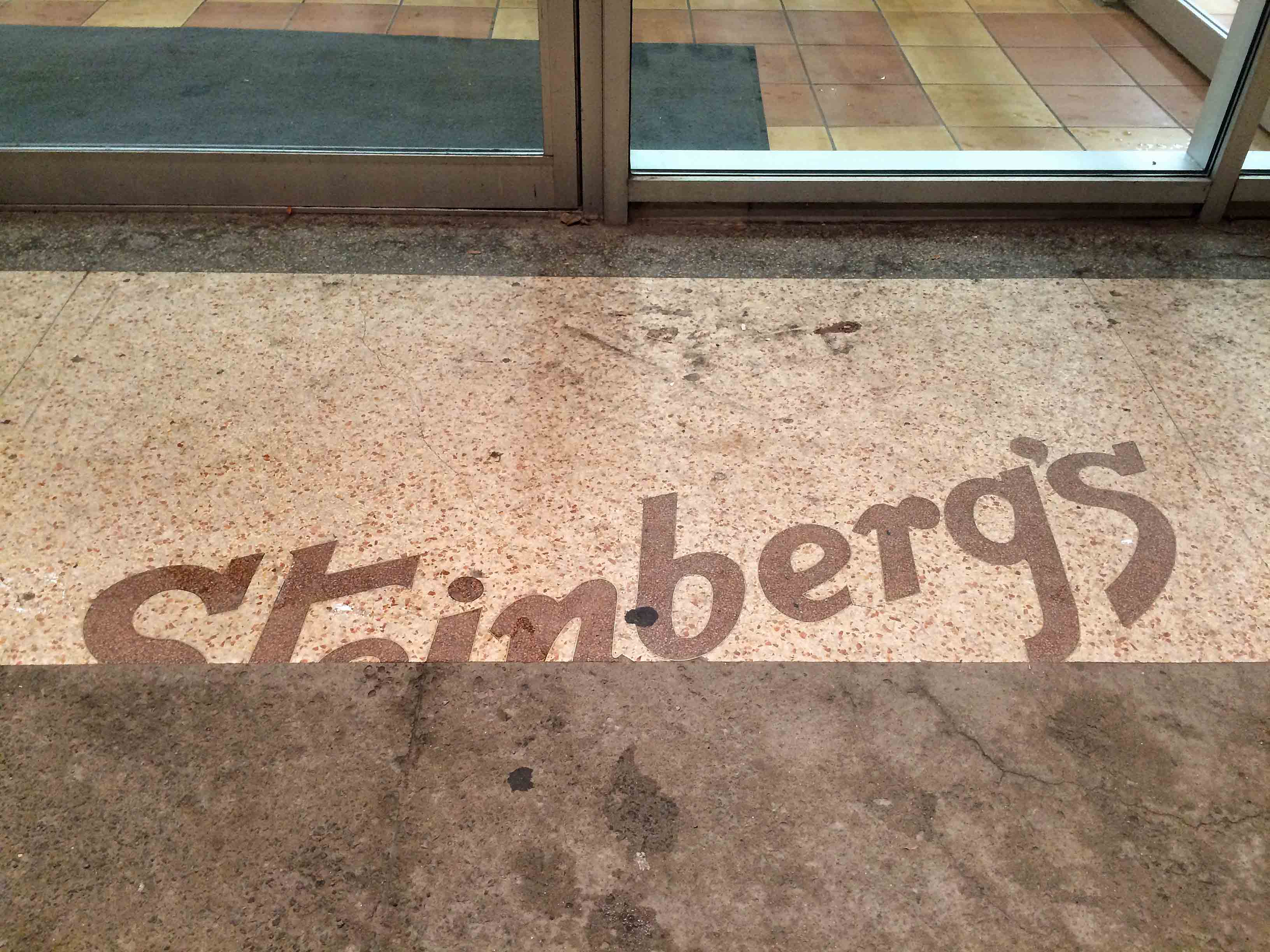
A few signs of Steinberg's past remain, such as this logo on the floor at the entrance of a former store in Montreal which is now operated by the Metro supermarket chain.

Trouble started brewing for the chain after the death of Sam Steinberg in 1978. His laissez-faire dealings with the union and lack of a succession plan for the company began its decline, and resulted in a trend of higher unionized labour costs than other unionized and non-union supermarkets, and a general loss of direction of the company without its former leader. Things worsened rapidly when a power struggle developed between his daughter Mitzi, her husband Mel Dobrin, daughter Marilyn Steinberg Cobrin, and daughter Evelyn Steinberg. Each held equal controlling shares in the company through trusts, but these shares and those of their mother, Helen, were stipulated to be voted together as one, to keep control of the company in the family.

After a number of years under lackluster leadership, Irving Ludmer became CEO in April 1984. Ludmer was a former Steinberg's real estate vice president who worked with the company from 1957 until leaving to start his own real estate company in 1971. He tried to reinvigorate the company and give it some direction following the chaotic years since Sam's death. He had rejoined the real estate branch Ivanhoe in 1983 and had become close to Sam during his early years at the company. He initiated sweeping changes throughout the company, resulting in improved sales, stock prices, and a general all-around improvement in Steinberg's, making it more attractive on the stock market.

By the end of the 1980s, family infighting, power struggles, rising costs, and increased competition were taking their toll, and Steinberg's was placed on the auction block for an estimated $1.5 billion. The Ontario-based Loblaws chain attempted to acquire Steinberg's, but was blocked by the Quebec provincial government on nationalist grounds. Other potential buyers included Toronto-based Oxdon Investments, Oxford Development, Metro-Richelieu, Provigo, and a leveraged buyout from company executives Irving Ludmer and Arnold Steinberg. In the end, the company was sold for $1.3 billion on August 22, 1989, to a joint bid between Socanav (a marine shipping firm with no experience in retail, and whose major shareholder Michel Gaucher helped set up the deal) and the Caisse de dépôt et placement du Québec, Quebec's pension-fund manager.

Under Socanav's ownership, Steinberg's ran some locations as franchises for the first time, a practice traditionally reserved for smaller Quebec grocery chains such as Metro-Richelieu and IGA. The company could save on labour costs, as those stores could employ non-unionized labour paid at lower wages than Steinberg's company-operated stores.

M stores logo

== End of Steinberg's ==
The buyout of Steinberg's was highly leveraged. Despite improved profitability and cash flow results from Steinberg's after the buyout, various parts of the company were auctioned off by new owner Socanav to help pay down the heavy debt load incurred. The Caisse de dépôt et placement du Québec wanted Steinberg's real estate arm Ivanhoe for its attractive portfolio from the start, and acquired it for $887 million in 1990. Steinberg's 50% stakes in both Lantic Sugar and Price Club were sold in 1990 for $110 million and $58 million, respectively. After ongoing talks, A&P Canada agreed to buy the Ontario operations (consisting of 58 Miracle Food Marts, 11 Miracle Ultra-Marts, and Ontario divisional offices in Etobicoke) in July 1990 for $235 million, with the closing date of October 20, 1990. The stores continued to operate under their former names, but were eventually rebranded under the "A&P" and "Dominion", and Ultra Mart/Ultra Food & Drug banners.

The final 10 Ontario stores in the Ottawa, Cornwall and Brockville locations (not included in the sale to A&P since they were all part of the Quebec division) were bought by Loblaws (under National Grocer Co.) in January 1992 and either converted to "Loblaws" or "Your Independent Grocer" banners, or closed. The sale included two operating as Xtra Discount supermarkets. Those were the final stores Steinberg's owned in Ontario, aside from 74 Valdi stores that the chain held onto (a combined 101 in Ontario & Quebec). Valdi Foods remained a company subsidiary until the stores in the western provinces were closed in 1991/92.

Attempts to sell off more assets and restructure the company (including rebranding some stores and franchising others) were difficult due to Steinberg's higher labour wages, the 1990–1992 recession, suppliers being unsure of supplying the highly leveraged company, pressure from creditors, mounting losses, and interest payments on debt from the leveraged buyout. In May 1992, court protection was obtained in order to liquidate the company and pay off creditors. Loblaws again attempted to buy the chain. They were again foiled by the Quebec government, which arranged for Steinberg's stores to be sold to its two major local competitors, Metro Richelieu and Provigo. To avoid accusations of monopoly, Provigo resold half of its Steinberg's stores to IGA.

By mid-1992, Steinberg's and its poor-performing department store chain M began to be phased out. Most of Steinberg's grocery stores were absorbed and converted by its competitors, while the M locations closed outright as no buyer could be found for them. Even within the grocery chain proper, 16 of the locations had no buyer. Six of these stores closed on August 29, 1992 and the other ten followed suit on September 5, 1992 in the cities of Rimouski, Chicoutimi, Longueuil, Hull, Saint-Hubert, Quebec City, Saint-Bruno, Saint-Jérôme, Laval and Bromont. The Steinberg's stores that were acquired were split among five supermarket chains: Metro, IGA, Maxi, Héritage and Provigo. None of Steinberg's locations directly converted to Super C though a few of the stores that turned into Metro in 1992 later rebranded to Super C in the mid-1990s.

Although Steinberg's, Miracle Mart/M, Miracle Food Mart, Valdi, and Cardinal Distributors are now defunct, Sam Steinberg is survived by his real estate company Ivanhoe (which absorbed Cambridge Shopping Centres Ltd in 2001 to become Ivanhoe Cambridge). His restaurant chain, Pik-Nik, founded in 1966, lasted until the mid-2010s.

Succession for the Steinberg's grocery chain was the subject of a 1974 National Film Board of Canada documentary by Arthur Hammond entitled After Mr. Sam.

== See also ==
- Corporation (TV series), about the Steinberg's chain
- List of Canadian supermarkets
