= BPL =

BPL may refer to:

== Places ==
- Bhopal Junction railway station, India (by station code)
- Bole Alashankou Airport, China (by IATA airport code)
- The contractional slang for Blackpool, UK

== Economics and finance ==
- Bank pool loan, a type of loan
- Below Poverty Line, an Indian economic indicator
- Bloomberg Polarlake, a subsidiary of Bloomberg L.P

== Enterprises ==
- BPL Group, an electronics conglomerate in India

== Public libraries ==
- Birmingham Public Library, in Alabama, United States
- Boston Public Library, in Massachusetts, United States
- Brooklyn Public Library, in New York, United States
- Burlington Public Library (Ontario), in Burlington, Ontario
- Burnaby Public Library, in British Columbia, Canada
- Bloomington Public Library, in Illinois, United States
- Busolwe Public Library, in Busolwe, Uganda

== Science and technology ==
- beta-Propiolactone, a compound used for virus deactivation, and as a precursor for synthesis of other compounds.
- Bio Products Laboratory, UK blood plasma products company
- BPL (complexity), a computational complexity theory class
- BPL (time service), a long-wave time signal service from China
- Broadband over power lines, in telecommunications
- Biopollution level
- Bone phosphate of lime or Tricalcium phosphate
- In mathematics, the classifying space of piecewise linear structures on a manifold

== Sports ==
- Bangladesh Premier League, a Twenty20 cricket league
- Bangladesh Premier League, a former name of the Bangladesh Football League (2012–2025)
- Belarusian Premier League, an association football league in Belarus
- Brisbane Premier League, an association football league in Australia
- Barclays Premier League, sponsored name of the Premier League, an association football league in the United Kingdom, from 2007 to 2016
- Bhutan Premier League, top division association football league in Bhutan

== See also ==
- Calculus of negligence, also known as the BPL formula
