= David Radler =

Canadian executive (born 1944)

F. David Radler (born 1942 in Montreal, Quebec) is a Canadian executive active in finance and news media. Radler was once president of Ravelston Corporation, a privately owned corporation owned by Conrad Black and Radler to control their former newspaper empire. Ravelston owned Argus Corporation which in turn controlled Chicago-based Hollinger International. In 2005, 14.1% of Ravelston was owned by Radler.

== Career ==
Radler graduated from Queen's University in 1967 with a master's degree in Business Administration. In the 1980s Radler was in charge of the sale of Argus Corporation's Dominion supermarket chain to The Great Atlantic and Pacific Tea Company, or A&P. As well, Radler was once based in Chicago to help Black's media business—managed under Chicago-based Hollinger International in the United States—as publisher of the Chicago Sun-Times newspaper and president and chief operating officer of Hollinger International.

Throughout his career, Radler cultivated a reputation for aggressive cost cutting in newspaper operations.

Radler has been publisher at major Western Canadian dailies such as The Province and The Vancouver Sun. Most recently, Radler was publisher at the Times Colonist until 2018.

== Mail fraud ==
After buying up the London Daily Telegraph, the Chicago Sun-Times, the Jerusalem Post, the Southam chain of Canadian newspapers and hundreds of small American newspapers, Hollinger International began to suffer from financial strain in the late 1990s. Radler and Black then sold off hundreds of their Canadian and American newspapers. Radler, who has lived in Vancouver, British Columbia, since the early 1970s, created a company called Horizon Publications Inc. This bought up some of the American newspapers owned by Hollinger International.

After controversy developed in 2003–2004 concerning $32,000,000 of 'non-compete' payments made to Black and Radler in the sale of Hollinger newspapers, the US Securities and Exchange Commission (and Canadian authorities as well) announced that Black and Radler were under investigation for their involvement.

Radler was eventually charged with five counts of mail fraud and two counts of wire fraud. On 20 September 2005, Radler pleaded guilty in a Chicago court to one count of mail fraud in relation to the 'non-compete' payments.

These payments had been diverted by Radler to a company controlled by himself and Black, Horizon Publications Inc. By disguising the payments as 'non-compete' payments, non-sales proceeds, Radler took advantage of a Canadian tax ruling that made them tax-exempt. The prosecution argued that these moneys belonged to Hollinger International, and had been improperly and secretly diverted to Black and Radler. Radler was sentenced to a fine of $250,000 and a term of 29 months in prison. He had been assisting the prosecution in the investigation of his former business partner. Black is currently being tried on the many charges; his trial began in Chicago in March 2007. Patrick Fitzgerald is the lead prosecutor in the Black case, and Black is represented by a legal team which includes Toronto lawyer Edward Greenspan.

In the fall of 2005, the Board of Trustees of Queen's University, Radler's alma mater, directed that Mr. Radler's name be immediately removed from the building wing of their business school that had been named after him, and his personal donation was returned. Subsequently, the university discovered that returning charitable gifts is impossible under Canada Revenue Agency regulations, which prevented the return of the donations from the various media companies. To make matters more complex, some of the companies themselves were no longer in operation, and others did not wish the gift returned in any case. While the board's ethical decision was rightly lauded, the complexities of the gift, and the uncertainty about the rules at the time, created lingering confusion. After careful consideration and in consultation with Osprey Media (which now owned many of the companies that had made the original donations), it was agreed that in spirit Queen's had returned the gift and Osprey had made an equivalent donation; Osprey is now recognised on the wall of the business school at the level of the donation. It was widely reported at the time that a Toronto hospital had no intention of returning Conrad Black's financial gift. This prompted some to question the wisdom of Queen's returning David Radler's generous donation. The business school, for its part, explained that the charge that Mr Radler had pleaded guilty to was "very serious" and not congruent with the values of the school and those it teaches.

On 18 March 2007, it was reported that Mr. Radler had signed a settlement with the US Securities and Exchange Commission that will see him pay a penalty of almost US$29 million and prevent him from acting as an officer or director of any public company in the United States. The next day, it was announced that Mr. Radler has settled with the Sun-Times Media Group, agreeing to pay them $64.1 million. The news of the SEC settlement sparked protest from the defence at the Conrad Black trial; the defence claimed that such news would negatively influence the jury.

Radler started serving his 29-month sentence for fraud on 25 February 2008 by reporting to Moshannon Valley Correctional Center in Pennsylvania. He was transferred to FCI Ray Brook in Upstate New York and was turned over to Canadian authorities on 18 September 2008. He was paroled from Ferndale Institution in Mission, British Columbia on 15 December 2008. He served only 10 months of a 29-month sentence. He was released on the grounds that he was unlikely to "commit an offence involving violence" before his sentence expired. The board said it was limited to considering only the matter of physical violence and could not consider the financial devastation caused by his crimes or the many victims of these crimes left in its wake.

Radler is now back at work in his office in Vancouver running his business, the Alberta Newspaper Group.
