= Burlington Public Library =

Burlington Public Library, Burlington Carnegie Library, or Burlington Carnegie Free Library, may refer to:

in Canada

- Burlington Public Library (Ontario)

in the United States

- Burlington Public Library (Burlington, Iowa), listed on the National Register of Historic Places in Des Moines County, Iowa
- Burlington Carnegie Free Library (Burlington, Kansas), listed on the National Register of Historic Places in Kansas
- Burlington Public Library (Burlington, Massachusetts)
- Burlington Carnegie Library (Burlington, Washington), listed on the National Register of Historic Places in Skagit County, Washington
