= Wallace McCutcheon (politician) =

Canadian lawyer, actuary and politician

The Honourable Malcolm Wallace McCutcheon PC CBE QC

Canadian Senator from Ontario
- In office August 9, 1962 – May 13, 1968
- Appointed by: John Diefenbaker

Personal details
- Born: May 18, 1906 London, Ontario, Canada
- Died: January 23, 1969 (aged 62)
- Party: Progressive Conservative
- Spouse: Eva Trow Borland (m. 1934)
- Cabinet: Minister without portfolio (1962-1963); Minister of Trade and Commerce (1963)

Malcolm Wallace McCutcheon, CBE PC QC (May 18, 1906 – January 23, 1969) was a Canadian lawyer, actuary and politician.

== Life and career ==
Wallace McCutcheon was born in London, Ontario. During World War II, he was a member of the Wartime Prices and Trade Board.

Together with Edward Plunkett Taylor and Colonel W. Eric Phillips, he was a founder of the Argus Corporation, an investment company that controlled a variety of businesses, including Massey Ferguson farm machinery and Dominion grocery stores.

He was appointed to the Senate of Canada on August 9, 1962, on the recommendation of Prime Minister John Diefenbaker. McCutcheon sat in the caucus of the Progressive Conservative Party of Canada and represented the senatorial division of Gormley, Ontario.

He served as a Minister without portfolio in Diefenbaker's government from his appointment to February 11, 1963, when he was promoted to Minister of Trade and Commerce. His promotion was generally regarded as a move to shore up support for the Progressive Conservatives among members of Canada's financial sector.

The Progressive Conservatives were defeated in the 1963 federal election, and the Diefenbaker government resigned on April 21, 1963. McCutcheon later supported Dalton Camp's efforts to call a leadership review and remove Diefenbaker as party leader.

McCutcheon provided financial support for the Progressive Conservative Party of British Columbia in the 1963 provincial election. He was also a fundraiser for the University of Toronto.

McCutcheon ran for the leadership of the PC Party at the 1967 leadership convention, placing sixth out of eleven candidate on the first ballot, and withdrawing from the race after the second ballot to endorse the eventual winner, Robert Stanfield.

McCutcheon ran as an unabashed "small-c conservative", i.e., a candidate of the party's right-wing. He had considerable support and financing from Bay Street, Toronto's financial district.

He campaigned aggressively against "big government" and "creeping socialism". He used dozens of attractive young women in his demonstration at the convention (dubbed "blonde goddesses" by the Toronto Star), and advocated a guaranteed annual income of $10,000 per adult as an alternative to the various social programs offered by different levels of government. He also advocated a "made-in-Canada" constitution to replace the British North America Acts and to guarantee the rights of Canadians, including language and cultural rights. He opposed public medicare.

He resigned from the Senate on May 13, 1968, in order to contest the 1968 federal election as the Progressive Conservative candidate in the Ontario riding of York—Simcoe. He placed second with 13,100 votes (37.3% of the vote), compared to 15,906 won by John Roberts.

McCutcheon died in 1969, at the age of 62.

== Archives ==
There is a Malcolm Wallace McCutcheon fonds at Library and Archives Canada.
