= Argus Corporation =

Defunct Canadian conglomerate

- Formerly: Canadian Industrial Shares Limited (September–November 1945)
- Company type: Holding company
- Founded: 24 September 1945
- Founder: E. P. Taylor; Colonel W. Eric Phillips; Wallace McCutcheon
- Defunct: 2008
- Headquarters: Toronto, Ontario

Argus Corporation Limited was an investment holding company based in Toronto, Ontario. During the 1960s and 1970s, it was the most powerful and best known conglomerate in Canada, at one time controlling the companies making up 10 percent of all shares traded daily on the Toronto Stock Exchange.

At its height in the 1970s, it was a true conglomerate with many unrelated businesses. Among these were Dominion grocery stores, Orange Crush soft drinks, Massey Ferguson farm machinery, Domtar wood products and Carling O'Keefe breweries.

The company was purchased by Conrad Black in 1978. Black and his associates sold off most of the Argus assets by 1985, and by 2005 Argus contained only one asset and was itself wholly owned by Black's Ravelston Corporation. Due to the fallout of ongoing lawsuits, Ravelston went bankrupt in 2008, and Argus disappeared.

== History ==
Argus was founded as an investment holding company in 1945 by E. P. Taylor with minority partners Colonel W. Eric Phillips, Wallace McCutcheon, Bud McDougald, and other less influential investors. The company was formed through Taylor's brewery empire, Canadian Breweries Limited, which was later known as Carling O'Keefe, and which Argus took control over. Argus was also set up with the support of the American Atlas Corporation, itself a holding company.

In 1958, Argus moved its headquarters to the prestigious location of 10 Toronto Street, where it stayed until its demise.

=== Rise ===
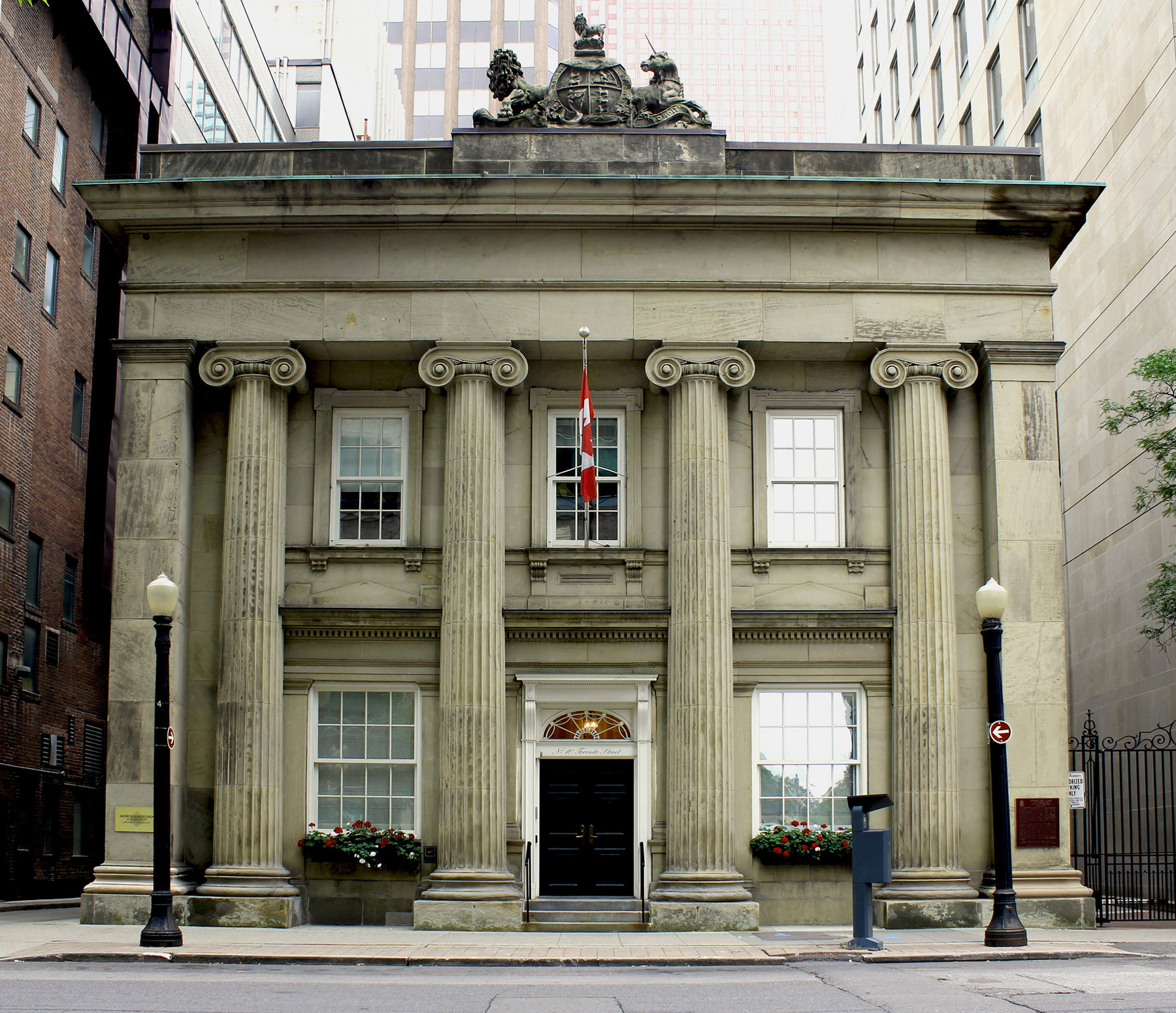
The company was headquartered in the 1852 Toronto Street Post Office

Argus was once one of Canada's most powerful conglomerates. By 1964, 10 percent of all shares traded on the Toronto Stock Exchange were controlled by Argus. In 1969, E.P. Taylor appointed McDougald to run operations. In the 1970s, it controlled large companies including Canadian Breweries Limited, Dominion Stores, Hollinger Mines, Crown Trust, Domtar, Standard Broadcasting and Massey Ferguson, as well as at some point or other having control or significant shareholdings in other Canadian companies such as Dominion Malting Co., Orange Crush Ltd., British Columbia Forest Products Limited and the St. Lawrence Corporation, a wood pulp processor.

The company's importance was so great that when Paul Desmarais of the Power Corporation of Canada attempted, but later failed, to acquire Argus, the federal government of Pierre Elliot Trudeau responded by creating the Royal Commission on Corporate Concentration in 1975, which is held to be a token of the influence of the Desmarais clan over the affairs of the nation.

=== Conrad Black ===
Shortly after the death of McDougald in 1978, his widow and her sister sold their shares to Conrad Black while the widows were under the influence of what The Globe and Mail called "slow-witted advisers". The transaction led to a high-profile falling out between the families. The move gave Black effective voting control and he became president of the corporation. The move also was financially lucrative for Black - his net worth grew to an estimated $50 million in 1978. Black and his associates sold off most of the assets by 1985, and used the money to invest in media properties. In 2005, Argus's only asset was the Toronto-based holding company Hollinger Inc. Argus itself was 100 percent controlled by Ravelston Corporation—itself a holding company controlled until 2005 by Black and his long-time associate David Radler. The company went into receivership along with Ravelston in 2005 due to the legal troubles of its chairman, and eventually went bankrupt in 2008 while Black was in prison.

== Notable assets ==
A list of assets once owned by Argus included:

- Canadian Breweries Limited - renamed Carling O'Keefe; sold to Elders Limited and merged within Molsons; now Molson Coors Brewing Company
- Dominion Stores - sold to A&P and now renamed Metro when A&P Canadian operations were sold to Metro Inc.
- Hollinger Mines - renamed Hollinger Argus Limited in 1978 and again as Hollinger Inc. (in 1985)
- Crown Trust - collapsed 1983
- Domtar - merged with Weyerhaeuser to form US company of the same name
- Standard Broadcasting - sold to Slaight Communications and re-sold to Astral Media
- Massey Ferguson - reorganized as Varity and re-emerged as Massey Combines; name acquired by AGCO
- Dominion Malting Co. - acquired by International Malting Company Limited and operated as IMC of Canada Limited; later acquired by ADM Malting (a division of Archer Daniels Midland); now part of Malteurop North American operations
- Orange Crush Ltd. - sold by Cadbury plc in Canada and owned by Dr Pepper Snapple Group
- British Columbia Forest Products Limited - sold to Fletcher Challenge and later acquired by Norske Skog; renamed Catalyst Paper; sold by Norske Skog as Catalyst

== Chairmen of the Board of Directors ==
- William Eric Phillips 1945–1964
- E. P. Taylor 1969–1971
- John A. McDougald 1971–1978
- Maxwell Meighen 1978–1978
- Nelson M. Davis 1978–1979
- Conrad Black 1979-2008
