= University of Toronto Ajax Division =

Former satellite campus of the University of Toronto, Canada

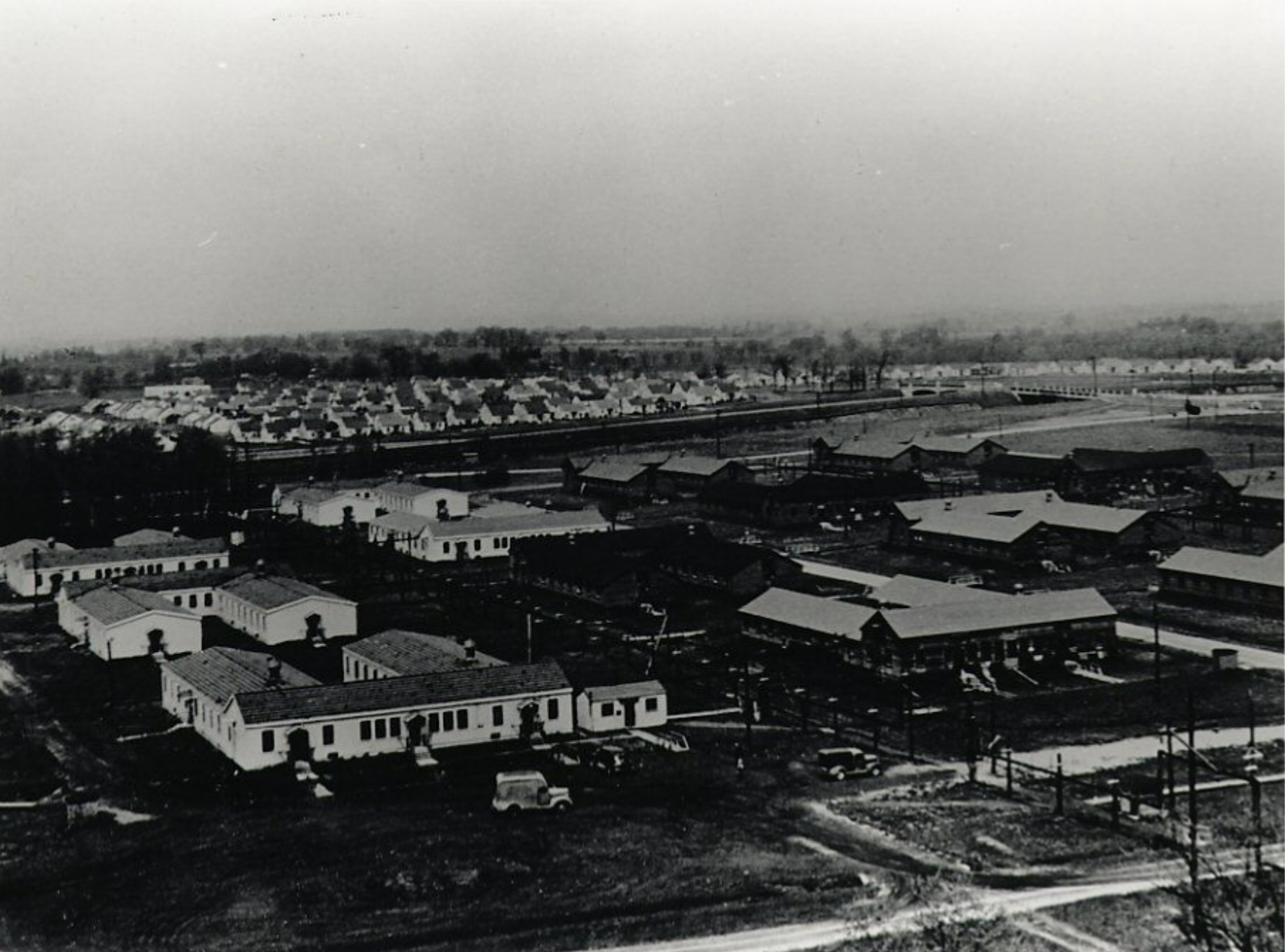
- Aerial photograph of the Ajax campus
- Active: January 1946–April 1949
- Parent institution: University of Toronto
- Chairman: William Eric Phillips
- Dean: Clarence Richard Young
- Director: Roy Gilley
- Total staff: 210 (1946–47)
- Students: 3,312 (1946–47)
- Location: Former DIL plant, Ajax, Pickering Township, Ontario, Canada; 43.844°N 79.018°W
- Campus: 428 acres (1.73 km^{2}); Suburban
- Location in southern Ontario

The Ajax Division was a satellite campus of the University of Toronto in Ajax, an unincorporated community (now a town) within the Pickering Township of Ontario, Canada. It was located at the site of the defunct Defence Industries Limited Pickering Works munitions plant, which was leased by the federal government to the university for a nominal rent.

The Ajax Division was set up to meet the increasing demand for engineering education from World War II veterans returning from the war theatre in Europe. The university's St. George campus accommodated 400 veterans who had completed at least 29 months of active service; the Ajax campus accommodated the rest of the engineering and architecture students, both veterans and non-veterans.

The campus was active between January 1946 and April 1949, with approximately 6,000 students attending classes there. At its peak, during 1946–47, it had 3,312 students and 210 instructors. By 1949, the university had built new engineering facilities in downtown Toronto, and decided to move the classes back to Toronto, declining the government's offer to buy the Ajax site for cheap.

== Background ==
After the end of World War I in 1918, Canada had seen high unemployment among the war veterans. Towards the end of World War II, the Government of Canada sought to avoid a repeat of this situation, and encouraged veterans to enroll in educational courses and be job-ready, by paying for their education. As a result, a large number of veterans enrolled at the University of Toronto, straining its resources. The university had 7,265 registrations in the autumn of 1944; by 1946, this number had increased to 17,060, out of which 9,700 were veterans.

The university administration had anticipated a substantial increase in number of students even before the end of the war, as noted in the outgoing President Henry John Cody's June 1945 report to the university's Board of Governors. Initially, the university dealt with the lack of enough classrooms by holding classes in Convocation Hall, several temporary structures, a bookstore, a church, the Hart House Theatre, and nearby houses, including professors' homes.

The need for additional space was especially acute for engineering, which was very popular with veterans. For example, half of the 1,000 air force personnel discharged in the first quarter of 1945 opted for engineering. The university's St. George (downtown) campus did not have enough space to accommodate the increasing number of engineering students. In 1945, the university's Committee on Policy proposed a limit on the student intake for the Faculty of Applied Science and Engineering. According to the proposal, only 400 out of the 1000 applicants would be admitted, and the first year classes would be reserved for veterans; the applicants who were fresh out of high school would have to wait another year before starting their classes. This led to a bitter controversy, with critics of the proposal insisting on admitting an equal number of veterans and non-veterans, while President-designate Sidney Smith insisted that veterans be given preference.

To resolve this controversy, the university decided to increase capacity by establishing an off-campus site, and admitting both veterans and non-veterans. Around 400 veterans, who had completed at least 29 months of active service, would be admitted to the fall session of 1945, in the university's downtown Toronto campus. The remaining students, both veteran and non-veteran, would start classes at the off-campus site four months later, in January 1946.

== Search for the off-campus facility ==
The university started searching for an off-campus site in mid-1945. It considered several options, and attempted to procure the Eglinton Hunt Club site, which had been purchased by the federal government at the start of the war. However, the Royal Canadian Air Force (RCAF), which had been using the site during the war, wanted to retain it.

The Executive Committee of the university's Board of Governors then considered the possibility of using the site of the Defence Industries Limited (DIL) munitions plant, in the Pickering Township east of Toronto. The plant had recently ceased production, when the demand for munitions dropped towards the end of the war. Ajax, the community that had developed around the plant, had several facilities for DIL workers that could be re-purposed for the university students.

William Eric Phillips, the chairman of the university's Board of Governors, organized a meeting on June 9, 1945 to discuss the government assistance required to set up the off-campus site. George Drew, the Premier of Ontario, agreed that his government would bear the capital and additional operating costs for the Ajax campus. By the third week of June 1945, C. D. Howe, the federal Minister for Reconstruction, agreed to lease the Ajax site to the University of Toronto for a nominal rent.

Without Howe's knowledge, Prime Minister William Lyon Mackenzie King had promised the DIL Ajax site to the RCAF as a depot for storing surplus planes. Meanwhile, Phillips made arrangements to develop plans for the conversion of the Ajax site into a university campus, and left Toronto to spend a month in England. When he returned, Howe informed him about the Prime Minister's decision, and advised the university to find another site.

An angry Phillips declared that it was impossible for the university to find an alternative site in a short time, and reminded him that the RCAF had already been given the Eglinton Hunt Club site over the university. Phillips and Board member Henry Borden met the Prime Minister in Ottawa, and argued that it was easier for the RCAF to find another site for storing planes than it was for the university to make alternative arrangements. Mackenzie King, an alumnus of the university, agreed to allow the university to use the Ajax site.

== Ajax campus ==
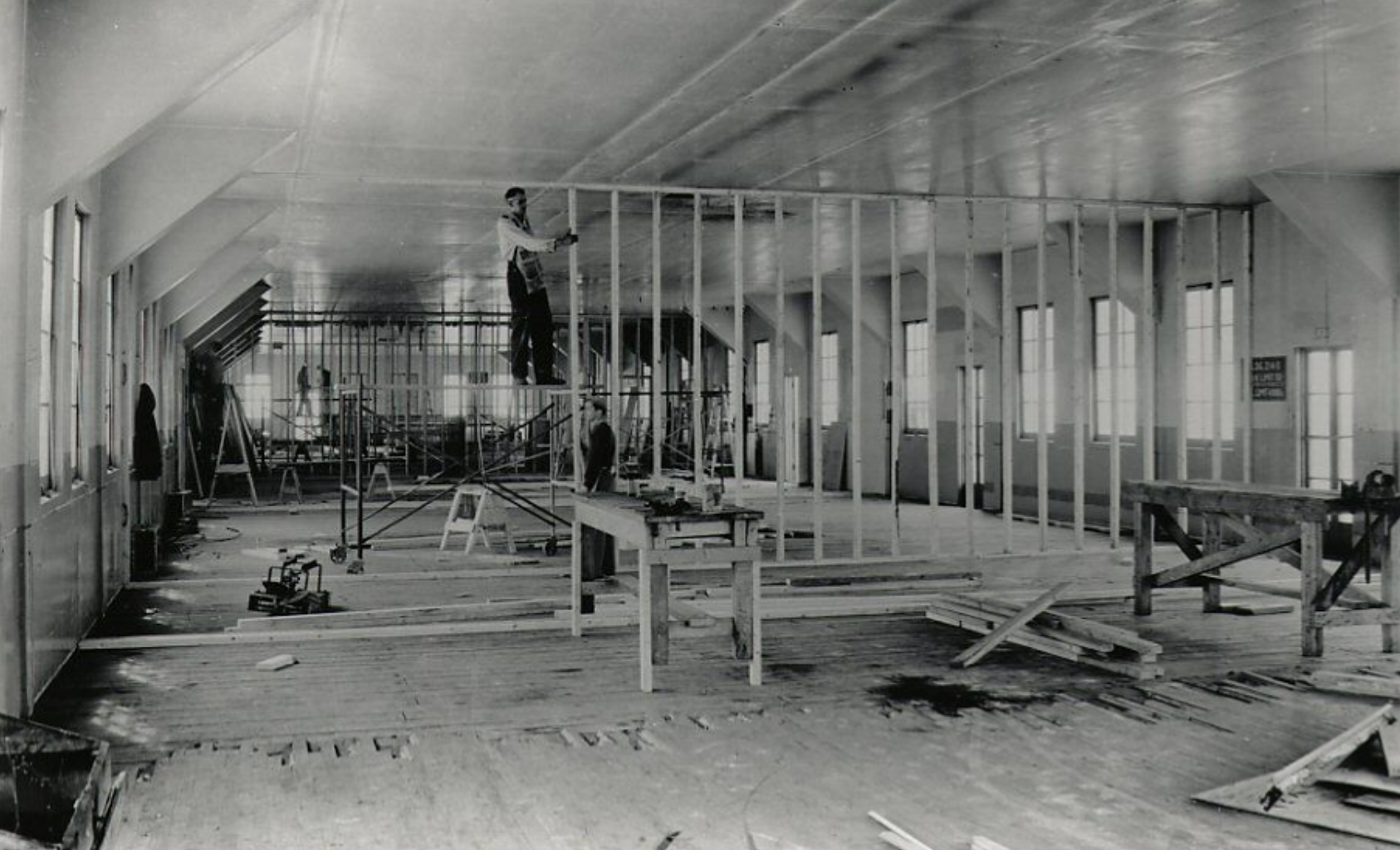
Adaption of DIL buildings for the university

In September 1945, the university's Board of Governors appointed a special committee for setting up the Ajax campus. The committee members included the university's president, its chairman of the board, its chancellor, Dean Young, A.D. LePan, its superintendent of buildings, Henry Borden and Roy Gilley. The director of the Ajax division was Roy Gilley, an engineer and a World War I veteran.

Alex Russell, who had served a DIL personnel manager during 1940–1945, oversaw the preparation of the Ajax facilities for the students. Several buildings were given to the university, including a hospital with 36 beds, dormitories with capacity to house 3,000 people, a cafeteria with seats for 1,000 people, a recreational center with bowling alleys, a theatre, and a lounge. The 428-acre Ajax campus, which had 111 buildings, was four times as large as the university's St. George campus. Over the next few months, Russell's team converted the munitions plant buildings into a university campus suitable for holding classes. They demolished the powder-contaminated buildings that were a fire hazard. By 1946, classrooms, laboratories, administrative offices, student residences, and a circulating library had been set up. A student activity centre called "Hart House" after the Toronto centre was also established. The university assumed responsibility for the operation of water supply, sewage disposal, road repair, postal service and fire protection.

Campus facilities

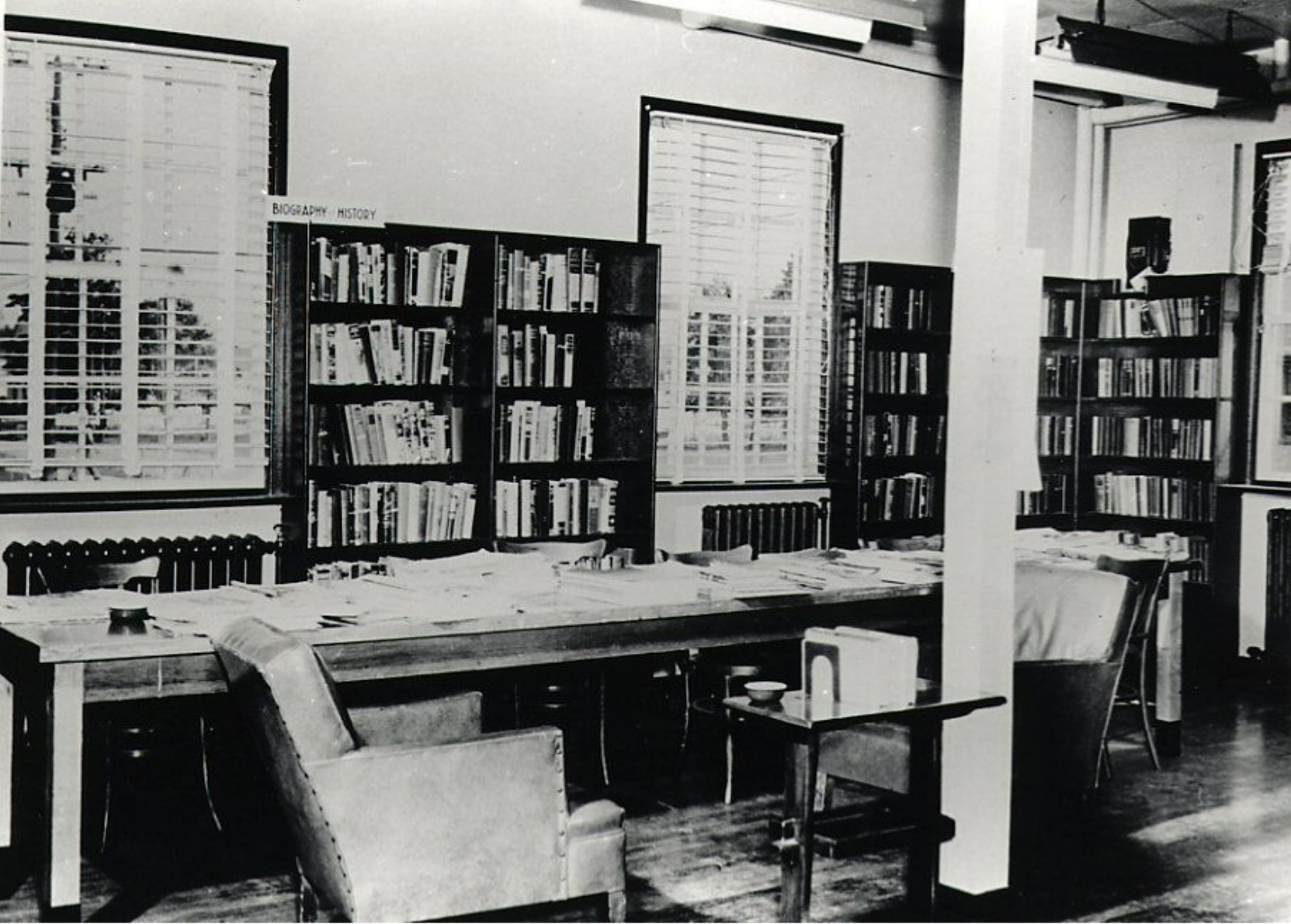
Library

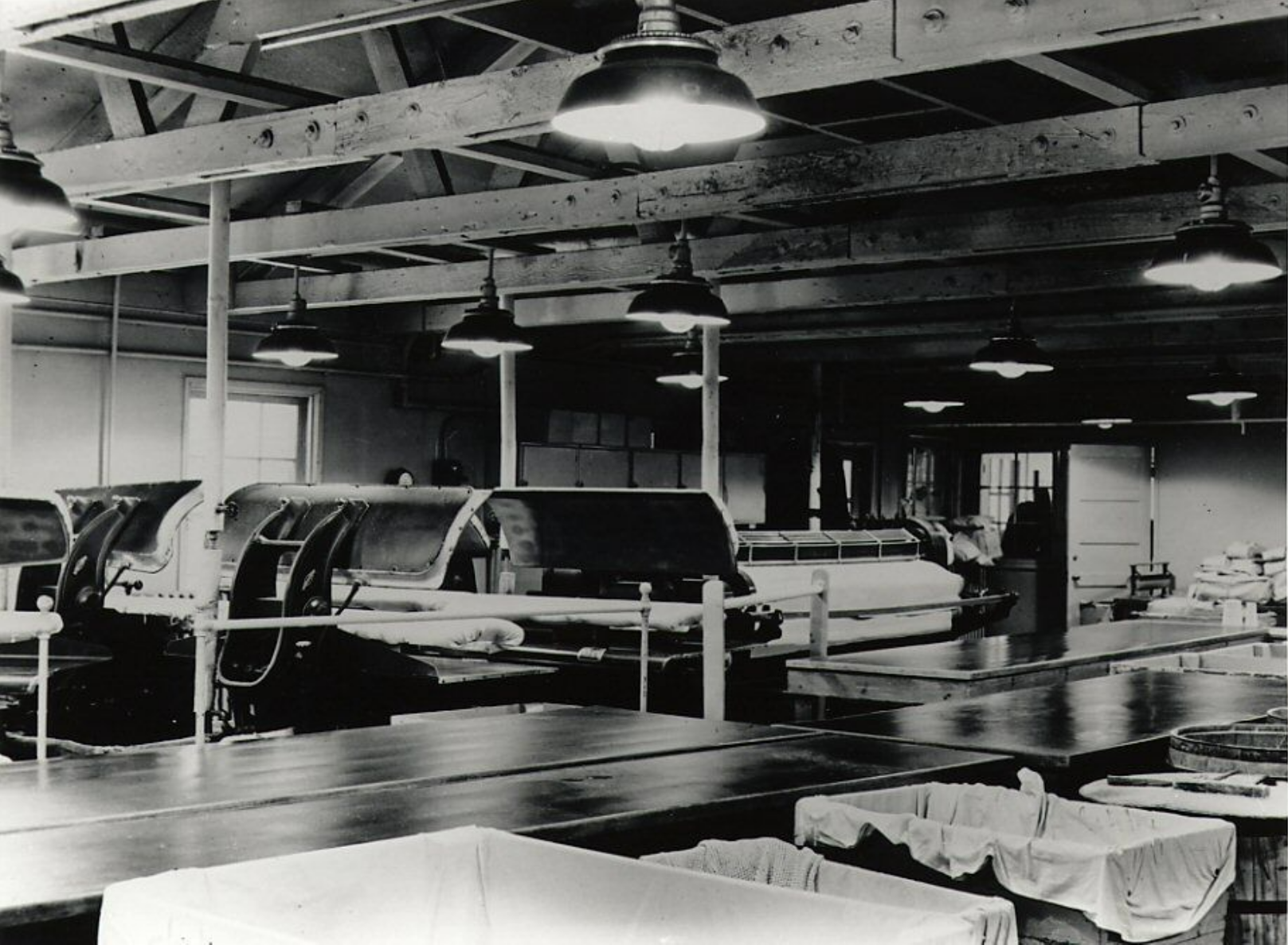
Laundry room

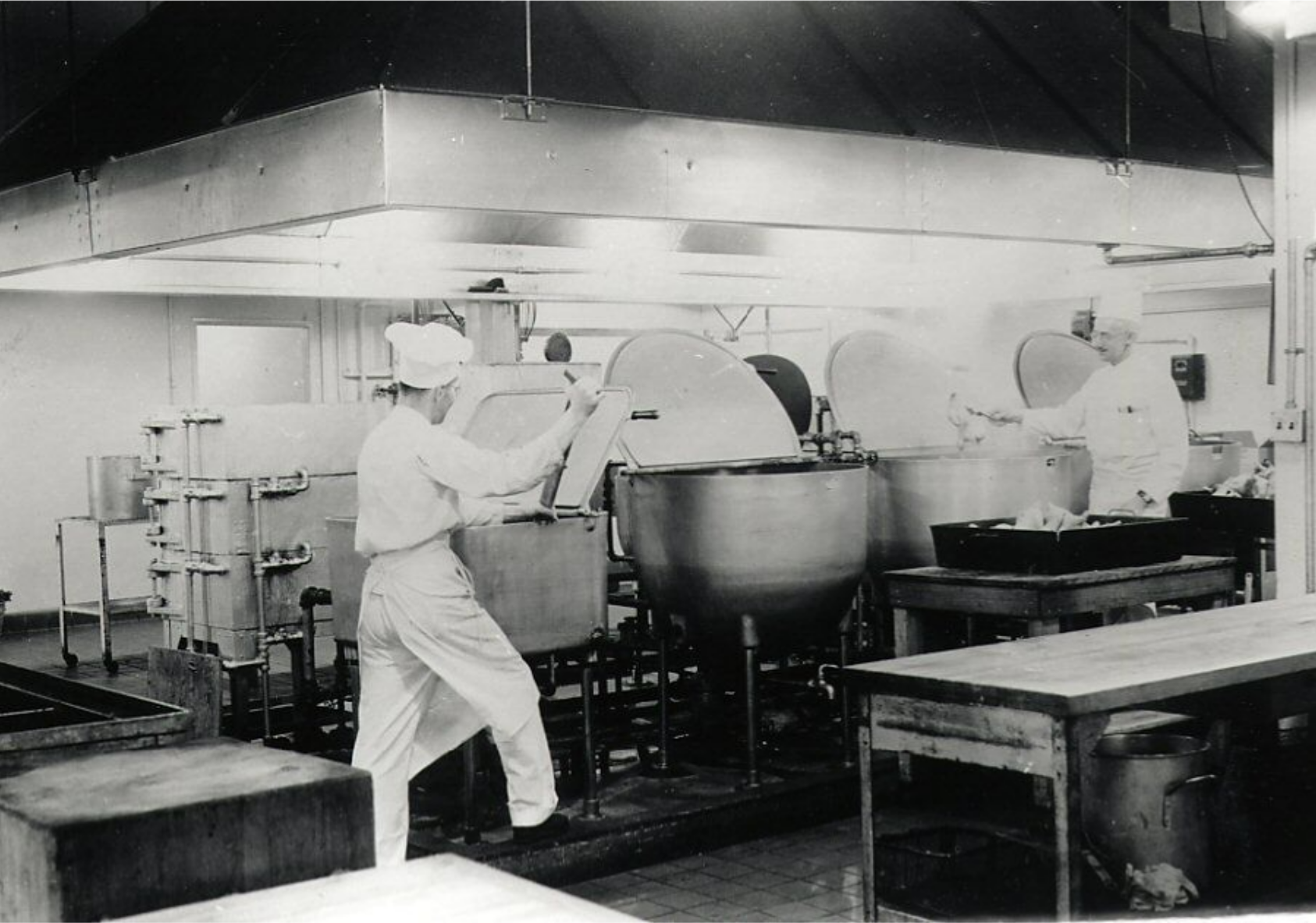
Kitchen

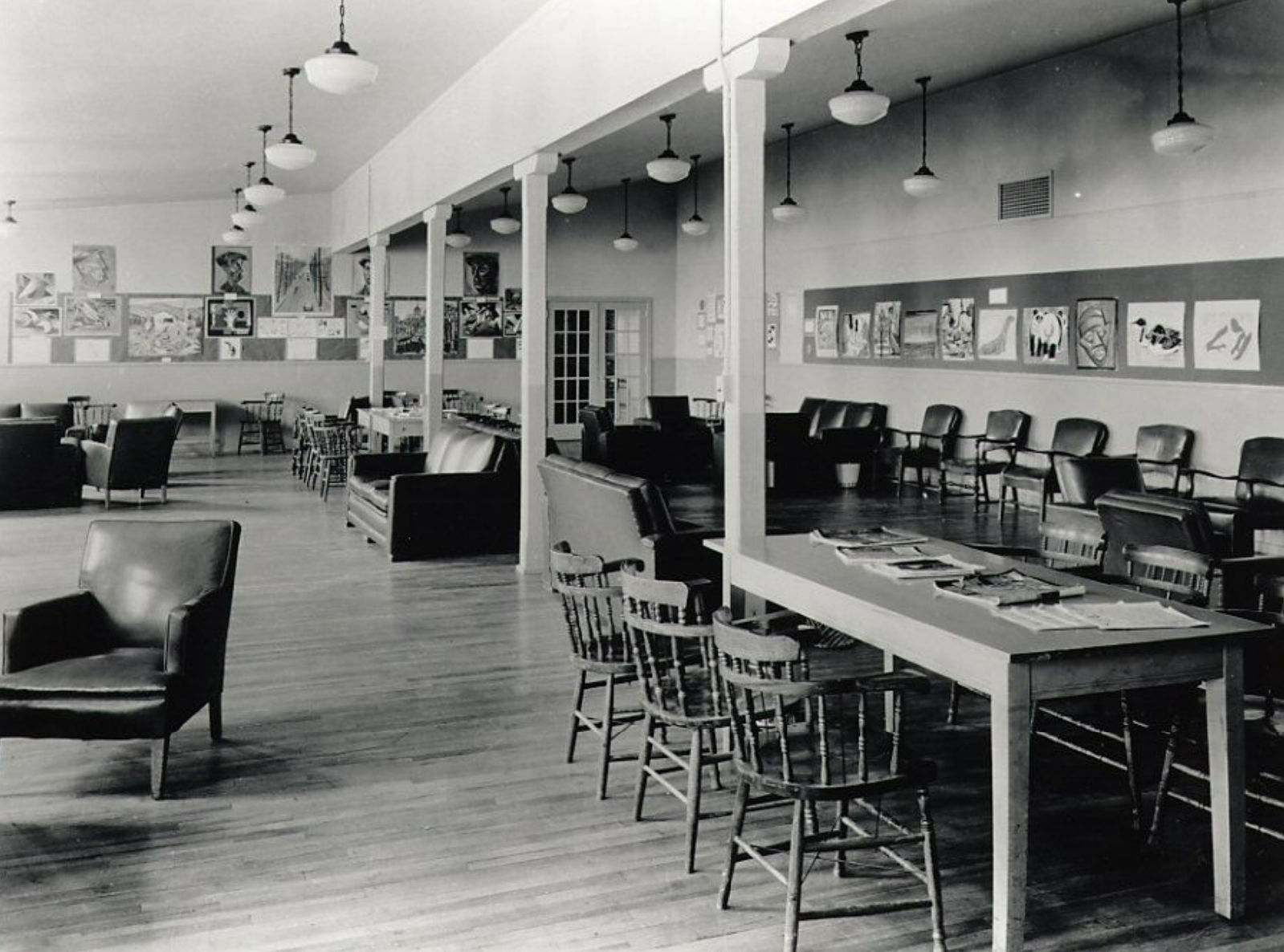
Hart House

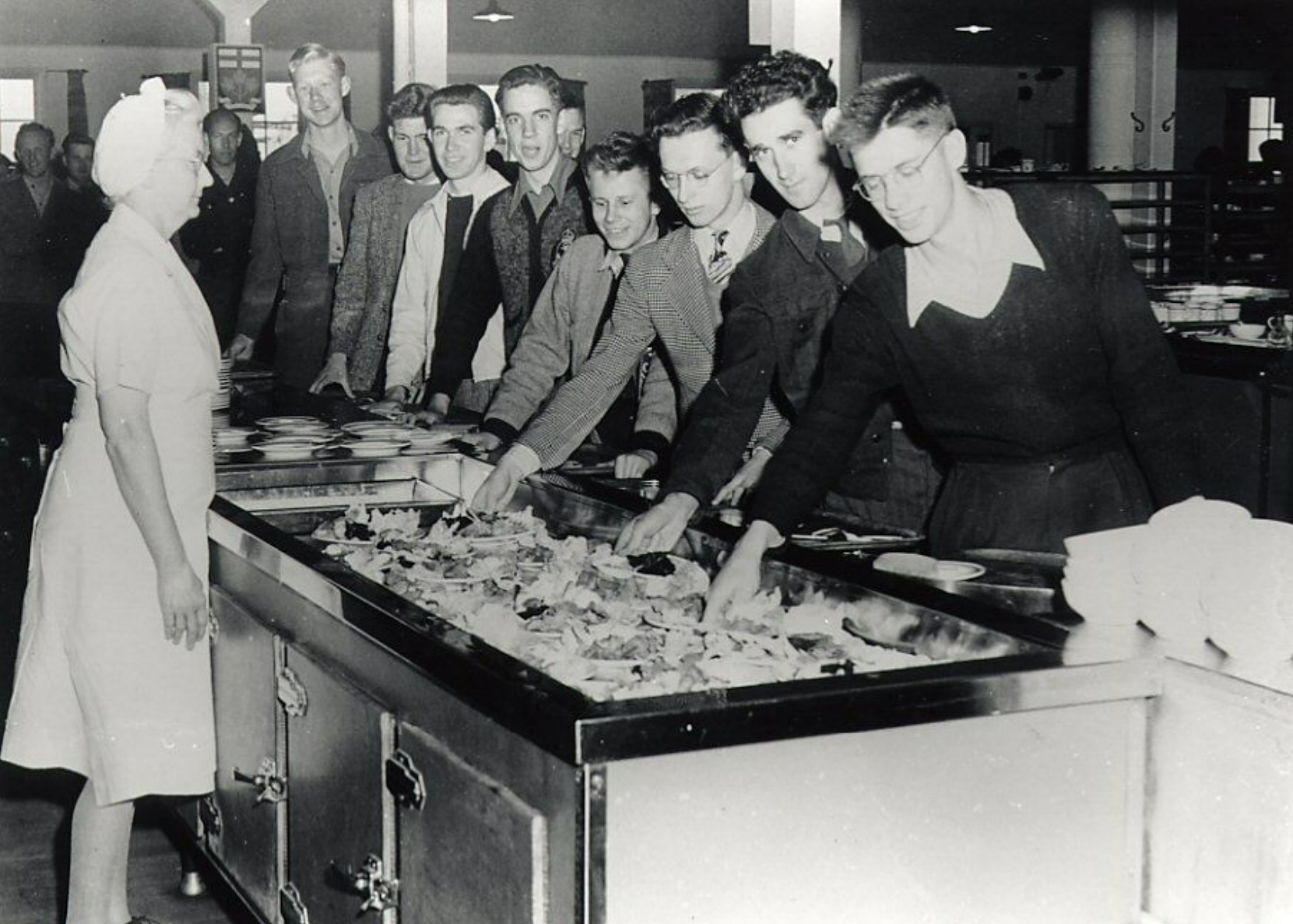
Cafetaria

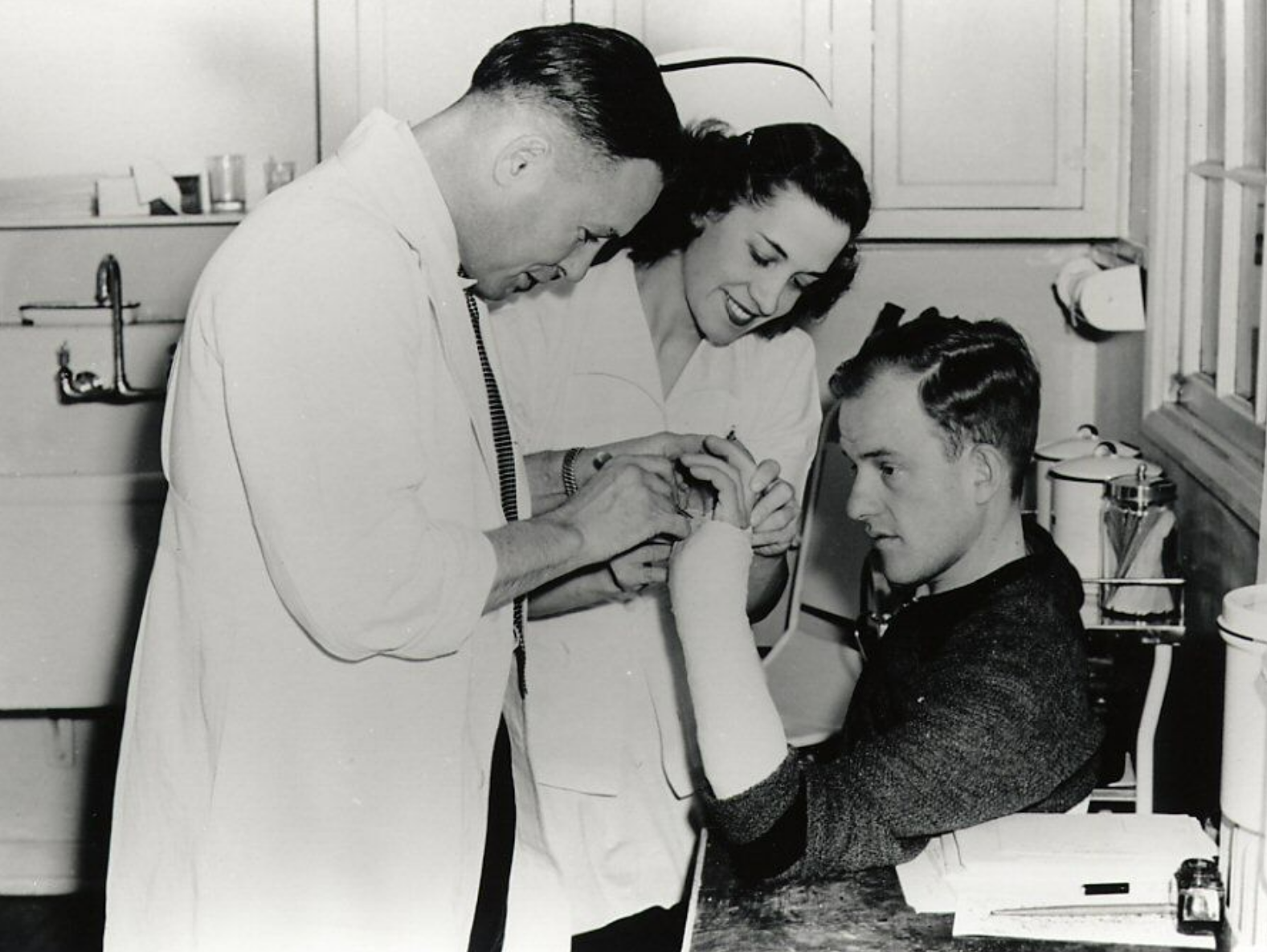
Doctor's office

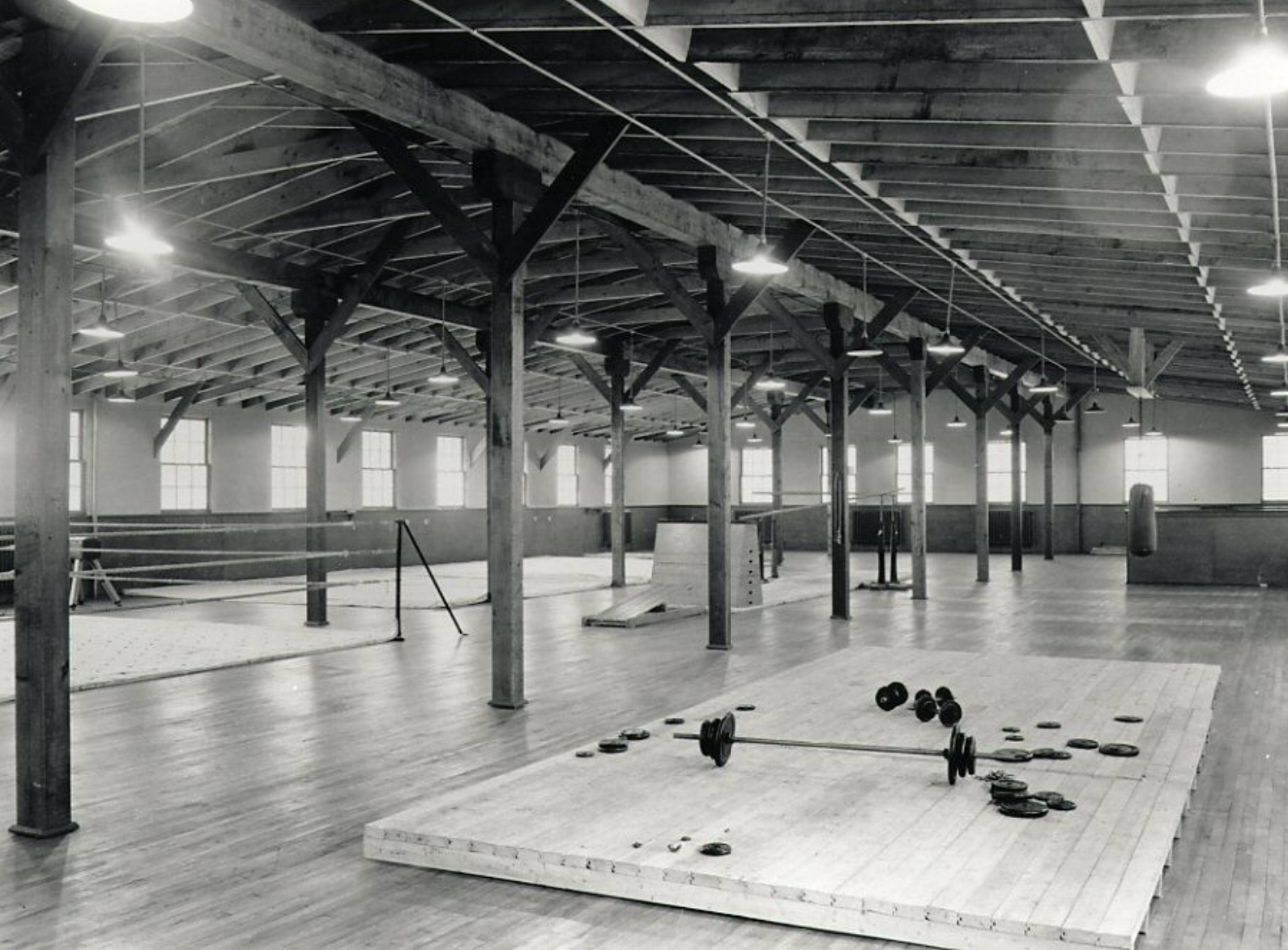
Weight room

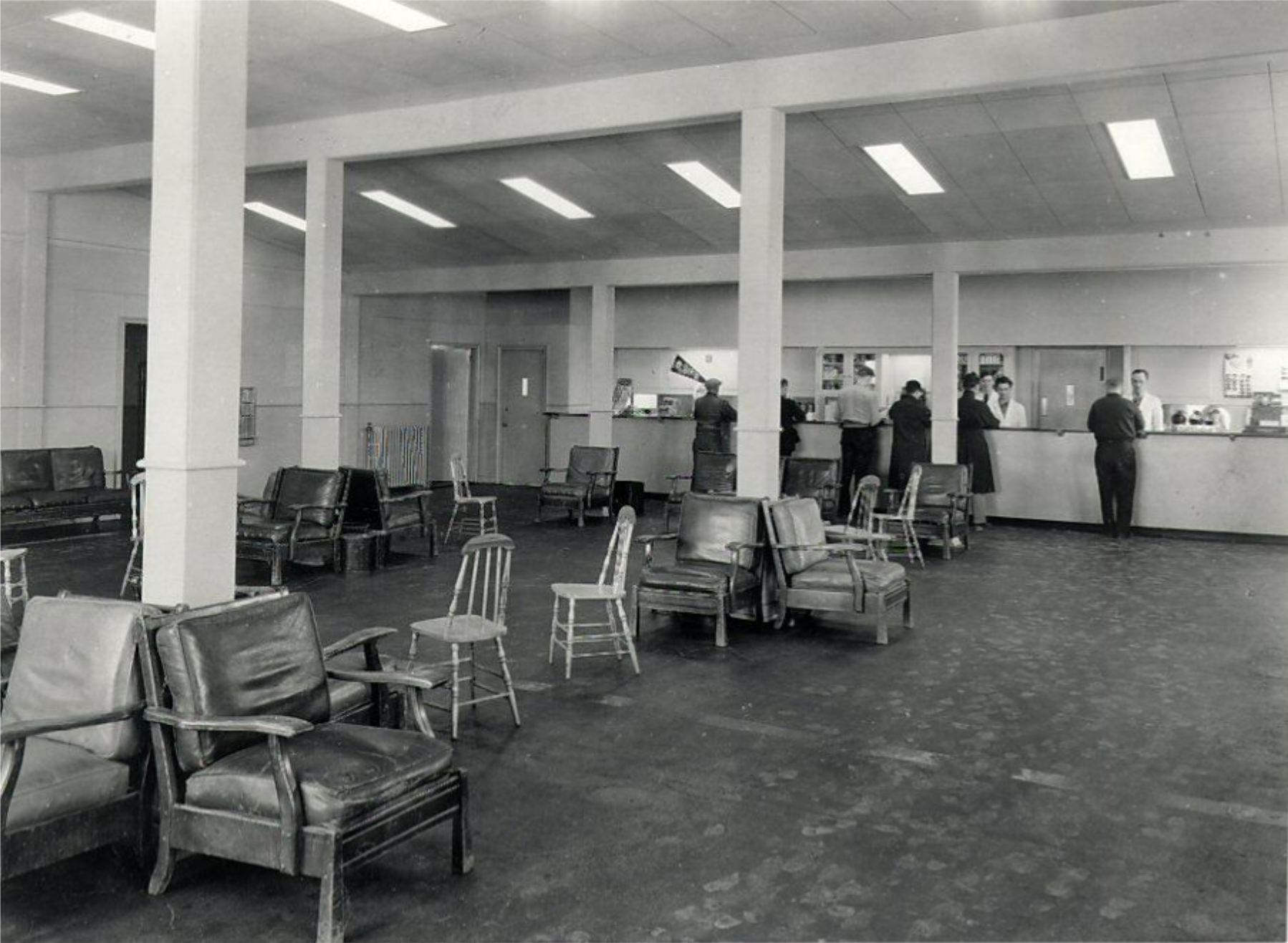
Tuck shop

The first classes at the Ajax campus began on January 14, 1946. Within a year, over 3,000 first and second year students were studying engineering at Ajax.

Classrooms and labs

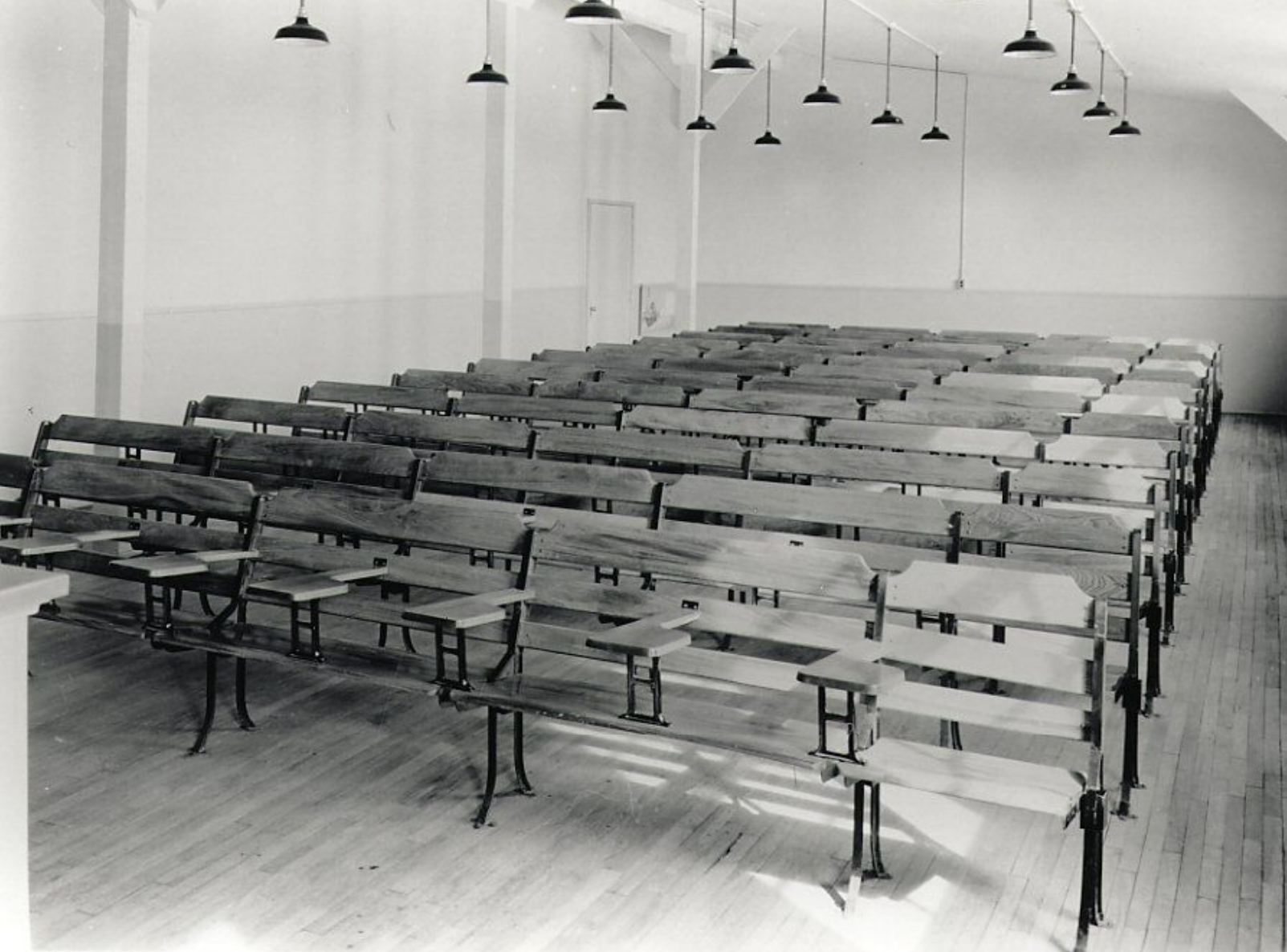
Classroom

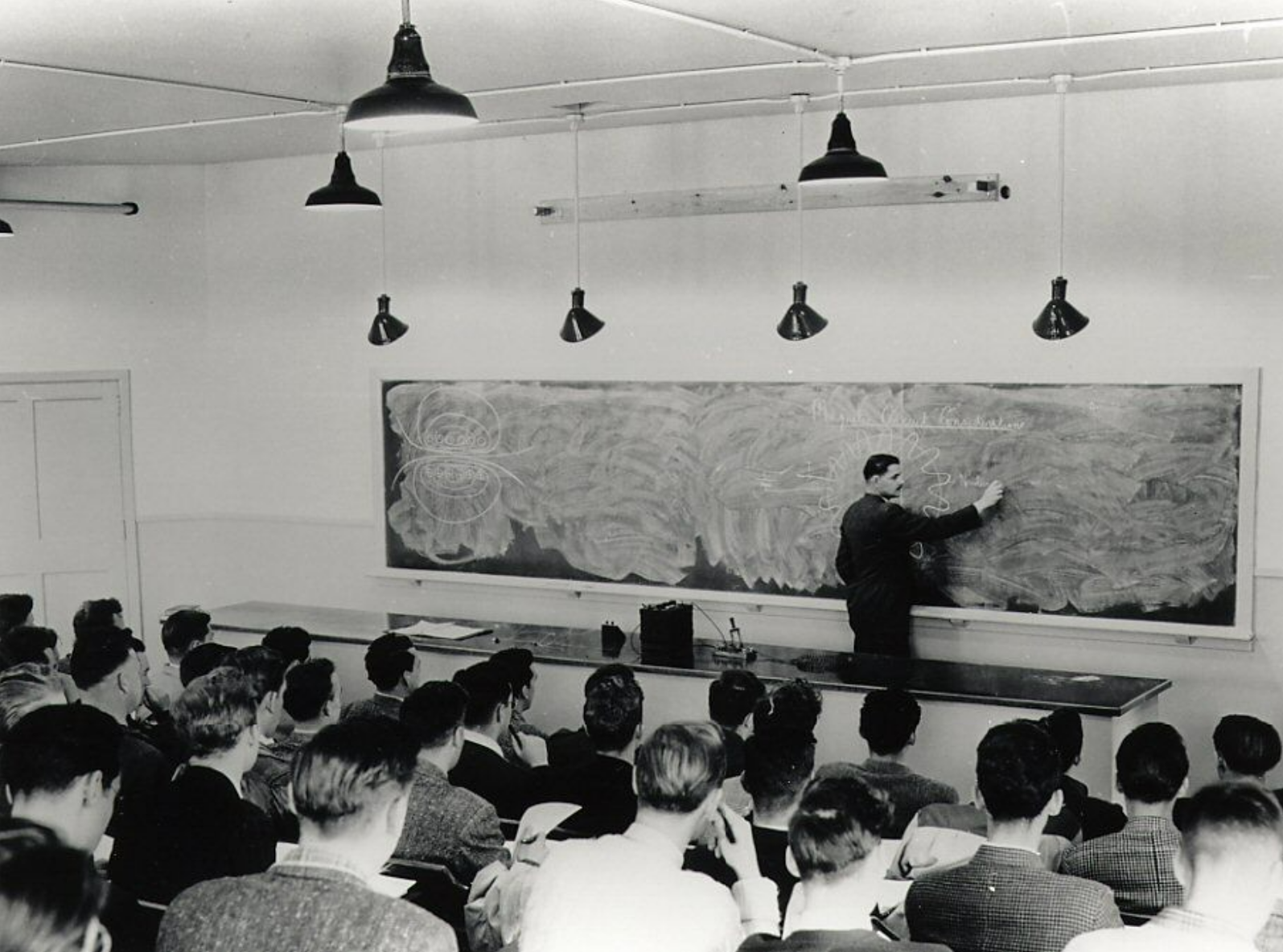
Classroom

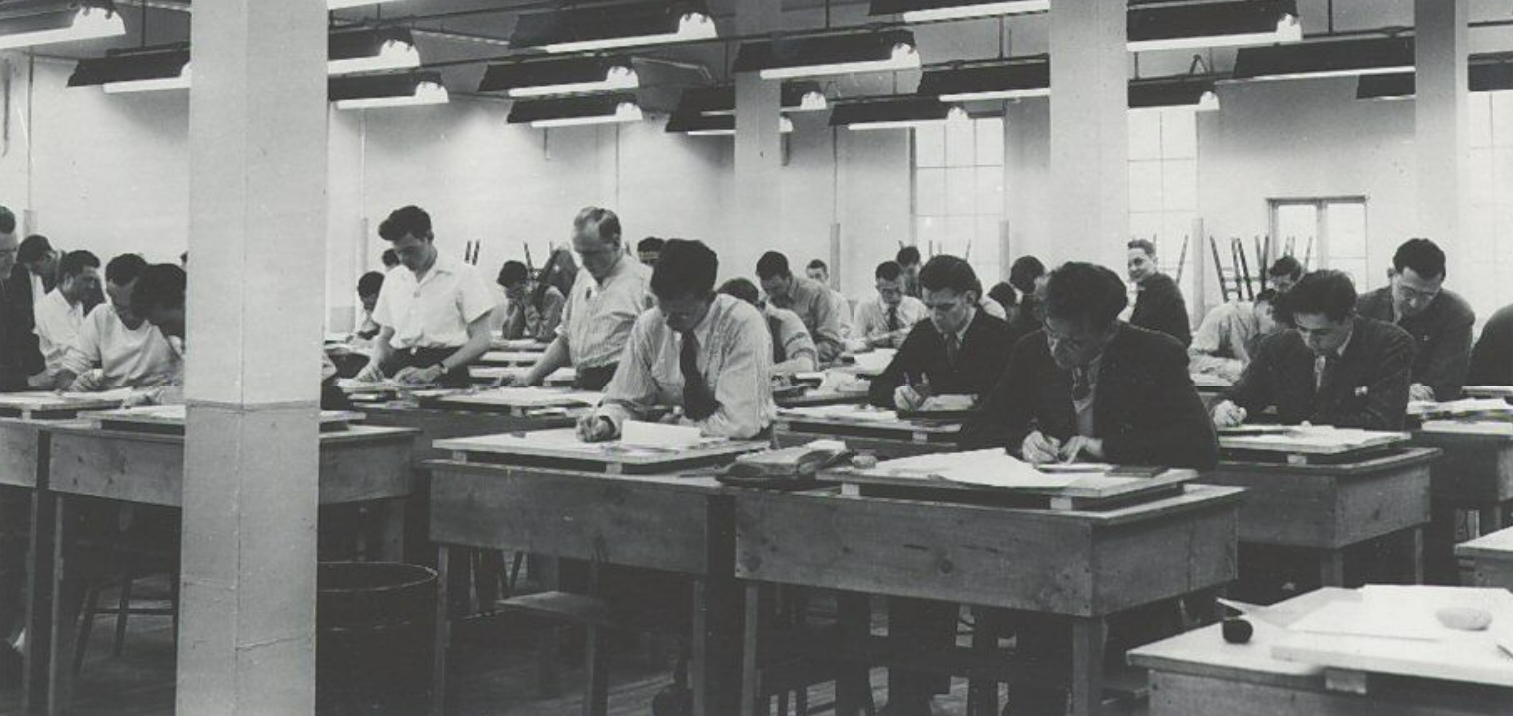
Classroom

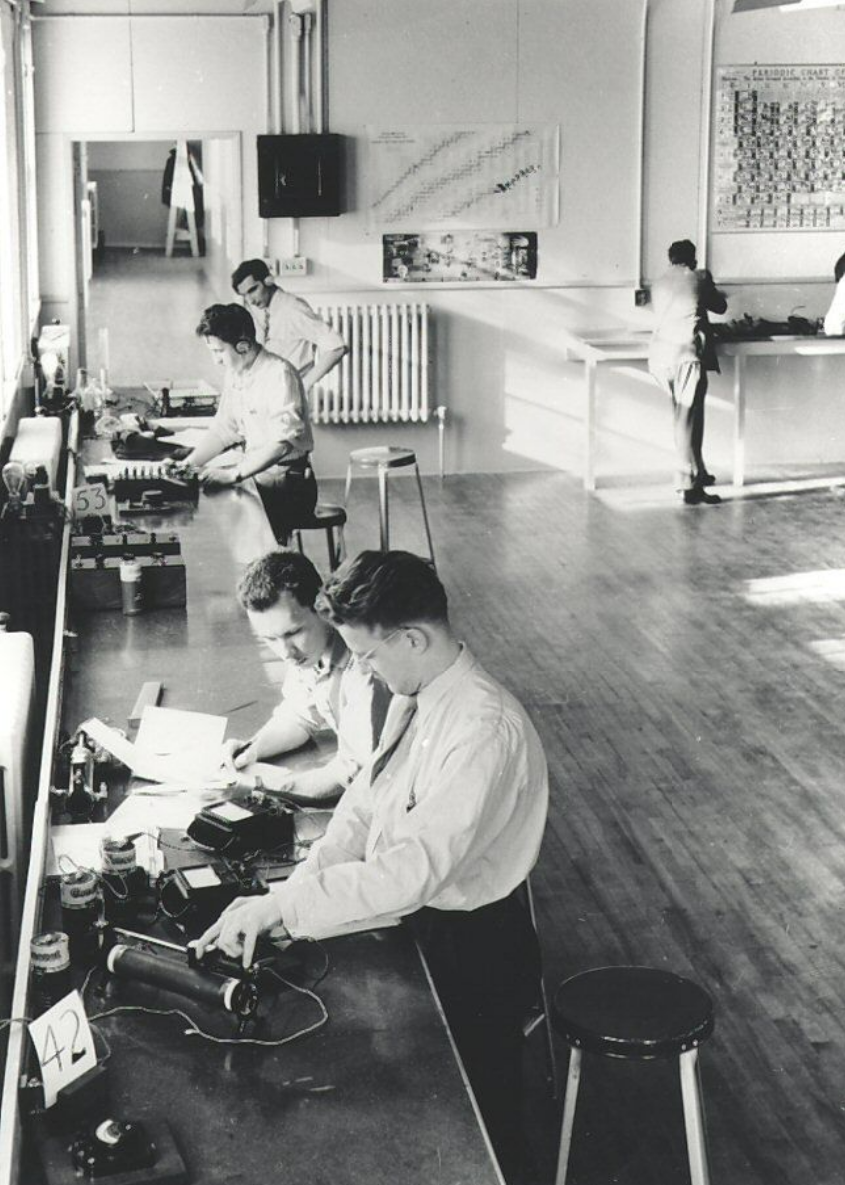
Physics lab

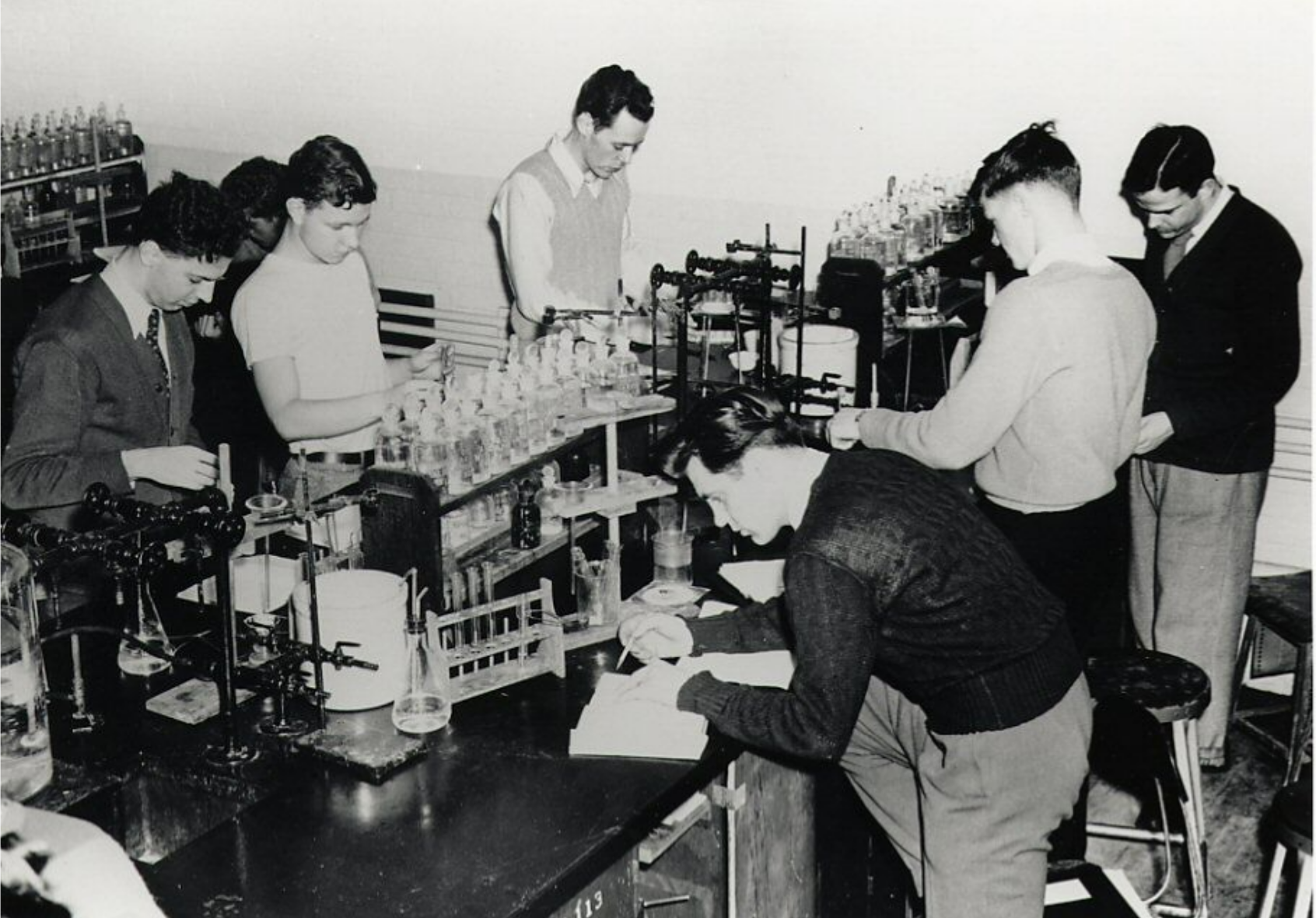
Chemistry lab

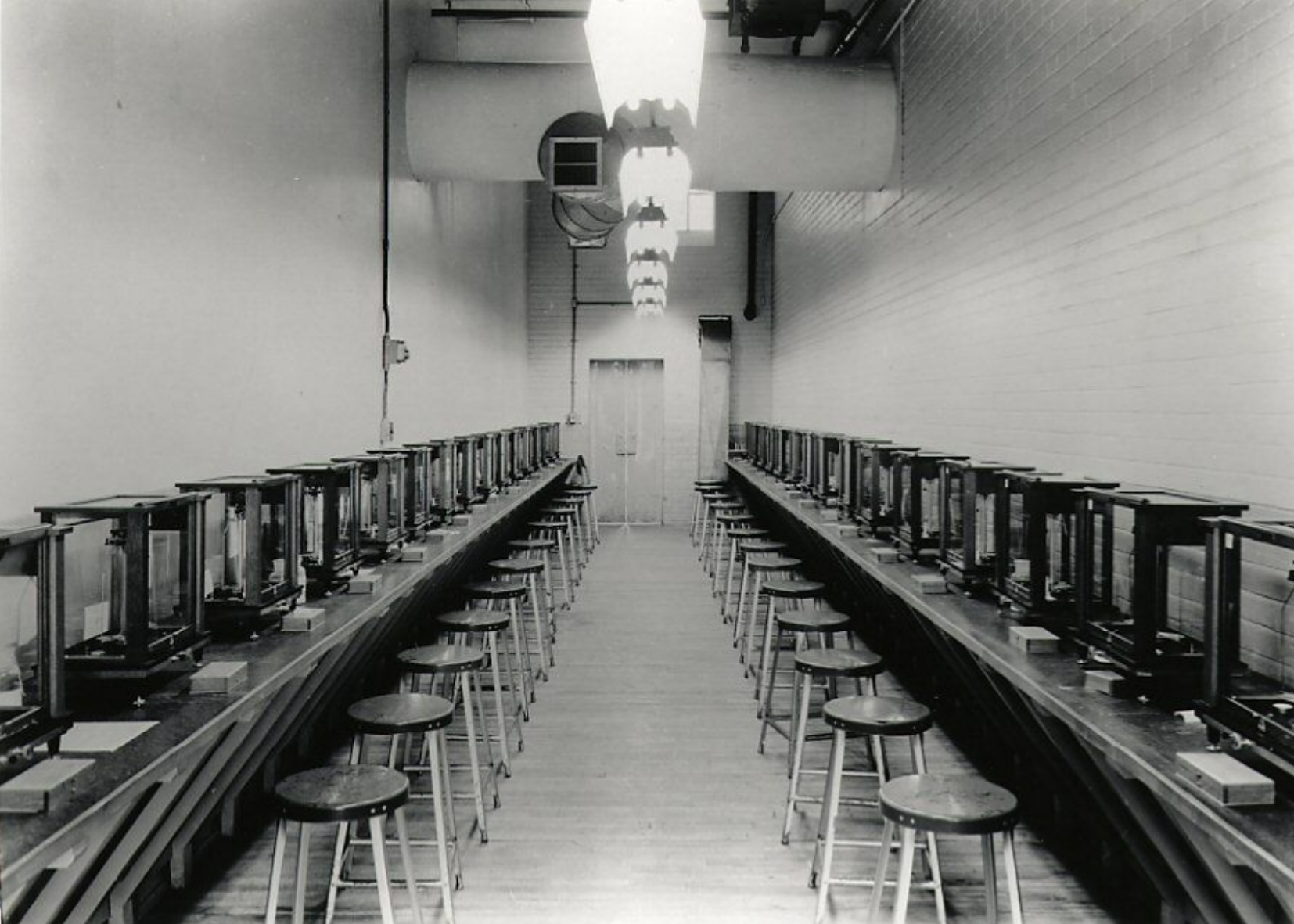
Lab

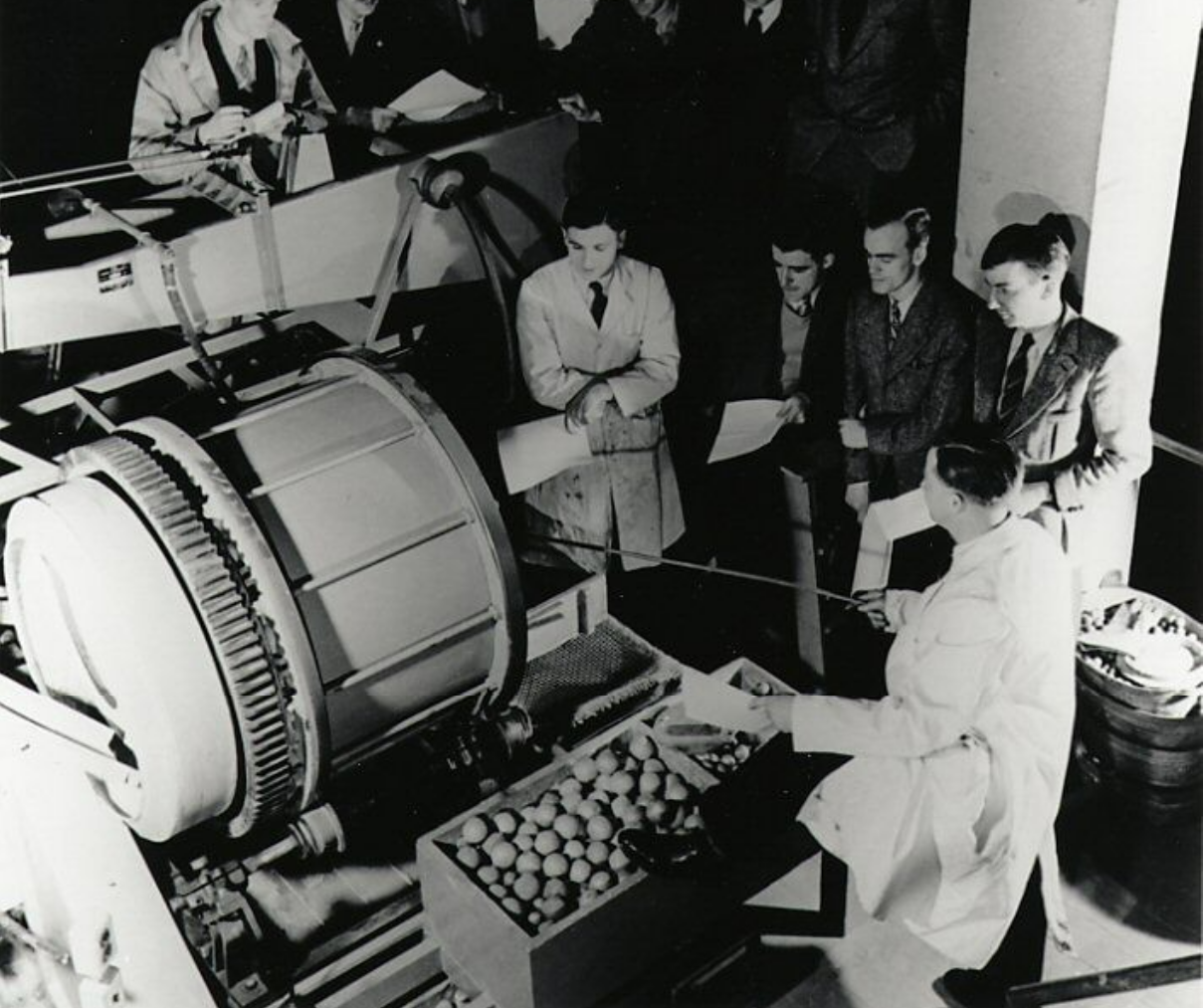
Lab experiment

Each dormitory room accommodated two single veterans. The room and boarding fees for the first session (January–August 1946) was $270. Married veterans who wanted to live with their family could rent the houses built by Wartime Housing Limited for the plant workers, but the supply of such houses was limited.

For those who commuted from Toronto, the Toronto Transportation Commission provided morning and evening bus service between Ajax and the Gray Coach Terminal (Bay and Dundas) in Toronto. The DIL buildings had been constructed far from each other to minimize damage from explosions, so the students found it inconvenient to walk in the campus. To solve this problem, a fleet of trailers, called the "Green Dragon" provided intra-campus transit service. Students described these trailers as overcrowded and uncomfortable, but also amusing.

Student life

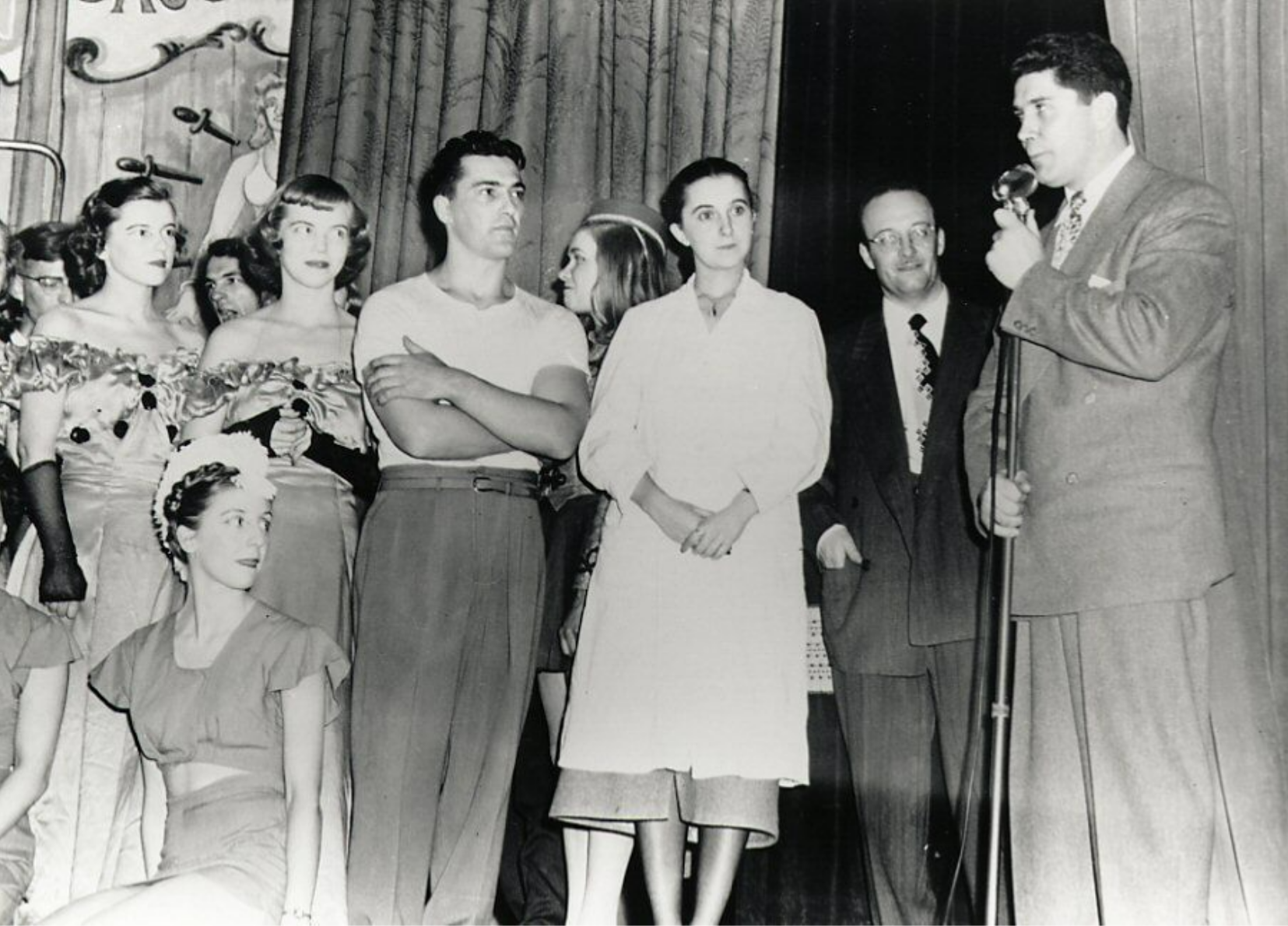
Student's show

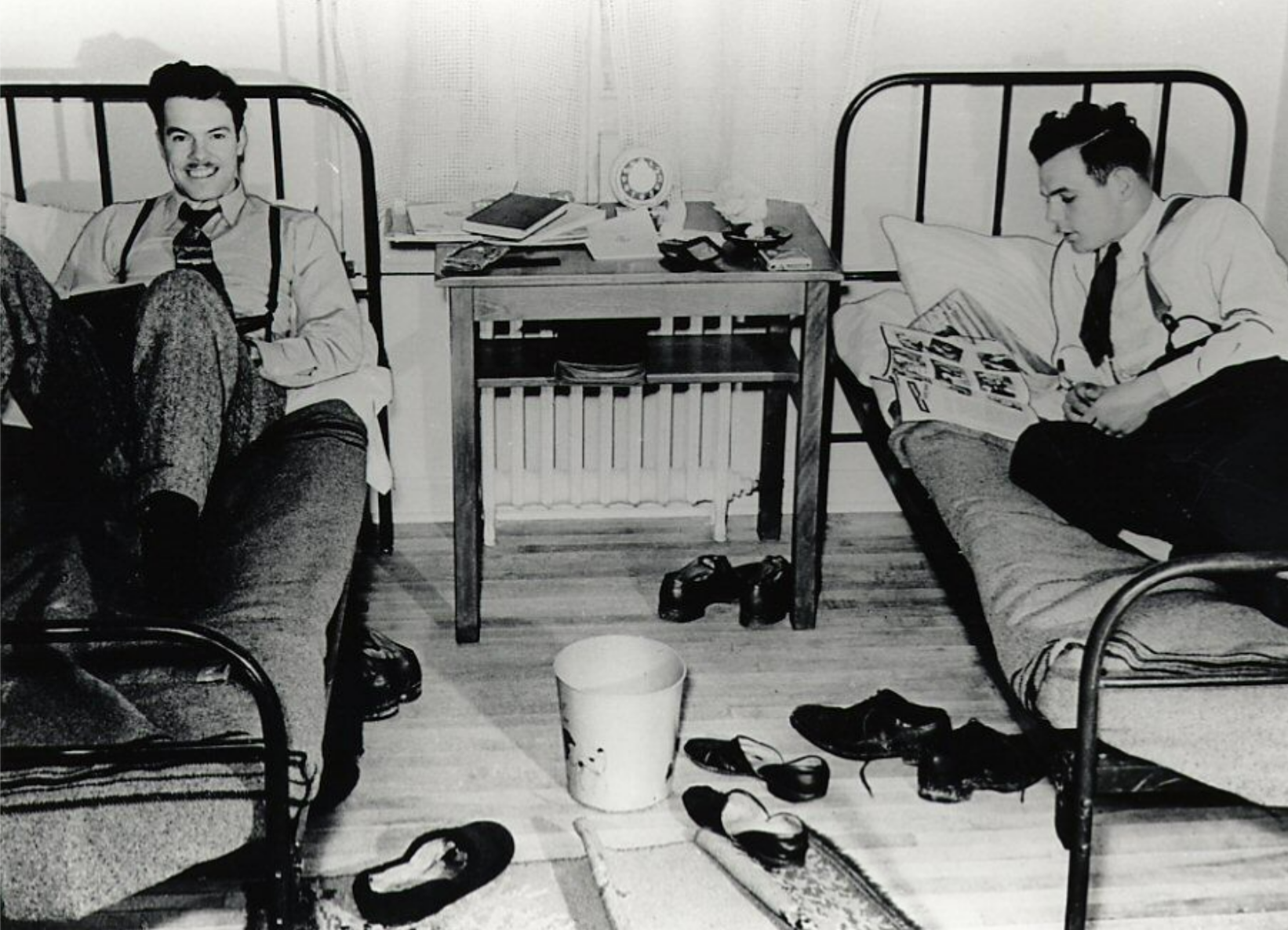
Residence

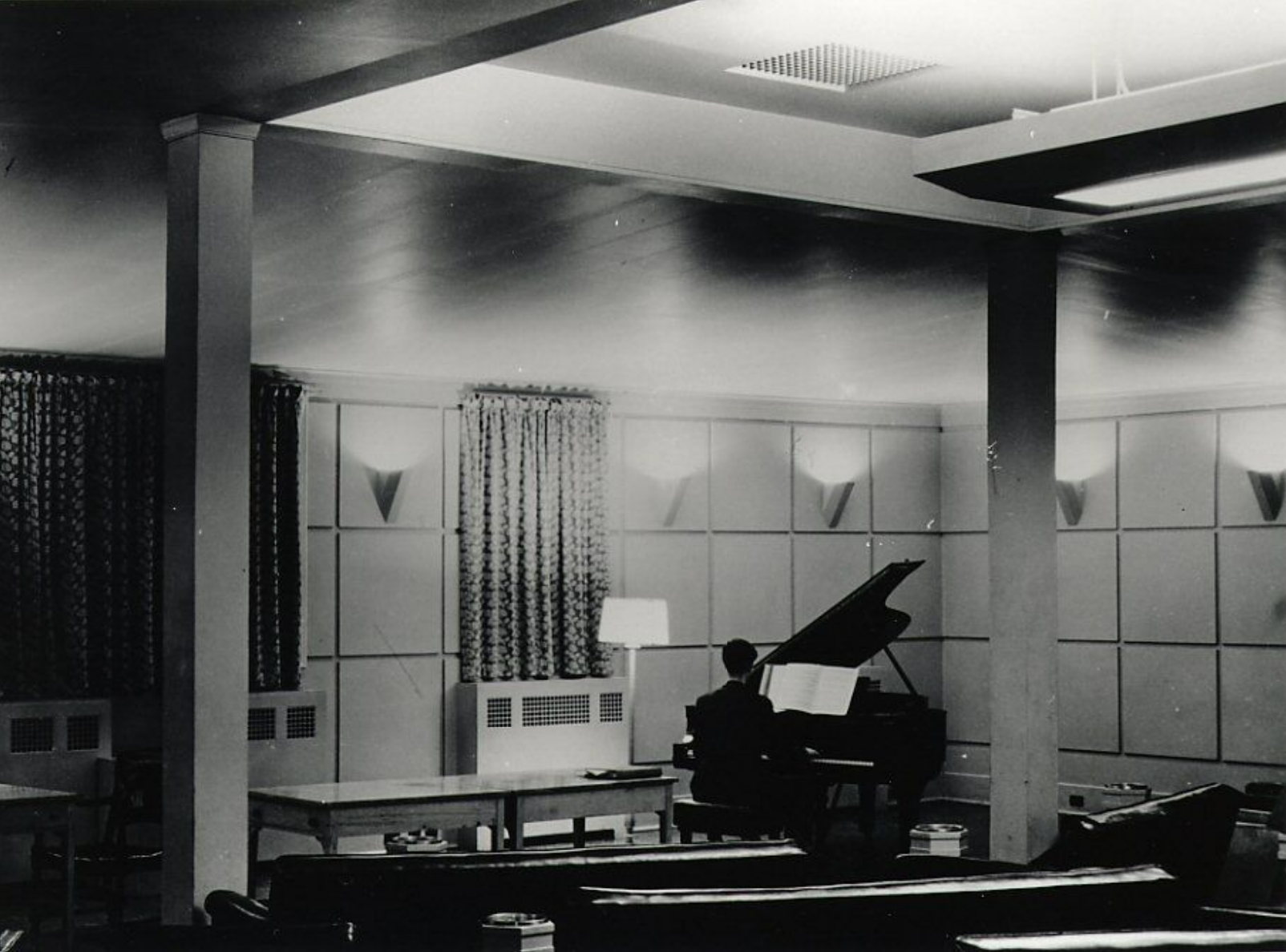
Piano

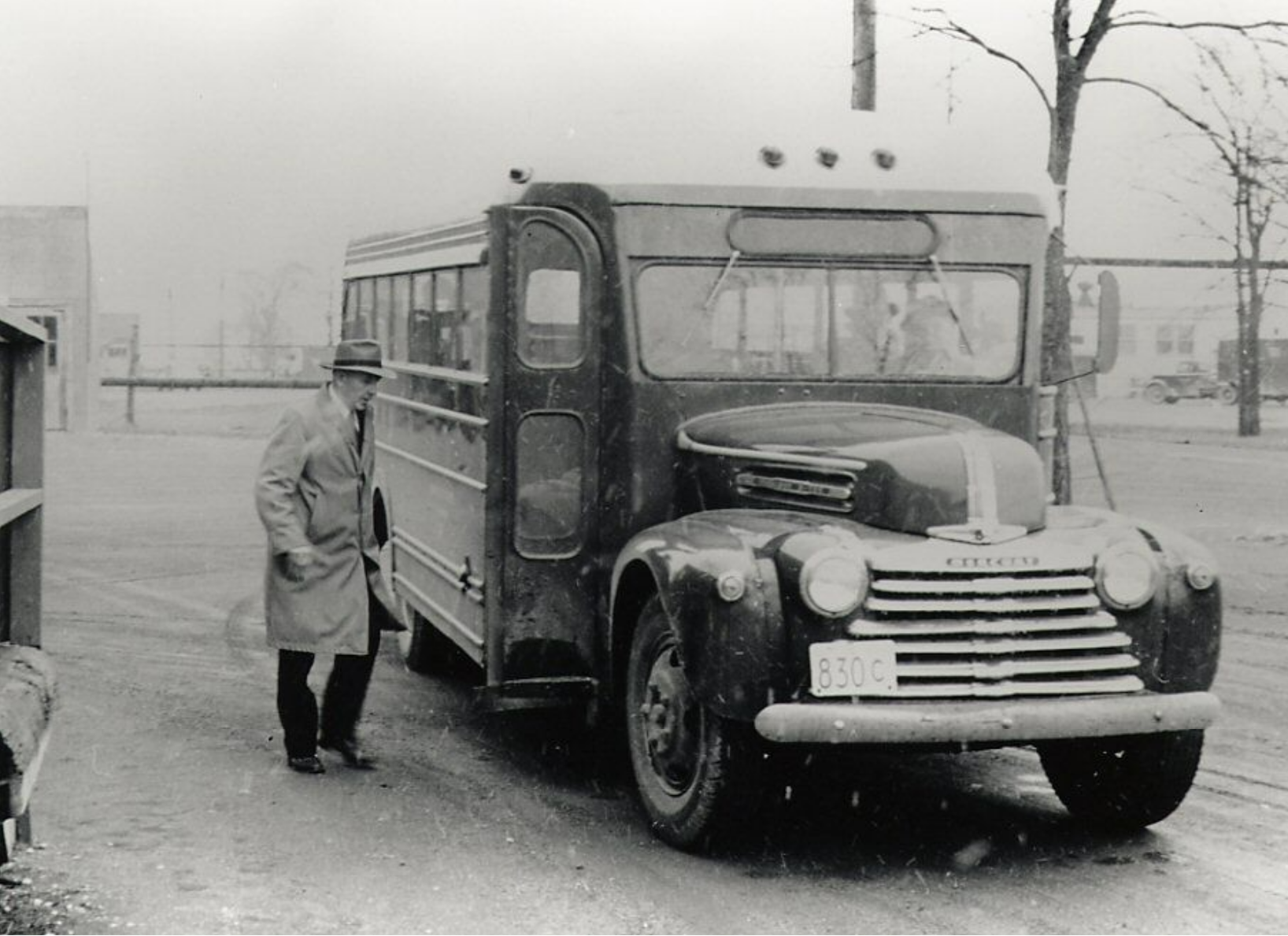
School bus

The Ajax campus was held classes from January 14, 1946 to April 1949, and around 6,000 students attended classes there during this period. Its peak year was 1946–47, when it had 3,312 students, including 1,794 first year students and 1,518 second year students. During this year, the campus had 210 instructors, including 131 from the Faculty of Applied Science and Engineering and 79 from the Faculty of Arts.

By the end of 1940s, the university was able to move the engineering classes back to Toronto, having built several new facilities, including the Wallberg Memorial Building on College Street and a new mechanical engineering building on the King's College Road. The federal government offered to sell the Ajax property to the university for cheap, with C. D. Howe stating that the university will have to ultimately find a site outside the Toronto city limits, and it will be hard to find one more suitable than Ajax. The university declined the offer, although Clarence Richard Young, its Dean of Engineering, stated that in the next 20 years, the university would have "a very definite interest in making use of some of the facilities" at Ajax.

During 1949–1953, the federal government used the site as a holding camp for war refugees from European countries like Yugoslavia. The government meanwhile transferred the DIL property to Central Mortgage and Housing Corporation (CMHC), mandating it to develop Ajax into an industrial town.
