= Wallace McCutcheon =

Wallace McCutcheon may refer to:

- Wallace McCutcheon Sr. (1858 or 1862–1918), pioneer cinematographer and director in the early American motion picture industry
- Wallace McCutcheon (politician) (1906–1969), Canadian lawyer, actuary and politician (unrelated to Wallace McCutcheon, Sr.)
