= John A. McDougald =

Canadian businessman (1908–1978)

Bud McDougald
- Born: 14 March 1908; Toronto, Ontario
- Died: 15 March 1978 (aged 70); Palm Beach, Florida
- Education: Upper Canada College; St. Andrew's College ('26)
- Spouse: Hedley Maude Eustace Smith (m. 1934)

John Angus "Bud" McDougald (14 March 1908 – 15 March 1978) was a leading Canadian businessman and owner of Thoroughbred racehorses. In 1975, journalist Peter Newman wrote that, "He may well be the least known and most admired member of the [Canadian] business Establishment. Without question, he is the most powerful."

Born in Toronto, Ontario, he was universally known by the nickname, "Bud". The son of a wealthy investment banker, after working as a stockbroker for Dominion Securities, in 1945 Bud McDougald teamed up with E. P. Taylor to establish Taylor, McDougald and Company Ltd. which would lead to his rise in the Taylor-controlled holding company, Argus Corporation. While McDougald would become involved in the sport of Thoroughbred racing, E. P. Taylor would devote much of his time to building his very successful Windfields Farm. That situation saw McDougald rise within the business to where he was appointed chairman of the board of directors and president of Argus. He was largely responsible for making it one of Canada's dominant business conglomerates that had controlling interest in Dominion Stores, Hollinger Mines, Massey Ferguson, Standard Broadcasting, Crown Trust and Domtar.

McDougald was one of the major biographies in Peter C. Newman's 1975 book, The Canadian Establishment.

McDougald died in Palm Beach, Florida in 1978. Two months after his death his widow and sister-in-law signed documents that gave Conrad Black control of Ravelston Corporation which in turn controlled Argus Corporation.

== Thoroughbred racing ==
Introduced to the sport by E. P. Taylor, McDougald was a founding member of the Jockey Club of Canada. He and his wife owned a number of Thoroughbred racehorses, the most successful of which was Nijinsky's Secret.
