= Ravelston Corporation =

Canadian holding company

Ravelston Corporation Limited was a Canadian holding company that was largely controlled by Conrad Black and business partner David Radler. At one time, it held a majority stake in Hollinger Inc., once one of the largest media corporations in the world. The company was placed into receivership in 2005 and went bankrupt in 2008.

== History ==
Ravelston was founded by a group of businessmen including Bud McDougald, Max Meighen and Conrad Black's father George Montegu Black. The company was a holding company for Argus Corporation. In 1978, Conrad Black took control with his brother of Ravelston after his father's death. Black later transformed Ravelston into a holding company which was the head of his global media empire in the 1980s and 1990s. The company was mostly owned by Black, who held a 67% share to Radler's 14%.

At one time, Ravelston controlled 78% of Hollinger Inc.'s stock with Black as CEO and Chairman and Radler as President. Ravelston held shares in Conrad Black's holding companies, such as Hollinger International, now known as Sun-Times Media Group. The Toronto-based private company had owned the British Daily Telegraph and Toronto's National Post newspapers. These papers were later sold, mostly to Canwest Global.

=== Demise ===
As a result of Black's and Radler's legal problems involving allegedly unauthorized 'non-compete' payments in the sale of Hollinger International newspapers, Ravelston entered into receivership in summer 2005. On April 20, 2005, Black and Radler resigned from Ravelston to facilitate a filing for bankruptcy protection. Black and four other executive were later convicted of fraud over the diversion of $6 million from Hollinger International. Ravelson was also charged with fraud by the US Attorney's office in Chicago. In 2005, Ravelston was placed in the hands of court-appointed receiver RSM Richter. Richter negotiated a settlement of the charges on the company's behalf in 2007. In December 2008, the company went bankrupt.
