= Village Food Stores =

Defunct supermarket chain in New Brunswick, Canada

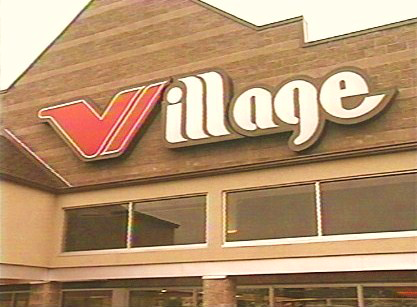
- Logo on store in Quispamsis, NB
- Founded: 1987; 38 years ago
- Founder: Food Group Inc.
- Defunct: 1995
- Area served: New Brunswick

Village Food Stores (known as simply Village on signs) was a chain of supermarkets operating in New Brunswick, Canada, between 1987 and 1995. The chain was formed by wholesaler The Food Group Inc. (FGI) when they bought most Dominion locations in the province after they left the Atlantic Canada market.

Most Village stores were in shopping malls, and they were never more than the third-largest grocery company in the province, after Sobeys and Atlantic Wholesalers. Village was the only unionized supermarket chain in New Brunswick, and concessions to the union after a threatened strike in 1994 brought FGI to bankruptcy.

Atlantic Wholesalers bought seven of FGI's stores in 1994, causing 410 employees to be laid off. converted most stores to the Atlantic SuperValu format by the end of 1995, and closed the others.

== See also ==
- List of Canadian supermarkets
