= Hollinger Inc. =

Defunct Canadian media company

- Industry: Publishing
- Predecessor: Hollinger Argus; Argcen Holdings; Labmin Resources
- Founded: 17 September 1985
- Founder: Conrad Black
- Defunct: 2007
- Fate: Bankruptcy
- Headquarters: 10 Toronto Street, Toronto, Ontario, Canada
- Products: Newspapers
- Number of employees: 8,500 (July 2000)
- Subsidiaries: Hollinger International

Hollinger Inc. was a Canadian media company based in Toronto which was established in 1985 by businessman Conrad Black. At one time, the company was the third-largest media empire in the world. In 1996, through stock purchases, it took over control of Southam Inc., at the time, Canada's largest newspaper chain and a newswire service. It sold its Canadian newspaper holdings to Canwest Global Communications Inc., in August 2000, which included the company's flagship national newspaper, the recently formed National Post. Hollinger, through its subsidiary Hollinger International, continued to own newspapers in the United States, including the Chicago Sun-Times. The company went bankrupt in 2007 and was delisted from the Toronto Stock Exchange in August 2008.

== History ==
Hollinger Inc. was used by Conrad Black as a holding company for his media interests after he acquired control of The Daily Telegraph in 1986. The company took its name from Hollinger Gold Mines, which started in 1909 and later became Hollinger Mines, owner of one of the world's largest gold mines near Timmins, Ontario. It was acquired by E.P. Taylor's conglomerate, Argus Corporation. Black took control of Argus in 1978, and he sold off its assets by 1985.

Hollinger Inc. was controlled by Canadian-based Ravelston Corporation, which was used as a personal holding company by Black. Ravelston was placed in receivership in the summer of 2005.

=== Holdings ===
Hollinger Inc. was the parent company of Chicago-based Hollinger International (now known as the Sun-Times Media Group), whose primary holdings included a group of Chicago newspapers. Its flagship paper was the Chicago Sun-Times. Hollinger also owned The Jerusalem Post and interests in Australian and Canadian newspaper chains. On 16 December 1996, Hollinger sold its 25 percent stake in Australian company John Fairfax Holdings to New Zealand's Brierley Group for $600 million USD, partially to help fund the company's recent purchase of Southam Inc.'s 32 newspapers in Canada. At the turn of the 21st century, Hollinger was the world's third-largest media company. In 2000, Hollinger sold its Canadian newspaper, magazine and internet assets to Canwest Global for $3.5 billion. Canwest eventually went bankrupt and its newspapers and wire service were bought by Postmedia Network in July 2010, with the former Hollinger paper, National Post, as its new flagship paper.

=== Demise ===
Hollinger became a holding company for stakes in various companies, including its controlling stake in Hollinger International. However, the ownership structure of Hollinger and other related companies was described as "complex" and "convoluted" and lead to its demise.

A series of non-competition payments and management fees made between 1999 and 2003 to Black and his associates would later lead to lengthy court and regulatory proceedings. In 2003 and 2004, Black was removed as owner from Hollinger, and other corporate positions, after there were claims made that he had looted his companies for personal profit. Shareholders learned that the company was facing serious financial problems. Shortly afterward, a number of court and regulatory orders left the company with no income or operating business.

On August 2, 2007, Hollinger filed for bankruptcy protection in Canada and the United States. At the time, the company was 78% owned by Black's company Ravelston. Hollinger continued to assert control over Sun-Media Times Group Inc. Hollinger shares were prevented from being traded by the Ontario Securities Commission on 23 July 2008, and were delisted from the Toronto Stock Exchange on 22 August 2008.
