= Bank pool loan =

Form of loan, used by US based firms trading on public markets

A bank pool loan (BPL) is a fairly new form of loan, used by US based firms trading on public markets that need funding of under $10,000,000. In a BPL, a group of European based banks (the pool), create a European firm whose sole purpose is to loan money to a US based company. Because this loan to the European based bank is completely insured, the BPL does not have as high a risk if the loan is defaulted on. Additionally, the pool actually makes more annual interest than if they were to loan money traditionally. This allows US based firms to borrow as much as $10,000,000 completely interest free as long as it is backed by collateral of some sort (usually stock). The Regulations require that the loan be of "good value" and so the newly formed European company usually requires securities to back the loan to pass this qualification.

It has become a low-cost method for low priced companies in the US over the counter markets like the OTCBB and the Pink Sheets to fund their companies by purposely defaulting on the loan and forfeiting the shares.

== Details ==
Bank pool loans (BPL) have only been in existence for the past eight years. In order to encourage European based firms to invest in firms based in foreign nations, Universal banking regulations have set forth that any European Union based firm, which is invested in a non-European Union member nations, which currently are not receiving international aid or have had a significant change in government in the past twenty years and borrow funds no greater than €7,000,000 EUR or $9,874,058.49 USD from any individual or group of EU member banking institutions

The BPL insurance will only apply under the following circumstances:

If the loan is made to a firm based in a non EU member country. The Loan is collateralized by some form of equity in the borrowers firm. The Bank or group of banks involved with a given BPL must assign a central Administrator. Other regulations set forth in the BPL guidelines.
