= Toronto Street Post Office =

Old Toronto Post Office / Old Bank of Canada
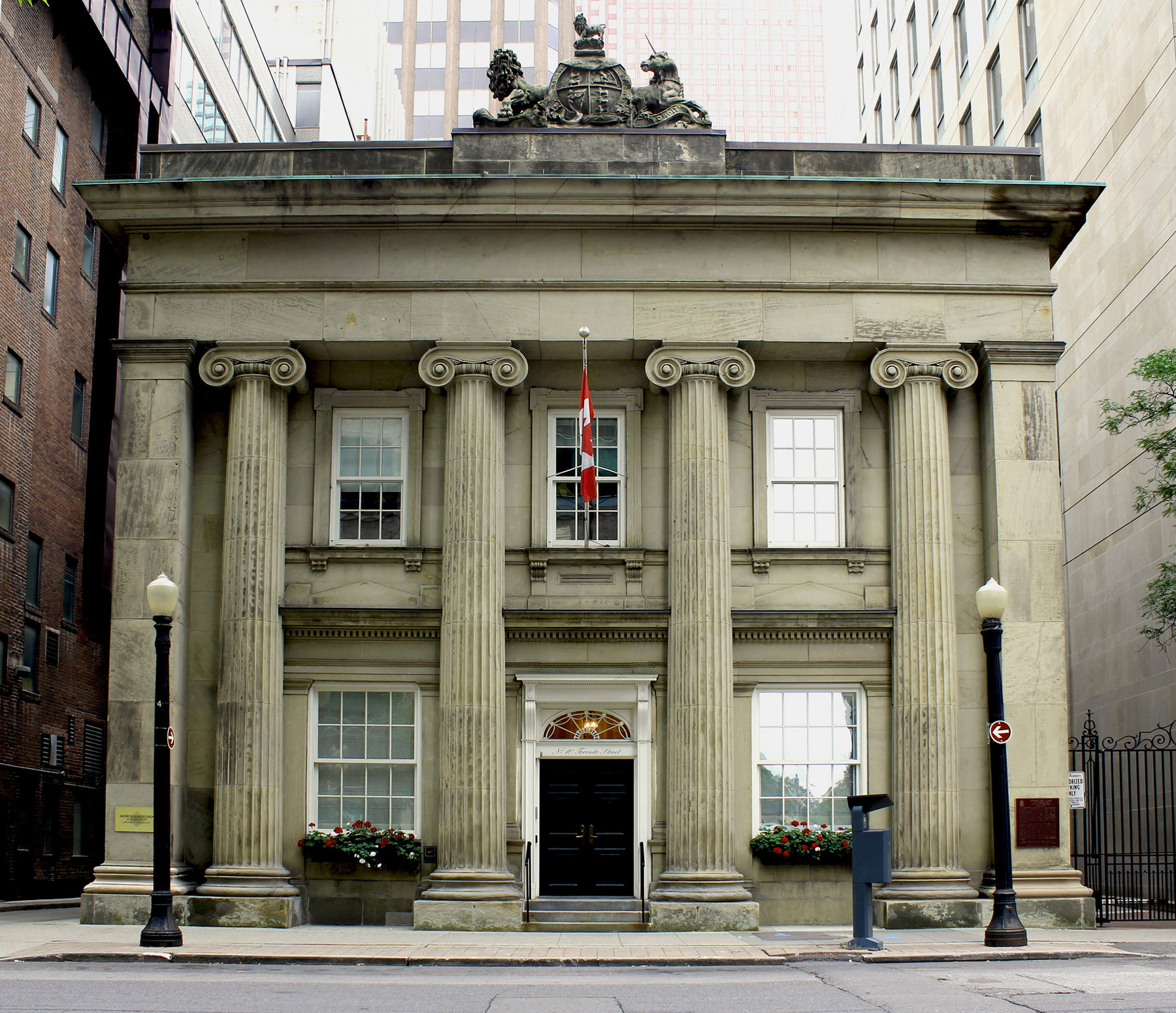
- 10 Toronto Street

- Location within Toronto Location within Ontario Location within Canada
- 43°39′00″N 79°22′35″W
- Location: Toronto, Ontario, Canada

History
- Built: 1853
- Original use: Post office

Site notes
- Architect(s): Cumberland & Ridout
- Architectural style: Greek Revival
- Current use: Office building

National Historic Site of Canada
- Designated: 1958

The Toronto Street Post Office, also known as Toronto's Seventh Post Office, is a heritage building in Toronto, Ontario, Canada. It was completed in 1853 and is located at 10 Toronto Street in downtown Toronto. The building was designed by Frederick William Cumberland and Thomas Ridout in the Greek Revival style.

== History ==
It served as a post office until 1872 and as a government office building until 1937. It was then used by the Bank of Canada until 1959, when it became the head office of E. P. Taylor's Argus Corporation, which was subsequently controlled by Conrad Black. It was here that Conrad Black was taped removing boxes of documents from the office.

The building was sold to Morgan Meighen & Associates, an independent Canadian investment manager, in 2006 for CA$14 million. The building was up for auction and they were one of 70 bidders for the 12,000 square foot property in downtown Toronto.

In 1958, the building was designated a National Historic Site of Canada. In 2006, it was designated by the City of Toronto under the Ontario Heritage Act (By-law 182–2006).

== See also ==
- Argus Corporation
- List of oldest buildings and structures in Toronto
