= BPL (time service) =

Time signal radio station in China

BPL is the call sign of the official long-wave time signal service of the People's Republic of China, operated by the Chinese Academy of Sciences, broadcasting on 100 kHz from CAS's National Time Service Center in Pucheng County, Shaanxi at 34°56′54″N 109°32′34″E, roughly 70 km northeast of Lintong, along with NTSC's short-wave time signal BPM on 2.5, 5.0, 10.0, and 15.0 MHz.

BPL broadcasts LORAN-C compatible format signal from 5:30 to 13:30 UTC, using an 800 kW transmitter covering a radius up to 3,000 km.
