= Biological pollution =

Impact of human activity on the environment

Biological pollution (impacts or bio pollution) is the impact of humanity's actions on the quality of aquatic and terrestrial environment. Specifically, biological pollution is the introduction of non-indigenous and invasive species, otherwise known as Invasive Alien Species (IAS). When the biological pollution is introduced to an aquatic environment, it contributes to water pollution.

Biopollution may cause adverse effects at several levels of biological organization:

- an individual organism (internal pollution by parasites or pathogens),
- a population (by genetic change, i.e. hybridization of IAS with a native species),
- a community or biocoenosis (by structural shifts, i.e. dominance of IAS, replacement or elimination of native species),
- a habitat (by modification of physical-chemical conditions),
- an ecosystem (by alteration of energy and organic material flow).

Biopollution may also cause decline in naturalness of nature conservation areas, adverse economic consequences and impacts on human health. The notion of "biological pollution" and "biological pollutants" described by Elliott (2000) is generally accepted in invasion biology; it was used to develop the concept of biopollution level assessment (Olenin et al., 2007) and criteria for a Good Ecological Status descriptor in the European Marine Strategy Framework Directive (Olenin et al., 2010)

The magnitude of the bioinvasion impact or biopollution level (Olenin et al., 2007) may be quantified using a free online service BINPAS.

In 1991 The Indiana Academy of Science held a national cross disciplinary conference in Indianapolis (McKnight 1993), the first of its find dealing with the issue.

== Biopollution level ==
"Biopollution Level (BPL)" is a quantitative measure of the magnitude of the biological invasion impact, ranging from "no impact" (BPL=0) through "weak" (BPL=1), "moderate" (BPL=2), "strong" (BPL=3) and "massive" (BPL=4) impact.

Initially the method of calculation involves assessing the abundance and distribution range of a non-indigenous species (NIS) for a specific area (this can be, for example, an entire regional sea, bay, inlet, lagoon, pond, lake, marina, a sand bank, an aquaculture site etc.). Abundance of a NIS may be ranked as "low", "moderate" or "high"; and the distribution may be scored as "one locality" (when a NIS was found only at one locality within the assessment area), "several localities", "many localities" or "all localities" (found at all localities). Combination of the abundance and distribution scores gives five classes of the abundance and distribution range. Once obtained this value aids in calculating an impact on 1) native communities, 2) habitats and, 3) ecosystem functioning. The calculation is based on ecological concepts, e.g. "key species", "type specific communities", "habitat alteration, fragmentation and loss", "functional groups", "food web shift", etc. Calculations are for a stated time period to enable assessment of temporal changes.

The method can be used for a single species or for several species for a specific (assessment) area. The method was designed for species in aquatic ecosystems (Olenin et al., 2007) but is currently being tested for terrestrial environments and there is a free on-line service BINPAS.

The biopollution level enables quantification of an impact in a robust manner in a standard and repeatable way. It makes it possible for comparison between different regions and taxonomic groups at different time intervals. The most impacting biota can be readily distinguished for a given region. It does not evaluate whether an impact effect is either good or bad, it states the change in an ecosystem due to an alien species invasion and measures the magnitude of this change. However, the method requires adequate information in order to obtain the magnitude of the impact, assessed at three levels of confidence (low, medium and high) according to the quality of the data available.

The method is simple to undertake and provide a means of quantifying impacts within any world region. Some assessments have been published (Olenina et al., 2010).
