= Burlington Public Library (Ontario) =

Library system in Ontario, Canada

- 43°20′9.118″N 79°47′24.036″W
- Location: Burlington, Ontario, Canada
- Established: 1872; 154 years ago
- Architect: Central Branch designed by Teeple Architects Inc
- Branches: 7

Collection
- Size: 240,000 physical items

Access and use
- Circulation: 2 million

Other information
- Director: Lita Barrie, CEO
- Website: www.bpl.on.ca

The Burlington Public Library (BPL) is a public library system that provides service to residents of Burlington, Ontario. It was seven branches. It was a wide collection of books, CDs, DVDs, technology, and millions of digital resources. It is also host to a seed library. It was established in 1872 in a schoolhouse.

== History ==
The Burlington Public Library was founded in 1872 as an addition to the local school building. It was not until 1906 that the Burlington Public Library received its first permanent building, located at the current site of the Burlington City Hall. The building was completely financed by politician and businessman John Waldie under the condition that the village provide the land. In 1960 BPL Aldershot Branch, BPL's first satellite location, opens in the basement of the market chain store Dominion. By 2013, BPL had opened seven branches with the opening of the Alton Branch.

In 2005, BPL built a new central branch.

In 2023, BPL launched the Burlington Digital Archive which allowed the public to access thousands of item in the BPL archives through digital access.

In 2025, BPL opened the new New Appleby Branch at 5151 New St. The old Appleby Branch had been located at the 676 Appleby Line for over 30 years.

== Governance ==
The Burlington Public Library is governed by a board appointed by Burlington City Council. The board is composed of six citizen members and one city councillor. This arrangement is in accordance with the Public Libraries Act, 1990.

== Services ==
=== Collections ===
The Burlington Public Library has a collection of over 240,000 physical books, CDs, and movies.

==== Local History Collection ====
The Burlington Public Library houses an archive of local historical materials. The Burlington Public Library has a partnership with the Burlington Historical Society (BHS) to promote and research Burlington's history.

=== Seed Library ===
The Burlington Public Library is host to a seed library. This service allows patrons to receive and exchange seeds.

== Branches ==
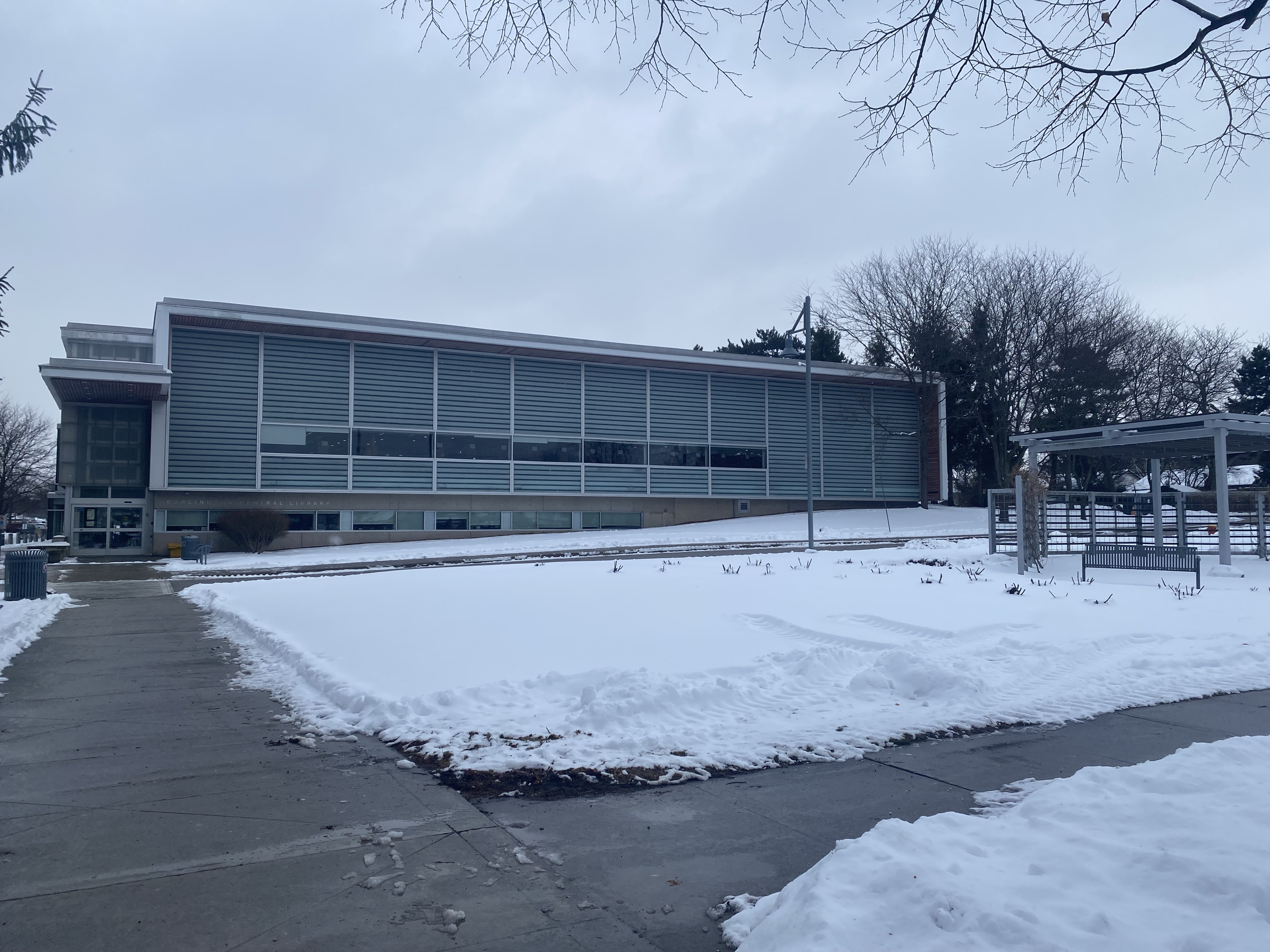
The Central Branch of the Burlington Public Library

- Central Branch
- Aldershot Branch
- Alton Branch
- Brant Hills Branch
- Kilbride Branch
- New Appleby Branch
- Tansley Woods Branch
