= Crown Trust Company =

Canadian trust company (1897–1983)

- Formerly: Trusts & Guarantee Company of Canada (1897–1946); Crown Trust & Guarantee Company (1946–1947)
- Industry: Trust company
- Founded: 24 February 1897
- Defunct: 1983
- Fate: Collapsed
- Headquarters: 302 Bay Street, Toronto, Ontario

The Crown Trust Company was a Canadian trust company that was headquartered in Ontario and operated in most of Canada. It collapsed in 1983.

== History ==
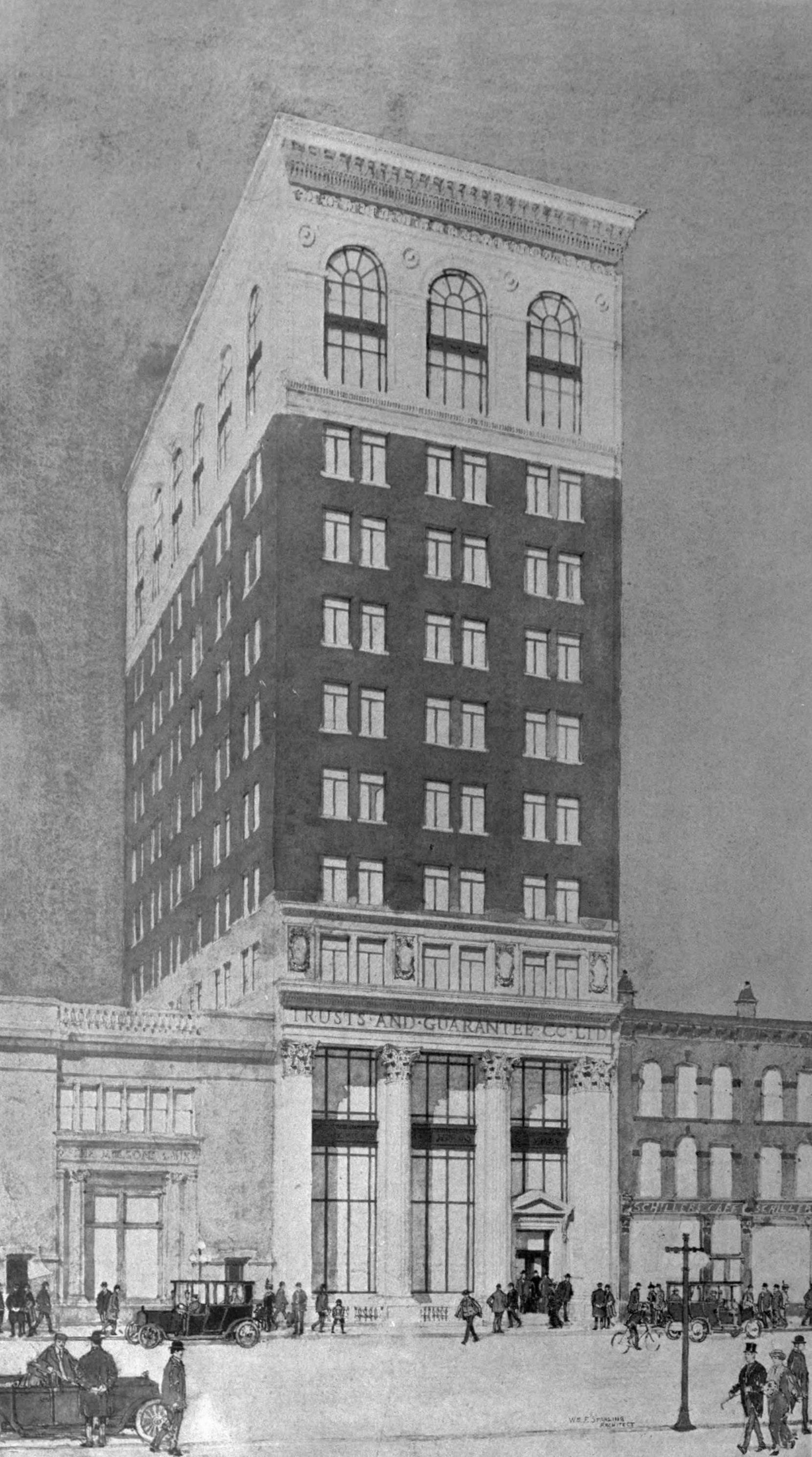
The 1916 head office at 302 Bay Street, designed by Curry & Sparling

In January 1946, the Trust and Guarantee Company Limited acquired Crown Trust. For one year it operated under the name the Crown Trust and Guarantee Company. In December 1947 it was renamed the Crown Trust Company.

In 1983 the trust collapsed and the Canada Deposit Insurance Corporation (CDIC) stepped in to protect clients. The CDIC organized for all the assets and responsibilities to be transferred to Central Trust Company. However, as the trust was provincially incorporated and under Ontario's jurisdiction, each province had to pass legislation to effect the transfer.
