= William Eric Phillips =

Canadian businessman (1893–1964)

- Born: 3 January 1893; Willowdale, Ontario
- Died: 26 December 1964 (aged 71); Palm Beach, Florida
- Education: University of Toronto (BASc 1914)
- Spouse(s): Mary Eileen McLaughlin (m. 1918) Doris Delano Smith (m. 1940)
- Military career
- Branch: British Army
- Service years: 1914–1920
- Rank: Lieutenant Colonel
- Unit: Royal Warwickshire Regiment
- Conflicts: World War I

William Eric Phillips CBE DSO MC (3 January 1893 – 26 December 1964) was a Canadian businessman. Phillips was the chairman and chief executive officer of Massey Ferguson, at the time of his death the largest producer of farm machinery in the British Commonwealth, and founding chairman of Argus Corporation, a position he held until his death.

== Early life, education and military service ==
Phillips was born in Willowdale, Ontario, Canada. He entered the British Army as a private soldier at the outbreak of World War I. In 1916 he won field promotion to lieutenant-colonel, at 24 years of age the youngest in the army. He was awarded the Military Cross and the Distinguished Service Order. Phillips graduated from the University of Toronto in 1919 with a degree in chemical engineering.

== Career ==
He established his own company, W.E. Phillips Ltd, in Oshawa, Ontario, in 1922, to supply auto glass for General Motors of Canada.

During World War II, Phillips was appointed head of Research Enterprises, Ltd., a Canadian crown corporation intended to produce optical instruments, and later assigned production of radar equipment. He was created a Commander of the Order of the British Empire for these services.

At the end of World War II, Phillips joined E. P. Taylor and others in Argus Corporation, becoming chairman of this investment firm in November 1945. He would hold this position until his death in December 1964. He was reputedly the intellectual superior of this tightly-knit group of investors.

From 1945 until the year of his death he was chairman of the board of directors of the University of Toronto.

=== Massey Ferguson ===
Phillips was recruited to the chairmanship of what later became Massey Ferguson by E.P. Taylor at the end of World War II. By 1946, Taylor and Phillips possessed or controlled eight per cent of Massey common stock. They convinced Victor Emanuel, president of the AVCO Manufacturing Corporation, to purchase 6.4% of Massey's float; when this was disagreeable to the management of the firm, Argus purchased that block as well. This block of common stock formed the single largest group of shares in the firm, a position from which they would dominate its actions from 1947 onwards.

== Family ==
Phillips married Eileen McLaughlin, the eldest of five daughters to R.S. McLaughlin, the founder of General Motors of Canada. The marriage ended in 1945.
