= Dominion (supermarket) =

Canadian supermarket chain

Dominion Stores Ltd.
- Type: Division
- Industry: Supermarket
- Founded: 1919 in Toronto, Ontario, Canada
- Founders: J. William Pentland; Robert Jackson
- Defunct: December 2008
- Fate: Rebranded as Metro
- Headquarters: Toronto, Ontario, Canada
- Brands: Private labels: Master Choice; Equality
- Parent: Metro Inc.
- Website: www.metro.ca

Dominion was a national chain of supermarkets in Canada. The chain was founded in 1919 in Ontario and was later acquired by the Argus Corporation. It was broken up in the mid-1980s, with key locations and the rights to the brand sold to The Great Atlantic & Pacific Tea Company (A&P), which restricted the chain to the Greater Toronto Area. Stores elsewhere in Ontario were converted to the A&P banner, and others were sold to third parties. A&P's Canadian division was later acquired by Metro Inc., which rebranded the remaining Dominion stores to its namesake banner in 2008.

== History ==
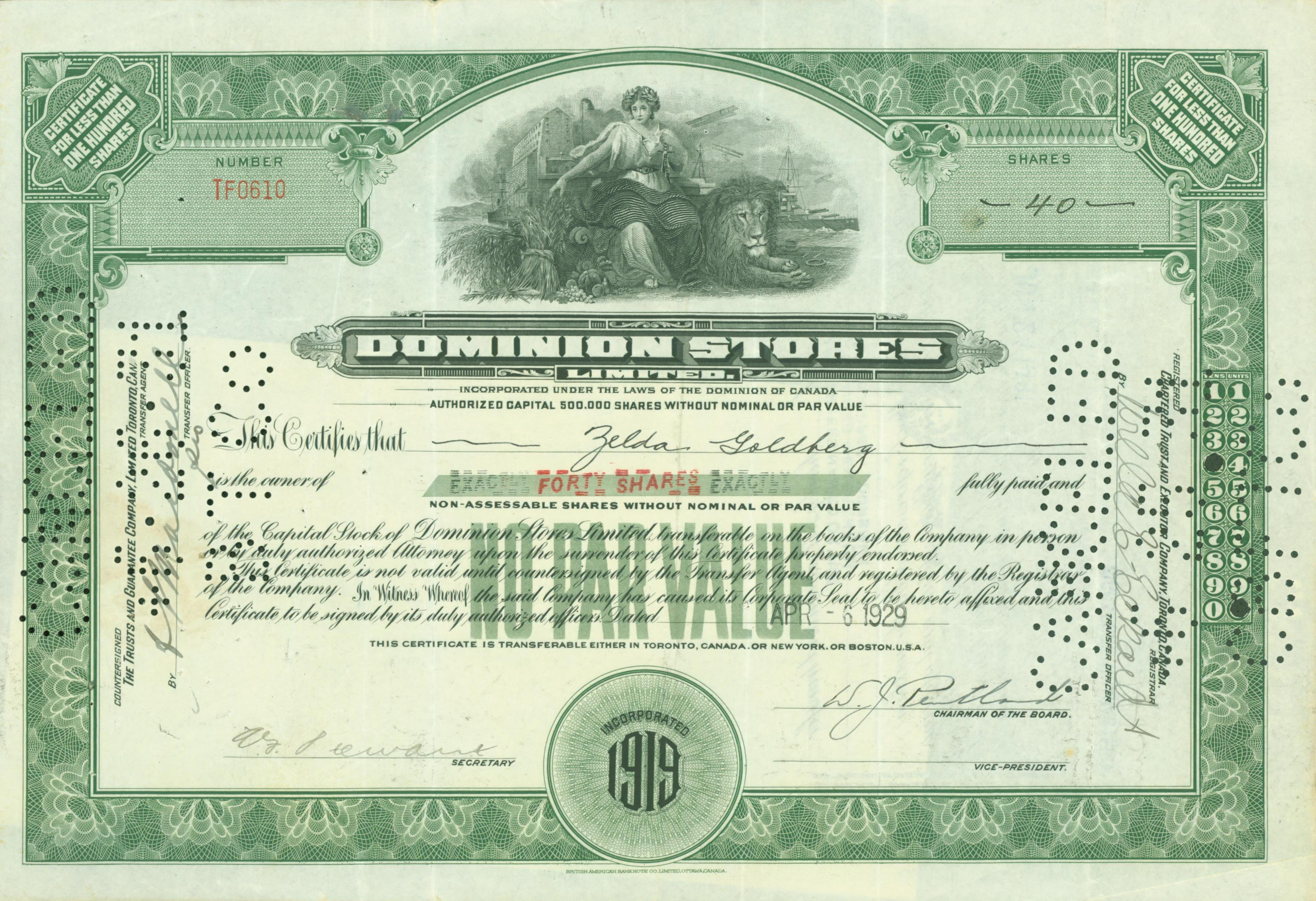
Share of the Dominion Stores Ltd., issued 6 April 1929

Dominion started from one Toronto store on May 23, 1919. The store was founded by American businessmen Robert Jackson of New Hampshire and William J. Pentland of Connecticut. Pentland was manager of A&P stores in Connecticut and was hired by Jackson. By the end of 1919, they had a 20-store chain of which 18 were acquired from rival Loblaws. A year later, they had 61 stores. In 1929, Dominion tried to acquire a stake in Loblaws, but the stock market crash ended the growth. During the Depression, Dominion lost both founders: Jackson went bankrupt and Pentland was killed in an auto accident in 1933.

Dominion's leadership was not resolved until 1939, when J. William Horsey became president. He in turn sold Dominion Stores to Argus Corporation. Smaller stores were consolidated from 574 to 195 by 1954. In the 1950s, Dominion began to build large stores with airy ceilings and large glass fronts. The chain also expanded beyond Toronto to other parts of Ontario, Quebec, Alberta, Manitoba, Saskatchewan and Atlantic Canada.

=== Breakup ===
In 1978, Conrad Black took control of the Argus Corporation. Moving the Dominion holdings into the Hollinger Inc. portion of Argus, Dominion was stripped of cash from the daily flow.

A&P's Canadian division, A&P Canada, acquired 92 of Dominion's prime locations in Ontario, as well as a head office, warehouses, and rights to the Dominion name from Hollinger in 1985, the final year of Black's sell off of virtually all previous holdings of Argus Corporation. The chain's remaining assets were sold piecemeal over the next two years.

In northwestern Ontario, Safeway acquired at least two stores in Thunder Bay. (Safeway's presence in Thunder Bay prevents Metro from offering Air Miles at its Thunder Bay locations.)

In Western Canada, Dominion stores were closed, leaving many suburban shopping malls scrambling to fill large, now-vacant sections. This event, coupled with the subsequent collapse of several department store chains, sparked a wave of mall renovations in many parts of the country. Alberta stores were acquired by Safeway in the late 1960s.

Much of the remainder of the chain in eastern and central Canada was ultimately acquired by Loblaw Companies, through several unrelated transactions:

- Ontario: The Mr. Grocer franchise banner of 58 stores, consisting mostly of former Dominion stores converted prior to the breakup in an attempt to change them to non-union operation, were sold for $40 million to Loblaw, which soon phased out the brand and signage.
- Newfoundland: Dominion stores in Newfoundland were sold to local owners, who then resold them to Loblaw in 1995. The Newfoundland locations are the only ones to continue under the Dominion banner; see Dominion Stores.
- New Brunswick: Shortly after the A&P acquisition, these stores were sold to Food Group Inc., which operated them under the Village banner until Food Group was sold to Loblaw and merged into its Atlantic Superstore unit in 1995.
- Nova Scotia: These locations were sold to Oshawa Group and became IGA stores. However, after Sobeys purchased Oshawa in 1999, Loblaw took over IGA's Atlantic Canada locations.
- Quebec: Dominion stores in Quebec were sold to Provigo in 1981; Provigo was acquired by Loblaws in 1998.

=== Battle over pension surplus ===
In 1985, during the chain's breakup, the Argus-controlled Dominion Stores Ltd.—renamed Domgroup Ltd. in April 1986—withdrew $37.9 million from its defined benefit pension plan for Canadian employees. The amount represented an actuarial surplus in the plan, and Dominion had approval from the provincial regulator, the Pension Commission of Ontario (a predecessor entity to the Financial Services Regulatory Authority of Ontario) to make the withdrawal. However, the right to make that withdrawal was challenged by the union representing the employees, the Retail, Wholesale and Department Store Union. In September 1986, Justice Robert Reid of the Ontario Supreme Court of Justice ordered Domgroup to return the money to the plan, stating in his judgment that Dominion "had no right, under the plan documents, to remove the surplus". Domgroup eventually reached a settlement with the union to withdraw a portion of the surplus.

=== A&P's "New Dominion" ===
A&P placed the stores it acquired in 1985 under a subsidiary named New Dominion Stores Inc., and initially operated them under the "New Dominion" name (later adjusting the branding to "Super Dominion"). During a one-year transition period, these stores co-existed in Ontario with the "old" Dominion stores that Argus hadn't sold to A&P, causing customer confusion. At one point during this period, the head of A&P Canada said he called Black personally to ensure the Argus-owned stores' marketing abided by the sale contract, as some ads had referenced those stores still being Canadian-owned (whereas A&P was based in the U.S. and controlled by Germany's Tengelmann Group). Most of the remaining "old" Dominion stores ultimately closed in early 1986, ahead of A&P gaining exclusive rights to the name on April 30.

Beginning a few months after the acquisition, and continuing into the 1990s, A&P rebranded all of its stores in the Greater Toronto Area as Dominion stores, absorbing Miracle Food Mart, while Dominion locations elsewhere in Ontario took the A&P or Food Basics name.

The final territory of Dominion stores was approximately the following: Toronto; York Region, excluding Stouffville; Mississauga and Oakville; and Pickering and Ajax.

=== Demise ===
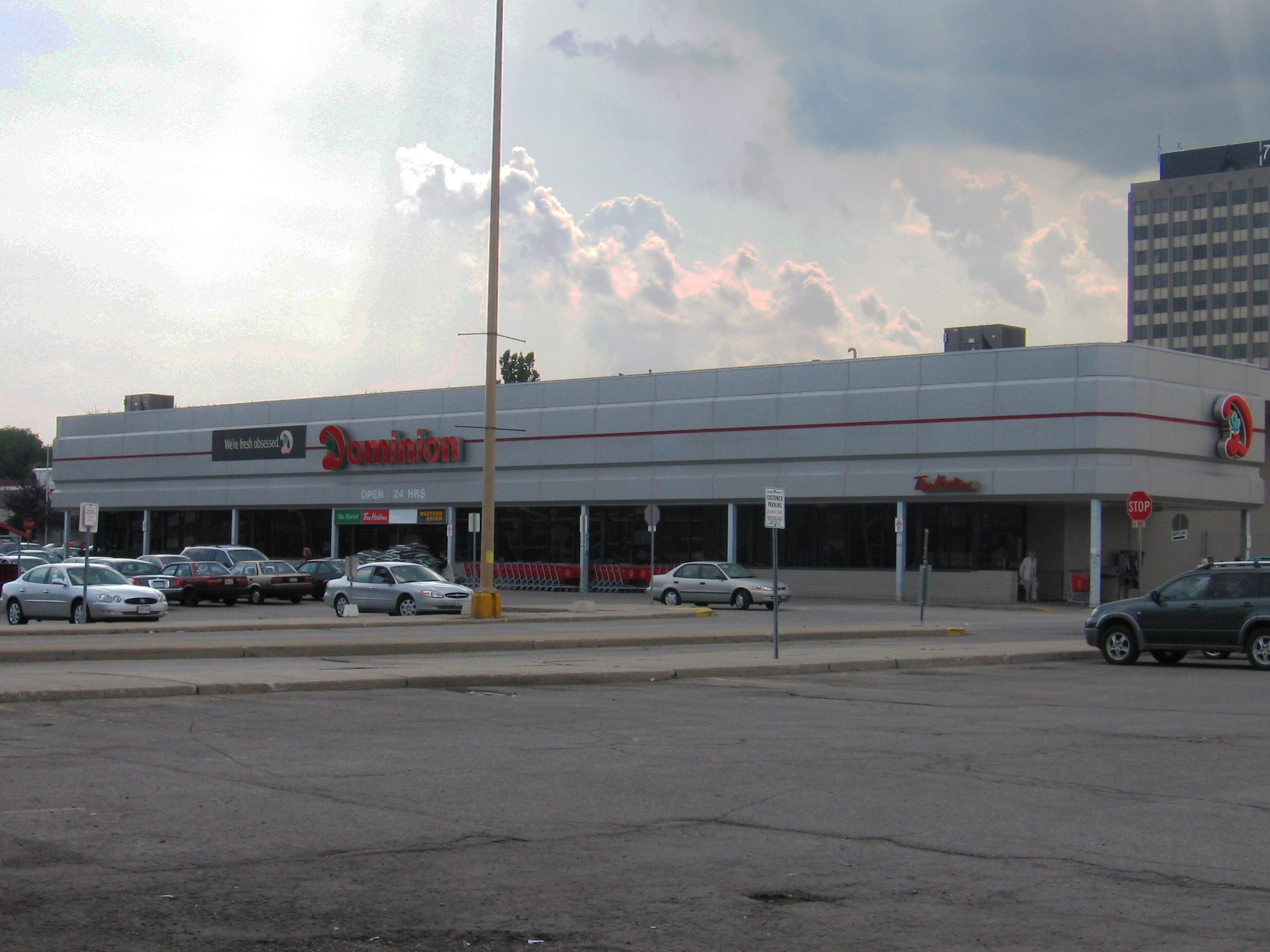
Exterior of a typical Dominion store (at Don Mills Centre in Don Mills, Toronto, Ontario), prior to re-branding as Metro in late 2008

Metro, which had operated solely in Quebec and the Ottawa area, acquired A&P Canada from the U.S.-based parent company effective August 15, 2005. A&P retained a minority ownership share of the combined company for a time.

On August 7, 2008, Metro announced it would invest $200 million consolidating the company's conventional food stores under the Metro banner. Over a period of 15 months, all stores were converted to the Metro name, beginning with the Dominion stores in the Toronto area.

Dominion's distribution centres in Toronto and Mississauga retained the old Dominion banner until 2009.

== Key people ==
- J. William Pentland — co-founder
- Robert Jackson — co-founder
- J. William Horsey — President
- John A. McDougald — financier and controlling interest in 1940s to 1970s
- E. P. Taylor
- Conrad Black

== See also ==
- List of supermarket chains in Canada
