= Scene+ =

Canadian loyalty program

- Type: Loyalty program
- Company: Scene LP
- Owner: Cineplex Inc.; Empire Company; Scotiabank
- Area served: Canada
- Introduced: 2007; 19 years ago
- Number of users: 10,000,000+
- Accrual partners: Rakuten, Cineplex, Scotiabank, Recipe Unlimited
- Rewards: Shopping, dining, movies, entertainment, travel, banking
- Reward partners: Expedia, Cineplex, Scotiabank, Recipe Unlimited, Apple, Best Buy, Home Hardware, Sobeys, Safeway, Thrifty Foods, Lawtons, Foodland, Needs, IGA, FreshCo, Chalo! FreshCo, Rachelle Béry, Les Marchés Tradition, Voilà, Shell Canada,
- Website: sceneplus.ca

Scene+ (formerly Scene) is a Canadian loyalty program established in 2007. It is owned by Scene LP, which is jointly owned by Cineplex, Scotiabank, and Empire Company.

Members earn points via purchases of tickets and concessions at Cineplex-owned cinemas and entertainment centres, as well as via purchases made on eligible Scotiabank debit and credit cards. Points can be redeemed for discounts at Cineplex establishments, as well as participating retailers and restaurants. In 2021, the service merged with Scotiabank's Scotia Rewards service, and expanded to include partnerships with Expedia, Rakuten, and the ability to redeem points to credit on Scotiabank credit and debit accounts.

In June 2022, Empire Company joined the partnership and added its supermarket chains, including Safeway and Sobeys, to the Scene+ program, ending its previous participation in Air Miles. Home Hardware and Shell Canada joined the program in 2023 and 2026 respectively, with the latter also replacing Air Miles.

== History ==
The Scene rewards program was launched in 2007 as a partnership between Cineplex and Scotiabank. The program allowed members to earn points that they could spend on free movies, 1,000 points per movie, as well as providing a 10% discount on concession stand purchases. Scene branded Visa and debit cards were also launched by Scotiabank, which allowed Scene members to earn points on purchases outside of Cineplex properties. The debit card was the first in Canada to allow cardholders to earn rewards. As part of the partnership, Scotiabank also acquired naming rights to additional Cineplex flagship locations to add them to their Scotiabank Theatre banner.

In June 2012, Cineplex started offering an additional 10% off on Tuesday movie ticket prices to Scene members.

In October 2014, Scene announced a partnership with Sport Chek, allowing customers to earn and redeem points at these stores. This partnership ended in October 2017, as Sport Chek then begin to offer its parent company's Canadian Tire Money, which became Triangle Rewards in 2018. In February 2015, Scene announced a similar partnership with Cara Operations at eleven of its restaurant brands.

In 2015, Cineplex announced that premium and VIP movie tickets would cost more points to redeem. Premium movie tickets (3D, D-Box, IMAX, and UltraAVX) would cost 1,500 points and VIP movie would cost 2,000 points instead of the standard 1,000 points.

On December 14, 2021, Scene merged with Scotiabank's Scotia Rewards program and was renamed Scene+; the new service adds partnerships with additional retail partners, integration with Rakuten for cashback offers, and the ability to redeem points towards hotel and travel bookings (via a partnership with Expedia), and credit to Scotiabank debit and credit card accounts.

On June 7, 2022, Empire Company (which had previously owned cinemas under the Empire Theatres banner until 2013, when it exited the industry and sold its locations to Cineplex and Landmark Cinemas) announced that it would discontinue its participation in Air Miles and acquire a stake in Scene+. Since August 2022, and gradually rolling across Canada, Scene+ points can be earned and redeemed at its grocery store (such as Sobeys, Safeway, FreshCo, Foodland, IGA, and Thrifty Foods) and pharmacy and convenience store (Lawtons and Needs) chains.

In September 2023, Home Hardware began to participate in Scene+. In January 2026, it was announced that Shell Canada would join Scene+, ending its participation in Air Miles after 34 years (the Bank of Montreal had announced its replacement of the program with Blue Rewards the same day), with a soft launch in Alberta in March 2026, and a rollout through the remainder of Canada in May. As part of the agreement, eligible Scotiabank and Tangerine cardholders would also be eligible for additional discounts at Shell Canada stores.

In February 2026, it was announced that Scene+ would be extended to Scotiabank subsidiary Tangerine beginning April 20, 2026. On May 13, 2026, Cineplex implemented changes to the distribution of Scene+ points at its theatres to disincentivize non-premium purchases, reducing the amount of points earned per-dollar spent on regular movie tickets, concessions, merchandise, and arcade credits from 5 points to 3, and increasing the amount of points earned for "premium" movie tickets from 5 points to 6.

== Points ==
Earning and redeeming points is broken down into several categories, movies, shopping, dining, travel, entertainment, and banking. Points are generally redeemable for 1 cent per point, but some offers redeem points at a lower value.

Points can be earned and redeemed for the movie, dining, and entertainment categories at Cineplex cinemas and entertainment establishments (such as The Rec Room) and participating restaurants, including Recipe Unlimited properties. For the shopping category, points can be redeemed for gift cards at over 60 retailers or directly at Apple and Best Buy. In this category, members can also earn points while shopping online by using Scene+ Rakuten. For the travel category, members can earn and redeem points through the Scene+ Travel portal powered by Expedia for travel-related purchases. In the banking category, members with eligible Scotiabank debit and credit cards can earn points for every card purchase, and can also convert their points into account credit for their Scotiabank account. Scotiabank cardholders can also book with a travel operator and apply Scene+ points to their trip within 12 months.

== Ownership ==
The program is owned by Scene LP, a joint venture between Scotia Loyalty Ltd., a subsidiary of The Bank of Nova Scotia, Galaxy Entertainment Inc., a subsidiary of Cineplex Entertainment LP, and Empire Company Ltd., each with a 33.3% stake. Intellectual property for the program is owned by the Scene IP Corporation, which is owned 50% / 50% by Cineplex and Scotiabank.
