= Cookie Bluff =

Canadian cookie dough company

- Company type: edible cookie dough manufacturer
- Founded: 2017; 9 years ago
- Key people: Sébastien Fiset (founder); Charles Simard (co-founder)

Cookie Bluff Café, generally shortened to brand name Cookie Bluff, is a Quebec-based restaurant and mass distributor of edible cookie dough and cookie dough-based products across Canada. The company began as an entrepreneurial effort by founders Sébastien Fiset and Charles Simard; Fiset had been inspired by a viral video on social media promoting a New York-based edible cookie dough bar that was very successful. Fiset noticed that Quebec social media users were complaining about the lack of an edible cookie dough distributor in Canada. Cookie Bluff was founded in 2017, began selling small plastic tubs of edible cookie dough in 2018, and then opened its first walk-in restaurant café, which is located in Galeries de la Capitale. The café's menu also offers bubble tea and various desserts.

== Edible cookie dough tubs ==
Cookie Bluff's main business endeavour, which earned the company attention elsewhere in Canada beyond Quebec, is the making and distribution of edible raw cookie dough in 400 gram plastic tubs, referred to by the company as "pots". The cookie dough is notable for being egg-free, kosher, safe for pregnant women to consume, and sold in recyclable packaging. Tubs are sold in various locations, including Sobeys, Lawton's Drugs, Wal-Mart and a number of Canadian gas station chains. Although more expensive than most raw cookie dough brands in Canada (with one 400 gram tub costing $7.99 CAD in Nova Scotia as of 2022), the Cookie Bluff brand is the first to sell fully-edible raw cookie dough in Canada. The company has 1,300 points of sale across Canada.

=== Available flavours ===
- Cookies and cream
- Signature chocolate
- Birthday cake
- Triple chocolate brownie
- Maple and walnut
- Smarties (in market test with Nestlé)

Also available are "Nim Nums", bite-sized pieces of cookie dough.

== Impact of COVID-19 on Cookie Bluff ==
Cookie Bluff was noted as a surviving Canadian business during the COVID-19 pandemic, doing radio interviews with CBC News about the experience and its financial impact on small Canadian companies, as well as on the safety of eating raw cookie dough at home. Fiset invested all of his capital from Cookie Bluff into Bobba, a Taiwanese bubble tea company, in the midst of the pandemic.
