= Empire Company =

Canadian conglomerate

Empire Company Limited
- Logo since 2022
- Type: Public
- Traded as: TSX: EMP.A
- Industry: Conglomerate/ Holding company
- Founded: 1963; 63 years ago
- Headquarters: Stellarton, Nova Scotia, Canada
- Number of locations: 1500 stores, 350 retail fuel (2020)
- Key people: Pierre St-Laurent, President and CEO
- Brands: Compliments
- Revenue: ▲$26.588 billion CAD (2019)
- Operating income: ▲$1.112 billion CAD (2019)
- Net income: ▲$0.613 billion CAD (2019)
- Total assets: ▲$14.633 billion CAD (2019)
- Total equity: ▼$3.924 billion CAD (2019)
- Number of employees: 127,000 (2020)
- Subsidiaries: Sobeys; Crombie REIT; Safeway; Farm Boy; FreshCo; Foodland; Needs Convenience; Lawtons; IGA / IGA Extra; Marché Bonichoix; Marché Tradition; Rachelle-Béry; Thrifty Foods; Pete's Frootique; Big 8 Beverages; Longo's
- Rating: BB+
- Website: www.empireco.ca

Empire Company Limited is a Canadian conglomerate engaged mostly in food retail and corporate investments. Founded in 1963, the company is headquartered in Stellarton, Nova Scotia and owns the Sobeys supermarket chain. In total, the company owns, affiliates or franchises more than 1,500 stores; in addition to Sobeys, brands include Safeway, IGA, Foodland, Farm Boy, FreshCo, Thrifty Foods and Lawtons Drug. In 1978, it formed the Empire Theatres subsidiary, originally owning a few cinemas in Atlantic Canada; in 2013, Empire Company sold the cross-Canada Empire Theatres subsidiary.

Pierre St-Laurent is the president and CEO of Empire Company, appointed in November 2025.

== Acquisitions ==
Empire Company has a long history of acquisitions:

- 1976 Lawton's Drug Stores Limited, which operated 18 stores in Nova Scotia.
- November 1980 – July 1981 Empire acquires Sobey Holdings Limited, gaining a 50.97% stake in the company.
- February 1983 Empire ups its ownership of Hannaford Bros. Co., an American food retailer, to 25% (Sold in 2000)
- June 1987 Empire buys the remaining 49.03% of Sobeys, making it an entirely owned subsidiary. (Sold in 1998, re-bought in 2007)
- 1987 Empire buys out its partner in Empire Theatres, turning it into an entirely owned subsidiary.
- May 1988 Empire buys a 25% stake in Provigo.
- 1988 Empire acquires an additional 22% stake in Wajax, resulting in a total ownership of 45%.
- June 1989 Empire re-purchases the outstanding share of Atlantic Shopping Centres, making it an entirely owned subsidiary.
- December 1993 Empire Real Estate buys 64% of Halifax Developments, Ltd; making it an entirely owned subsidiary.
- December 1998 Empire buys Oshawa Group for $1.5 billion.
- January 2001 Empire Real Estate buys a 35.7% stake in Genstar Developmental Partnership for $29 million.
- February 2004 Sobey's acquires Commisso's Food Markets, and Empire Real Estate acquires Commisso's real estate for a total of $103.5 million.
- September 2005 Empire Theatres acquires 27 more theatres.
- August 2006 Sobey's acquires Achille de la Chevrotière Ltée, including its grocery chain of about 25 stores in Quebec and Ontario. This costs $79.2 million.
- July 15, 2007 Empire re-buys the remaining outstanding Sobey's share, making it once again an entirely owned subsidiary.
- September 2007 Sobeys buys Thrifty Foods for $256.6 million.
- 2011 Sobeys purchases 236 retail gas locations for $214.9 million in Québec and Atlantic Canada.
- June 2013 Empire buys all of Safeway Canada's stores for $5.8 billion
- September 2018 Empire announces intent to buy Farm Boy stores in an $800 million deal.
- March 2021 Empire announces it will buy 51% stake in Longo's and its Grocery Gateway e-commerce business for $357 million. The deal is expected to close in the first quarter of Empire's 2022 financial year.

== Sales of Subsidiaries/Interests ==
- 1998 Empire sells 38% of Sobeys, putting it out on the public stock exchange.
- 2000 Empire sells its 25% stake in Hannaford Bros Co for $1.03 billion.
- March 2002 Empire sells Serca Foodservice to SYSCO for $411 million.
- June 2005 When Wajax became an income trust, Empire sold 2.875 million shares for $50.8 million.
- 2006 Empire sells 44 properties to Crombie REIT.
- April 2008 Empire sells another 61 properties to Crombie REIT
- 2011 Empire sells its remaining share of Wajax.
- June 2013 Empire announces the sale of Empire Theatres to Cineplex Entertainment and Landmark Cinemas. The aggregate gross purchase price paid to Empire Theatres in the two transactions was approximately $248 million in cash.
- October 2013 Sale of Empire Theatres to Cineplex and Landmark is complete.
- August 2013 Sobeys sells the land of 68 Safeway locations to Crombie REIT for $900 million.
- Oct/Nov/Dec 2013 Sobeys announces the planned sale of 23 of its stores in Alberta in preparation to the Safeway acquisition; this move was required in order to satisfy the Competition Bureau.
