= Safeway (Canada) =

Canadian supermarket chain owned by Empire Company Limited

- The 2005–present logo
- Type: Subsidiary
- Industry: Retail
- Founded: 1929
- Headquarters: Calgary, Alberta, Canada
- Key people: Michael B. Medline, President & CEO
- Owner: Empire Company
- Parent: Safeway Inc. (1929–2013); Sobeys Inc. (2013–present)
- Website: safeway.ca

Safeway (also referred to as Canada Safeway) is a Canadian supermarket chain that operates 135 full-service locations, mostly in the country's Western provinces. It was established in 1929 as a subsidiary of the American Safeway chain before being sold in 2013 to Sobeys, a division of the conglomerate Empire Company and Canada's second-largest supermarket chain. Though independent from the American company, it continues to use the Safeway name and logo.

Safeway's headquarters are located in Calgary, Alberta. It is a participant in the voluntary Scanner Price Accuracy Code managed by the Retail Council of Canada.

== History ==
=== Early years ===
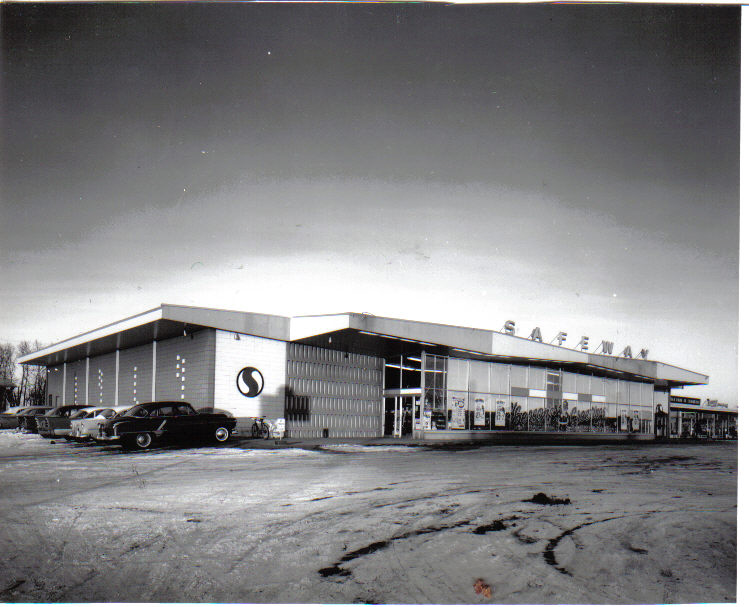
A Safeway in Sherwood Park, Alberta, Canada, 1961

Safeway Inc. established its Canadian operation as Canada Safeway Limited with nine stores in 1929 with headquarters in Winnipeg. In 1935, it acquired the 179 Canadian Piggly Wiggly stores. In 1969, Safeway entered the Toronto market by opening new stores, rather than by acquisition. The firm ultimately failed against entrenched competition in this market.

=== 1970s and 1980s ===
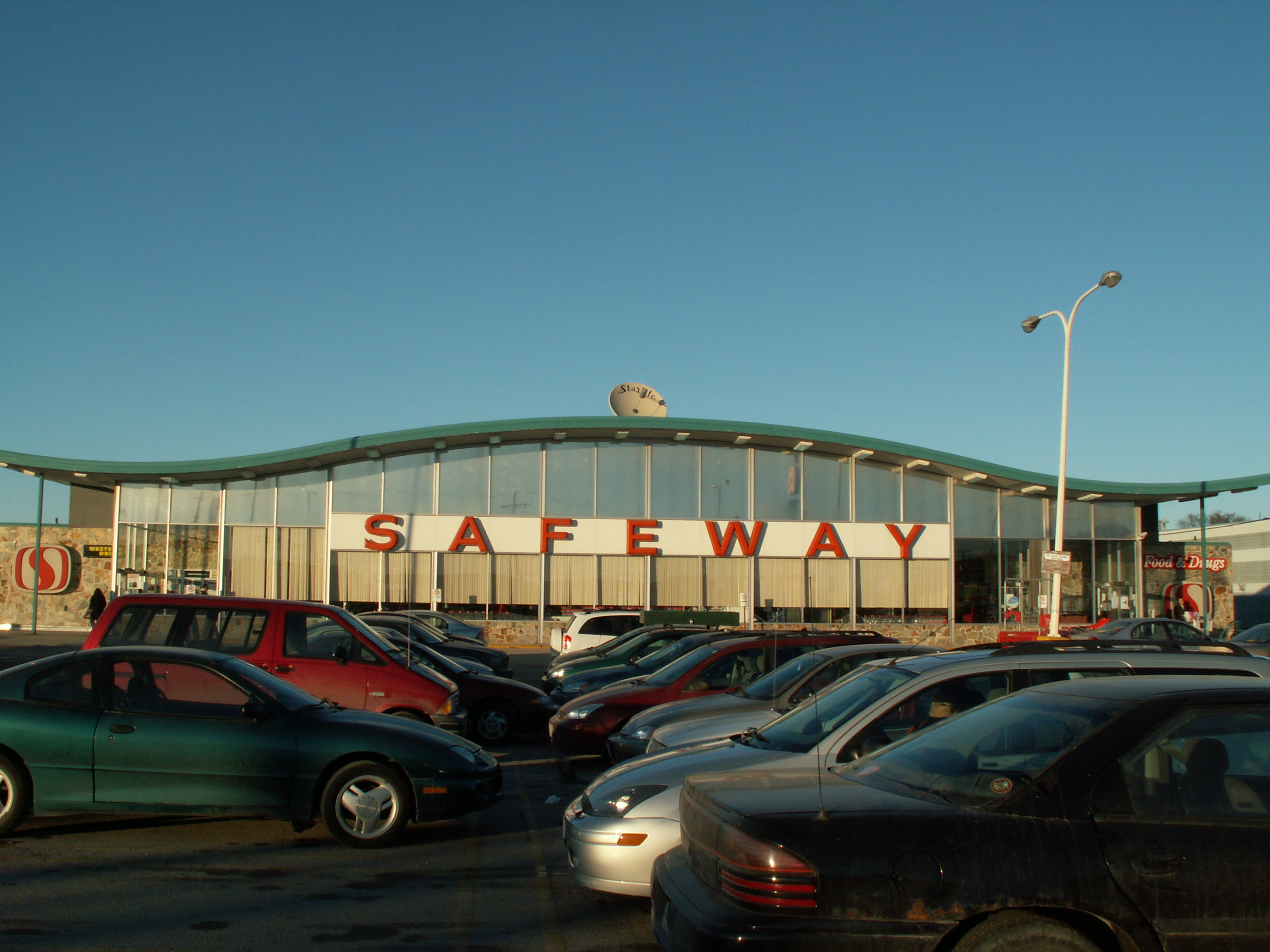
Safeway at Ellice Avenue and Wall Street in Winnipeg, Manitoba and closed in 2008

Canada Safeway dominated the grocery store landscape in Western Canada in the 1970s and 1980s. The company controlled 80 percent of the grocery market in Alberta in the 1970s, causing the government to accuse Safeway of having a monopoly on the supermarket business, resulting in unnecessarily high food prices. A judicial inquiry restricted the number of stores Safeway could open, and forced the company to close or sell some locations to competitors like IGA. Some IGA stores housed in former Safeway buildings have operated successfully for decades, others ceased operation in recent years.

In October 1986, the Canadian Press reported that Safeway Canada took an $8 million loss by closing a prime store at West Edmonton Mall, which, at that time, was the world's largest shopping centre. It was the fifth store Safeway had closed in west Edmonton.

Safeway also opened other supermarkets under the Food Barn and Food for Less names in Alberta; and the Safeway Superstore name in British Columbia. Food Barn was similar to Safeway in terms of selection and prices, but the decor resembled a warehouse the size of an average Safeway store. In the mid-1980s, the company launched Food for Less in the Alberta cities of Edmonton and Calgary, as a big-box, discount food store chain meant to compete with the Loblaws-owned Real Canadian Superstore, which had expanded to western Canada. Most Food for Less and Real Canadian Superstore locations were constructed within blocks of each other. Upon the Real Canadian Superstore's opening, Loblaws produced television commercials with an aggressive tone, taking direct aim at Safeway's higher prices. One ad featured a man holding a rolled-up Safeway newspaper flyer, while promising viewers they would find lower prices at the Real Canadian Superstore. While prices at Food for Less were meant to compete with those of Real Canadian Superstore, and be lower than Safeway, this was not always true.

In late 1987, Safeway acquired the 26 Woodward's Food Floors, which operated in the western Canadian provinces of British Columbia (16 stores) and Alberta (10). These stores were later rebranded as Woodward's World of Food.

Safeway closed Food Barn or re-branded stores as Safeway before the decade ended.

=== 1990s ===
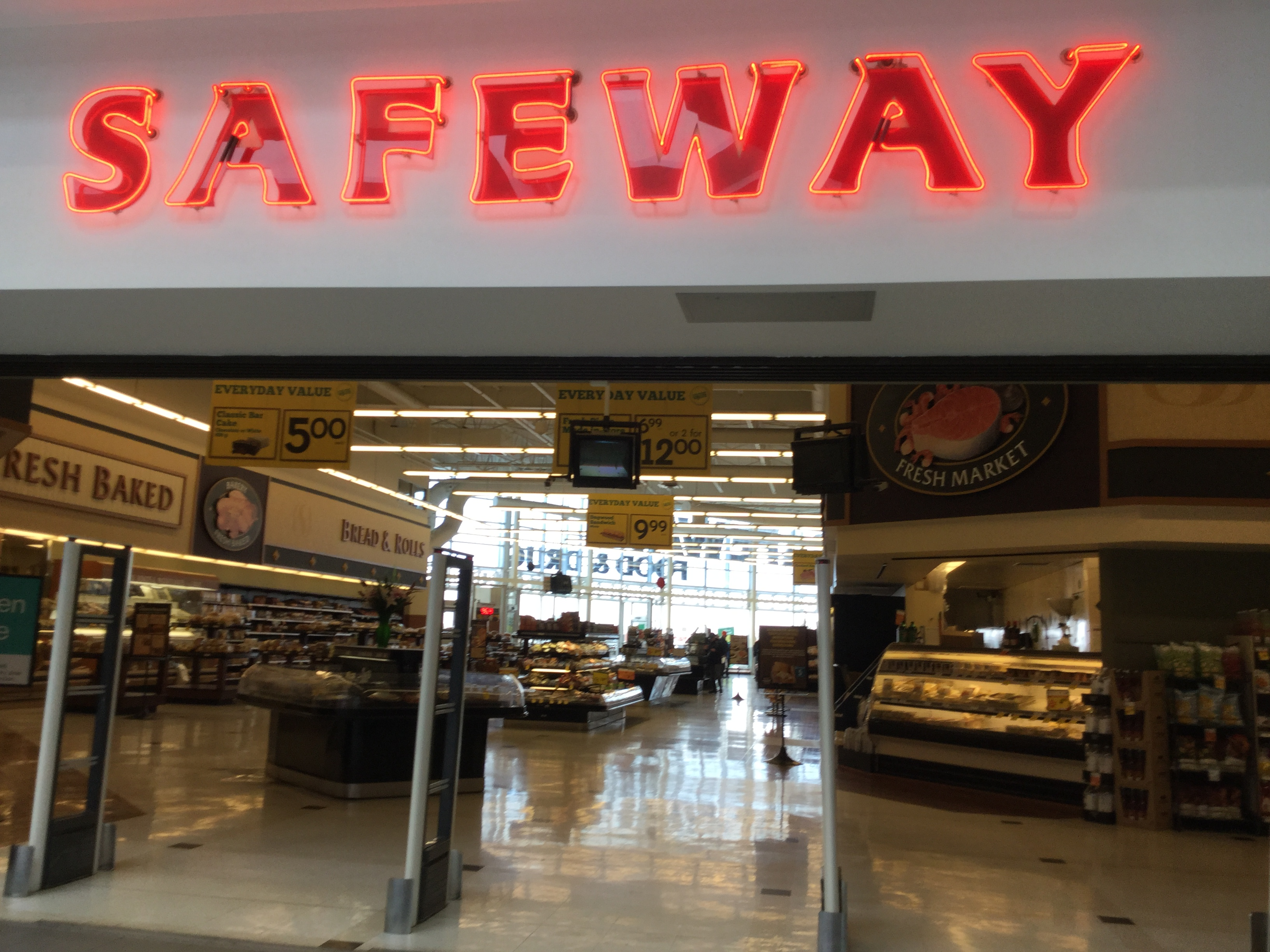
Safeway at Medicine Hat Mall in Medicine Hat, Alberta

In western Canada shortly before the Hudson's Bay Company purchased and then closed the Woodward's Department Store chain in 1993, Safeway rebranded Woodward's Food Floors and World of Food stores to Safeway stores, though the interior of some locations kept the World of Food decor for several years, before being renovated into full-fledged Safeways. The Woodward's brand name vanished from the Canadian retail landscape as a result.

Canada Safeway gained a reputation for high prices.

Safeway's new commitment to lower prices ignited a price war between supermarkets, much to the delight of consumers, that lasted for several weeks. However, Safeway's prices slowly crept back up as months passed, and within a couple of years, it abandoned the red arrow campaign altogether, and once again, Safeway regained its reputation for high prices.

Club Card used by Canada Safeway.

In the late 1990s, the company launched a Safeway Club Card loyalty program. The company said the card would provide discounts to customers more conveniently than clipping coupons. However, months after the Club Card's launch, the company introduced coupons again. The card was discontinued on April 4, 2014 by Sobeys, who now owns Canada Safeway; however, the card can still be used at Safeway stores in the United States.

In 1999, the Safeway chain began selling gasoline at some of its new stores.

=== Acquisition by Sobeys ===
On June 12, 2013, Sobeys announced it would acquire Safeway's operations in Canada for CDN$5.8 billion, subject to regulatory approval.

As a condition of the deal imposed by the Competition Bureau in October 2013, Sobeys was required to sell 23 of its retail locations to other companies. Sobeys sold 29 of its locations (18 of them being Safeway locations)—15 to Overwaitea Food Group (particularly in British Columbia and Alberta) and 14 to affiliates of Federated Co-operatives (particularly in Alberta, Saskatchewan, and Manitoba) for $430 million in total.

In January 2018, Sobeys announced that they would be closing ten stores in Metro Vancouver, citing that the locations were underperforming. Several of the locations were later reopened under the FreshCo banner. In 2019, it was announced that another six Safeway locations in British Columbia would be converted to FreshCo in 2020. In Alberta six Safeway stores will rebrand to FreshCo in 2021.

== Current operations ==
Safeway in Oakridge Park, Vancouver. This store include Chinese signage

Safeway in Shops at New West shopping centre

Safeway has 134 full service grocery stores mostly located in Western Canada: 173 in-store pharmacies and 62 fuel stations, 10 liquor stores, four primary distribution centres and 12 manufacturing facilities.

Safeway parent Empire Co. has been converting several stores in Alberta to the discount FreshCo brand as part of an expansion of that brand across Western Canada, with a planned 65 stores to come under the FreshCo brand through the conversion of some Safeway and Sobeys stores along with the opening of new stores.

== Petroleum ==
Safeway has gas stations at some stores. Following the acquisition of the chain by Sobeys, ten Safeway gas stations in Winnipeg and Moose Jaw were converted to Shell as a pilot project. Sobeys also owns Shell-branded gas stations in Quebec, Atlantic Canada, and Alberta.

== See also ==
- List of supermarket chains in Canada
