= IGA (Canada) =

Canadian retail chain

- Logo used in Canada since January 1990. Before that, the international IGA logo was used.
- Company type: Subsidiary
- Industry: Retail
- Founders: Independent retailer owners
- Area served: Canada (primarily Quebec)
- Parent: Sobeys
- Website: iga.net

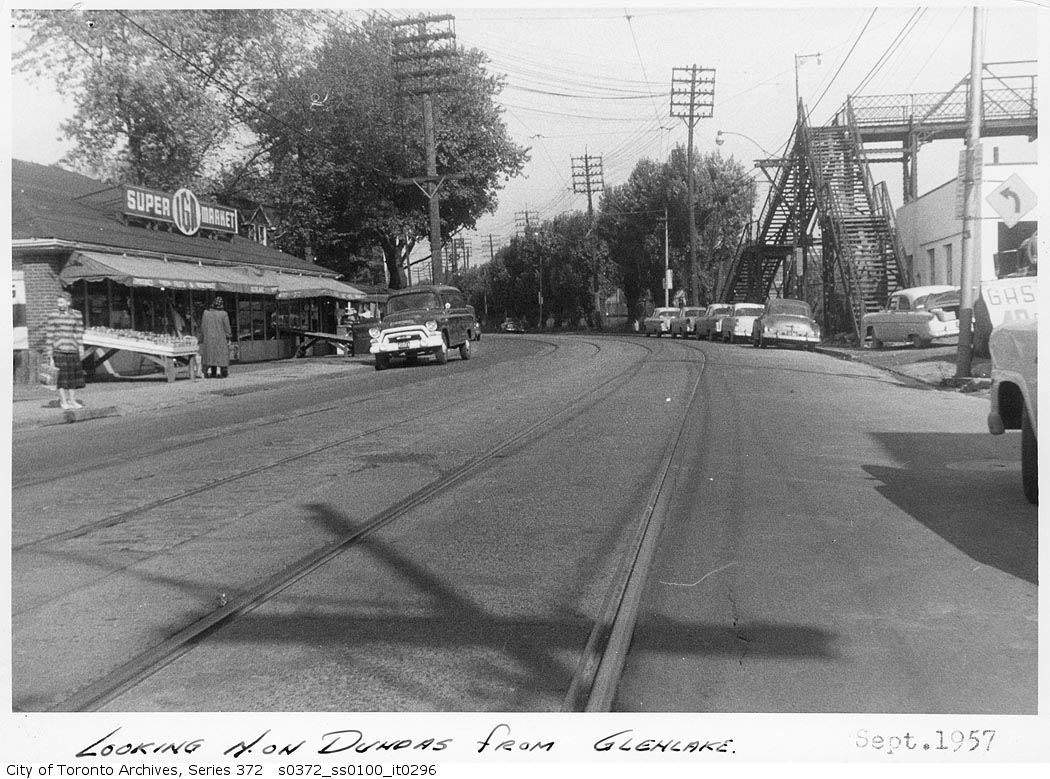
IGA store (left) on Dundas Street in Toronto, September 1957.

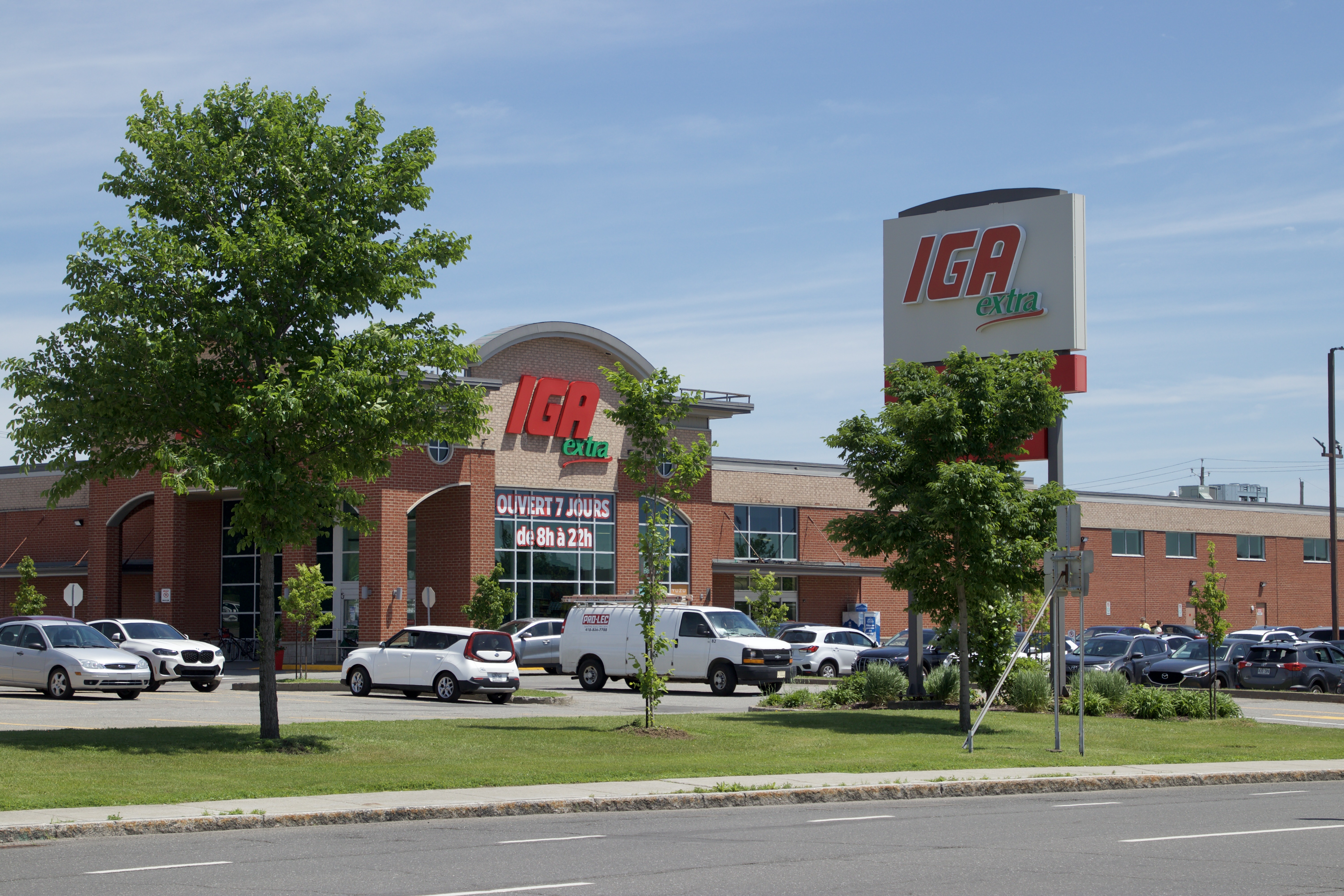
IGA store in Victoriaville, June 2025.

IGA is a group of independent grocers in Canada supplied by Sobeys, which franchises the name from IGA, Inc. Acquired by Sobeys as part of its purchase of the Oshawa Group Ltd., it now operates primarily in Quebec.

The IGA operations in Atlantic Canada were sold to Loblaw Companies Limited (except for Edmundston, Shediac and Dieppe which runs as IGA-Co-op, previously acquired by Sobeys New Brunswick) and were restructured under its existing brands. The company-owned stores west of Quebec now mainly operate under the Sobeys banner. There are, however, many IGA stores still operating in Manitoba, Saskatchewan and Alberta, with one opening in Emerald Park, Saskatchewan in 2016.

IGA Extra locations are larger and carry a wider variety of general merchandise, more akin to the hypermarket model. They include a pharmacy, large bakery, a bank, a bistro, a post office, and a larger selection of food items. IGA Extra launched in the early 2000s to take the place of Sobeys locations in the Quebec City and Montreal areas. In 2015, several Co-op Atlantic stores became IGA stores supplied by Sobeys Quebec after Co-op decided to exit the grocery store business.

In Quebec, IGA also operates smaller supermarkets. These include Bonichoix and Tradition (a brand introduced in 1999).

In British Columbia, except for the towns of Fort Nelson, Chetwynd and Golden, IGA stores (previously Marketplace IGA) are, for the most part, independently owned and are operated by Georgia Main Food Group.

== See also ==
- List of supermarket chains
- List of supermarket chains in Canada
