= Sobeys =

Canadian supermarket chain

Sobeys Inc.
- Type: Subsidiary
- Industry: Retail
- Founded: 1907; 119 years ago Stellarton, Nova Scotia, Canada
- Founder: John W. Sobey
- Headquarters: Stellarton, Nova Scotia
- Key people: Pierre St-Laurent (president & CEO)
- Products: Bakery, dairy, delicatessen, frozen foods, general grocery, meat and poultry, produce, seafood, and snacks.
- Number of employees: 123,000 (2019)
- Parent: Empire Company
- Subsidiaries: Big 8 Beverages; Farm Boy; Foodland; Freshco / Chalo! FreshCo; IGA / IGA Extra; Lawtons; Marché Bonichoix; Marché Tradition; Boni-Soir; Dépanneur Voisin; Needs Convenience; Pete's Frootique; Rachelle-Béry; Safeway; Sobeys / Sobeys Extra; Thrifty Foods; Sobeys Liquor; Safeway Liquor; Thrifty Foods Liquor; Voilà
- Website: corporate.sobeys.com

Sobeys Inc. is a national supermarket chain in Canada with over 1,500 stores operating under a variety of banners. Headquartered in Stellarton, Nova Scotia, it operates stores in all ten provinces and accumulated sales of more than C$25.1 billion in the fiscal 2019 operating year. It is a wholly owned subsidiary of Empire Company Limited, a Canadian business conglomerate.

It is a participant in the voluntary Scanner Price Accuracy Code managed by the Retail Council of Canada.

== History ==
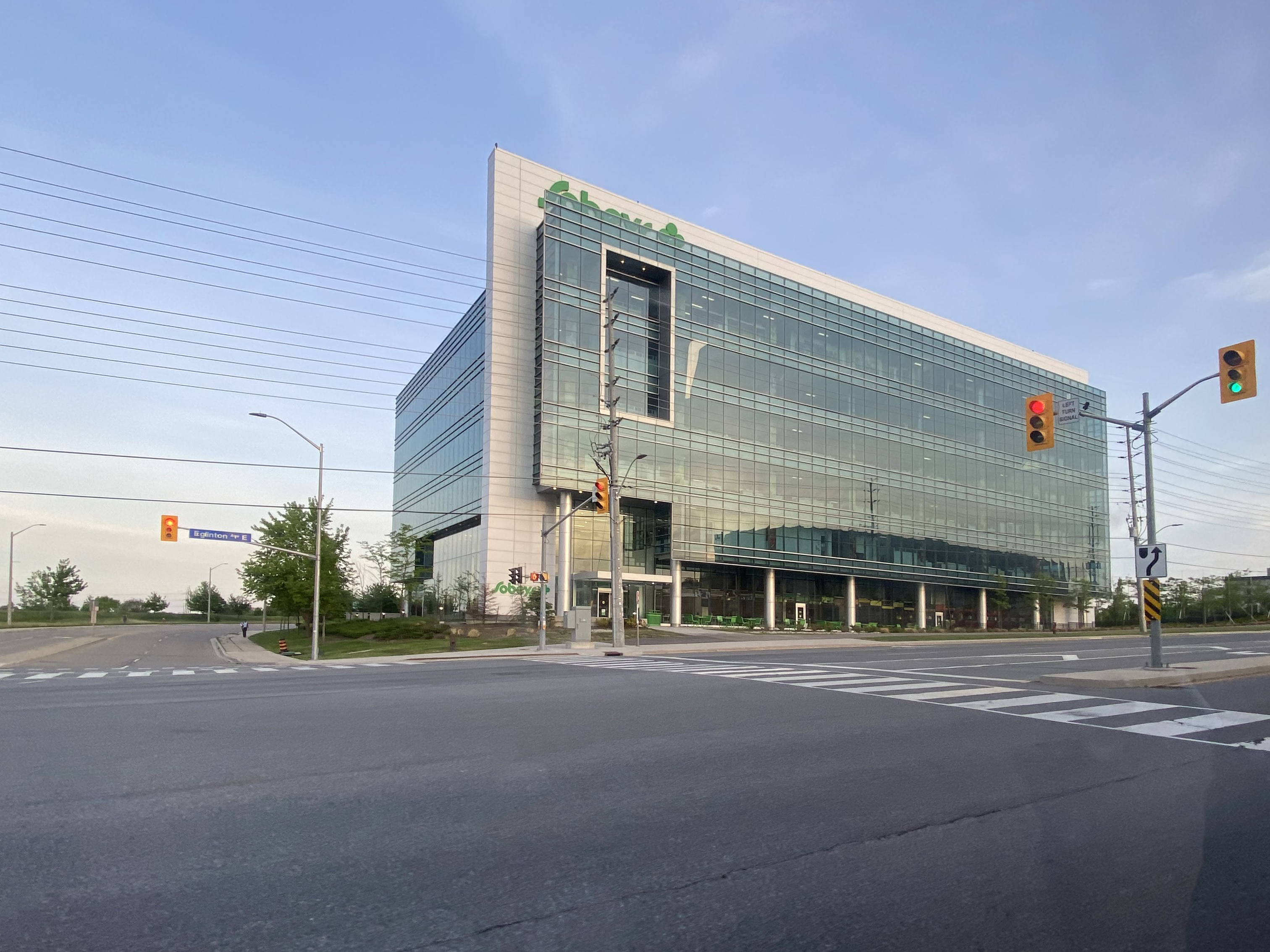
Sobeys corporate office in Mississauga, Ontario

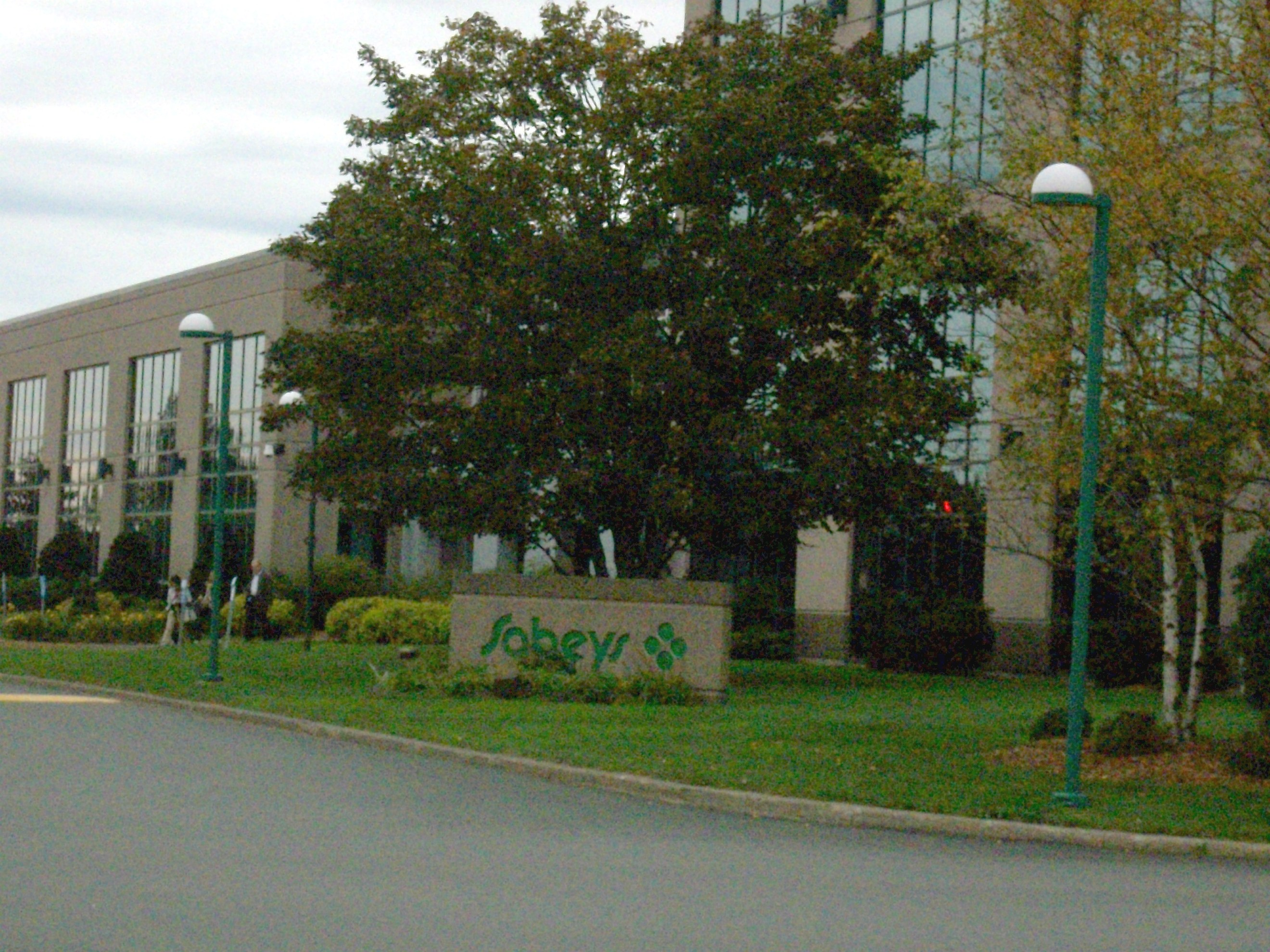
Sobeys corporate office in Stellarton, Nova Scotia

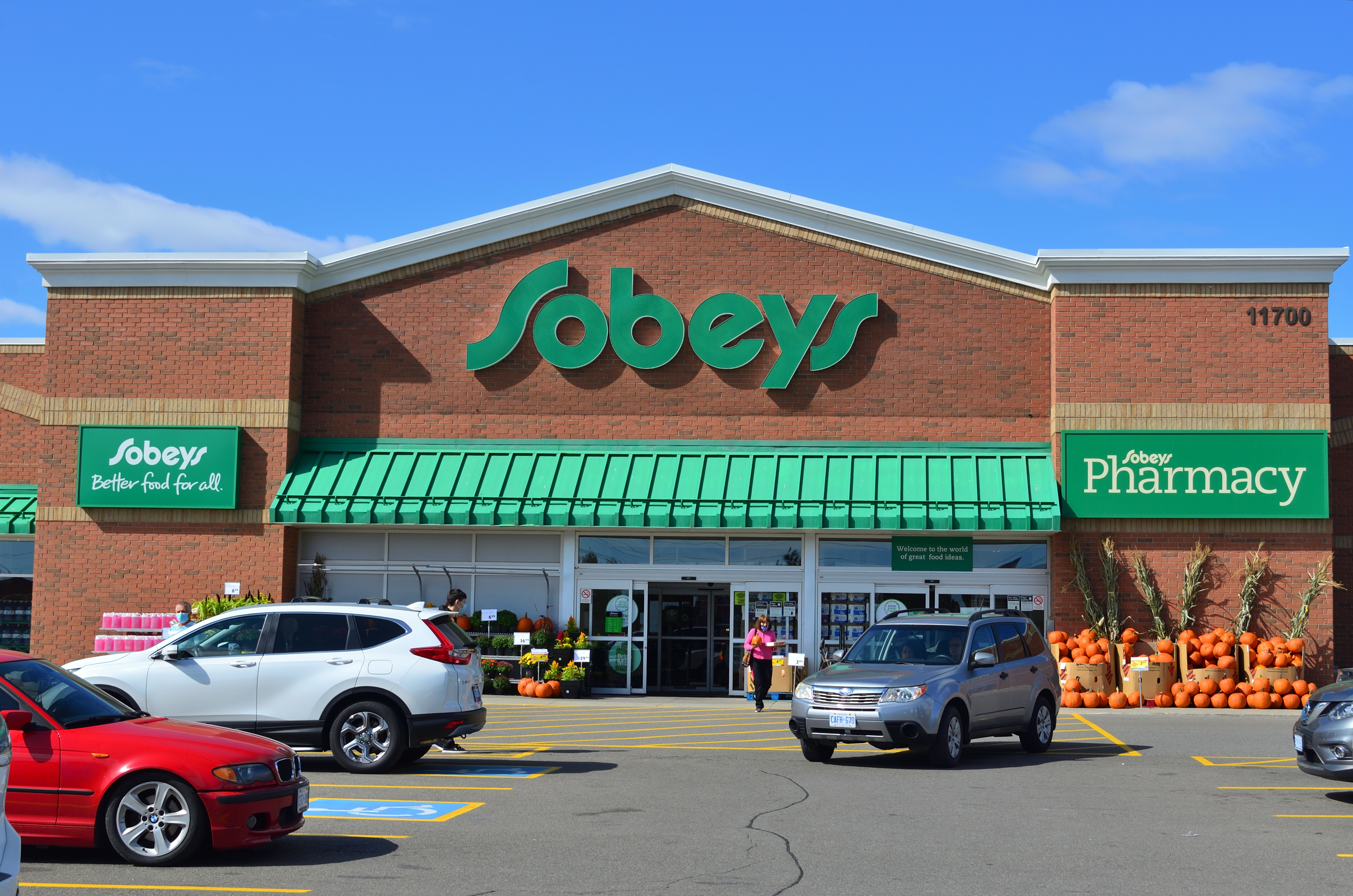
Sobeys in Richmond Hill, Ontario

Sobeys was founded in Stellarton, Nova Scotia by John W. Sobey, a former carpenter, in 1907 as a meat delivery business.

In 1921, Sobey's son, Frank, became a partner of the company and added six new grocery stores serving the Pictou County and Antigonish County regions. In 1946, Sobey's opened its first supermarket in New Glasgow after purchasing the operations to Barker Store. By this time, Frank was the first president of J. W. Sobey Stores Limited. By late 1977, Sobeys had 65 store locations.

The chain eventually expanded throughout Atlantic Canada. During most of the second half of the 20th century, it was the region's dominant grocer. In the 1980s, Sobeys expanded into southern Ontario, challenging Loblaws on its "home turf", thereby igniting what came to be a nationwide battle for market supremacy.

Sobeys had significant stakes in New England grocer Hannaford, Quebec grocer Provigo (which owned California grocer Petrini's), and US wholesaler Nash Finch Company until the 1990s. In 1998, Sobeys became the second-largest grocer in the country after purchasing the Oshawa Group, owners of the IGA franchise across Canada, along with several regional chains in Ontario, in addition to various food service and wholesale companies.

In 2002, Sobeys undertook major changes in its store design and customer service policies with the introduction of "Ready to serve". This initiative was reportedly an attempt to emulate the successful moves of the Publix supermarket chain in the southern United States.

In 2005, Sobeys lost a bidding war with Quebec-based Metro to acquire A&P Canada, operator of several Ontario supermarket chains. The all-cash offer made by Sobeys was reportedly the highest bid for the chain, but the U.S. parent, The Great Atlantic and Pacific Tea Company, ultimately accepted Metro's $1.7 billion cash-and-stock offer. It is also suggested that the Sobey family was unwilling to cede any control to the Tengelmann Group, the ultimate parent company of A&P at the time. Though Sobeys remained the second largest grocery chain in Canada, it was the third place chain in most of the provinces outside the Atlantic region, and the successful purchase of A&P Canada would have helped to bolster its position in Ontario.

In 2007, Sobeys announced a $253 million takeover offer for the Thrifty Foods chain in British Columbia.

In September 2011, Sobeys' wholesale division signed a long-term distribution agreement with American retailer Target for the supply of select food and grocery products to its Canadian stores. In March 2012, Sobeys acquired 236 Shell gas station locations in Quebec and Atlantic Canada.

In June 2013, Sobeys announced the purchase of Safeway's Canadian operations for $5.8 billion, subject to regulatory approval. The acquisition added Safeway's 214 locations, primarily located in Western Canada, to its portfolio. As a condition of the deal imposed by the Competition Bureau in October 2013, Sobeys was required to sell 23 of its retail locations to other companies. Sobeys sold 29 of its locations, which included 18 Safeway stores. Fifteen were sold to Overwaitea Food Group (particularly in British Columbia and Alberta), and fourteen were sold to affiliates of Federated Co-operatives (particularly in Alberta, Saskatchewan, and Manitoba) for $430 million in total. In June 2014, Sobeys announced that it would, in the wake of the Safeway purchase, close 50 of its "underperforming" locations. The stores affected were primarily in Western Canada, although some in Ontario and the Atlantic region were also affected. In 2015, Sobeys acquired certain assets and select liabilities of Co-op Atlantic.

In July 2016, Empire Company CEO Marc Poulin abruptly left the company after Sobeys reported a $942.6 million loss, which was credited to difficulties in integrating the Safeway chain into Sobeys overall operations. The Financial Post also reported that changes made by Sobeys, including the discontinuation of its popular loyalty program, the replacement of Safeway's house brands with Sobeys' brands, reports of poorly stocked inventories at Safeway locations, had impacted the chain's customer loyalty.

In January 2018, Sobeys announced an agreement with Ocado to open an e-commerce grocery fulfilment centre in Toronto during late 2020. In contrast, Sobeys-owned Thrifty Foods and IGA use their stores as fulfilment centres for online orders.

In late January 2018, Sobeys announced that it would, in the wake of the Safeway purchase, close an additional 10 of its "underperforming" locations. The stores affected were in the Fraser Valley Area of British Columbia in Western Canada, and were closed on May 5 with the exception of one of the ten stores that were closed on July 28. Some of the stores affected would reopen as FreshCo. As part of the FreshCo expansion in Western Canada, 22 locations have been confirmed, including the first two Chalo! FreshCo stores out West in Surrey, B.C.

In July 2019, Sobeys announced it will be switching from plastic to paper grocery bags in all its stores by the end of 2020.

In September 2023, David Sobey, former chief executive and chair of the Sobeys Inc. grocery store chain, died at the age of 92.

== Private label brands ==
The Sobeys private label lineup has had several names. They were introduced under the "Sobeys" name, and were renamed "Our Best" in the late 1990s. After its purchase of Oshawa Group, Sobeys dropped "Our Best" in favour of Oshawa's "Our Compliments" brand.

In 2005, Sobeys shortened the name to "Compliments". At the same time, it expanded the brand's lineup to compete with labels such as Loblaw's President's Choice brand. From 2007–2010, they offered "Compliments Junior", aimed at children and co-branded with The Walt Disney Company.

In late 2009, lower-price store-brand products were transitioned from "Compliments Value" to the "Signal" brand, which Sobeys used in the 1990s for a range of similar products. After the Oshawa Group merger, Sobeys dropped that name for Oshawa's "Smart Choice" label, and later for "Compliments Value".

Private-label soft drinks are branded "Big 8" in Atlantic Canada. Elsewhere, soft drinks bear the Compliments brand.

== Banners ==
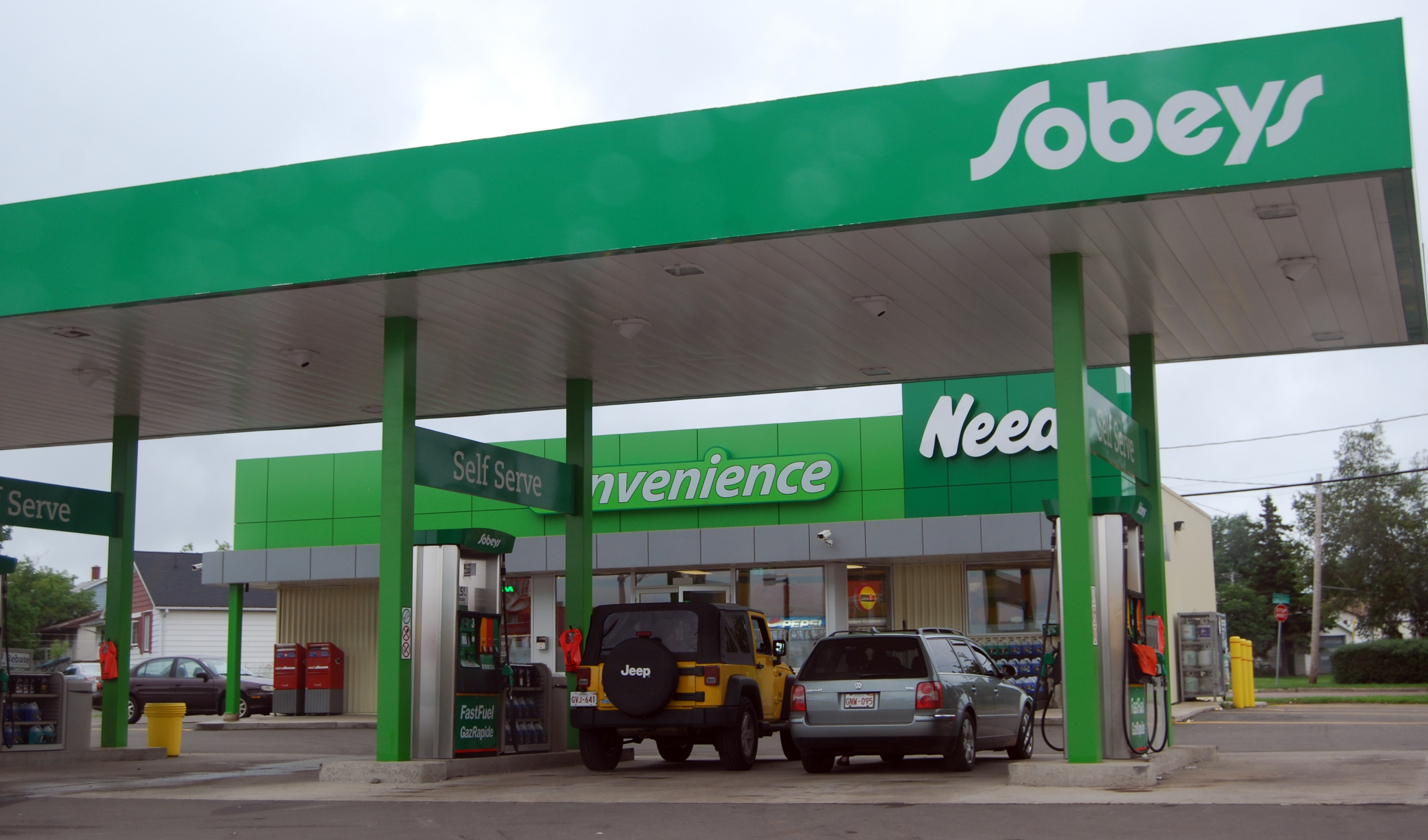
Needs convenience/Sobeys Gas Bar

In addition to the flagship Sobeys banner, the company operates supermarkets under a number of other banners:

=== IGA ===
IGA and IGA Extra are the main banners in the province of Quebec. There are also 35 Sobeys-owned IGA stores in Western Canada. An IGA store is also in mainly French-speaking Edmundston, New Brunswick, and an IGA Extra (a rebranded Sobeys location) is in Caraquet and Campbellton, New Brunswick. MarketPlace IGA stores in British Columbia are independently owned by H.Y. Louie, parent company of London Drugs. These stores also carry Compliments products. Sobeys has reportedly made unsuccessful attempts to purchase the MarketPlace chain.

At the time of the Sobeys takeover of the Oshawa Group, all IGA locations in Atlantic Canada were purchased separately by Loblaws for competition reasons. Loblaws converted these IGA locations to their own banners.

=== Safeway ===
In June 2013, Sobeys announced its intent to acquire Safeway's Canadian stores for $5.8 billion.

=== Foodland ===
The banner's logo as of 2024.

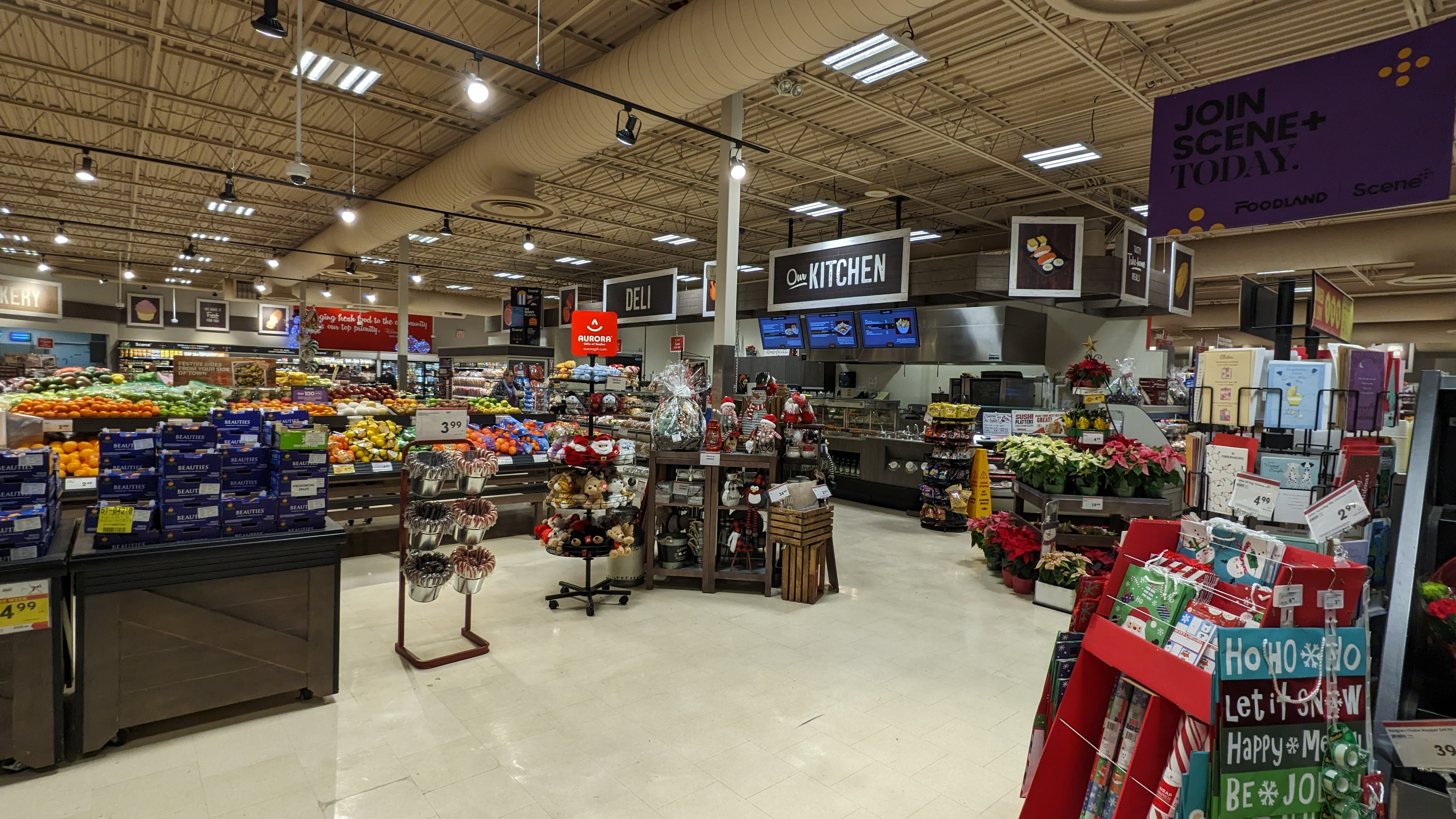
The interior of a typical Foodland grocery store in Hagersville, Ontario.

Sobeys operates the smaller grocery store Foodland chain, mainly in rural areas of Newfoundland and Labrador, Nova Scotia, New Brunswick and Ontario. In 2022, a flyer for the supermarket was criticized for featuring farm owners who allegedly mistreated migrant workers from Jamaica. Other smaller grocery stores are operated under the Tradition Markets banner in Quebec and the Food Town banner in Western Canada.

=== Thrifty Foods ===
Sobeys operates Thrifty Foods, a chain of 26 grocery stores with an online grocery service based in Victoria, British Columbia.

=== FreshCo and Chalo FreshCo ===
In 2010, Sobeys launched FreshCo, a discount banner. The pilot stores are rebranded Price Chopper outlets in Southern Ontario. FreshCo uses a franchise model and the stores are independently owned.

In April 2019, FreshCo launched in Western Canada, opening three stores in British Columbia and two in Winnipeg, as well as two Chalo! FreshCo stores in British Columbia. They have since announced additional locations as part of its expansion into Western Canada. The Western Canadian stores are branded with the distinctive new FreshCo 2.0 look and feel, and an updated merchandising program that is also being used with FreshCo stores in Ontario. There are 7 locations that have been rebranded as Chalo FreshCo in areas with large South Asian Canadian communities.

=== Sobeys Urban Fresh ===
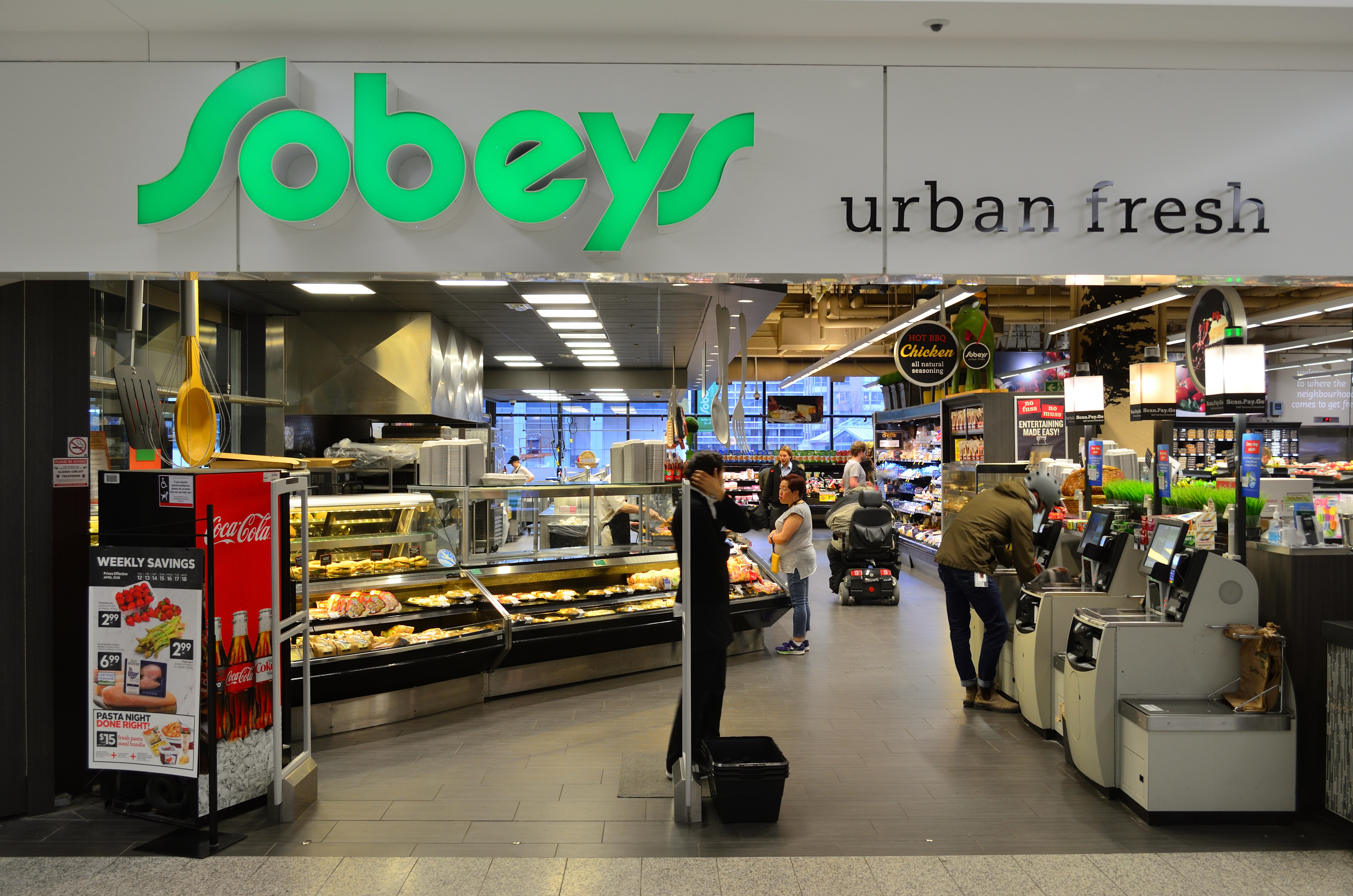
Sobeys Urban Fresh in downtown Toronto

In 2008, a uniquely designed urban-format Sobeys was opened in downtown Edmonton. It was closed in the summer of 2014; a Sobeys representative said, "It just wasn't financially viable for us to operate." Other Edmonton locations have been proposed, including College Heights and Cloverdale; as well as locations in Calgary and Vancouver.

=== Sobeys Extra ===
In November 2013, Sobeys unveiled its first "Sobeys Extra" store in Burlington, Ontario. The newly refurbished 58,000-sq.-ft. store is the first launched under the Sobeys Extra banner in Canada.

=== Former grocery banners ===
- Commisso's Food Markets in Ontario were rebranded Sobeys and Price Chopper.
- Food City from the Oshawa Group in Ontario were mainly rebranded Price Chopper.
- Garden Market IGA stores in Western Canada were rebranded Sobeys.
- Dutch Boy, a chain in the Kitchener-Waterloo area of Ontario, was rebranded Sobeys.
- Knechtel, a small-market grocery store chain under Oshawa Group, was rebranded Foodland.
- Lofood, a small discount grocery store, was rebranded Price Chopper.
- Calbeck's, an independent chain acquired in 1990, was rebranded Sobeys, Price Chopper and Foodland.

=== Other Sobeys-owned enterprises ===
The company owns the Needs, Sobeys Express, and BoniChoix convenience store chains, and the Lawtons drug store chain in Atlantic Canada. They also own the wholesale food distribution company TRA Atlantic. The company delivers products to retail outlets, such as convenience stores and gas stations, throughout Atlantic Canada. TRA also operates the Kwik-Way and Clover Farm convenience store chains.

At some Sobeys locations, tobacco products are sold in a separate Sobeys-owned store called Griffins. They are a part of the Sobeys store but only accessible from the outside, due to provincial laws prohibiting stores with pharmacies from selling tobacco products. A number of Sobeys and Needs stores in Nova Scotia and New Brunswick have a gas bar branded Sobeys Fast Fuel.

Sobeys Express stores (called IGA Express in Quebec) feature produce and take-out meals alongside items commonly found in convenience stores. Some are operated as the convenience store for Sobeys-operated Shell stations.

On September 24, 2018, Empire Co. Ltd., Sobeys' parent, announced it had signed an agreement to purchase Farm Boy, an Ontario chain of 26 supermarkets, for $800-million. Farm Boy founder Jean-Louis Bellemare and his co-CEO Jeff York will continue in their roles, since the company will operate as a separate entity. The move allows Farm Boy to continue with aggressive expansion plans into Southwestern Ontario, particularly the Toronto region. The number of stores was expected to double over the next five years.

== Loyalty programs ==
=== Club Sobeys (1990s–2015) ===
Club Sobeys was a loyalty program at the chain's Atlantic Canada locations offered during the 1990s, prior to Sobeys securing the regional rights to Air Miles through the Oshawa Group merger. As the company expanded its operations in Ontario and Western Canada in the 2000s, Sobeys introduced the Club Sobeys program in those markets. It was known as Club Thrifty Foods in the British Columbia locations of that chain, after it was acquired.

In the Club Sobeys region, Sobeys introduced, in partnership with Citibank Canada, a Club Sobeys MasterCard credit card. These card accounts were later transferred to Bank of Montreal, which also introduced the BMO Sobeys Air Miles MasterCard in Atlantic Canada (and IGA Air Miles MasterCard in Quebec). Following the transition from Club Sobeys to Air Miles in 2014, all Club Sobeys credit cards were converted to BMO Sobeys Air Miles MasterCards, which were then replaced by standard BMO Air Miles Mastercards a few years later.

=== Air Miles (2015–2022) ===
In early 2015, Sobeys announced that the Air Miles loyalty program would be extended into Ontario on March 27, 2015, replacing the Club Sobeys loyalty program. This was a result of a new agreement between Air Miles and Metro, which extended Metro's partnership but gave up its exclusivity in the grocery category in Ontario.

When Sobeys became an Air Miles partner, its partnership was restricted to Quebec and Atlantic Canada—the same territory rights held by Oshawa Group prior to its acquisition by Sobeys in 1998. Air Miles had partnered with Safeway for all of its locations across western Canada and northwestern Ontario, while A&P Canada (later Metro) had the rights in the rest of Ontario. In June 2014, shortly after its acquisition of Safeway Canada (Air Miles' original grocery partner), Sobeys announced plans to expand its Air Miles participation to Sobeys, IGA, Foodland and Thrifty Foods stores in Western Canada and Northwestern Ontario on September 12, 2014, replacing Club Sobeys and Club Thrifty Foods in those areas.

In 2022, 95 accrued reward miles (with each mile earned for every $20 spent) could be redeemed for $10 off of purchases.

=== Scene+ (2022–present) ===
In June 2022, Empire Company announced that it would end its participation in Air Miles and switch to the Cineplex Entertainment and Scotiabank-owned Scene+ program at its grocery and pharmacy chains. Empire will also hold an ownership stake in the company. The transition began with Atlantic Canada on August 11, 2022, to be followed by a nationwide rollout to Quebec (IGA), Ontario and Western Canada through late 2022 to early 2023.

== Controversies ==
=== Bread price-fixing ===
In 2018, Sobeys was implicated in a 14-16 year long national price-fixing cartel with other Canadian supermarkets and the bread supplier Canada Bread. Sobeys, along with other retailers, allegedly conspired to fix the price of bread and arrange when increases would be made. Canada Bread pled guilty to four counts of price fixing in July 2023. Sobeys has denied any culpability, calling the allegations "irresponsible"; no charges have been filed to date against Sobeys.

=== Animal welfare ===
In 2021, Sobeys stated that it would not meet its 2016 commitment to transition to a 100% cage-free egg supply chain by 2025. As of May 2026, the company has not published an updated plan or timeline for implementing the animal welfare policy. As a result, Sobeys has faced public criticism for failing to keep its cage-free commitment.

In 2021, Sobeys stated that in 2020 and 2021, "cage-free eggs (free run, free range, organic) made up 17.5% of our total shell egg sales", and that "our Own Brand lean ground pork, greater than 30% of the sows from our supplier are housed in loose housing systems".

== Online grocery sales ==
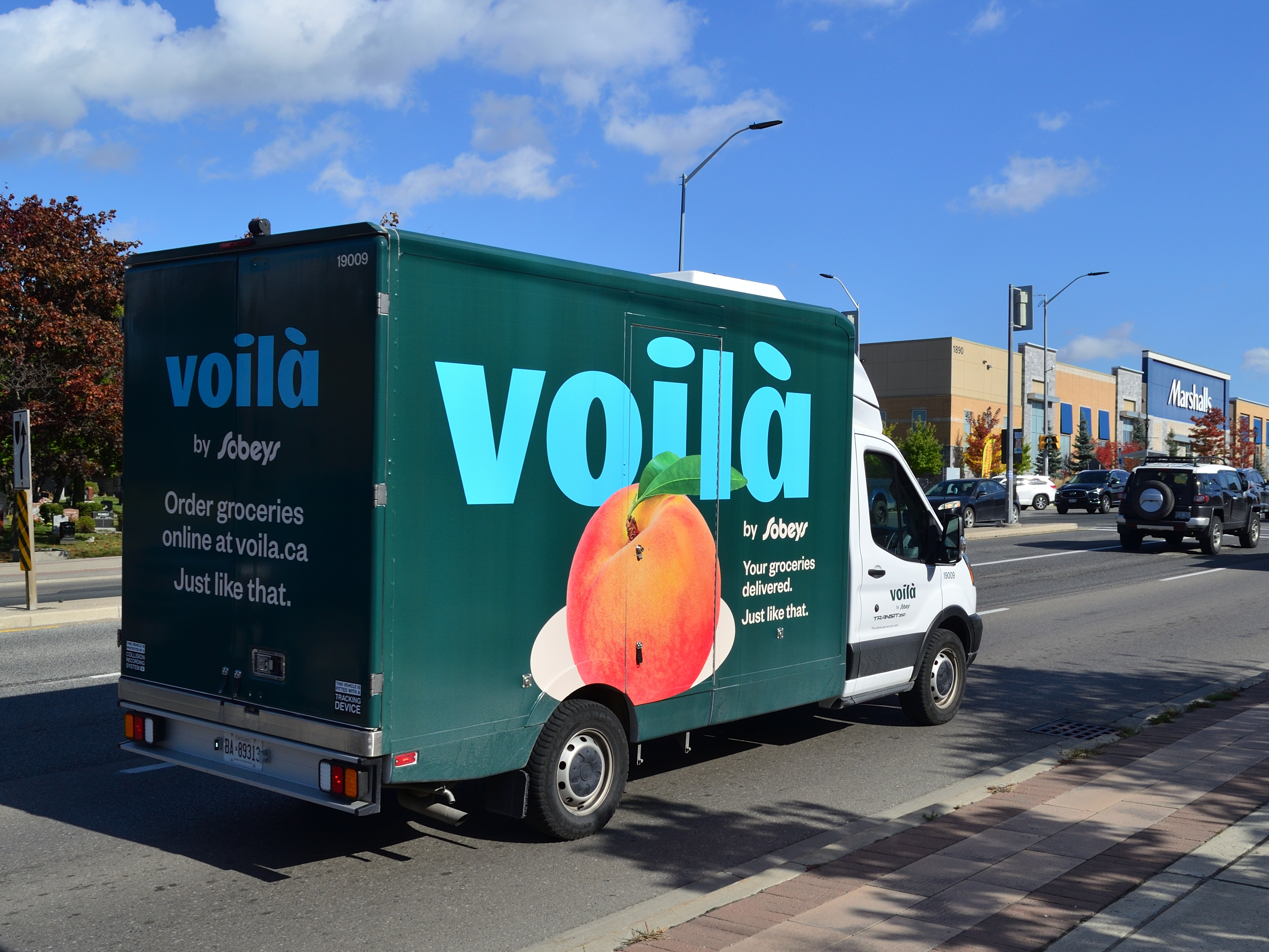
A Voilà online grocery delivery van

In January 2018, the company signed a deal with British company Ocado Group PLC to provide e-commerce solution for Sobeys using robots to assemble customer orders.

Michael Medline, CEO of Empire and Sobeys, said that the online grocery sales business would not be ready for approximately two years, and that he expected it to take another two years for the business to be profitable. A Bloomberg News reporter who viewed a video of a similar system described the process: "[The] similar Ocado facility in Andover, England, shows the facility spanning nearly 21,000 square metres (5¼ acres) with robots rolling over a grid to pick and pack customer orders in about five minutes." The publication Tech Insider, owned by Business Insider, posted a similar video to YouTube, stating: "Ocado's new warehouse has thousands of robots zooming around a grid system to pack groceries. [These] robots can process 65,000 orders every week. They communicate on a 4G network to avoid bumping into each other. Is this the future of retail?"

In addition to operating the automated warehouse, Ocado's technology provides instructions to delivery vans.

Voilà, an online grocery retailer operated by Sobeys launched in June 2020.

== Locations ==
Sobeys is based in Stellarton, Nova Scotia and has 27 distribution centres in Canada.

Its stores are located across Canada with 54 in Alberta, 1 in British Columbia, 17 in Manitoba, 23 in New Brunswick, 14 in Newfoundland and Labrador, 42 in Nova Scotia, 90 in Ontario, 5 in Prince Edward Island, and 10 in Saskatchewan.

== Empire Company ==
The Sobeys conglomerate is owned by Empire Company Limited, which is controlled by the Sobey family. The Empire Company also owns the trademarks to their former Empire Theatres cinema chain, which was until October 2013 Canada's second-largest movie theatre chain, when its locations were split between Cineplex Entertainment (Atlantic locations) and Landmark Cinemas (Ontario, British Columbia, and Alberta). Empire also owns many commercial properties through its subsidiary Crombie REIT.

== See also ==
- List of supermarket chains in Canada
