= Michael Medline =

Canadian businessman (born 1963)

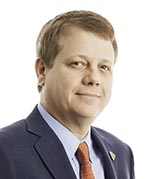
- Born: 4 July 1963 (age 63); Toronto, Ontario
- Education: University of Western Ontario (BA 1984); University of Toronto (LLB 1987); College of William and Mary (MBA 1991)
- Spouse: Kimberly Johnson (m. 1991)

Michael Bennett Medline (born 4 July 1963) is a Canadian businessman. From 2017 until 2025, he was the president and CEO of Empire Company Limited, a Canadian company whose core businesses includes food retailing, conducted through wholly owned Sobeys Inc., and related real estate. He was succeeded as CEO by Pierre St-Laurent.

Medline is also a former president and chief executive officer of Canadian Tire Corporation.

Medline has announced his plan to retire in May 2026.

== Early life and education ==
Medline was born in Toronto, and attended Huron University College at the University of Western Ontario in London, Ontario. Medline received an MBA from the Raymond A. Mason School of Business, College of William and Mary in Virginia and an LL.B. from the University of Toronto.

== Career ==
Medline began his career working with the Ontario Securities Commission, followed by a stint at law firm McCarthy Tétrault. He was corporate counsel for PepsiCo Canada before moving to Abitibi Consolidated Inc. where he held a variety of roles including as the senior vice president of strategy and corporate development. He then joined Canadian Tire Corporation in 2001 as EVP of new business development and went on to hold a series of successively senior retail leadership positions. Medline was named president of Canadian Tire in November 2013 and succeeded [1] Stephen Wetmore as CEO of Canadian Tire Corp. in December 2014. Previously, Medline was responsible for many of the company’s biggest acquisitions, including Mark's in February 2002, the Forzani Group in August 2011, and the acquisition of Pro Hockey Life in August 2013. On July 13, 2016, it was announced the board of directors voted to remove Medline, bringing back former CEO Stephen Wetmore.

In 2017, Medline was named the new president and CEO of Empire Company Limited and Sobeys Inc. He launched “Project Sunrise”, a three-year, $500-million cost-cutting initiative to revive the then-troubled grocer. It involved deep organizational restructuring, including cutting hundreds of corporate jobs, to streamline from many regional operations into one national organization.

Under his leadership, Empire made a series of strategic acquisitions including Ontario-based grocery retailer Farm Boy for $800 million (2018) and the purchase of a majority stake in Ontario-based specialty grocery retailer Longo’s and its Grocery Gateway e-commerce business for $357 million (2021). The company became a co-owner of the Scene+ loyalty program operated by Cineplex Inc. and Scotiabank in 2022, which replaced its previous Air Miles loyalty program partnership.

Medline currently serves on the board of trustees for the Hospital for Sick Children. He is a board member for Scotiabank, Huron University, The BlackNorth Initiative and The Sobey Foundation. He is the former Chair of the Retail Council of Canada and the Grocery Foundation and was a past member of the board of governors for Canada’s Sports Hall of Fame.

== Awards and honours ==
Medline was named as the Globe and Mail CEO of the Year in 2018, and Canada's Most Admired CEO for Transformational Leadership in 2020. In 2024, he received the Canadian Grand Prix Trailblazer Award of Distinction from the Retail Council of Canada.

== Animal welfare controversy ==
In 2016, Sobeys made a voluntary commitment to a 100% cage-free egg supply by the end of 2025. However, under Medline's leadership, Sobeys stated in 2021 that the company would not meet its original deadline. In 2025, the company faced criticism from farmed animal protection organizations, including Mercy For Animals, for not fulfilling its cage-free commitment.

As of August 2025, Sobeys has yet to share an updated, time-bound plan for implementing its cage-free policy. Medline has faced criticism for not addressing public concerns about when and how Sobeys would fulfill its cage-free pledge during his tenure as CEO. The criticism coincides with the April 2025 announcement that Medline will retire in May 2026.
