= Empire Theatres =

Defunct Canadian movie theater chain

Empire Theatres Limited
- Type: Private (subsidiary of Empire Company Ltd.)
- Industry: Movie theatres
- Predecessors: AMC Theatres (2 Canadian locations); Famous Players
- Founded: December 15, 1978
- Defunct: October 31, 2013
- Fate: 24 sold to Cineplex in Atlantic Canada. (23 in operation as of 2017); 23 sold to Landmark Cinemas in Ontario and Western Canada; 1 owned by Imagine Cinemas in Ontario; 1 owned by independent owners in British Columbia; 1 drive-in closed; 2 others remain closed
- Successors: Cineplex Entertainment; Landmark Cinemas; Imagine Cinemas
- Headquarters: Stellarton, Nova Scotia
- Area served: Canada
- Key people: Stuart G. Fraser, president and CEO; Valerie J. Ryan, COO; Paul Wigginton, vice-president and CFO
- Number of employees: approx. 3000

Empire Theatres Limited was a movie theatre chain in Canada, a subsidiary of Empire Company Ltd., the holding company of the Sobey family conglomerate.

In June 2013, Empire announced it would exit the movie theatre business, selling the vast majority of locations to Cineplex (24 in Atlantic Canada) and Landmark Cinemas (23, in Ontario and western Canada, including two locations originally slated to be purchased by Cineplex and the Downtown Ottawa theatre). Five other locations in operation at the time of the announcement were not included in either deal and were closed, Two of the locations re-opened again at a later date under different owners and two other locations and one drive-in remain closed.

== History ==
=== Formation ===
Empire Theatres was formed from the Sobey family's purchase of the Atlantic Canadian assets of Canadian Odeon Theatres in 1984 as part of that chain's merger into Cineplex Odeon Corporation (now Cineplex Entertainment). Later, it also acquired selected Famous Players theatres locations, including those in Newfoundland and Labrador.

Throughout the 1980s and 1990s, Famous Players remained a major competitor in the Maritimes. Empire responded by opening several new or replacement locations along the lines of the multiplexes being opened by Cineplex and Famous Players in the rest of Canada.

Despite an aggressive expansion in the Maritimes in the mid-1990s, Famous Players had focused on improvements elsewhere and did not match Empire's moves, one of which included an 18-screen (including one IMAX screen) multiplex in the Bayers Lake Business Park in suburban Halifax. With comparably minor interests in the region, Famous Players cut back on marketing and then sold its remaining screens in Atlantic Canada to Empire Theatres in 2004.

=== Expansion to Western Canada ===
On August 22, 2005, Empire announced it would acquire 27 theatres, with a total of 202 screens, in locations from British Columbia to Ontario, from Cineplex Galaxy LP, as a result of the latter's acquisition of Famous Players Theatres, effectively doubling Empire's size. Most of the locations were "traditional" venues, but some were larger theatres, such as Coliseum Calgary, SilverCity theatres in Kitchener and St. Catharines, Ontario, one in Calgary, Alberta, and Cineplex Odeon Square One in Mississauga. The deal closed September 30, 2005.

In December 2009, the Empire Theatres chain had 48 screens equipped with digital projection and RealD 3D capabilities. In March 2012, Empire announced that it was the "first national exhibitor in Canada to complete circuit wide digital cinema conversion", with 359 screens converted, 40 percent of which had RealD 3D capability.

On June 21, 2012, Empire announced the acquisition of two Ontario-based theatres from AMC Theatres, located in Ottawa, Ontario and Whitby, Ontario. Each theatre featured 24 screens, including an IMAX experience auditorium. Empire had also announced plans to equip all screens in these locations with Barco digital technology, and some with RealD 3D technology, to "provide movie-goers with a state-of-the-art movie presentation experience".

=== Sale to Cineplex and Landmark ===
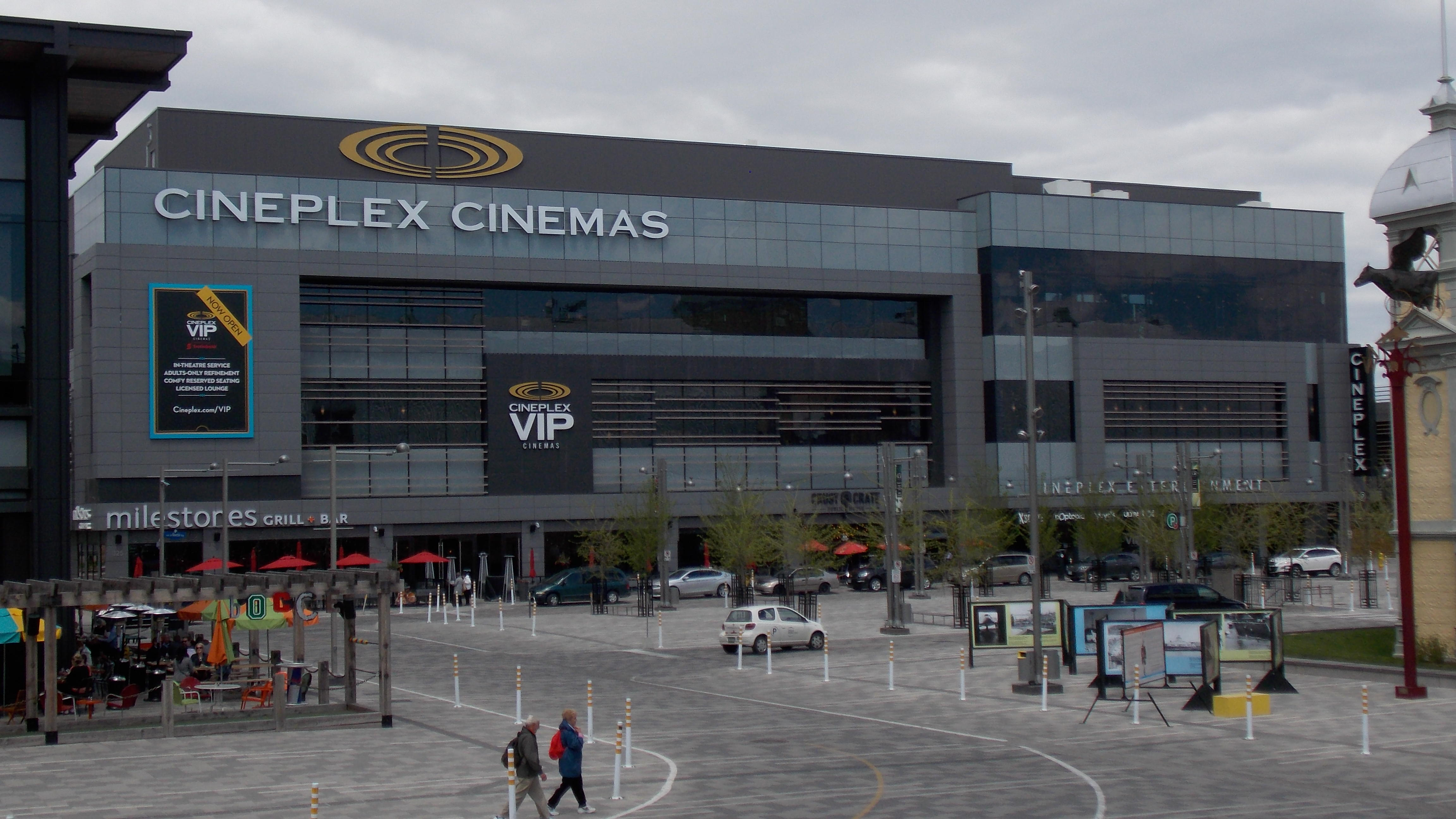
The Lansdowne location that Empire Theatres announced in 2011 was acquired by Cineplex in 2014 and opened in 2015.

On June 27, 2013, Empire Company Ltd. announced that it would be focusing on its retail and real estate operations (including Sobeys, which earlier in the month had agreed to purchase Safeway's Canadian operations). To that end, Empire Theatres wound down its operations and sold or closed all of its theatres.

Cineplex Entertainment purchased 24 theatres for approximately C$194 million on October 10, 2013. It consisted of all Empire locations in Atlantic Canada. On October 22, 2013, Empire Theatres closed its Atlantic Canada locations after the evening shows. The Atlantic Canada theatres sale to Cineplex was completed on October 24, 2013. On October 24 or 25, 2013, the theatres reopened as Cineplex Cinemas. The deal was to include the two former AMC locations in Ottawa and Whitby, but they were later removed from the deal because of the Competition Bureau's concerns. In lieu of the Kanata location, Cineplex later acquired the rights to Empire's planned 10-screen Lansdowne Park location in Ottawa.

Landmark Cinemas purchased another 23 theatres in Ontario and Western Canada for Can$55 million. This was a minority equity share and management control of the theatres, which was later financed by TriWest Capital Partners. The sale was completed on November 1, 2013.

Empire's 2013 sale to Cineplex would not be the last significant connection between the two companies. Several years later, in 2022, Empire Company joined Cineplex and Scotiabank as a partner in the Scene+ loyalty program.

== Locations ==
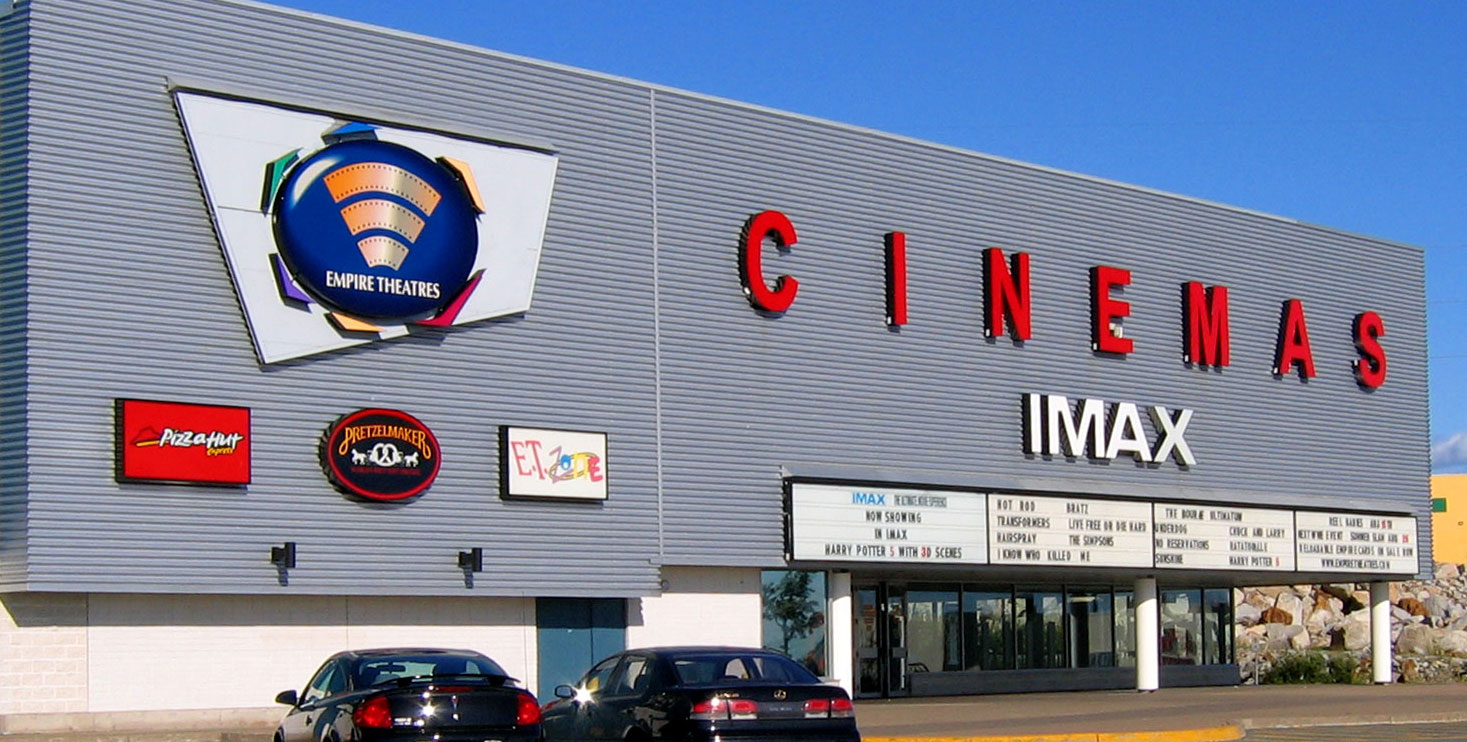
Empire Theatres in Bayers Lake Business Park in Halifax, Nova Scotia, now operated by Cineplex.

Empire Theatres operated 50 locations and planned to build four more at the time of closure. Of these, 24 were sold to Cineplex Entertainment along with the rights to two of the planned locations, while another 20 locations were sold to Landmark Cinemas. Most of the locations sold to Landmark were formerly Famous Players locations.

Five locations were not included in the sales:

- Highland Drive-In (Westville, Nova Scotia): closed by Empire on September 2, 2013. Cineplex instead chose to focus on opening a theatre at the IWK Health Centre in Halifax, a first for the company, in July 2017. On May 20, 2020, it was announced that the drive-in is slated to be reopened under the name “Highland Drive-in,” with a prospective opening date of June 2020.
- Elgin Mills 10 closed on August 15, 2013, but it was acquired by Rainbow Cinemas in October 2013. It re-opened on November 20, 2013. It was later sold to Imagine Cinemas in 2016.
- World Exchange Plaza in Ottawa: lease expired in 2013. The landlord decided to renovate and on January 24, 2017, it was announced that Klipfolio dashboard would open corporate offices to replace the theatre.
- Westmount Centre in Edmonton: closed in spring 2011, and has since been left vacant.
- Capitol 6 Theatre in Victoria, British Columbia: closed on October 17, 2013. This Theatre re-opened on November 4, 2016 under the same name. It is run by independent owners and has since been renovated.

In addition to existing locations, Empire had announced plans to construct four additional locations:

- St. John's, Newfoundland and Labrador: Plans for this location with an Empire Screen were initially divested to Cineplex, which later abandoned the project. As of June 2020, the site features corporate offices for ExxonMobil in lieu of the movie theatre.
- Markham, Ontario: announced in 2008, but abandoned upon Empire closing. On April 2, 2015, Cineplex Cinemas Markham and VIP opened, but it is located in downtown Markham, not near Major Mackenzie Drive East as planned by Empire.
- Ottawa, Ontario (Lansdowne Park): It opened as Cineplex Cinemas Lansdowne and VIP on March 27, 2015. This location was first announced by Empire Theatres on May 26, 2011 as a 10-screen, three-storey location. On June 27, 2013, Empire announced that it remained committed to the project. On February 24, 2014, Cineplex secured the rights to this theatre. The ten screens include two 2D screens, three 3D screens, four VIP screens (a first for any Cineplex theatre in Ottawa) with optional 3D and one UltraAVX screen with Dolby Atmos and optional D-BOX and 3D.
- Edmonton, Alberta: It opened as Cineplex Cinemas Manning Town Centre on April 11, 2014. This location was first announced by Empire Theatres on June 12, 2012 as a 10-screen location, with one screen featuring digital IMAX technology. Cineplex later acquired the rights to this building project on February 6, 2014, but opted to build an UltraAVX auditorium in lieu of IMAX. The cinema retains the same design as some of the final Empire locations to be built and open to the public.

== Refreshments ==
Many Empire venues supplied New York Fries, Pretzelmaker, TCBY, and Pizza Pizza or Pizza 73 (such as Empire Theatres Pen Centre, Empire Theatres Guildford and Empire Theatres Bayer's Lake and IMAX Theatre in Bayer's Lake - Suburban Halifax, Nova Scotia). Along with these food venues, Empire Theatres also had their own traditional food venue in every theatre with food items such as popcorn and nachos.
