= Scanner Price Accuracy Code =

Canadian retail voluntary practice

The Scanner Price Accuracy Code is a Canadian retail voluntary practice managed by the Retail Council of Canada and endorsed by the Competition Bureau. It was introduced in June 2002 as Canadian retailers were in the midst of updating their point-of-sale systems with barcode readers to "foster consumer confidence" with the new systems. It provides consumers with compensation for items with an incorrectly scanned price.

It was developed by the Retail Council of Canada in collaboration with the Canadian Association of Chain Drug Stores (now Neighbourhood Pharmacy Association of Canada), the Canadian Federation of Independent Grocers and the Canadian Council of Grocery Distributors.

== Code ==
The code applies only to retail shops that participate in the voluntary program. One of its key features is the "Item Free Scanner Policy". If the price of an item scans incorrectly during checkout at the point of sale, the customer is entitled to request a price adjustment; if the item's price is less than $10, they receive it for free, and if the item's price is at least $10, the customer receives a $10 discount. If the customer purchases more than one of that item, the first one is subject to the price adjustment, and the others are charged at the posted sale price. The sale price may include that posted in the shop, in an advertising flyer, or in online advertisements.

Items covered by the code include those that have a Universal Product Code (UPC), a Price look-up code (PLU), or other barcodes that are scanned at the point of sale by a barcode reader. The code does not apply to items that are individually priced (that is, they have a price tag), items that are weighed (such as produce), prescription drugs, and cosmetics available only "behind-the-counter".

=== Problem resolution ===
A customer unsatisfied with the cashier's point-of-sale resolution for a price discrepancy should first attempt to resolve it with the shop's manager or supervisor. If this does not result in a resolution, the consumer may call the Retail Council of Canada Scanner Price Accuracy Committee at a toll-free telephone number to register a complaint. About 92% of the 1000 annual calls received by the committee are not legitimate complaints.

Incorrect charges for individually priced items are covered by the Competition Act, and unresolved price discrepancies reported to the Competition Bureau.

== Participation ==
There are few participating retail chains, but they represent over 7,000 shops throughout Canada, excluding those in Quebec which are covered by the provincial Consumer Protection Act with a similar compulsory policy. Among them are Best Buy, Canadian Tire, Costco, Giant Tiger, Home Depot, Lawtons, Loblaw Companies, Rona, Safeway, Shoppers Drug Mart, Sobeys, Toys "R" Us, and Walmart.

Shops of participating merchants are required to post a sign about the code near the entrance to the shop, and some also post a notice or sticker at the point of sale.
