= Big 8 Beverages =

Canadian soft drinks company

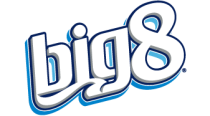
- Type: Soft drinks
- Distributor: Sobeys
- Origin: Nova Scotia, Canada
- Introduced: 1930; 96 years ago
- Website: big8beverages.ca

Big 8 Beverages is a Canadian soft drinks company based in the town of Stellarton, Nova Scotia. Established in 1930 and owned by the Sobeys chain of supermarkets since 1986, the company produces fizzy soda drinks of a wide range of flavours; they also bottle both spring and distilled water.

== History ==
The Big 8 brand name was created in the 1930s by Fenton and Day Beverages, and is now owned by Sobeys. it was Ireated in the 1930s by Fred Day and his brother-in-law George Fenton. They named their cola Big 8 after the eight-cent price for a bottle roughly a litre in size. Coca-Cola wanted to purchase Fenton and Day in 1946; however, they would not pay what the owners thought the company was worth. Three months later, 7-Up Maritimes offered the right price; founders Fenton and Day sold their company and retired. The Big 8 name stayed idle until Maritime Beverages, the 7-Up distributor for the Maritime provinces, gave the label and trademark to Sobeys free of charge in 1986.

== Operations ==
Big 8 Beverages entered the water business in 1999 with the construction of a bottling facility in Stellarton. The well owned by Big 8, where they extract their water, is located at 912 Salmon River Road in the community of Salmon River. The company has been approved to withdraw water from the well since 2002, with their approval allowing for the extraction of up to 650,000 litres of water per day until 2030. The province of Nova Scotia charges Big 8 an annual cost of CA$360.27 for the water they extract. Concerns have been raised over the environmental and economic impacts of Big 8's high levels of water extraction for a low cost.

== Products ==
Big 8 Beverages sells 40 different products as of 2025, with 23 sodas and a variety of bottled water products. The design of Big 8's products was updated in 2025 with a similar colour scheme to Pepsi products, featuring a lighthouse and waves.
