= Co-op Atlantic =

Canadian consumers' cooperative

- Type: Consumers' cooperative
- Founded: 1927
- Headquarters: Moncton, New Brunswick, Canada
- Website: http://coopatlantic.ca/

Co-op Atlantic is a Canadian collectively owned consumers' cooperative. The cooperative is legally owned by its members and controlled by a board of directors. The head offices of Co-op Atlantic are located in Moncton, New Brunswick.

== History ==
The company was founded in 1927 in Moncton as a small Agricultural supply agricultural co-operative whose main idea was to provide a means for local farmers to promote their livestock. Today the group has 128 member co-operative enterprises across Atlantic Canada and Quebec.

In 2015, Co-op Atlantic sold its grocery distribution operations to Sobeys. As part of the sale, Sobeys became the wholesale supplier for its member-owned grocery stores, while five Co-op grocery stores were sold to Sobeys and converted to Foodland, and five gas stations were sold to Sobeys and rebranded as either Shell or FastFuel.

== Main enterprises ==
The following is a list of the main enterprises.

Name	Type of Co-op
Co-op stores	Supermarket
Co-op Feed/Country Stores	Agricultural supply
Co-op Fuels	Heating and Fuel Oils
The Medicine Shoppe	Pharmacy
Avide	Design-build
RiteSTOP	Convenience store
Maximum Security	Home and commercial security

== See also ==
- List of Canadian supermarkets
