= Needs Convenience =

Canadian convenience store chain

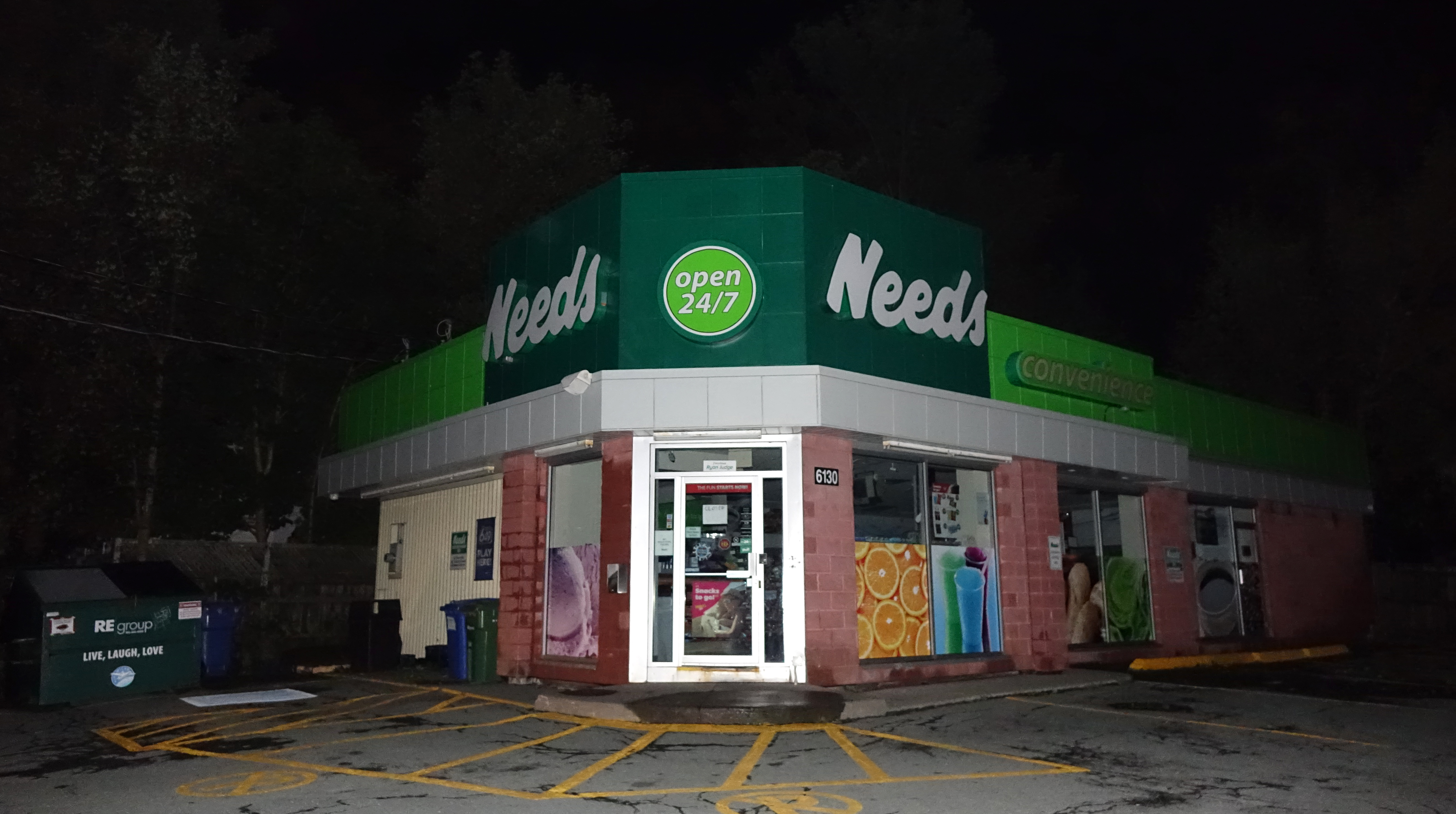
- A Needs franchise in Halifax, Nova Scotia
- Company type: Franchise
- Industry: Convenience stores
- Number of locations: 140+ (2017)
- Area served: Atlantic Canada
- Parent: Sobeys Inc.
- Website: needs.ca

Needs Convenience, or simply Needs, is a chain of convenience stores throughout Atlantic Canada.

The Needs logo and trademark are owned by Sobeys. Individual stores are operated by independent franchisees. Sobeys is the exclusive supplier to the chain.

Many stores operate from 6am-midnight; however, there are some 24-hour locations in larger urban centres. The Needs chain has installed gasoline stations at some locations using either the Ultramar Limited, Shell or Sobeys Fast Fuels brands.

== History ==
The Needs Convenience chain developed from a series of small acquisitions by Sobeys, beginning with the TRA wholesale business in Middleton, Nova Scotia. By the mid-1990s, Needs stores were appearing throughout Atlantic Canada. The Sobeys-owned Green Gables chain was changed over to Needs by the late 1990s as part of a final effort to consolidate the region's up-scale convenience store market.

During the early 2000s, Sobeys experimented with converting several Needs stores to the Sobeys Express brand on a limited trial basis. The trial was unsuccessful and the stores reverted to the Needs brand; however, several stores are now being branded as Needs Convenience Extra or Needs Convenience Plus.

== See also ==
- Foodland and FreshCo for other Sobeys-owned grocery stores.
