= Lawtons =

Canadian drug store chain owned by Empire Company Limited

- Type: Subsidiary
- Industry: Drug stores
- Founded: Bell Island, Dominion of Newfoundland
- Headquarters: Dartmouth, Nova Scotia, Canada
- Parent: Sobeys
- Website: lawtons.ca

Lawtons, also known as Lawtons Drugs, is a Canadian drug store chain owned by the Sobeys Group of Stellarton, Nova Scotia; its head office is located in Dartmouth, Nova Scotia.

It is a participant in the voluntary Scanner Price Accuracy Code managed by the Retail Council of Canada.

== Operations ==
The company has over 67 locations operating throughout Atlantic Canada, in the provinces of New Brunswick, Newfoundland and Labrador, Nova Scotia and Prince Edward Island. In many Atlantic Canada communities, the company is the only drug store. In others, it competes with Shoppers Drug Mart or I.D.A. pharmacies. Its parent company Sobeys has no plans to expand outside Atlantic Canada.

The word "Drugs" was dropped from the name when a new logo was introduced in 2004.
