= Thrifty Foods =

Canadian supermarket chain owned by Empire Company Limited

- Type: Subsidiary
- Industry: Retail (Grocery)
- Founded: Fairfield, Victoria, BC (1977)
- Headquarters: Langford, British Columbia
- Key people: Alex Campbell (Founder) Michael Medline (President & CEO of Empire Company)
- Products: Grocery
- Owner: Empire Company
- Number of employees: approx. 5,000
- Parent: Sobeys (2007–present)
- Website: www.thriftyfoods.com

Thrifty Foods (often shortened to Thrifty's) is a chain of supermarkets located in British Columbia, Canada.

== Background ==
Thrifty Foods was founded by Alex Campbell and Ernie Skinner in 1977 when the first store was opened in Victoria's Fairfield neighbourhood. As of June 2018, the chain operates 25 stores, with 2 more under construction on Vancouver Island and the Lower Mainland. It is the largest supermarket chain on Vancouver Island. In 2007 it became a division of Sobeys which operated independently of the larger company initially, before being fully integrated.

Since 2004, it has operated an on-line grocery service on Vancouver Island. The online ordering system extends into the Metro Vancouver area.

The company has an annual scholarship program that gives out $1500 to 20 students that are part of the company's web, either directly or indirectly.

Thrifty Foods is the largest private employer on Vancouver Island. In 1999, Thrifty Foods was voted among the Ten Best Companies to Work For in British Columbia.

In 2007, Thrifty Foods was recognized as one Canada's 50 Best Managed Companies.
