= Retail Council of Canada =

Canadian trade association

- Conseil canadien du commerce de détail
- Abbreviation: RCC
- Established: 1963; 63 years ago
- Type: Not-for-profit
- Purpose: Trade association
- Headquarters: 800–1881 Yonge Street; Toronto, Ontario M4S 3C4
- Region served: Canada
- President & CEO: Kim Furlong
- Website: www.retailcouncil.org

The Retail Council of Canada (French: Conseil canadien du commerce de détail), founded in 1963, is a not-for-profit trade association representing retail companies in Canada. RCC coordinates advocacy, communications and education campaigns on behalf of its member companies.

It manages the voluntary retail Scanner Price Accuracy Code.
