= IGA, Inc. =

American multinational supermarket chain franchise

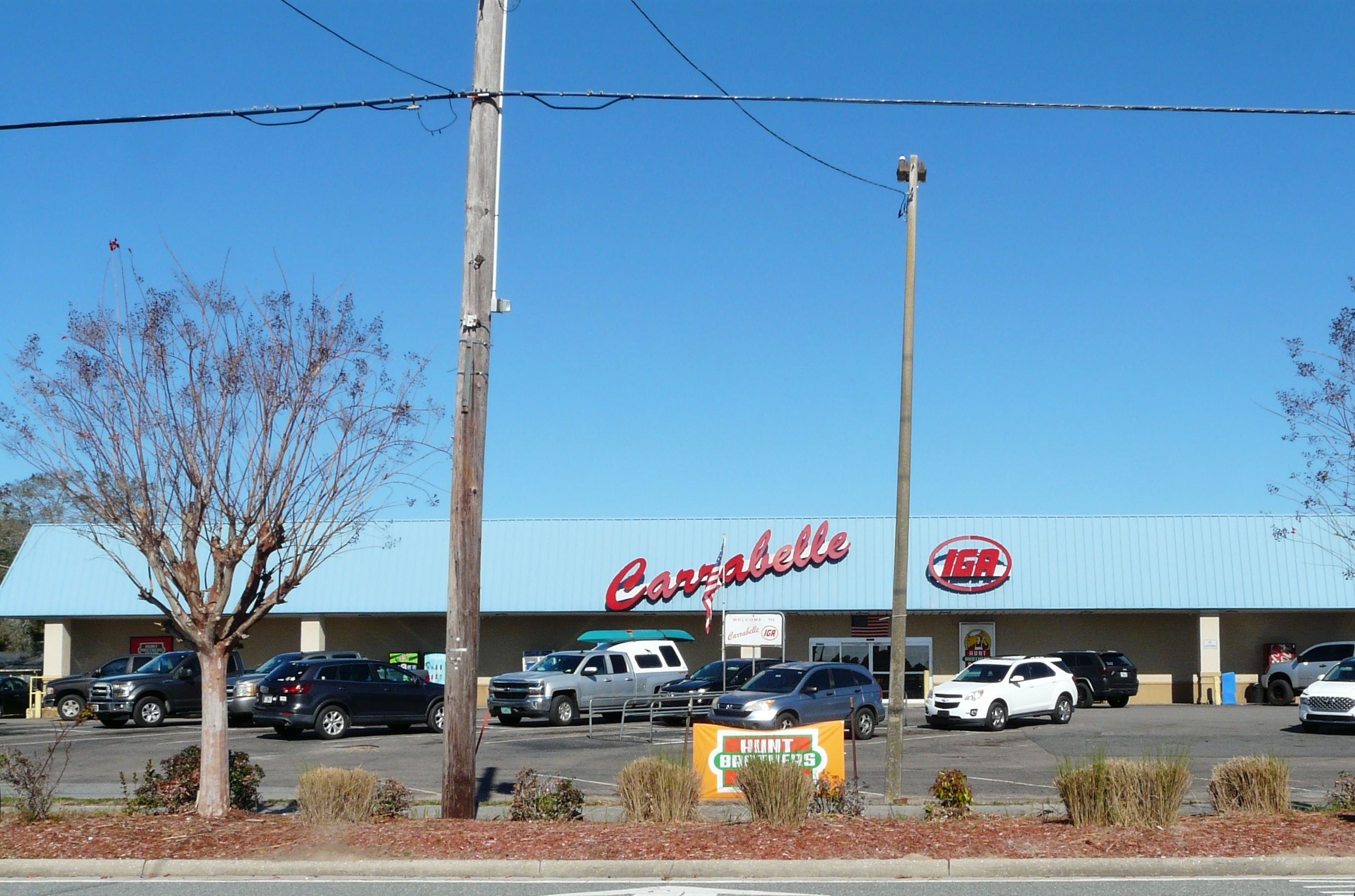
- IGA in Carrabelle, Florida
- Trade name: IGA
- Industry: Retail
- Founded: May 1926; 100 years ago
- Founders: J. Frank Grimes
- Headquarters: Chicago, Illinois, U.S.
- Area served: 30 countries

IGA, INC. is an international affiliation of franchised grocery stores that are independently owned and operated. As of 2026, the network included nearly 7,500 supermarkets in more than 30 countries, representing $80 billion in annual sales — with many IGA stores operating in small-town markets and owned by their managing families.

Headquartered in Chicago, Illinois, IGA was founded in 1926 the United States as the Independent Grocers Alliance.

== History ==
IGA was founded in May 1926 when a group of 100 independent retailers in Poughkeepsie, New York, and Sharon, Connecticut, led by J. Frank Grimes, organized into a single marketing system, primarily to help independent grocers compete against the emerging national grocery chain, the now defunct A&P. IGA management provided marketing guidance and consistent supply chain access to its IGA stores, many located in smaller cities and towns across the U.S., using the "Hometown Proud Supermarkets" slogan.

By the end of its first year, the group had expanded to include more than 150 retailers, and shortly after its founding, the company began making and marketing its own canned food brand. By 1930, over 8,000 grocery stores were using the IGA name. As of 2024, IGA operated with over 6200 different locations worldwide.

William Olsen was the company CEO until 1988, replaced by Thomas Haggai, who retired in 2016. Mark Batenic replaced Haggai, John Ross — a former lot boy, store manager, president of data analytics firm Inmar Intelligence and author of Fire in the Zoo — became IGA's new president and CEO. In 2024 IGA purchased Scanner Applications, owned by Inmar, to streamline in-store promotions.

The stores in the alliance remain independently owned and operated. The alliance oversees several resources shared among the member stores, including, most visibly, the IGA store brand products and their logistical distribution network. The alliance also provides training and assessment programs and an online advertising platform. It regularly coordinates promotional events and charity fundraising events that benefit store communities.

As of 2023, IGA was located in 22 countries. There were 763 locations in 38 states and territories in the US. The states with the highest concentration are North Carolina, South Carolina, and Kentucky.

== Australia ==
The IGA brand in Australia is owned by Metcash, an Australian conglomerate retailer and wholesaler. The company supplies groceries, promotional materials, and other things to a large number of locally owned Australian supermarkets and a few other brands like Foodland and Friendly Grocer. Collectively, it is the fourth-biggest competitor in major Australian supermarkets, after Coles, Woolworths and Aldi. There are 1,400 independently owned IGA stores throughout Australia, with most running their own IGA Community Chest, which raises funds to support local communities and charities.

== Canada ==
Logo used in Quebec and New Brunswick since January 1990. Before that, the international IGA logo was used.

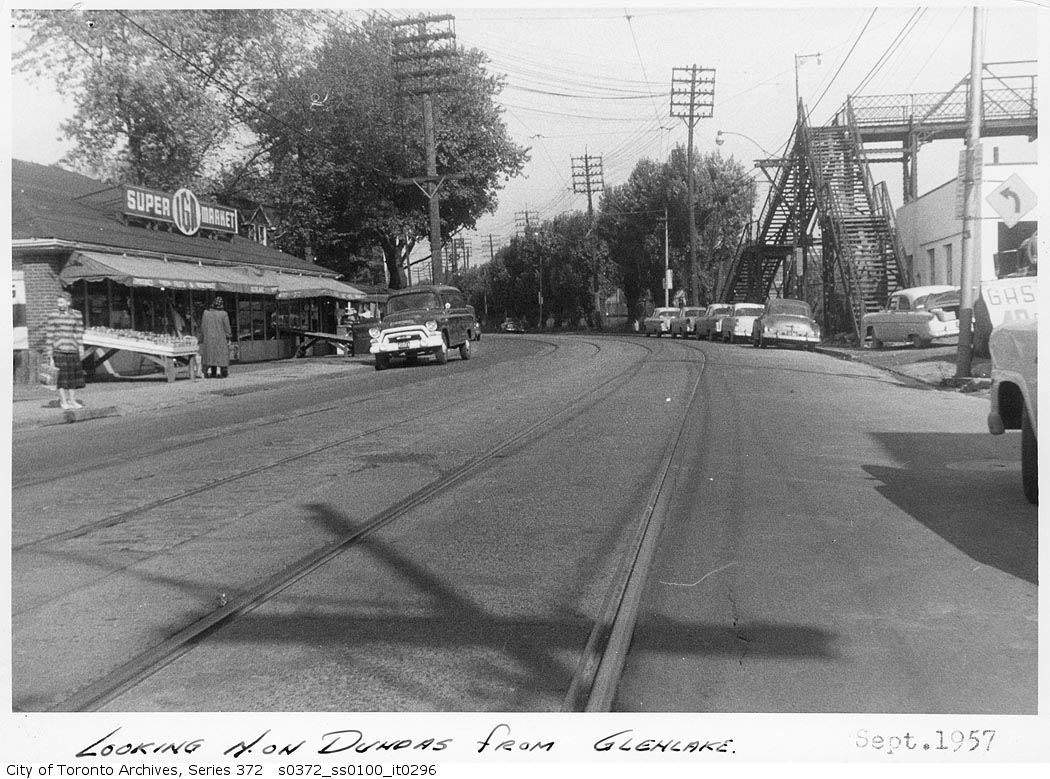
IGA store (left) on Dundas Street in Toronto, September 1957.

In Canada (apart from British Columbia), IGA is a group of independent grocers supplied by Sobeys, which franchises the name. Acquired by Sobeys as part of its purchase of the Oshawa Group Ltd., it now operates primarily in Quebec.

IGA stores in British Columbia, excepting a few in the eastern part of the province, are independently owned and are operated by Georgia Main Food Group.

== Dominica ==
HHV. Whitchurch is the only company in Dominica that follows the IGA. It has one location in Dominica, in Roseau.

== Philippines ==
Walter Mart Supermarket is the first and only alliance member in the Philippines. The store has 47 locations in the country, mostly in Metro Manila and Luzon - from Gapan, Nueva Ecija in the north to Tanauan, Batangas, in the south.

== Gallery ==
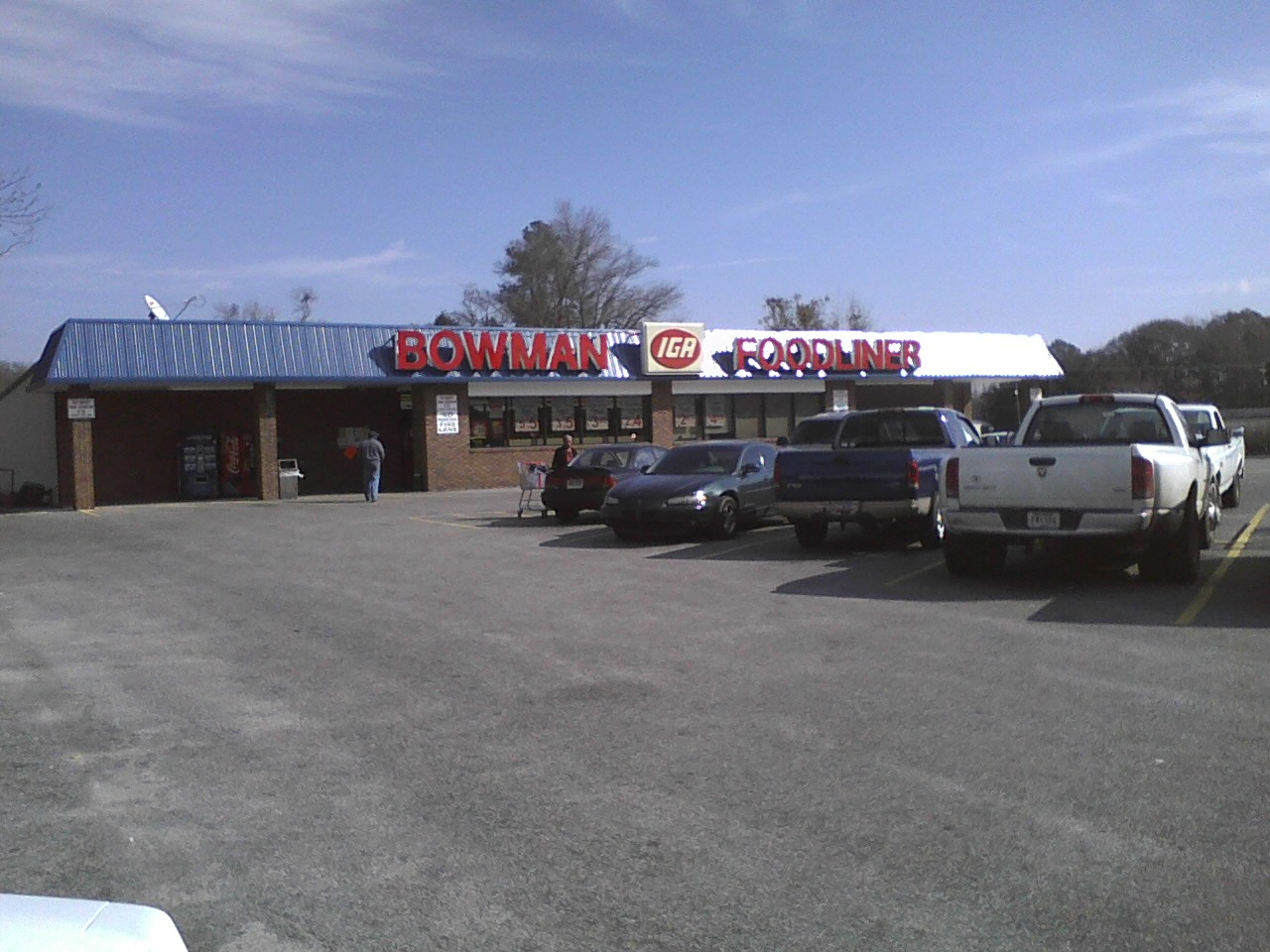
Bowman IGA Foodliner in Bowman, South Carolina, in December 2008. This location closed after it caught fire on September 24, 2017; there are no plans to reopen it.

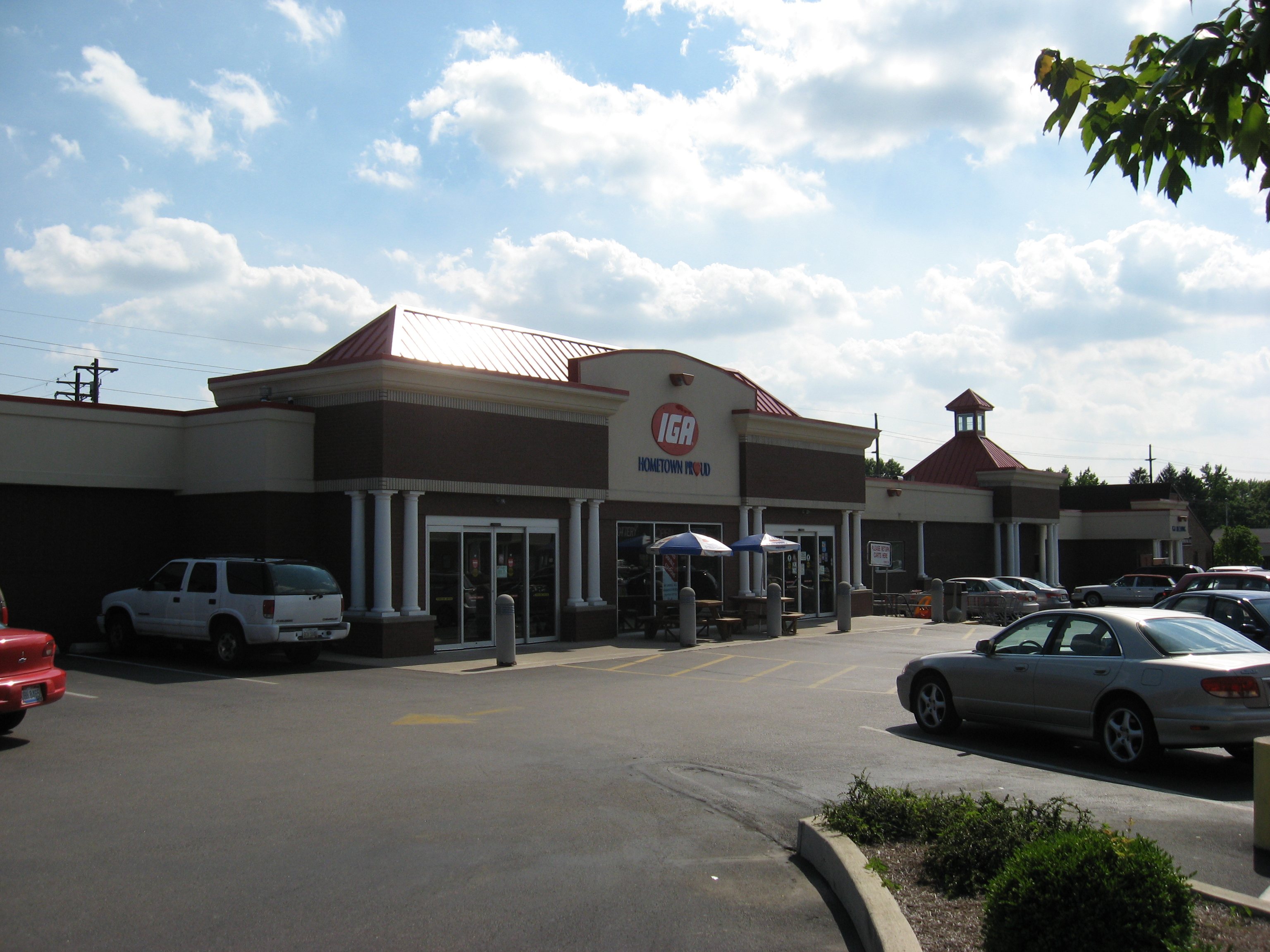
New IGA storefront in Springboro, Ohio, in June 2009. This location closed in 2014 and was demolished in 2016.

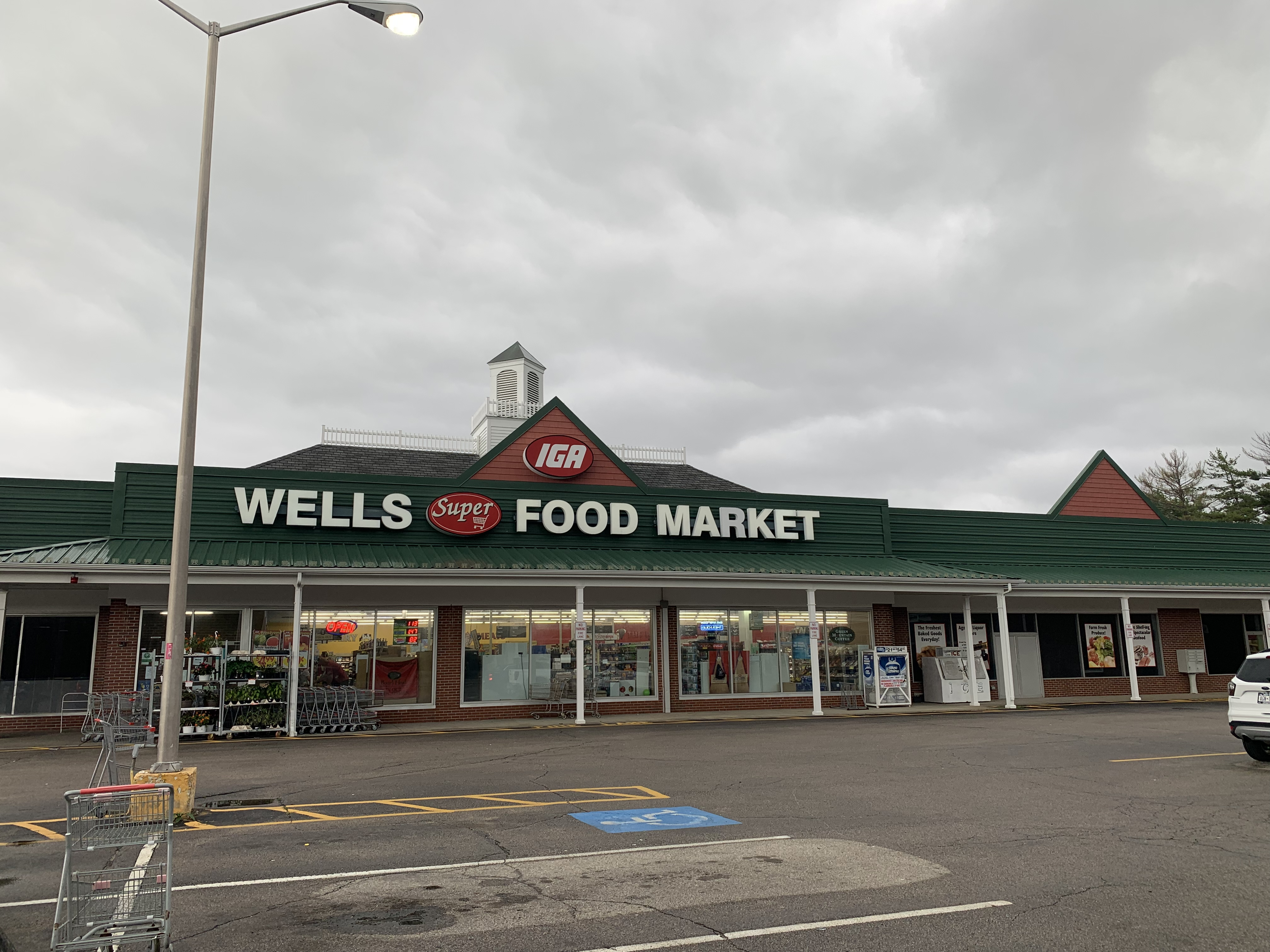
Wells IGA Food Market in Wells, Maine, in July 2021

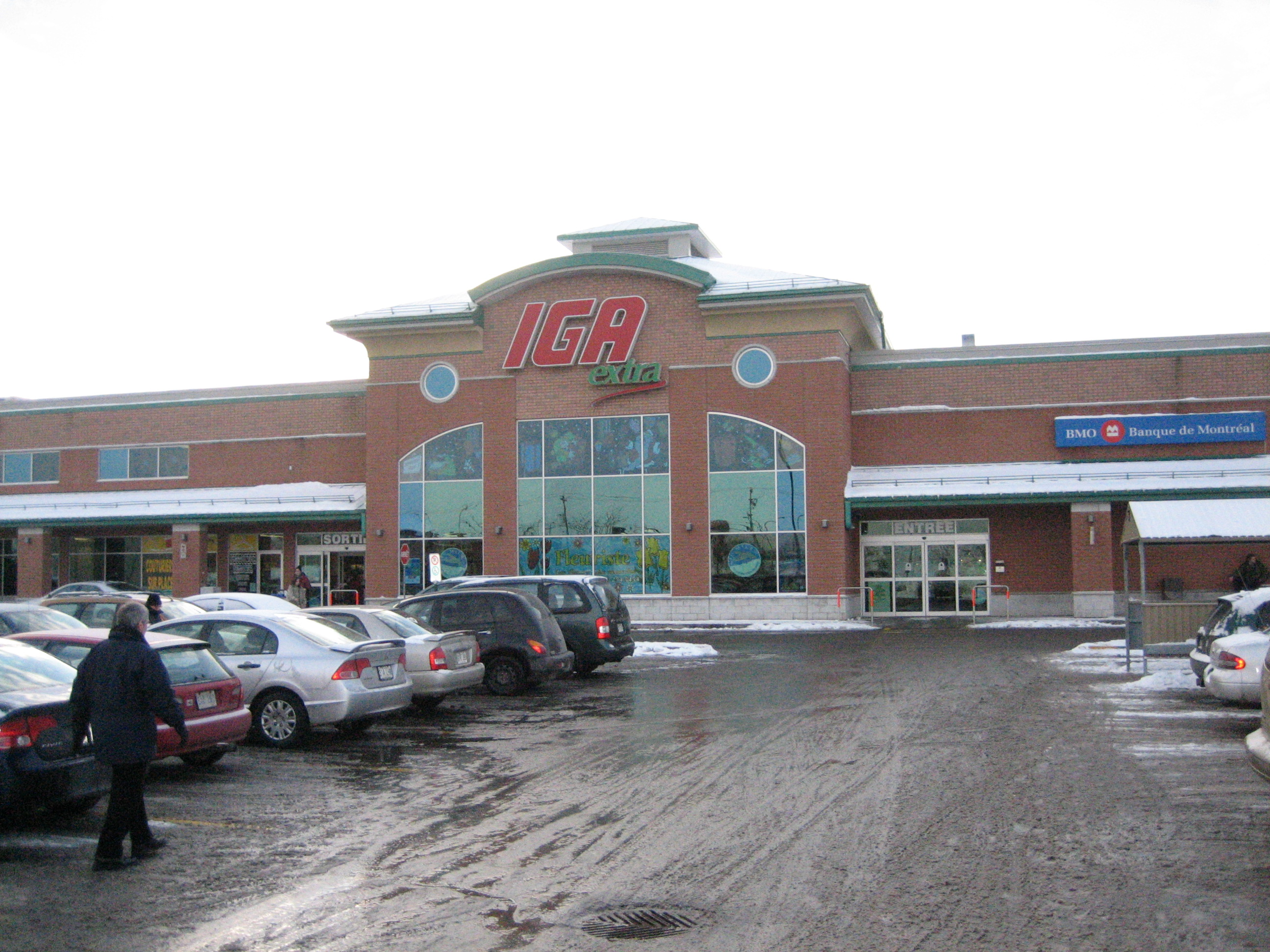
IGA Extra Langelier in Montreal, Quebec, in December 2006.

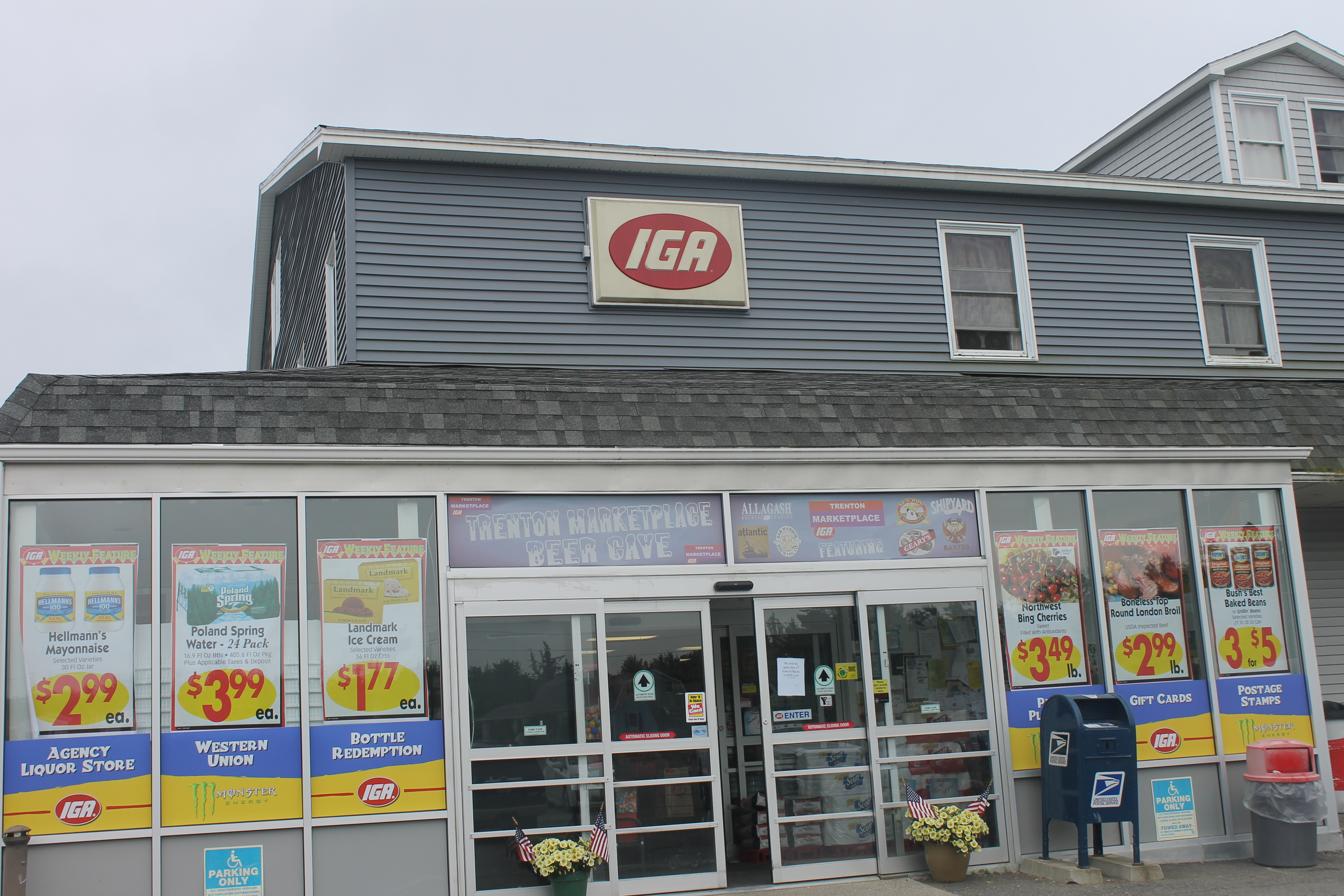
Trenton Marketplace IGA in Trenton, Maine, in Hancock County in June 2014. In July 2020, the store was sold and affiliation changed to Shop & Save/Hannaford.

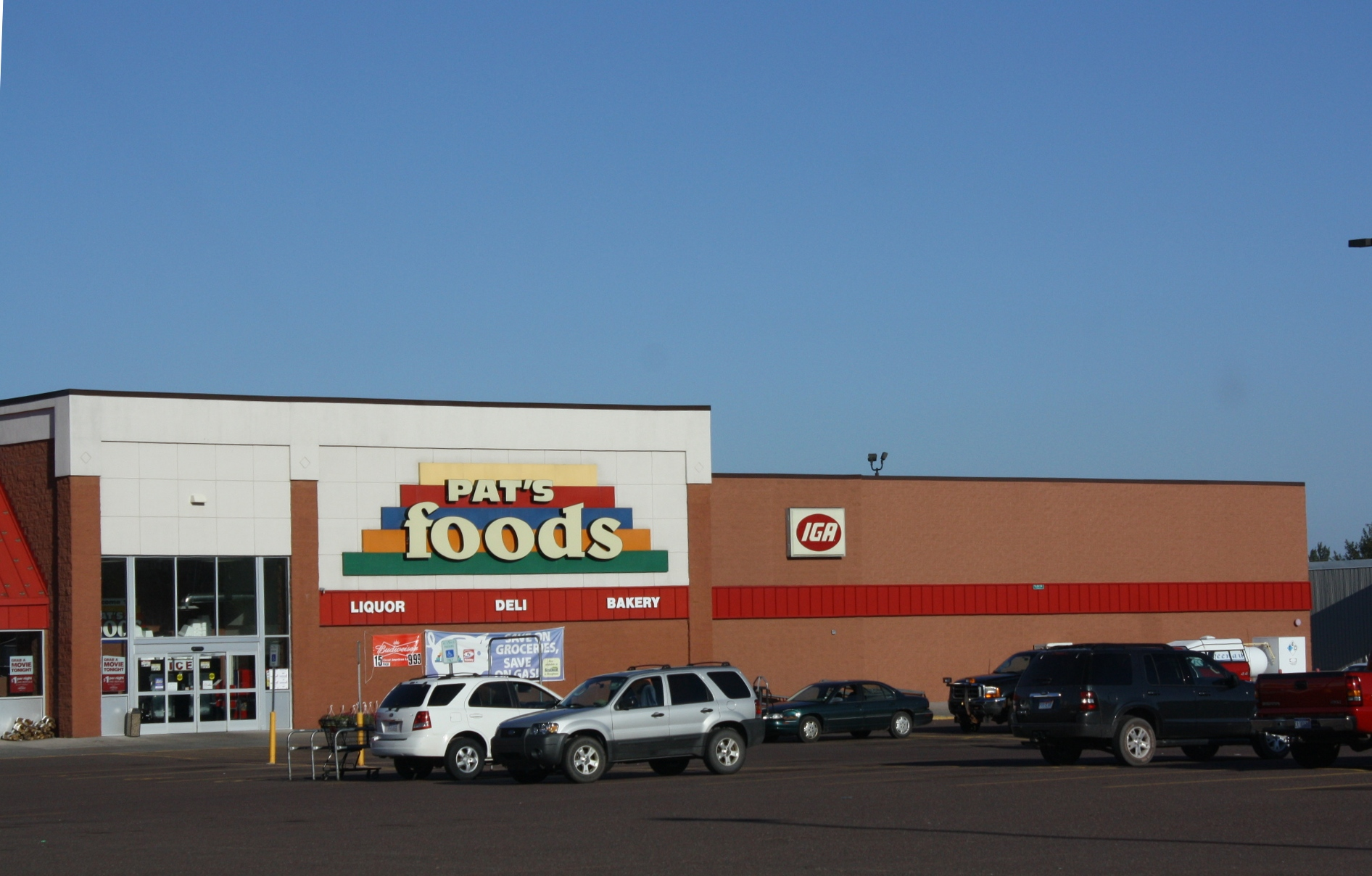
Pat's Foods IGA in Calumet, Michigan, in August 2010.

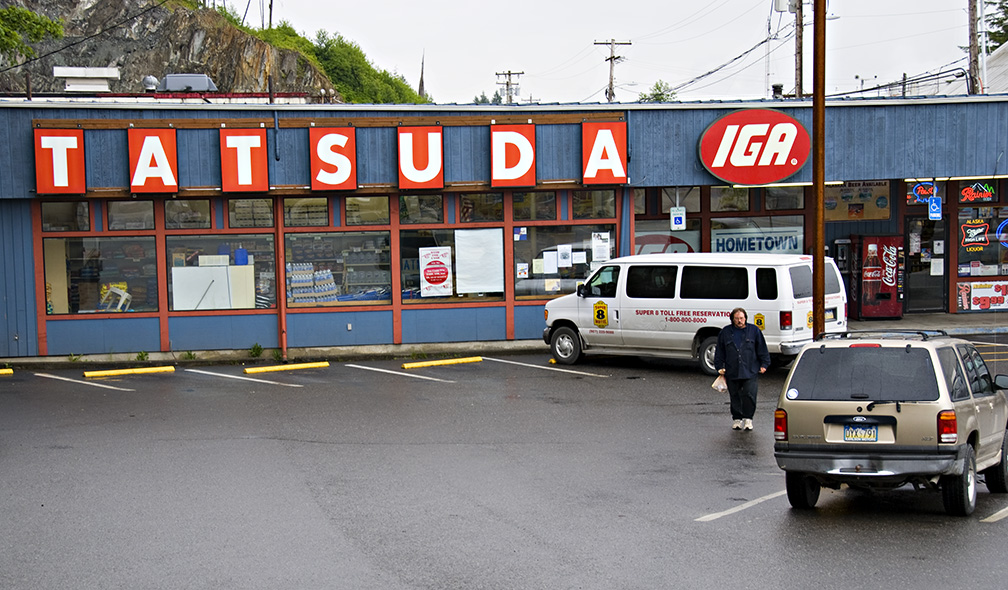
Tatsuda's IGA in Ketchikan, Alaska, in June 2007. Established in 1916, the business predates the establishment of the IGA brand seen on its storefront. This location closed in 2020 after a landslide hit the store, and was later demolished.

== See also ==
- List of supermarket chains
  - List of supermarket chains in Canada
  - List of supermarket chains in Oceania
  - List of supermarket chains in the United States
