= Market Fresh =

Supermarket chain in Quebec, Canada

Market Fresh logo

Market Fresh (or called Marché Frais in French) was a Gatineau, Quebec-based supermarket chain which specialized in fresh food products including fruits, vegetables, dairy, breads, and prepared-products including some meat.

The company was founded in 1991 by Gatineau area businessman Jean-Luc Brazeau. While the first years of operations were concentrated in the Outaouais side of the National Capital Region, stores were later opened all across Ottawa until 2004.

After enjoying some success, especially in the Outaouais in which it won an award from the Outaouais Chamber of Commerce in 1996, the company started to endure several financial difficulties most notably due to the fierce competition by local business Farm Boy which sells similar products.

By the start of 2006, Market Fresh decided to concentrate its activities once again in Gatineau only due to decreasing profits from the Ontario stores. All stores, including the newest ones in Kanata and Bayshore Shopping Centre, were closed before that same year ended. The Bayshore location, which filled some of the gap left by the former Les Ailes de la Mode store, was opened for 14 months, while the Kanata location was opened for an even shorter period. Stores that opened in 1998 at St. Laurent Shopping Centre and Place d'Orleans as well as the first Ottawa store in Vanier and the Bank Street location were also affected. Workers were only informed one day prior to the closure.

A criminal fire destroyed its Aylmer store in 2005 but it re-opened several months later. However, like the Ottawa stores, it was closed on January 2, 2008, for financial reasons.

In 2006, the company faced bankruptcy but avoided it after an offer was accepted and kept its current four Gatineau stores open for business, saving over 200 jobs in the region.

The last remaining store in Gatineau had closed down in 2012.

== See also ==
- List of Canadian supermarkets
