= BowMac sign =

Structure in Vancouver, Canada

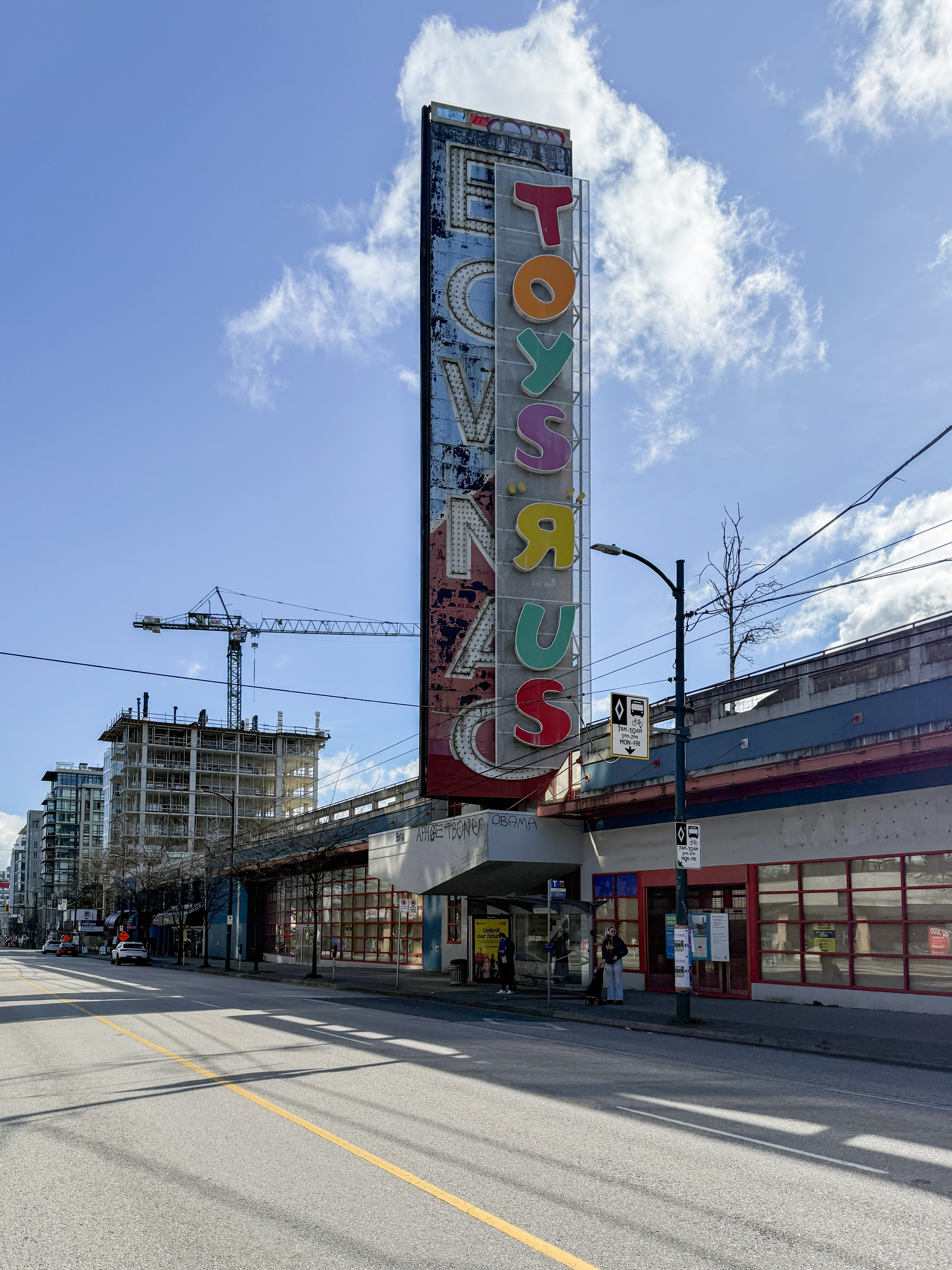
- The BowMac sign was replaced by FreshCo in 2026

General information
- Architectural style: Neon
- Location: 1154-1176 West Broadway; Vancouver, British Columbia, Canada
- Coordinates: 49.263334°N 123.130839°W
- Construction started: 1958
- Client: Bowell McLean

Technical details
- Size: 29m

The BowMac sign, known as "Toys "R" BowMac" and "Toymac", is a neon sign in Vancouver, British Columbia, with a metal screen that depicted the Toys "R" Us logo covering a significant portion of the original sign. It stands at 1154-1176 West Broadway, a Toys "R" Us store. It was designated by the City of Vancouver as a landmark worthy of preservation and revitalization in 1997. The sign remains a landmark of Vancouver, but is also a topic of contention for its unsightly appearance and exceptionally large size.

== Early history ==
The Bowell McLean (BowMac) car dealership on West Broadway in Vancouver erected the sign above the business in 1958. The orange sign was covered with hundreds of bulbs and neon lights. It was the largest illuminated structure in Vancouver other than the BC Electric Building downtown and recognized as North America's largest freestanding sign. The billboard was visible from 18 miles away.

In the 1950s, Vancouver was the North American neon capital for its large number of signs, the artisanship involved, and the technology on display. Vancouver was recognisable from the air by the glow. The BowMac was the largest, most recognizable, and most central sign. It has a font, design, and shape distinct to the era. These considerations led to designation as a landmark worthy of heritage conservation in May 1997.

However, as the neon craze of 1950s Vancouver began to disappear in the 1960s, many signs were outlawed by stricter bylaws. The BowMac sign stood into the 1990s, when desires to demolish it surfaced.

Urbanex Development Corporation began construction of a retail centre on the former Bowmac car dealership site and approached Vancouver City Planning staff in Fall 1996 to retain the non-conforming Bowmac sign structure and to replace the text with "Toys 'R' Us". Initially, staff and Urbanex worked collaboratively, but failed to find a mutually agreeable solution that would retain sufficient character of the sign while meeting the corporate logo and budget requirements. A demolition permit was issued. Subsequent discussions led to the design concept as it stands today.

The city's planning and heritage departments passed legislation in 1997 to preserve it.

== Toys "R" Us and Freshco redesign ==
The old sign was preserved by City of Vancouver as a historical artifact. The letters spelling out "BOW MAC" were preserved, but not self-illuminated, and were partially covered by a highly perforated 3/4 inch metal screen bearing the Toys 'R' Us logo in the corporate primary colours, internally self-illuminated. The Heritage Commission accepted this compromise which obscured the original artifact, but not completely, and utilizing a new metal screen that conserved it. In 2026, Freshco took of the lease and placed their branding over a top the Toys ‘R’ Us brand.

== Controversy ==
As part of the application review, 287 neighbors were notified, 19 responded: 2 in support and 17 against.

The principle objections expressed were:

- Toys 'R' Us should conform to the Sign By-law as other businesses;
- the sign would set a precedent for signs on Broadway;
- the sign is an earthquake hazard;
- the sign does not merit heritage status;
- the changing of the sign indicates that it did not merit heritage status;
- light and noise from the sign would greatly impact adjoining residential buildings.

Detractors say that it is ugly and clashes with the multicoloured logo of Toys "R" Us; that it looks ridiculous; that it stands out in the conservative landscape of West Broadway.

The sign's heritage status allows it to exist as an exception far beyond the limits of city bylaws: the sign itself is 215% the permitted height and 1823% larger than the allowed area.

Suggestions that the sign was an earthquake hazard and that it was going to make too much noise and light pollution were addressed; the site was deemed to be acceptably earthquake-resistant, and the power was restricted between 10pm and 4am.
