= Place Vertu =

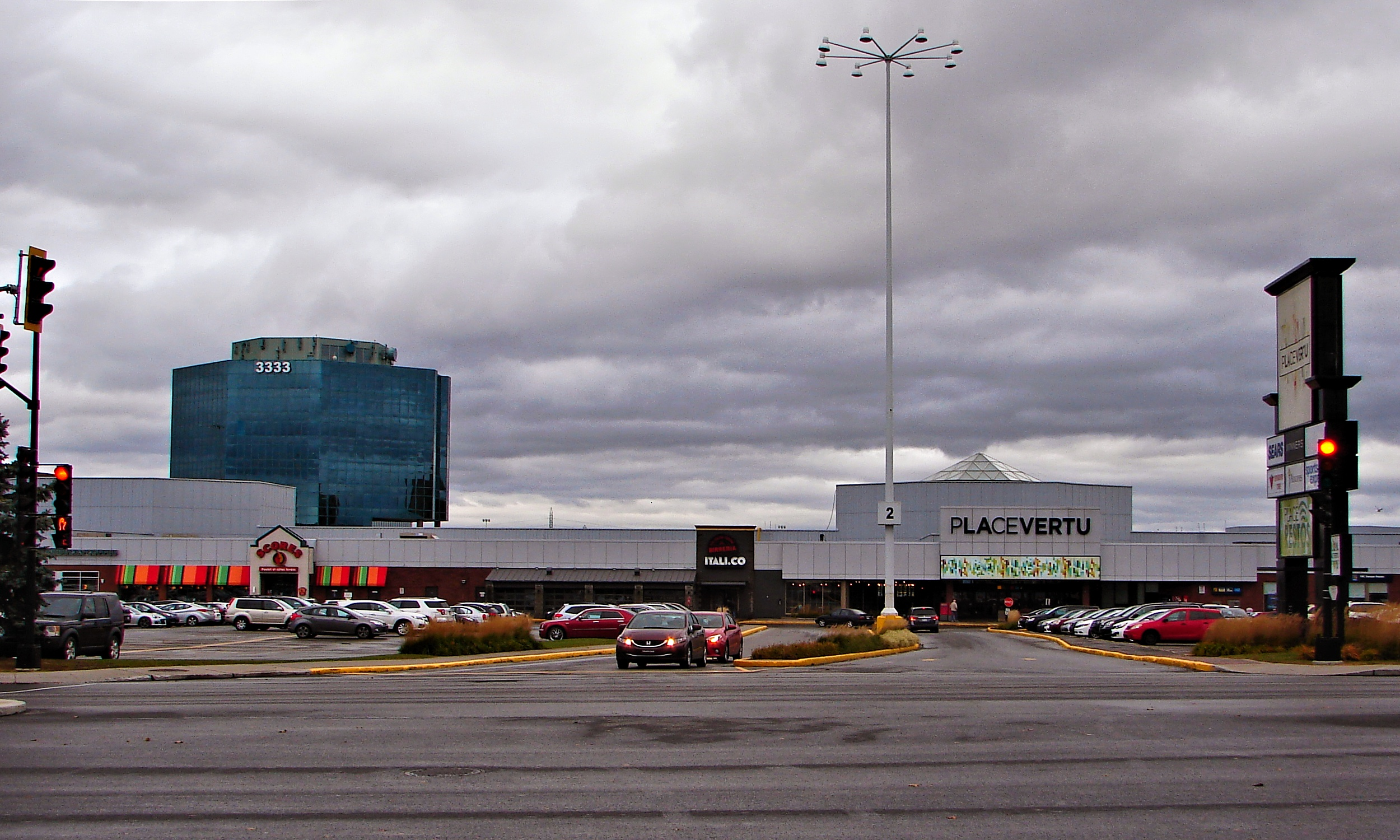
- Location: Montreal, Quebec
- Coordinates: 45.498767°N 73.706631°W
- Address: 3131, boulevard de la Côte-Vertu; Saint-Laurent, Quebec, Canada; H4R 1Y8
- Opened: August 28, 1975
- Developer: Cambridge Leaseholds Limited
- Manager: McCOR
- Owner: JADCO Corporation
- Num. of stores: 155
- Num. of anchor tenants: 5
- Floor area: 735,847 sq ft (68,362.4 m^{2})
- Floors: 1 (excluding highrise building)
- Parking: Outdoor or multi-level
- Public transit: STM bus; Exo bus services
- Website: www.placevertu.com/en/

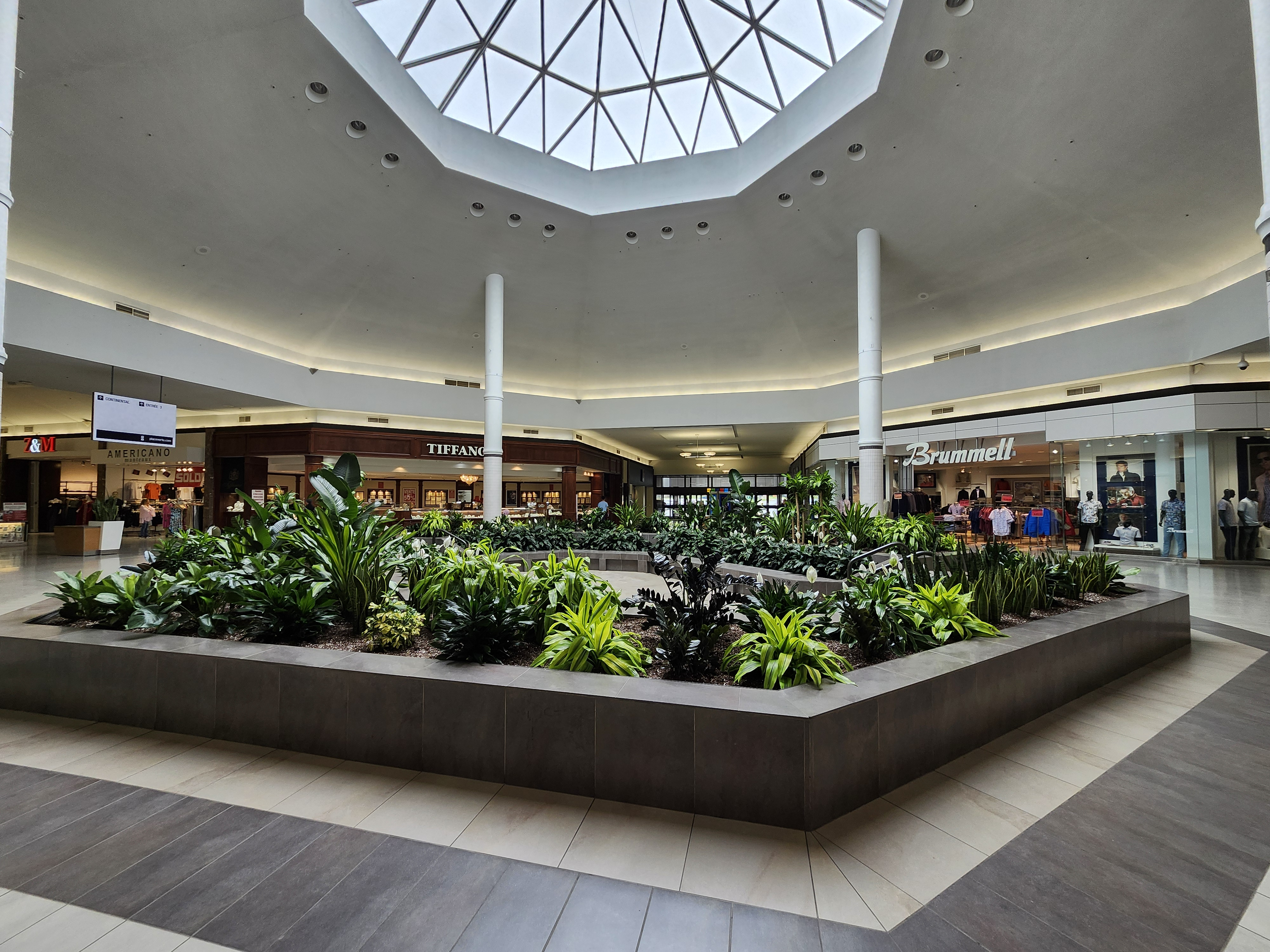
Place Vertu atrium in 2025

Place Vertu is a shopping mall in the borough of Saint-Laurent in Montreal, Quebec, Canada. It is located on Côte-Vertu Boulevard, at the corner of Cavendish Boulevard, and has a high-rise building.

== Stores ==
Anchors are Canadian Tire, Marché Adonis, Sports Experts/Atmosphere, Winners, Dollarama, and Uniprix. There is also a food court. The mall has many outlets.

== History ==
Place Vertu's anchors on its debut on August 28, 1975 were The Bay, Kmart and Dominion for a total of 110 stores. Although Sears was also among the original tenants that signed with Place Vertu, it opened its doors two months after the other stores on October 29. Place Vertu was originally the property of Cambridge Leaseholds with co-ownership by both Simpsons-Sears and the Hudson's Bay Company. It was one of Cambridge's only shopping malls in the province of Quebec. At its opening, Place Vertu was larger than Fairview Pointe-Claire and it also briefly surpassed Galeries d'Anjou which was being expanded at the time. The only shopping centre in the Montreal area that was larger than Place Vertu during that period was Carrefour Laval.

The mall was expanded in the 1980s when a corridor was added, going from the center court to a new Pascal's hardware store. Another corridor with an office tower was added in the mid-1980s from The Bay to Pascal's.

Dominion was converted into a Provigo on July 13, 1981, Pascal's former space occupied by Zellers in 1991, Provigo was converted once more into a Maxi in 1994 and Kmart's former store space was occupied by Canadian Tire in 2000. Maxi closed in 2001. The Bay closed in May 2007; Zellers relocated to The Bay's vacated location in the same year.

In 2001, Cambridge merged with Ivanhoe to become Ivanhoe Cambridge; Place Vertu became the property of this combined company. Ten years later, in 2011, Ivanhoe Cambridge sold the mall to Primaris REIT.

Since 2008, the mall has been renovated and now include tenants such as Urban Planet, Dollarama, Laura/Laura+/Laura Petite Outlet, Browns Outlet, Starbucks Coffee (taking Subway's old space after that location moved to the food court). Marché Adonis took the space of Maxi in 2009. Additionally, the mall space between Zellers and the food court was turned into a Winners (which had moved from the strip mall across the street) and the existing tenants from this section were relocated elsewhere in the mall. Zellers old space (formerly Pascal's) remained empty, but was replaced by Gold's Gym in 2012.

After more than 20 years in the mall, Zellers closed in December 2012 and was succeeded the following year by Target, but it was closed in 2015, and Sports Experts/Atmosphere relocated to that space in November 10, 2016, using only 53,000 sq ft (4,900 m^{2}) of the emplacement.

Sears closed in October 2017 and is replaced by Continental/Joe Fresh.

== Public transit ==
STM buses stop around the mall, while the Exo buses stop nearby at Côte-Vertu and Beaulac.

Société de transport de Montréal
No.	Route
121	Sauvé / Côte-Vertu
128	Saint-Laurent
171	Henri-Brouassa
174	Côte-Vertu Ouest
177	Thimens
196	Parc-Industriel Lachine
213	Parc-Industriel Saint-Laurent
225	Hymus
371 ☾	Décarie

Exo La Presqu'Île sector
No.	Route
40	Express Vaudreuil - Terminus Côte-Vertu
Exo Laurentides sector
No.	Route
499	Service Express Terminus Côte-Vertu / Deux-Montagnes

== See also ==
- List of largest shopping malls in Canada
- List of malls in Montreal
- List of shopping malls in Canada
