= List of supermarket chains in Canada =

This is a list of supermarket chains in Canada. For supermarkets operating in other countries, see List of supermarket chains.

== Major chains ==
- Empire operates
  - Lawtons
  - Needs Convenience
  - Farm Boy
  - Foodland some CO-OP stores in Atlantic Canada
  - FreshCo
  - IGA / IGA Extra in Alberta, Manitoba, Quebec, some parts of Atlantic Canada formerly CO-OP Atlantic and Saskatchewan only
  - Safeway
  - Sobeys
  - Thrifty Foods
  - Pete's Frootique
  - Longo's (Sobeys has purchased 51% of Longo's, with an option to buy the remaining shares within the next 10 years)
- Loblaw Companies operates
  - Dominion
  - Les Entrepôts Presto
  - Extra Foods
  - Fortinos
  - Freshmart
  - L'Intermarché
  - Loblaws / Loblaw GreatFood / Loblaws CityMarket
  - Maxi / Maxi & Cie
  - No Frills
  - Provigo
  - Real Atlantic Superstore
  - Real Canadian Superstore
  - Shoppers Drug Mart / Pharmaprix
  - SuperValu
  - T & T Supermarket
  - Valu-mart
  - Your Independent Grocer / Independent CityMarket
  - Zehrs Markets
- Metro Inc. operates
  - Food Basics
  - Marché Adonis
  - Metro / Metro Plus
  - Super C
- Pattison Food Group operates
  - Bulkley Valley Wholesale
  - Buy-Low Foods
  - Choices Markets
  - Everything Wine
  - Meinhardt Fine Foods
  - Nature’s Fare Markets
  - Nesters Market
  - PriceSmart Foods
  - Quality Foods
  - Save-On-Foods
  - Urban Fare

== Regional chains ==
- Asian Food Centre
- Co-op Atlantic
- Coppa's Fresh Market
- Country Grocer
- Calgary Co-op
- Fairway Markets
- Federated Co-operatives Ltd. affiliated store brands including:
  - Lake Country Co-Op
  - Otter Co-op
  - Red River Co-op
  - Saskatoon Co-op
  - Sherwood Co-op
  - Mid Island Co-op
- Galati Market Fresh
- Georgia Main Food Group (food operations of H.Y. Louie) operates
  - IGA / MarketPlace IGA in British Columbia only
  - Fresh St. Market (British Columbia)
- Grande Cheese (Greater Toronto Area)
- H Mart
- Highland Farms
- Le Jardin Mobile
- Seafood City
- The North West Company

== Non-conventional banners with in-store grocery markets ==
- Costco
- Dollarama
- IKEA
- Jean Coutu Group
- London Drugs, subsidiary of H.Y. Louie
- Walmart Canada
- Whole Foods Market
- Pusateri's (downsized in 2024 to one store location plus one food service outlet)
- Giant Tiger
- M&M Food Market

== Defunct chains ==
- A&P
- Commisso's Food Markets
- Cooper's Foods
- Dominion Stores
- Food City
- Galati Brothers
- Kmart Canada
- Knob Hill Farms
- Loeb
- Marché Frais
- Miracle Food Mart
- Overwaitea Foods
- Piggly Wiggly
- Price Chopper
- Sav-A-Centre
- SaveEasy
- Steinberg's Supermarkets
- Sam's Club
- Target Canada
- Ultra Food & Drug
- Woodward's Food Floors

== See also ==
- List of Canadian stores
- List of supermarket chains in North America
- List of supermarket chains in South America
