= Super C (supermarket) =

Quebecois discount supermarket chain

- Trade name: Super C
- Formerly: Super Carnaval (1983–1991)
- Company type: Division
- Industry: Retail supermarket
- Founded: 1982
- Headquarters: Montreal, Quebec, Canada
- Products: Bakery, beer, dairy, deli products, frozen foods, general grocery, liquor*, meat & poultry, produce, seafood, snacks, wine * Select locations
- Parent: Metro Inc.
- Website: www.superc.ca

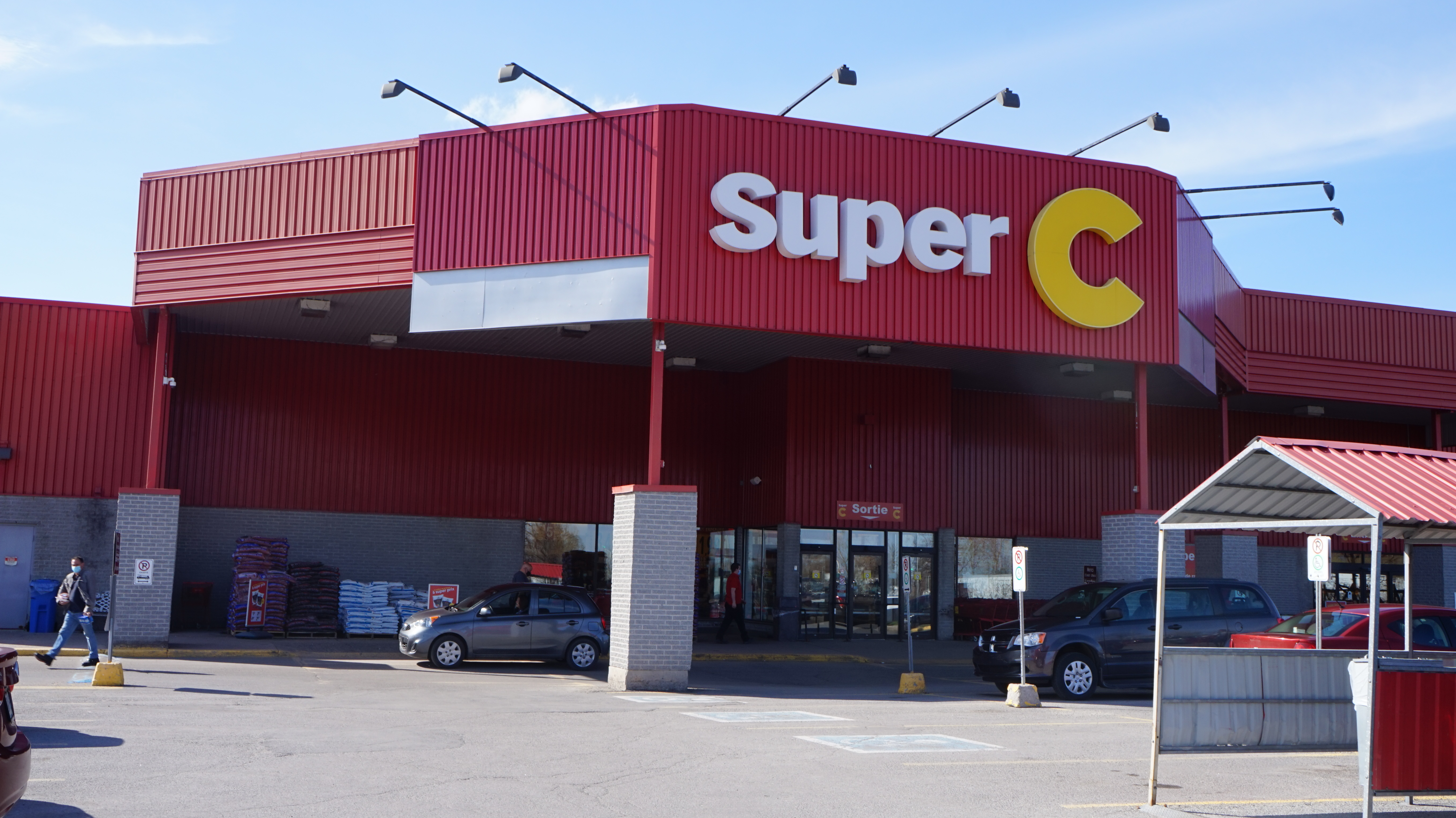
The Super C (Hull location) in Gatineau, QC

Super C is a discount supermarket chain with 101 stores in Quebec. The stores average 4,103 square metres (44,164 sq ft) in size. Super C offers 8,000 products including some 1,200 products from the Super C private label brand.

Super C traces its origins as La Ferme Carnaval founded on September 15, 1982 which opened a supermarket under the trade name Super Carnaval in January 1983 in Beauport, Quebec. By January 1985, Super Carnaval had three stores in Quebec City and another three in the Montreal area.

Super Carnaval's head office was relocated from Quebec City to Lasalle, Quebec on October 20, 1986. The company was acquired by Metro-Richelieu on June 1, 1987 from Toronto-based Burnac Corporation.

In 1991, the 14 Super Carnaval outlets were converted in phases to the new banner Super C with the last stores renamed by May 1992. Since then, Super C has expanded by either obtaining the lease of vacant shopping mall anchor spaces, building its own free-standing stores or replacing Metro-branded locations. Only a handful of today's Super C outlets are former Super Carnaval grocery stores.

In mid-2006, all but one of the nine remaining Ontario stores were converted to Food Basics or Loeb stores. The Pembroke, Ontario store closed, and the building is now occupied by Value Village.

== Advertising slogans ==
- 1998–2004: "Alimentation aux Meilleurs Prix!" ("Food at the Best Prices!"; used in stores in Quebec)
- 1998–2004: "Fresh Food for Less!" (used in Ontario stores and in English media in Ontario and Quebec)
- 2004–2006: "Where food prices are lower every day" (used in Ontario stores and in English media in Ontario and Quebec)
- 2004-2009/10: "C'est le meilleur Marché" ("It's the best market", and has double meaning of "It's the best deal")
- 2009–present: "Beau, bon, pas cher" ("Beautiful, good, cheap")

== Private labels ==
- Selection
- Éconochoix / Econochoice
- Irresistibles
- Super C
- Loeb Bakery Shoppe
- The Event Pleaser
- Red Grill Meats

== See also ==
- Food Basics
- Maxi (Canadian supermarket)
- List of supermarket chains in Canada
