= Food City (Canada) =

Canadian supermarket chain

- Industry: Supermarket
- Defunct: 1998
- Fate: Sold to Sobeys in 1998 and rebranded Price Chopper, now FreshCo
- Products: Meats/Deli, Produce, Frozen goods, Canned goods
- Parent: Oshawa Group

Food City or Food Town were Canadian supermarkets operated by the Toronto-based Oshawa Group. The stores were often paired with department store chain Towers, also owned by Oshawa Group.

A typical Food City store had:

- Meats/deli
- Produce
- Frozen goods
- Canned goods

The stores employed a plastic numbered basket system at the checkout that would be placed onto rollers and/or a conveyor and then is loaded by staff at a drive-through. This system, which is becoming increasingly rare, is commonly referred to as parcel pickup or car order.

Smaller stores were re-branded as Food Town; the Food City name disappeared after the sale of the parent company to Sobeys in 1998. Many of the locations became Price Chopper stores, currently known as FreshCo.

== See also ==
- List of Canadian supermarkets
