= Coppa's Fresh Market =

Canadian region supermarket chain in the Greater Toronto area

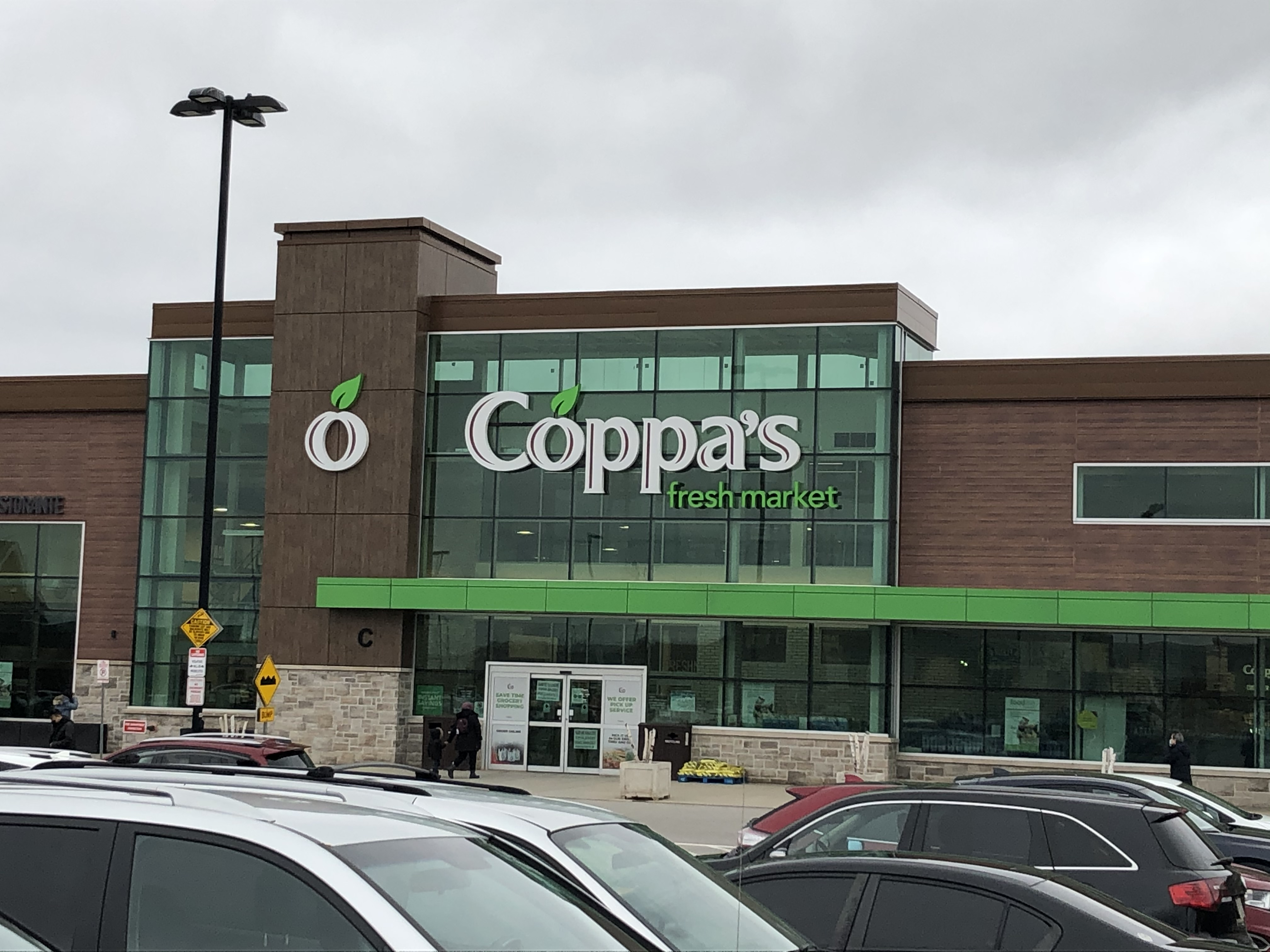
- Coppa's Fresh Market in King City, ON
- Type: Private
- Industry: Supermarket retail
- Founded: 2013 in North York, Ontario
- Founder: Louie Coppa
- Headquarters: 4750 Dufferin Street; Toronto, Ontario; M3H 5S7
- Number of locations: 1
- Area served: Greater Toronto Area
- Owner: Louie Coppa
- Website: www.coppas.com

Coppa's Fresh Market is a Canadian family-owned grocery store located in Scarborough, Ontario. It previously operated three other stores in its regional supermarket chain in the Greater Toronto Area. Charles and John Louis "Louie" Coppa originally founded the Highland Farms grocery store chain in 1963; however, the Coppa family split the company between the two brothers in 2013 with three former Highland Farms stores (the North York, Vaughan, and one of the Scarborough locations) being rebranded as Coppa's Fresh Market under a new company owned by Louie Coppa.

In 2015, it established the "Nonna Francesca" private label, named after the owner's grandmother. At launch, the label included fresh pasta, pasta sauces, pizza, and frozen entrees.

== Locations ==
The supermarket chain consists of one store, in Scarborough. A store operated in Downtown Toronto called Market 63 was opened in February 2019, but shuttered in January 2022. The North York location shut down in March 2026. The King City location was opened in August 2016 and shuttered in May 2026.

== See also ==
- List of supermarket chains in Canada
