= Grande Cheese =

Grocery chain in the Greater Toronto Area, Canada

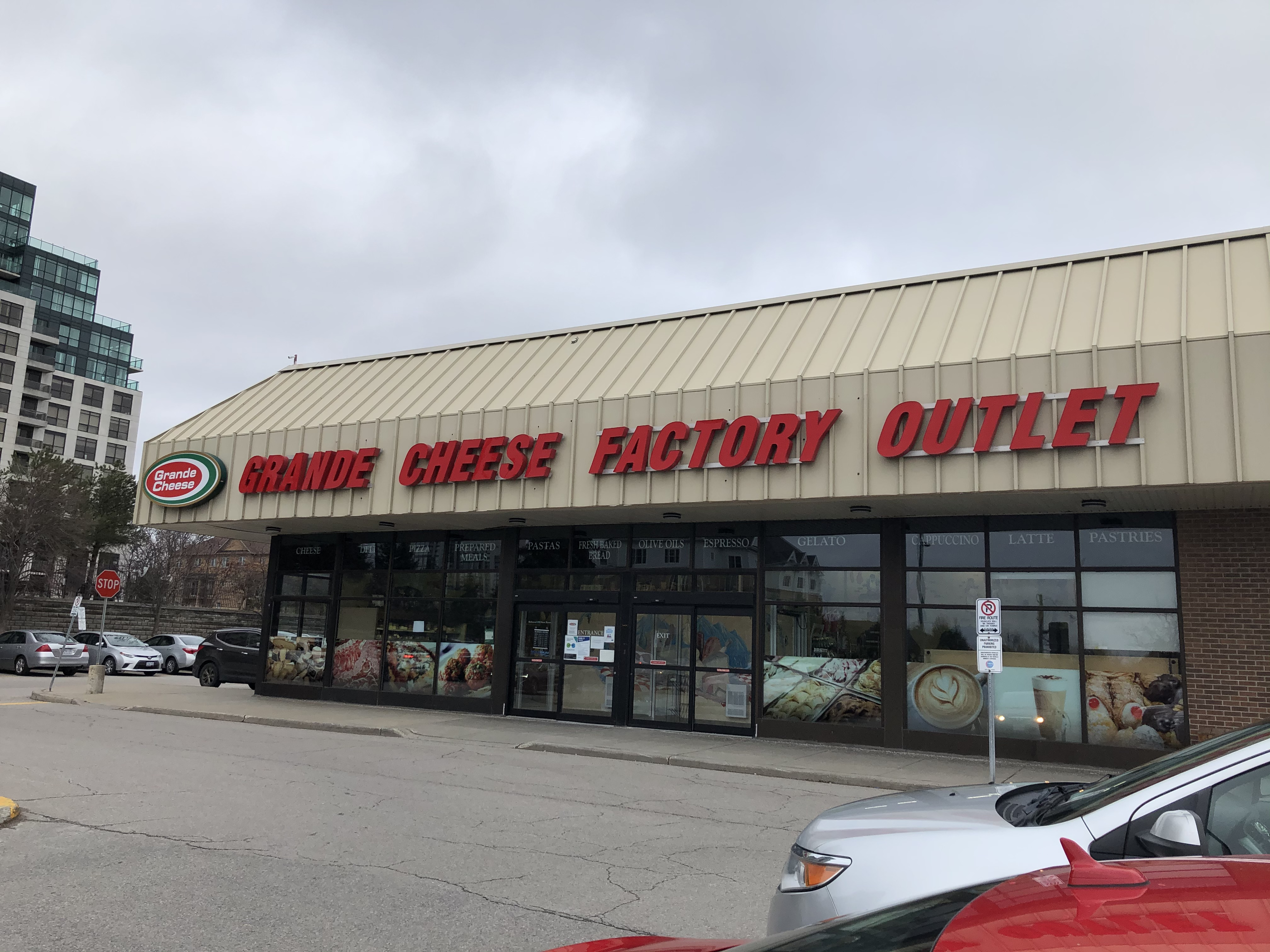
- Grande Cheese in Richmond Hill, Ontario
- Company type: Private
- Industry: Retail supermarket
- Founded: 1958 in Orangeville, Ontario, Canada
- Founder: Marco Contardi
- Headquarters: Toronto, Ontario, Canada
- Number of locations: 5
- Area served: Greater Toronto Area
- Products: Bakery, dairy, delicatessen, frozen foods, general grocery, meat and poultry, produce, snacks
- Website: http://grandecheese.ca/

Grande Cheese is a privately owned grocery chain in the Greater Toronto Area, Ontario, Canada. Its corporate office is located in Toronto, and had been previously located in Orangeville.

== History ==
Grande Cheese was founded in 1958 by Italian immigrant Marco Contardi who immigrated to Canada in 1955 from Anzano di Puglia, Apulia. Before he immigrated to Canada, Contardi worked for a landlord tending to his sheep and cows where he learned to be a cheesemaker. Upon arriving in Canada, Contardi soon opened Grande Cheese on a small farm in Orangeville, delivering their cheeses to Italian grocery stores, restaurants, and bakeries.

During the 1960s, after a third party marketing and delivery system of milk was established, Grande Cheese moved closer to Toronto, a 5,000-square-foot (460 m^{2}) on Milvan Drive. Later, Grande Cheese expanded to a 50,000-square-foot (4,600 m^{2}) facility in Vaughan.

== Locations ==
Five locations:

- Toronto (2)
- Vaughan (2)
- Richmond Hill

== See also ==
- List of supermarket chains in Canada
