= Highland Farms =

Canadian supermarket chain

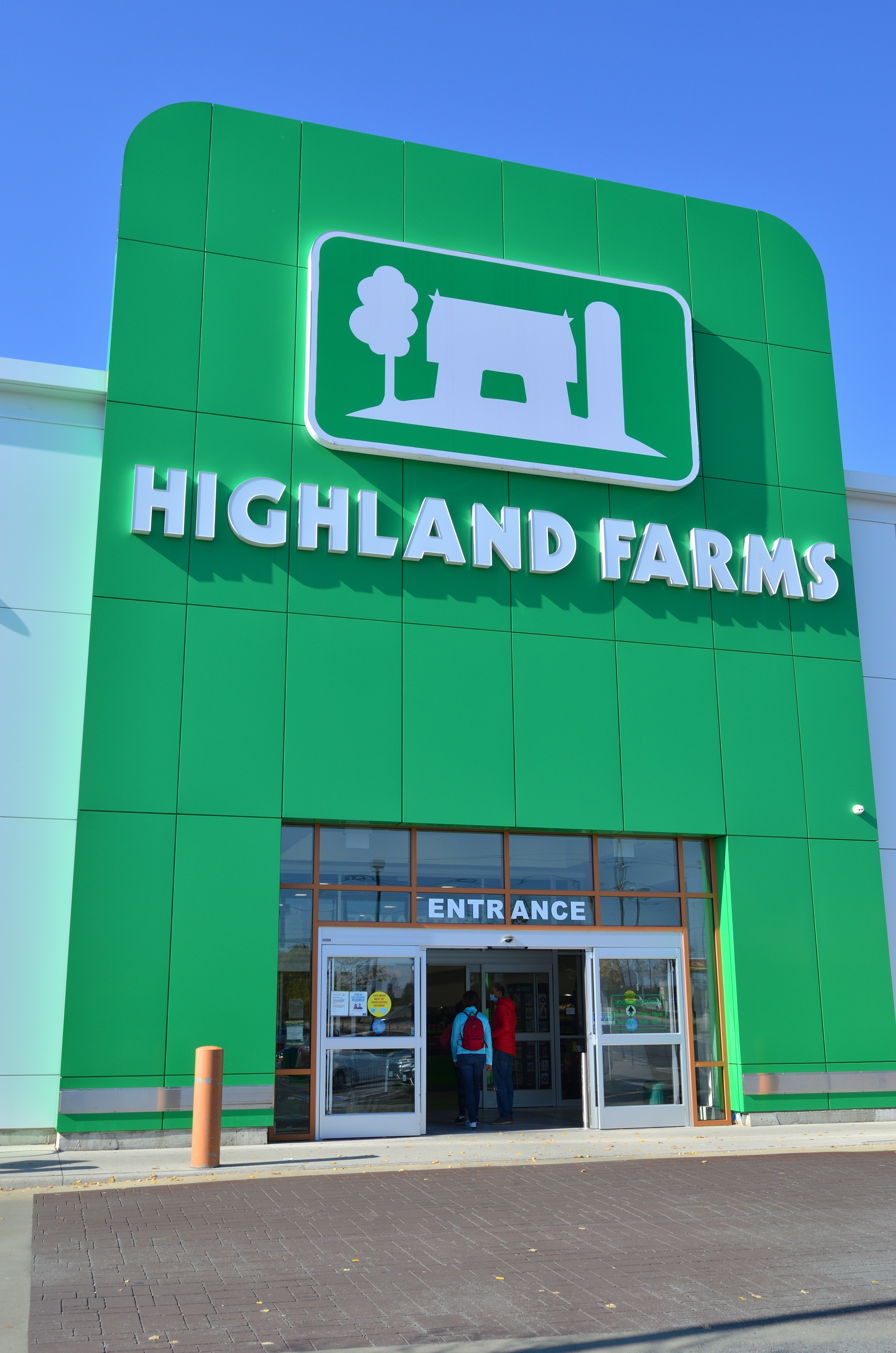
- Highland Farms in Vaughan, ON
- Type: Private
- Industry: Supermarket retail
- Founded: 1963 in Toronto, Ontario
- Founders: Charles Coppa; Louie Coppa
- Headquarters: 50 Matheson Blvd. E., Mississauga, Ontario, Canada
- Number of locations: 1
- Area served: Greater Toronto Area
- Owner: Charles Coppa
- Website: www.highlandfarms.ca

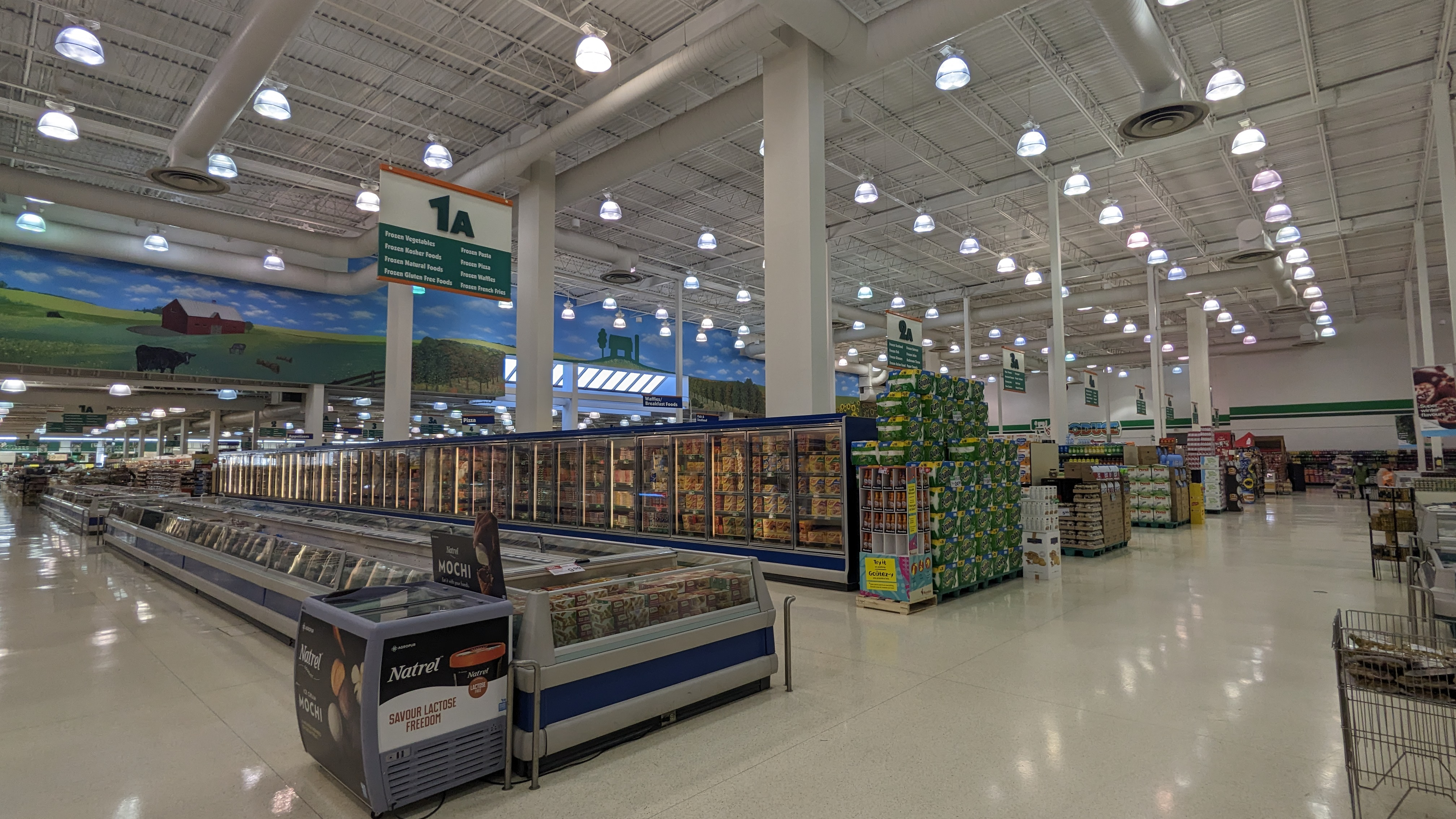
Interior of the former Mississauga store

Highland Farms Inc. is a Canadian family-owned regional supermarket chain in the Greater Toronto Area. Highland Farms was founded in 1963 by brothers Charles Coppa and John Louis "Louie" Coppa, with their first location at 1558 Queen Street West in Toronto. Highland Farms grew from operating a single moderately sized grocery outlet to five locations (at its peak) across the GTA in Vaughan, Scarborough, Mississauga and North York.

The Coppa family split the company between the two brothers in 2013 with three former Highland Farms stores in North York, Vaughan, and Scarborough being rebranded as Coppa's Fresh Market under a new company owned by Louie Coppa.

== Locations ==
The supermarket chain consists of one store in Scarborough. Their flagship store in Mississauga closed on November 23, 2025. and the Vaughan location closed on August 26, 2026.

== See also ==
- List of supermarket chains in Canada
