= Oshawa Group =

Defunct Canadian grocery company

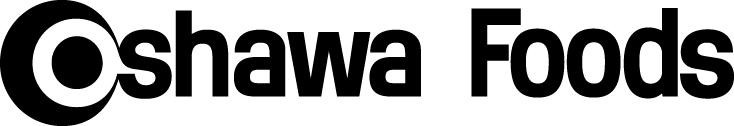
- Industry: Supermarket, Retail, Wholesale, Real estate
- Founded: 1957
- Defunct: 1998
- Fate: Acquired by Sobeys
- Headquarters: 302 The East Mall, Toronto, Ontario
- Products: bakery, charcuterie, clothing, dairy, deli, frozen foods, garden centre, general grocery, general merchandise, meat & poultry, pharmacy, photo-lab, produce, seafood, snacks, consumer goods

The Oshawa Group was a leading owner of supermarkets in Ontario, Canada. It was purchased by Empire Company Limited (Owner of Sobeys) in 1998. The Company was based in Etobicoke and traded on the Toronto and Montreal stock exchanges.

== History ==
Founded in 1957 as Oshawa Wholesale Limited, the Company grew from expansion in the 1960's to 1980's. It was renamed the Oshawa Group Limited in 1971. The company roots date back further to 1914 by founders Max Wolfe (1893–1987) and Maurice Wolfe, who started the Ontario Produce Company and acquired Oshawa Wholesale in 1949 and later gave rise to Oshawa Group.

== Notable people ==
Through the life of the company it was run by the Wolfe family:

- Max and Maurice Wolfe - the Lithuanian Jewish immigrants founded Oshawa Wholesalers in 1957 and Ontario Produce Co. in 1914
- 1950s–1976 Ray D. Wolfe, President
- Harvey Wolfe, President
- Raphael Wolfe, President, CEO and Chair
- Jonathan Wolfe, final President and COO

== Retail units ==
Beginning in the 1960s, Oshawa Group acquired various retail chains and stores:

- Dutch Boy
- Dutch Girl
- Rite-Way Department Store 1966
- IGA 1964
- Bassin Food chain 1964
- Tradition Market Fresh Food
- Knechtel
- Pharma Plus Drug Stores - acquired in 1988 from Boots Drug Stores and once owned by Loblaws operating as Tamblyn Drugs; sold to Katz Group of Companies
- Kent Drugs Limited 1968
- Rockower of Canada Limited 1968
- Food City and later as Food Town - converted by Oshawa Group to Price Chopper
- Price Chopper discount supermarket chain, rebranded to FreshCo some time after Oshawa Group was purchased by Sobeys.
- Towers Department Stores 1967 - acquired as Allied Towers Merchants Limited and ceased operations in 1991 with store locations sold to Zellers)
- Consumers Distributing Company Limited - sold 50% stake in 1978
- Coinamatic Laundry Equipment - sold 90% stake in 1978
- acquired Dominion Stores Limited's operations in Nova Scotia and Safeway's stores in Southern Ontario 1985

== Non-retail units ==
Outside of retailing, Oshawa Group acquired various companies and real estate:

- Field Fresh Farms (Dairy)
- Dominion Mushroom Company 1963 - sold 1986

Oshawa Group also operated food services company SERCA Foodservices Incorporated.

- Marchland Holdings Limited 1971
- Baxter Estates 1975 - owned and managed apartment in Winnipeg and shopping centre in Calgary; sold 1978
- Systems Construction Limited - modular home builder
- Codville Distributors Limited 1972
- Decarie Square shopping mall in Montreal 1976 - sold 1986

== Decline ==
The Oshawa Group began re-focusing on core operations in the 1980s, but its business was impacted hard by changes in the retail scene during the 1990s. The entire operation was sold in 1998 to Sobeys and the Oshawa name disappeared from Canadian retailing.

== See also ==
- Loblaws
