= Red River Co-op =

Canadian supermarket chain

Red River Cooperative Limited
- Type: Cooperative
- Industry: Petroleum; Groceries
- Headquarters: Winnipeg, Manitoba
- Number of locations: 42 (2020)
- Revenue: $539.7 million CAD (2013)
- Net income: $61.5 million CAD (2013)
- Total assets: $161 million CAD (2010)
- Members: 312,000+ (2020)
- Website: www.redriverco-op.crs

Red River Cooperative Limited, branded as Red River Co-op, is a retail cooperative. A member of Federated Co-operatives, it operates in Winnipeg, Manitoba, Canada.

== Operations ==
As of 2022, it operates nine Red River Co-op supermarkets, including five in Winnipeg and one each in Gimli, Stonewall, Lorette, and Selkirk. It also operates gas bars and convenience stores throughout the Winnipeg Metropolitan Region and surrounding areas, as well as Northwestern Ontario.

== History ==
In 1948 Red River Co-op opened their first food stores in Winnipeg.

In 1983, due to poor financial performance they ceased food store operations; they shifted focus on their gas bar operations.

In 2014, when Sobeys acquired Safeway, they were forced to sell 23 locations by the federal Competition Bureau. Federated Co-operatives acquired four locations in Winnipeg and transferred ownership to Red River Co-op. This marked the resumption of food store operations.

== See also ==
- List of Co-operative Federations
- List of Canadian supermarkets
