= Galati Market Fresh =

Chain of supermarkets in Toronto, Canada

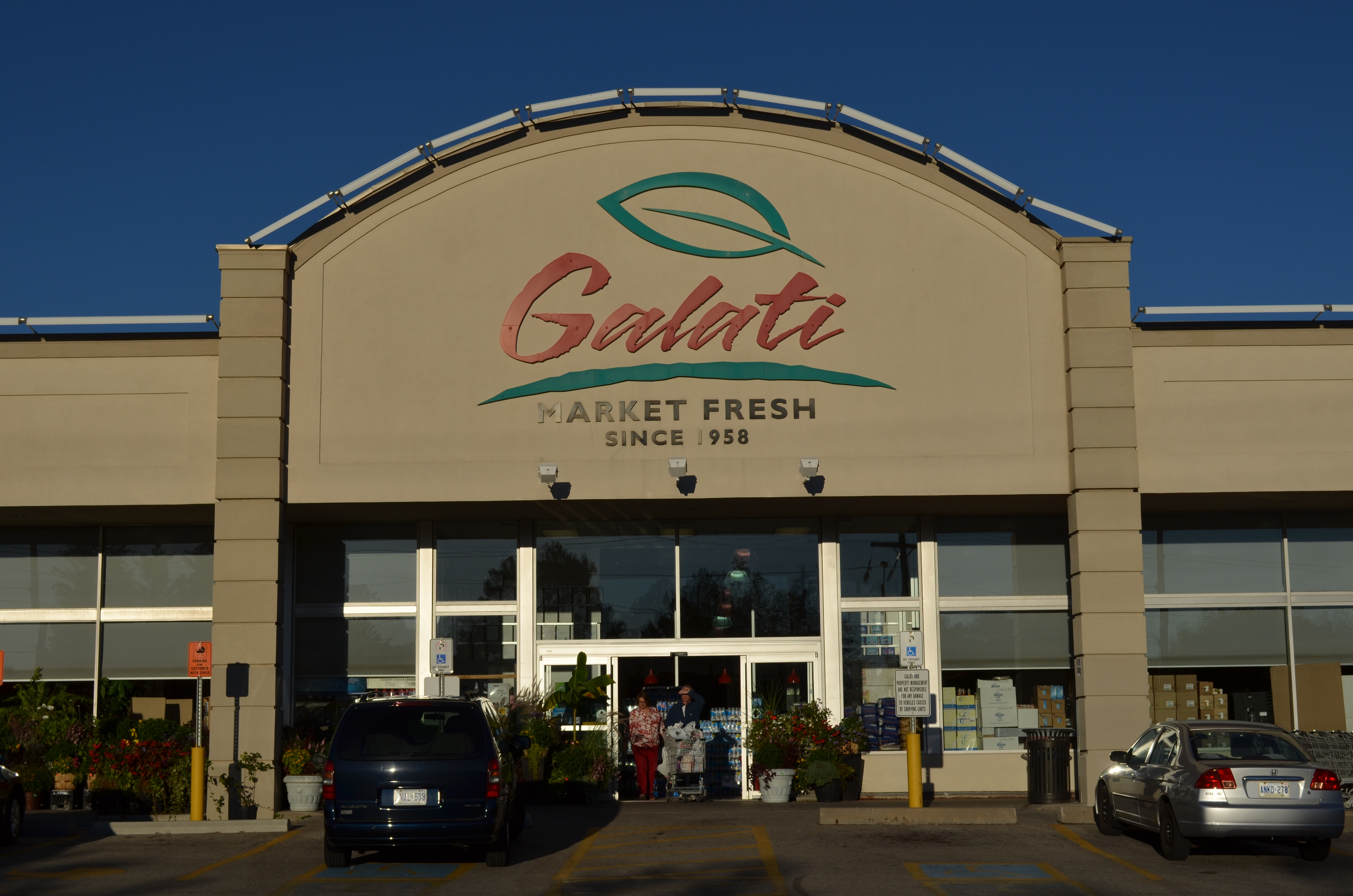
Galati Market Fresh (Leslie Street)

Galati Market Fresh is a small chain of supermarkets in Toronto, founded in 1958. The chain emerged from the Galati Brothers. There is only one location currently in existence:

- 5845 Leslie Street — south of Steeles

Former locations include:

- 4734 Jane Street, North York — near Steeles Avenue West. It is now Pacific Fresh Food Market, a Chinese supermarket.
- 666 Burnhamthorpe Road, Etobicoke — between Hwy 427 & Dixie Rd. It opened 2008 and closed 2013 to become Yi Xing Chinese supermarket and then Shoppers Drug Mart.
- 1105 Wilson Avenue at Keele Street — operated as Galati Brothers. It is now Btrust, a Chinese supermarket.
- 415 The Westway, Etobicoke — one of the first to close; the location is now Shoppers Drug Mart

== See also ==
- List of Canadian supermarkets
