= Calgary Co-op =

Canadian retail cooperative

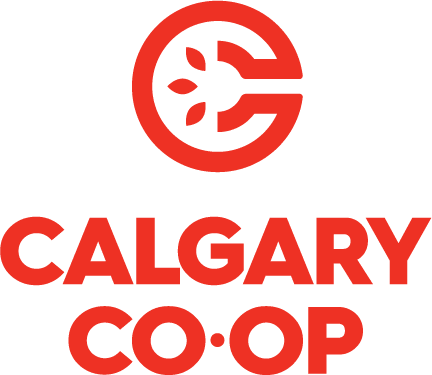
- Type: Cooperative
- Industry: Retail
- Founded: November 1956; 69 years ago
- Headquarters: Calgary, Alberta, Canada
- Products: Groceries; Fuel; Pharmacy; Liquor; Cannabis
- Website: calgarycoop.com

Calgary Co-operative Association Limited, trading as Calgary Co-op, is a retail cooperative operating in Calgary, Alberta, Canada. It was formerly associated with the Federated Co-operatives (FCL) system, but began cutting ties with the organization in 2019.

== History ==
Opened in the 1940s as a food store operated by the United Farmers of Alberta in Calgary and eventually changing hands to the Alberta Co-operative Wholesale Association (ACWA) in 1951, the Calgary Co-operative Association was founded to operate the Calgary food store independently of the ACWA, partially due to member dissatisfaction with how the ACWA managed the venture. The Calgary Co-operative Association purchased the Calgary store from ACWA in 1956 for $58,000.

In August 2019, it was announced that Calgary Co-op had entered into an agreement for its groceries to be supplied by the Alberta arm of Overwaitea Food Group (now Pattison Food Group), owner of commercial competitor Save-On-Foods, beginning in April 2020. The organisation stated that this change would "better serve members and ensure long-term sustainability". Calgary Co-op's High River grocery store will not be part of this change and will continue to be supplied by FCL, as will its petroleum and convenience store operations. FCL criticized Calgary Co-op's decision to switch to a private company as supplier, with its CEO Scott Banda stating that it was "sad to see them moving away from the Co-op family they've helped build".

With the change, the chain migrated to two private label brands: "Founders & Farmers"—which is positioned as a value-oriented brand, and "Cal & Gary's"—which is positioned as a premium brand with nods to the city and its culture. Both brands emphasize the involvement of local producers where applicable. The changes resulted in the closure of FCL's Calgary distribution centre, leading to the loss of 200 jobs.

In April 2020, Calgary Co-op sued FCL for oppressive conduct, alleging that the organization introduced a new "loyalty program" that would offer member co-operatives a quarterly rebate on wholesale petroleum purchases, provided that 90% of their entire stock is purchased via FCL. Calgary Co-op alleged that the loyalty program was in direct retaliation for its agreement with Pattison Food Group, was implemented without consultation from its members, and resulted in an unequal distribution of profits that would harm Calgary Co-op.

In November 2022, Calgary Co-op underwent a rebranding, introducing a new logo that specifically uses "Calgary Co-op"—which had long been the legal and colloquial name for the co-operative—as its public-facing brand rather than "Co-op" for the first time, and announcing plans for a revamped reward program for members.

Amid the ongoing legal dispute, Calgary Co-op pulled out of its fuel supply agreements with FCL in January 2023. In December 2023, a judge ruled that the program resulted in "disproportionate distribution" of FCL profits that directly harmed Calgary Co-op, and ordered FCL to pay out an amount equal to how much it would have received in payments from the loyalty program for fuel purchases between November 2019 and January 2023. The lawsuit exposed patterns of increased animosity between FCL and Calgary Co-op in the lead-up to the Pattison agreement.

== Present operations ==
Calgary Co-op has over 440,000 members, 3400 employees, assets of $441 million and annual sales over $1 billion. Calgary Co-op provides services in food, petroleum, home health care, pharmacy and cannabis.

In January 2023, Calgary Co-op acquired Willow Park Wines & Spirits, a liquor store chain with locations in Alberta and Saskatchewan. In January 2024, Calgary Co-op acquired a majority stake in Vaughan, Ontario-based pharmacy chain Care Pharmacies.

== See also ==
- List of Co-operative Federations
- Supermarkets in Canada
