= Laura (clothing retailer) =

Canadian women's wear boutique chain

Laura's Shoppe Inc.

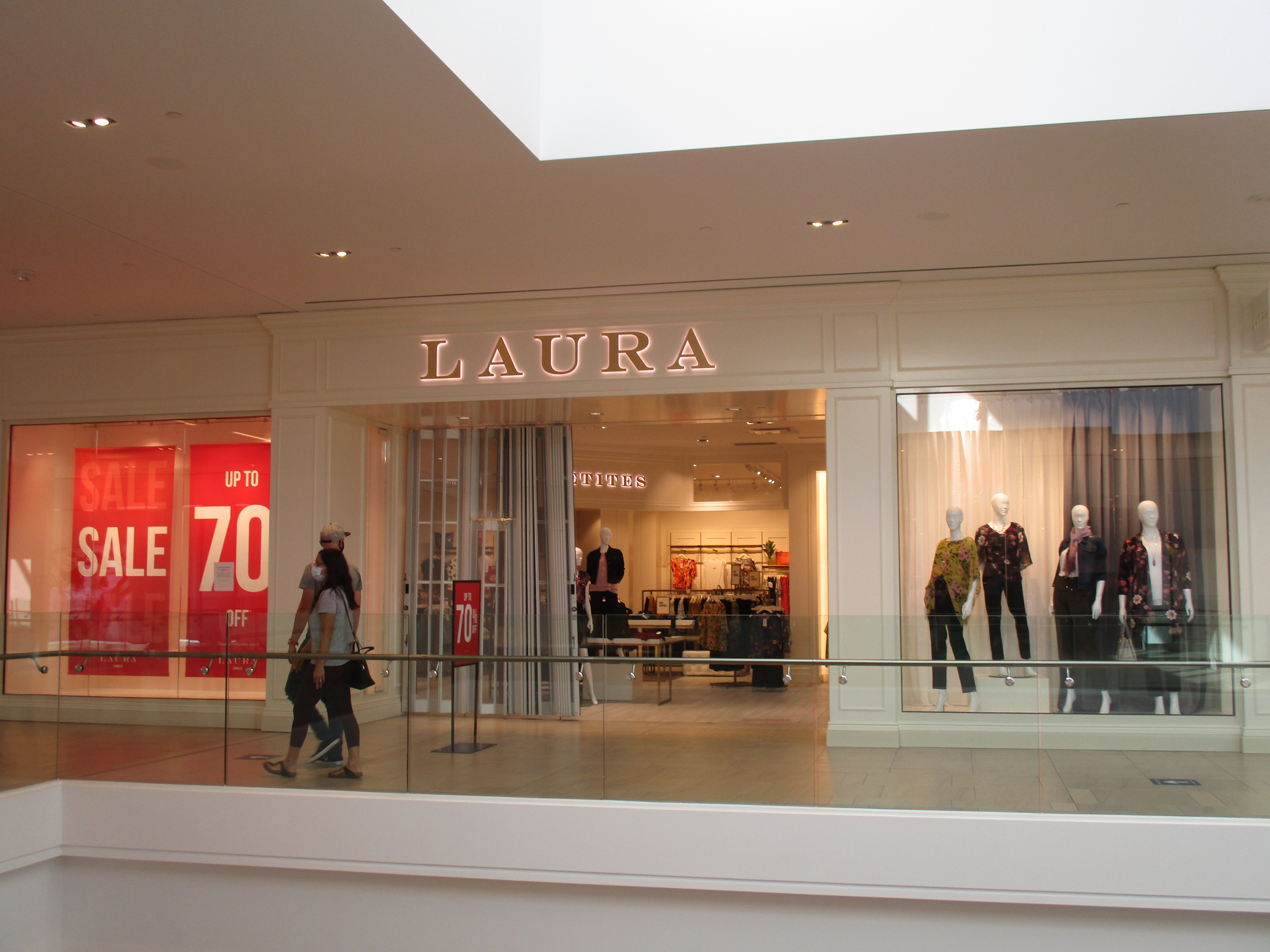
- Trade name: Laura
- Company type: Private
- Industry: Retailer for women's wear
- Founded: 1930; 1989 (Laura Petites); 1995 (Laura Plus); 1984 (Melanie Lyne); 2002 (Laura Superstore)
- Founder: Laura Wolstein
- Headquarters: Laval, Quebec, Canada
- Number of locations: 200; 47 (Melanie Lyne); 71 (Laura Petites); 54 (Laura Plus); 18 (Laura Superstore)
- Divisions: Melanie Lyne, Laura Plus, Laura Petites & Laura
- Website: www.laura.ca

Laura's Shoppe Inc. is a Canadian women’s wear boutique chain founded in 1930 by Laura Wolstein, the first Laura store was located on St. Hubert Street, Montreal.

Laura Canada remained a one-store operation until 1973 when Kalman Fisher, grandson of Laura Wolstein, and now President of Laura Canada, opened a second store in a small shopping centre in the Montreal suburb of St. Laurent. A third store was opened in Place Vertu in 1975, followed by another in les Galeries d'Anjou in 1976.

== Filing for creditor protection ==
In July 2015, Laura filed for creditor protection. According to company's filing, the chain has liabilities of more than $20 million. The chain restructured and emerged from protection four months after filing.

The chain filed for creditor protection once again in 2020, during the global COVID-19 pandemic.
