= Towers Department Stores =

Canadian department store

Towers
- Industry: Discount department store
- Founded: 1960
- Defunct: 1991
- Fate: Converted to the Zellers name
- Parent: Towers Mart 1960-1963; Allied Towers Merchants Limited 1963–1967; Oshawa Group 1967–1991

Towers, operating as Bonimart in Quebec, was a Canadian discount department store chain owned by the Oshawa Group, a now-defunct grocery retailer and distributor.

== History ==
Towers Marts began as a New York-based chain. The first Canadian store was opened on November 15, 1960, in Scarborough, Ontario (at the corner of Lawrence Ave. East and Midland Ave). In March 1962, a group of Towers concessionaires incorporated as Allied Towers Merchants Ltd. After Towers Marts went bankrupt in 1963, Allied Towers Merchants Ltd., purchased the 13 Canadian stores, initially acquiring only 43% of the outstanding shares and eventually getting full control of these Towers stores.

Logo of Bonimart stores in Quebec

In Quebec, the chain traded as Towers in the 1960s. The name was changed to Bonimart in April 1971, starting with the stores in the Greater Montreal, as part of a program by owner Oshawa Group to promote the French character among its subsidiaries in the province.

Each department within Towers stores operated as a licensed concession. Some Towers/Bonimart stores offered services such as restaurants, photo labs, and pharmacies within the store. Some stores were also paired with an IGA or Food City grocery store.

In October 1990, Towers/Bonimart's 51 stores were purchased by Hudson's Bay Company which intended to merge them with its Zellers subsidiary. One store was transferred to The Bay and four others were going to be sold or closed. The transaction was met with strong opposition from the New York-based F. W. Woolworth Company (owner of the Woolco stores in Canada) which also wanted to purchase the chain.

In April 1991, 47 of the Towers/Bonimart stores were rebranded with the Zellers banner. The remaining stores held closeout sales under their original name, some of them lasting until the fall of 1991. While ownership of the Towers name is unclear, the Bonimart trademark is the property of Sobeys, the successor of the Oshawa Group.

== Slogans ==
- "At Towers everything connects - the last day of one sale is the first of the next".
- "Extra Special For Your Family--Towers."
- "You made us part of your family at Towers."
- "Towers. Your family's extra special store."
- "At Towers, we've got the right idea!"

== Mascot ==
Towers' mascot was an animated squirrel named Sparky. At the time of the Zellers buyout, print ads featured Sparky arm-in-arm with Zellers' bear mascot, Zeddy.

== Locations ==
=== Ontario: other than GTA ===
- Barrie (450 Bayfield Street, moved to the Bayfield Mall, closed 1990/1991)
- Belleville
- Bracebridge (505 Muskoka Rd #118W)
- Brantford
- Burlington (Plains Rd W)
- Hamilton (640 Queenston Rd)
- Collingwood (Mountain View Mall)
- Kitchener (700 Strasburg Road at Block Line Road in Forest Glen Shopping Centre)
- London (4465 Wellington Road)
- Niagara Falls (6777 Morrison St)
- North Bay (Hwy 11 north @ McKeown)
- Oakville (Towers store 41) Trafalgar Rd., Oakville, Ontario (Trafalgar Rd. & Leighland Ave. area)
- Ottawa (Hazeldean Mall)
- Ottawa (Shoppers City West)
- Ottawa (Cyrville Rd store #42)
- Owen Sound
- Peterborough (950 Lansdowne St W)
- St. Catharines (366 Bunting Rd @ Carlton St)
- Stratford (now at site of Festival Marketplace Mall - 1067 Ontario Street)
- Sudbury (40 Elm St, inside City Centre Mall)
- Waterloo (70 Bridgeport E. at Erb Street in Towers Plaza); became Zellers in 1991 and later Walmart.
- Welland: 1000 East Main Street. Currently: Canadian Tire Financial Services Limited
- Woodstock (currently Goodlife location)

=== Greater Toronto Area ===
- Brampton (Towers store 46) 400 Queen St. W., Brampton, Ontario (later moved to Kingsport Plaza, Main St. N. (Main St. N. & Williams Pkwy area)
- Bridlewood Mall (Towers store 59) 2900 Warden Ave., Toronto, (Scarborough) Ontario (Warden Ave. & Finch Ave. E. area)
- Dixie Plaza (Towers store 26) 3100 Dixie Rd., Toronto (Mississauga) Ontario (Dixie Rd. & Dundas St. E. area)
- High Park (Towers store 22) 2290 Dundas St. W., Toronto, Ontario (Dundas St. W. & Bloor St. W. area)
- Jane & Finch Mall (Towers store 38), 3929 Jane St., Toronto (North York) Ontario (Jane St. & Finch Ave. W. area)
- Kipling & The Queensway (Towers store 53) 1255 The Queensway, Toronto (Etobicoke) Ontario (Kipling Ave. & The Queensway area)
- Midland Lawrence Plaza (Towers store 21) 2650 Lawrence Ave. E., Toronto (Scarborough) Ontario (Lawrence Ave. E. & Midland Ave. area)
- Rexdale Mall (Towers store 43) 2267 Islington Ave., Toronto, (Etobicoke) Ontario (Islington Ave., & Rexdale Blvd. area)
- Riverdale Plaza (Towers store 30) 449 Carlaw Ave, Toronto, Ontario (Carlaw Ave. & Gerrard St. E. area)
- The Galleria Mall (Towers store 47) 1245 Dupont St., Toronto, Ontario (Dufferin St. & Dupont St. area)
- Westside Mall (Towers store 34) 2400 Eglinton Ave. W., Toronto (York) Ontario (Eglinton Ave. W. & Keele St. area)
- Westwood Mall (Towers store 60) 7205 Goreway Dr., Mississauga (Malton) Ontario (Goreway Dr. & Morning Star Dr. area)

=== Prince Edward Island and Nova Scotia ===
- Charlottetown (Charlottetown Mall) Paired With an IGA grocery store, converted to Zellers and later Target in 2013. Since closure of Target store has been converted into several retailers.
- Summerside (Waterfront Mall) Converted to Zellers and paired with an IGA.
- Bedford (Bedford Place Mall) This store was transferred to The Bay as Zellers had a location in Sunnyside Mall located across from Bedford Place. The Bay closed this location January 1996. Store was converted to Zellers in the summer of 1996 having relocated from Sunnyside Mall. The store was converted to Target in 2013 and later subdivided into Fit for less and Giant Tiger.
- Dartmouth - Cole Harbour (Colby Village Plaza) Opened in 1986. Converted to Zellers in 1991. The store converted to Walmart in 2012 as part of 39 Zellers leases sold by Target to Walmart Canada.
- New Minas (Gardens Mall) Converted to Zellers in 1991. The store was also paired with an IGA grocery store. With the takeover of Towers; Zellers continued operating the two locations during the 1990s. Due to Zellers having a larger location nearby at County Fair Mall and IGA closing due to the takeover of the Oshawa Group by Sobeys, Gardens Mall was closed and demolished in early 2000s. The site was redeveloped into open air plaza anchored by Walmart.
- Bridgewater (Bridgewater Mall)

=== New Brunswick ===
- Saint John

=== Quebec ===
- Châteauguay (St-Jean Baptiste Blvd.)
- Greenfield Park (Taschereau Blvd.)
- Laval (Centre 2000 Mall)
- Laval (Centre Duvernay Shopping Centre)
- Longueuil (Place Désormeaux Mall)
- Montreal (Décarie Square Mall)
- Québec City (Mail Centre-Ville)
- Sorel (Promenades de Sorel Mall)
- Ste-Foy (Place Laurier Mall)
- St-Jean-sur-Richelieu (Place Saint-Jean Shopping Centre)
- Saint-Léonard (7600 Viau Blvd.)

== See also ==
- List of Canadian department stores
