= Sherwood Co-op =

Canadian retail cooperative operation

Sherwood Co-operative Association Limited
- Type: Cooperative
- Industry: Groceries; Petroleum; Household hardware
- Headquarters: Regina, Saskatchewan
- Total assets: $136 Million CDN
- Number of employees: 650
- Website: www.sherwoodco-op.crs

Sherwood Co-operative Association Limited (commonly referred to as Sherwood Co-op) is a retail cooperative operating in Regina, Saskatchewan, Canada.

== Present Operations ==
Sherwood Co-op is a locally-owned and operated retail co-operative that was incorporated on April 8, 1931. Sherwood Co-op has over 67,000 Member/owners, over 650 employees, assets of in excess of $136 million and annual sales over $230 million. Sherwood Co-op supports over 500 charities and non-profit organizations annually.

With three Food Centres, a Home and Building Centre, ten Gas Bar/Convenience Store/Car Washes, and one stand alone Pharmacy, Sherwood Co-op has become one of the largest retail businesses in the City of Regina. In addition, Sherwood Co-op operates branch locations in Emerald Park, Indian Head, Southey, Dysart and Montmartre.

Sherwood Co-op operates as a locally based cooperative that engages with the community and provides lifetime membership benefits.

Sherwood Co-op is a member of Federated Co-operatives.

== See also ==
- List of Co-operative Federations
- List of Canadian supermarkets
