= Commisso's Food Markets =

Canadian supermarket chain

The original Commisso's food markets logo

Commisso's Food Markets was a Canadian supermarket chain based in Beamsville, Ontario. Operating under Commisso's Grocery Distributors Limited, the chain was part of one of the largest independently owned grocery and food distribution chains in Southern Ontario. At its peak, Commisso's operated a wholesale business and distribution centre, six cash and carry outlets, and 16 supermarkets across the Niagara and Hamilton areas, where its commitment to "quality products, friendly people and low prices" proved very popular.

On December 3, 2003, Sobeys announced that it had entered into an agreement to purchase all of the company's assets and a deal was finalized on February 3, 2004. All of the original Commisso's supermarkets were converted to Sobeys and Price Chopper stores. The original Beamsville location, which the Commisso family kept in operation for two more years, was purchased by Loblaw Companies. It closed on January 31, 2007, and re-opened in May as a No Frills supermarket.

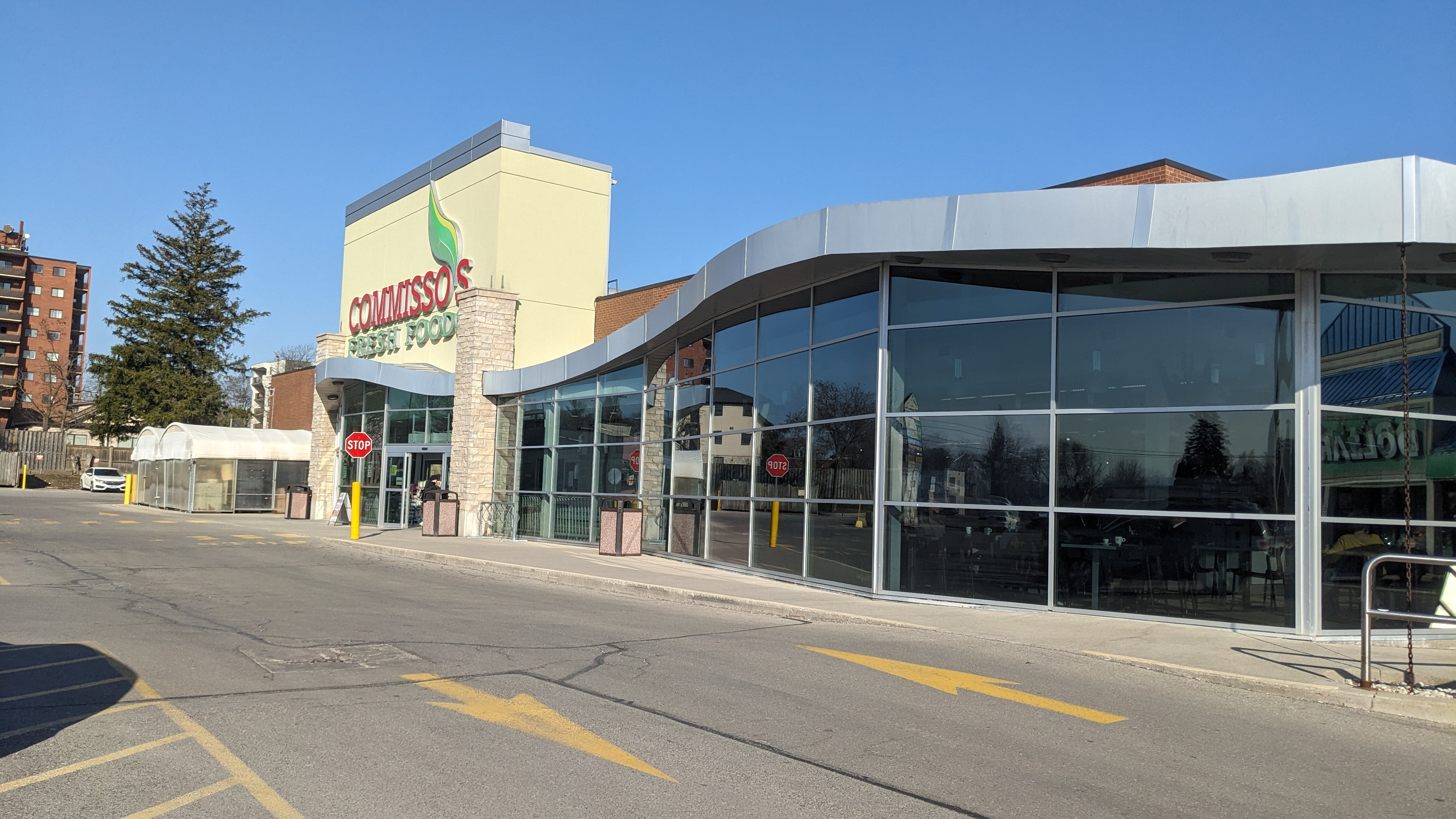
Commisso's Fresh Foods in Niagara Falls

As of 2009, the Commisso family opened a new store called Commisso's Fresh Foods located in Niagara Falls, Ontario on Thorold Stone Road.

== History ==
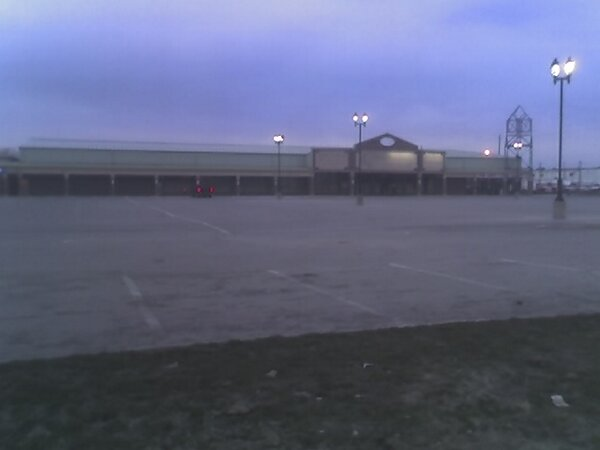
Former Commisso's #9 in East Hamilton. This location closed and moved two blocks south to reopen as a Sobeys

In 1962, Mike Commisso, a local foundry worker, opened a 20 by 80-foot (24 m) family grocery store in Beamsville, Ontario. Upon his retirement, the business was handed over to his three sons who expanded the company over a period of several years.

A second location was opened at 106 Broadway, Welland, ON L3C 5L5 Welland, Ontario in 1967. In 1977, the Welland store was re-located to the Rose City Plaza on Ontario Road in Welland, a new 42,000-square-foot (3,900 m^{2}) building, operating under the name Food Terminal. The low-priced products and high quality service of the store, which operated in a warehouse-like setting, made the store popular for families in the area. Food Terminal soon operated in several communities throughout the Niagara region, including three stores in St. Catharines.

In the 1990s, Food Terminal adopted a new look and name, inspired by the original Beamsville store's "Town Square" design. All Food Terminal stores were converted to the Commisso's Food Markets format, which included new investments in state-of-the-art technology and further expansion into Hamilton and the Greater Toronto Area.

In 2000, Commisso's bought Lanzarotta Wholesale Grocers Limited (LWG) - a private family-owned Ontario company. At the time, LWG was one of Canada's largest, most successful independent wholesale grocers, at distribution rates of nearly 10,000 products to 7,000 retailers a week. The purchase of LWG brought Commisso's several key advantages including additional purchasing power, stronger merchandising performance, greater warehouse capacity and management, and the introduction of the Our Very Own line of discount products.

== See also ==
- List of supermarket chains in Canada
