= Marché Adonis =

Canadian supermarket chain

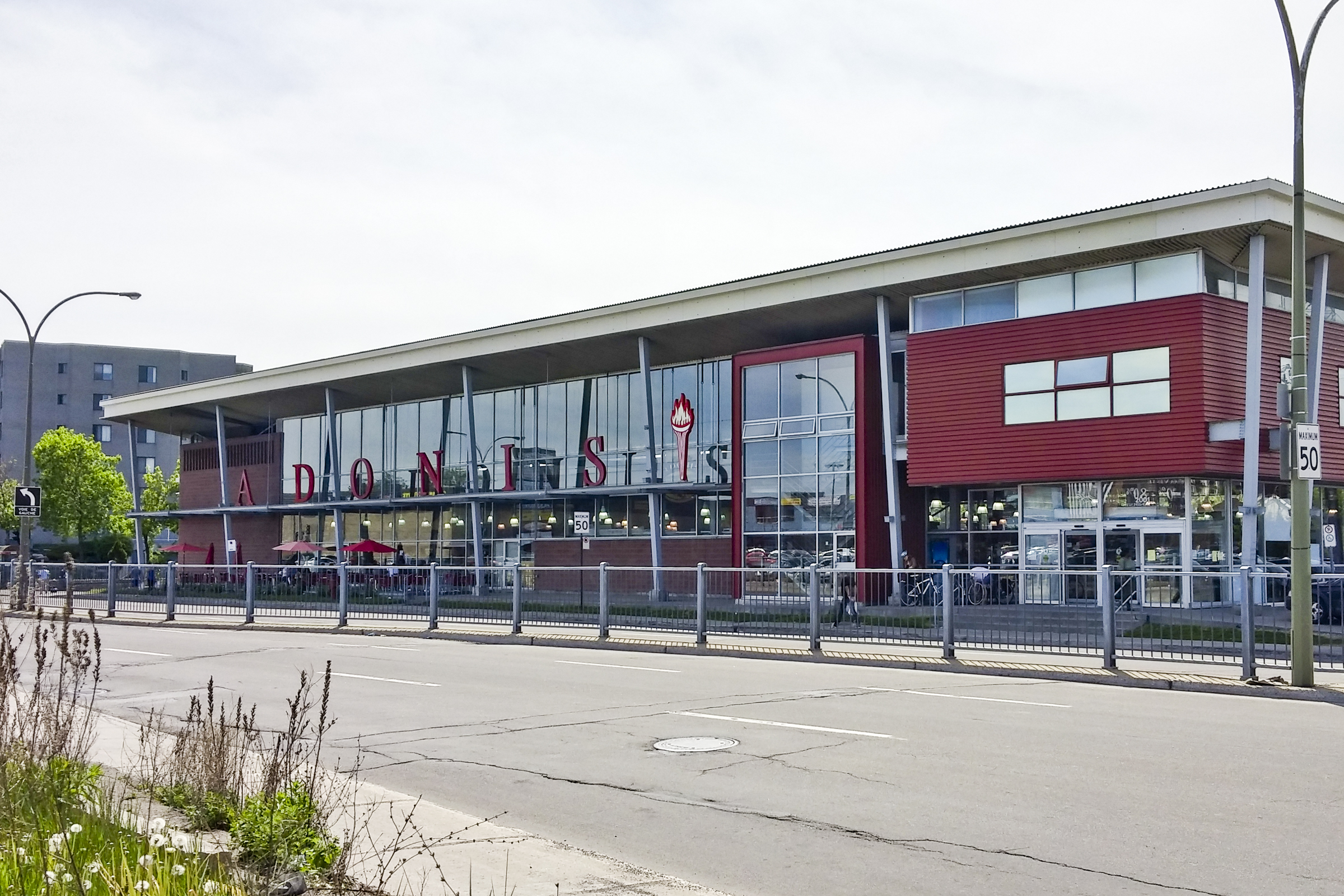
- Adonis supermarket in Montreal
- Type: Subsidiary
- Industry: Supermarket
- Founded: 1979; 47 years ago
- Headquarters: Montreal, Quebec, Canada
- Area served: Ontario, Quebec
- Products: Bakery, beer, charcuterie, dairy, deli, frozen foods, general grocery, liquor, meat & poultry, nuts, pastries, produce, seafood, snacks, wine
- Owner: Metro Inc. (55.5%)
- Website: groupeadonis.ca

Marché Adonis is a supermarket chain operating in the Canadian provinces of Quebec and Ontario. The company is based in Montreal, Quebec. In 2011, Metro Inc. acquired a majority stake (55.5%) (CAD$153.8 million) in Marché Adonis.

== History ==
Adonis was founded in 1979 by Lebanese brothers Elie and Jamil Cheaib, and their friend Georges Ghorayeb, who provided the funding. Inspired by their roots in Lebanon, and the idea of bringing their culture to a new world, the Cheaib brothers and their friend Georges Ghorayeb developed the idea of trading typical food of the Middle East in North America. In 1979, they opened their small 1,000 sq ft (93 m^{2}) store on Faillon Street, at the corner of Lajeunesse Street, in Montreal.

=== Expansion ===
By 1984, Montreal's Arabic-speaking and Mediterranean communities had become larger, and Adonis expanded by opening a new store on l'Acadie Boulevard.

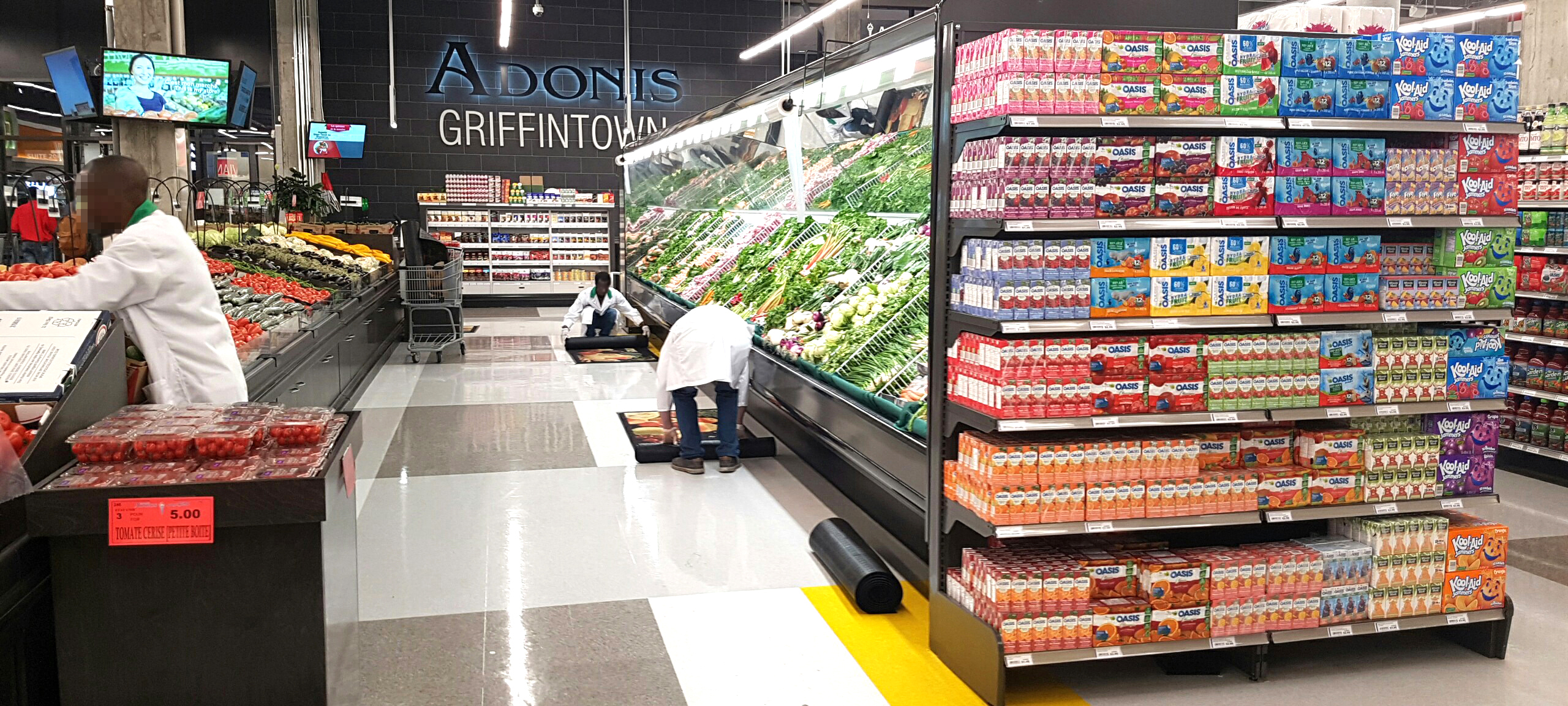
Opening of an Adonis supermarket in the Griffintown area of Montreal in 2016

Then two much bigger stores were launched in 2003, one on Sauvé Street (replacing the store on l'Acadie Boulevard) and another in Montreal's West Island on des Sources Boulevard in Roxboro. These were followed by further stores at Place Vertu in Ville Saint-Laurent, on Saint Catherine Street in Downtown Montreal, on Peel Street in Griffintown and Boulevard des Roseraies in Anjou in East Montreal.

Marché Adonis also expanded to Laval in the North Shore with two branches on Boulevard Curé-Labelle, Laval and avenue des Aristocrates in East Laval and also to the South Shore with a store on Boulevard Leduc in Brossard. A branch was opened in the Gatineau region, replacing the Target in that city.

On October 26, 2011, Elie Cheaib, Jamil Cheaib and Georges Ghrayeb signed an agreement with Metro Inc. which acquired a majority stake of 55%. Metro acquired the remaining 45% in 2017.

In 2013, Adonis opened their first store in Ontario, Canada, located in Mississauga, followed by another one in Scarborough. A second Mississauga location as well as a new location in Ottawa opened in 2019.

== See also ==
- Metro Inc.
- List of supermarkets in Canada
