= Farm Boy =

Canadian specialty grocery store chain owned by Empire Company Limited

Farm Boy Inc.
- Industry: Grocery
- Founded: 1981; 45 years ago
- Founder: Jean-Louis and Collette Bellemare
- Headquarters: 1427 Ogilvie Road, Ottawa, Ontario, Canada
- Number of locations: 53
- Area served: Ontario
- Number of employees: 2,700+
- Parent: Empire Company (2018–present)
- Website: www.farmboy.ca

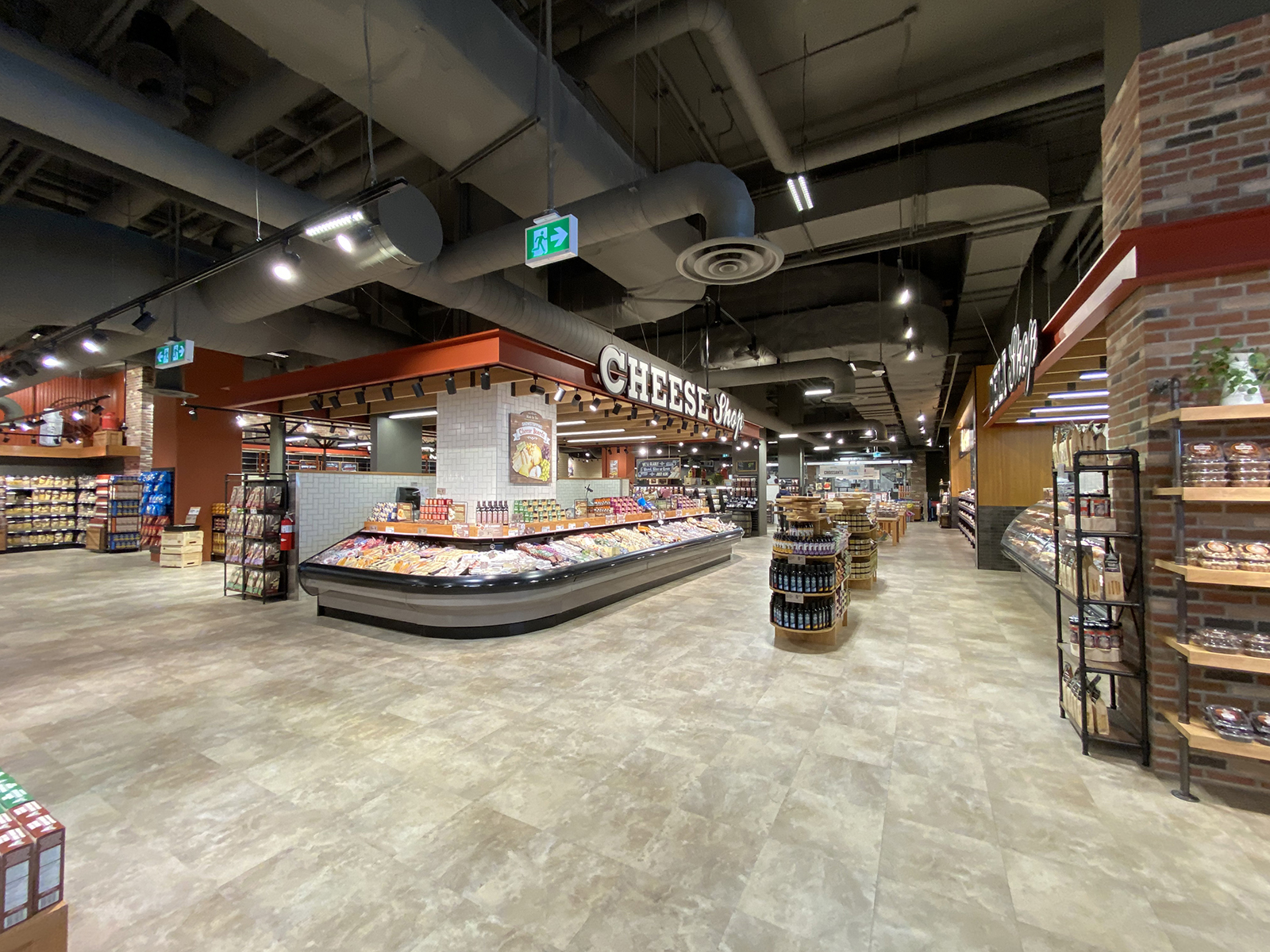
Farm Boy Queen's Quay location

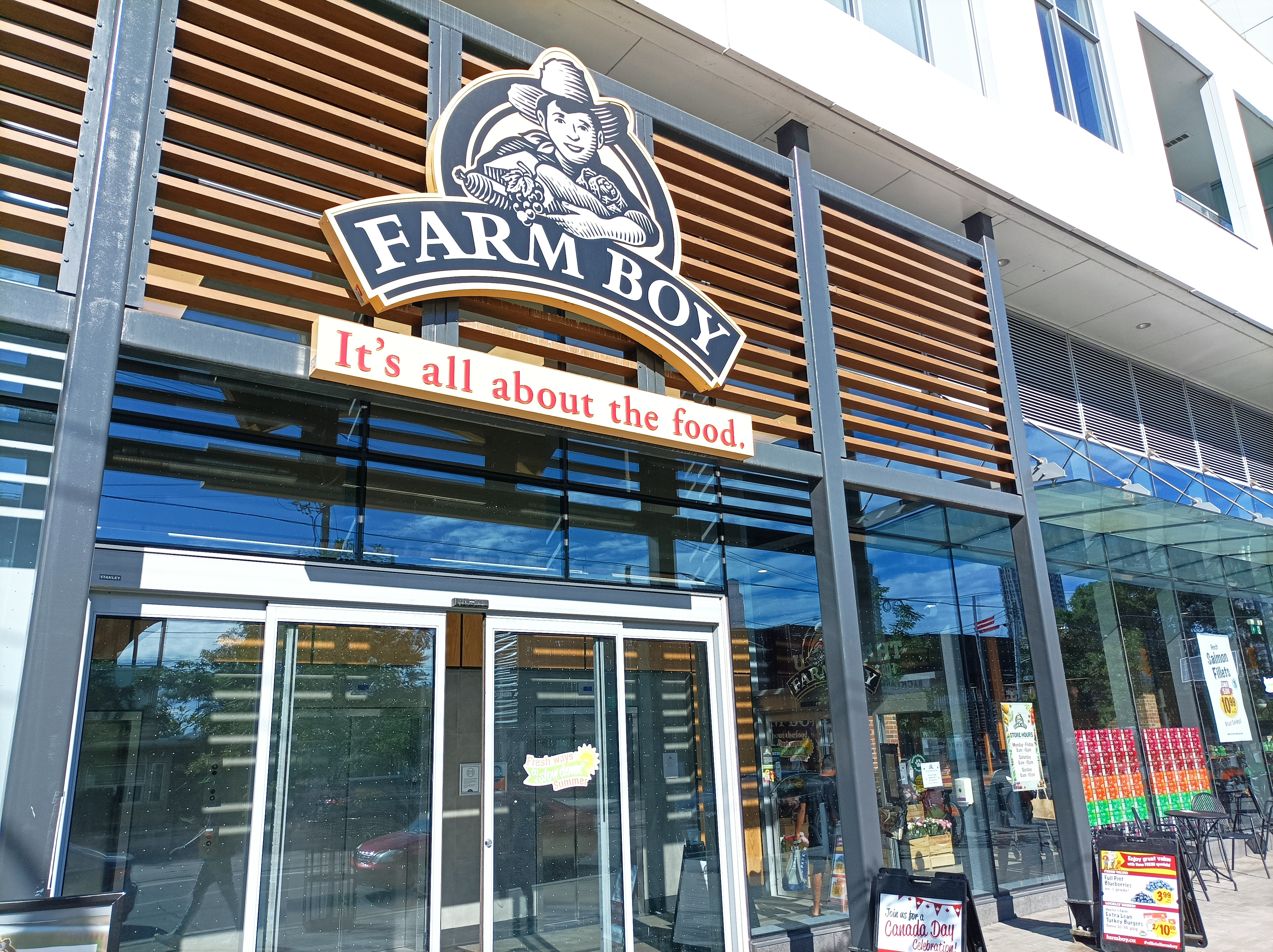
Farm Boy Bathurst Street location

Farm Boy Inc. is a Canadian specialty food retailer operating in the province of Ontario. The company is based in Ottawa, Ontario. Since 2018, the company is majority owned by the Sobeys grocery chain's parent company, Empire Company Ltd.

The retailer markets itself as selling fresh produce and food products, emphasizing their branding on farm-to-table. Its current slogan can be found under the Farm Boy sign on its stores, "It's All About The Food." The stores are smaller than large supermarket chain locations and are usually located on major streets with room for large parking lots for automobile access. However, they are also conveniently located in malls and urban areas with little parking that caters to downtown pedestrians. The company has its own private label, Farm Boy, on its packaged food.

== History ==
On December 2, 1981, Collette and Jean-Louis Bellemare opened the first Farm Boy on Cumberland Street in Cornwall, Ontario. At that time, the modest 300 sq. ft. store sold only produce. The original store was moved in 1984 by Jean-Louis and his brother Normand Bellemare. The move to their 5,000 sq. ft. (460 m^{2}) Sydney Street location allowed them to expand their products beyond produce with dairy, deli, cheese, and meat product lines. An in-store bakery and bulk food were later added.

=== Expansion ===
By 1992, the business had expanded into Ottawa. By 2007, Farm Boy operated eight additional stores in Ottawa, beginning on Centrum Boulevard in Orleans. Store openings included Nepean on Merivale Road (1996), Hillside Plaza on Montreal Road (1997), Kanata (1997), Blossom Park (2003), and a second Orleans location (2004). The Ottawa expansion continued with new stores in Barrhaven (2006), Blue Heron Mall on Bank Street (2006), and the Kanata Signature Centre (2007). Ottawa continued gaining Farm Boy locations at Britannia Plaza (2011), Stittsville (2011), Place d'Orleans (2012), which was the first store to offer an in-store eating area.

In the fall of 2003, the Bellemares created a board of directors to oversee the company's overall direction and appointed Jeff York as the new President of Farm Boy in 2009. In 2012, Normand and Daniel Bellemare stepped down as the Boston-based investment group Berkshire Partners invested in the company.

Farm Boy expanded to Kingston, Ontario in 2012 and London, Ontario in 2014. Citing success in its first London location at Wellington Road just north of Bradley Ave, the company announced two more locations would open in the spring of 2015. The first is located near CF Masonville Place in the city's north end, and the region's largest store is located at Wonderland and Beaverbrook, just west of Western University. The Wonderland and Beaverbrook location also has the company's regional offices. In the summer of 2015, Farm Boy furthered its expansion with its first location in Kitchener and Whitby. In the summer of 2016, another store was opened in the Westboro neighbourhood of Ottawa. This store was meant as an experiment for the company to have a more central location with a greater focus on in-store dining with a larger eating area and "Farm Boy Kitchen" prepared food area. In July 2017, it was announced that Farm Boy would be taking over part of the former food court location at CF Rideau Centre in downtown Ottawa, which opened mid-December 2017. On March 1, 2018, Farm Boy opened their first store in Toronto, in the district of Etobicoke at Alderwood Plaza. On March 22, 2018, the company opened their 26th location in Hamilton at Harvard Square Plaza.

=== Acquisition by Empire Company Limited ===
On September 24, 2018, Empire Company Limited, parent of the Sobeys chain of supermarkets, announced that it had signed an agreement to purchase Farm Boy from Berkshire Partners and Farm Boy's management shareholders in a deal worth CA$800 million. Regulatory approval was required for the purchase.

Farm Boy founder Jean-Louis Bellemare, his co-CEO Jeff York, and other members of the senior executives were planned to stay on and reinvest to own a 12% share in the new company, which would operate as a separate entity. The new ownership would account for Farm Boy to expand into south-western Ontario, and in particular the Toronto region.

Farm Boy products were planned for inclusion in the Ocado-based Empire e-commerce business, Sobeys, in 2020, but as a separate entity from other Empire chains.

=== Further expansion ===
By September 2018, the chain had 26 stores and annual sales of CA$500 million. The Financial Post summarized the store's appeal as, "It’s known for its fresh products, pre-made food, smaller stores and private label products". The company announced that its focus for future expansion will be on both urban and suburban locations around Ontario.

== Stores ==
As of August 2026, there are 53 Farm Boy locations.

== Animatronic figures ==
Farm Boy has a selection of animatronic figures within their stores. These include Mikey, a monkey who swings above the banana display in the produce section. Another animatronic figure is the Farm Boy with his dog, Barn Door Buddy. These figures were inspired by the animatronics located at the Stew Leonard's chain of stores.

== See also ==
- List of Canadian supermarkets
