= Loeb (supermarket) =

Canadian supermarket chain

- Company type: Division
- Industry: Supermarket
- Founded: Ottawa, Ontario, Canada, 1912
- Defunct: 2009
- Headquarters: Ontario, Canada
- Products: Dairy, frozen foods, grocery, general merchandise (non-food), meat/deli, pharmacy, produce, snacks
- Parent: Metro Inc.
- Website: www.loeb.ca (redirects to metro.ca)

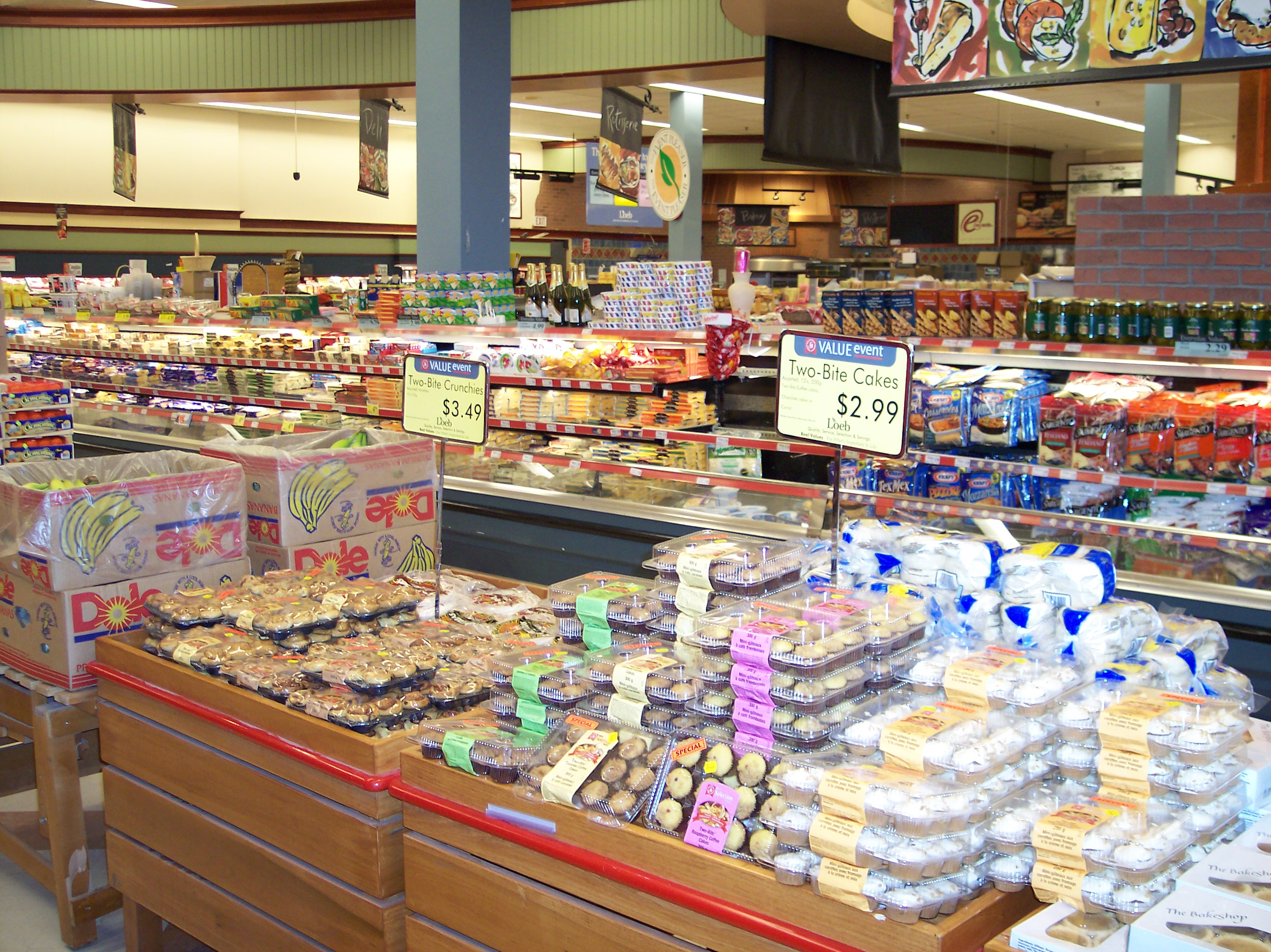
Interior of a typical Loeb supermarket

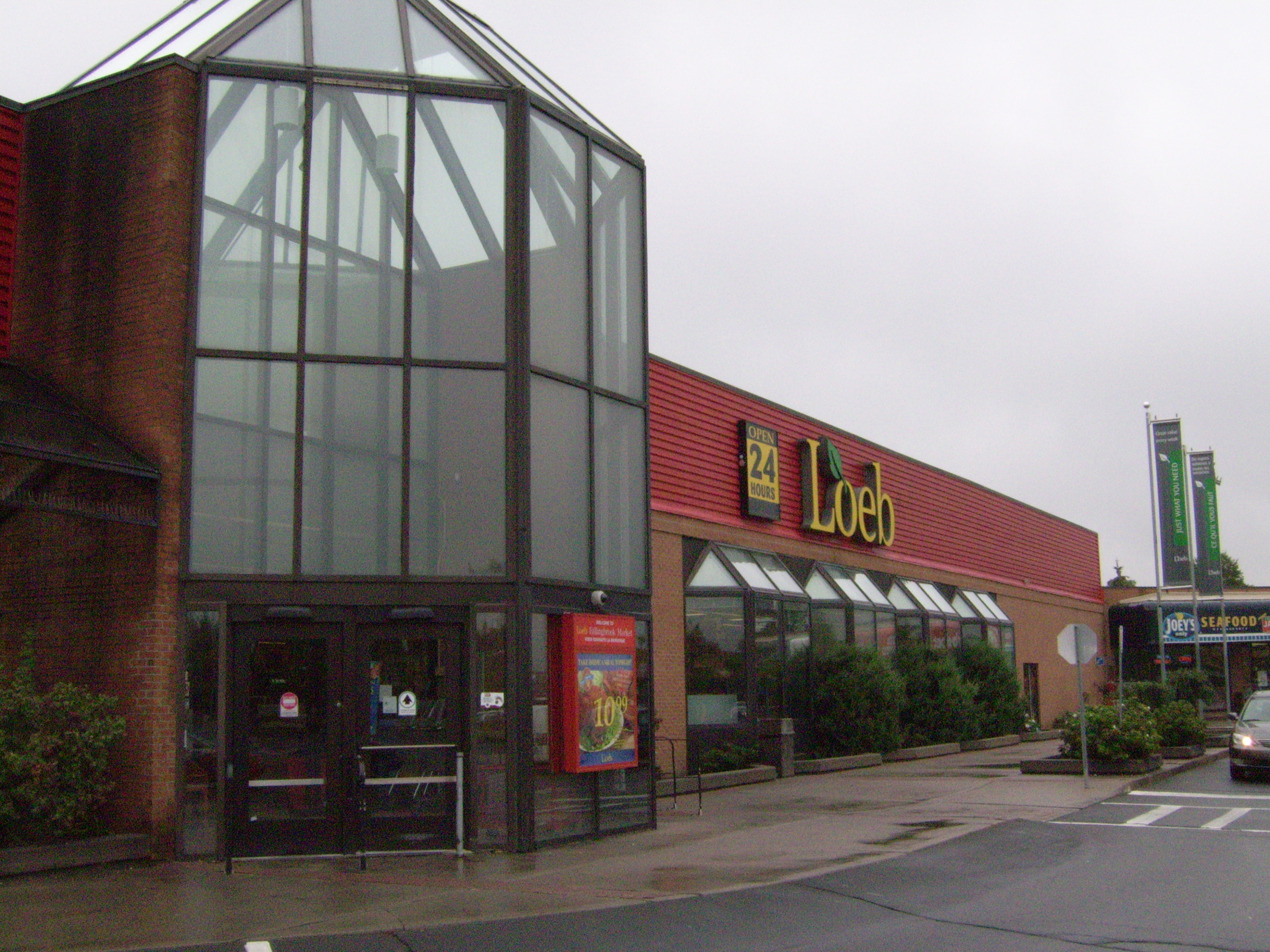
Loeb Fallingbrook on Tenth Line Road in Orléans, Ontario

Loeb was a Canadian supermarket chain. Founded in Ottawa, Ontario, Loeb expanded across Canada, and into parts of the United States. The company was acquired by the Quebec-based supermarket chain Metro in 1999, and its stores were converted to the Metro brand in 2008.

== History ==
Loeb began in 1912 when Moses Loeb opened a small wholesale confectionery house in Ottawa. By 1950, Loeb grew into two large warehouses, and the following two decades were those of lucrative business ventures. Through partnerships with other companies into the 1980s, Loeb continued to serve the needs of people throughout Canada and the United States.

In 1990, Loeb launched its own brand of private label products, called 'Loeb Made Today', followed by 'Loeb Ready' products.

In the early 1990s, Loeb had mascot characters named "Koo-Kie" and "Handy and Dandy".

=== Acquisition by Metro ===
In 1998, Loeb parent company Provigo was acquired by Loblaw Companies. Loblaw was required to resell Loeb for competitive reasons. In 1999, Metro-Richelieu bought 41 Loeb stores and the rights to the Loeb name. Loblaw kept the remaining 51 locations, which were rebranded to other banners. Following the purchase, Metro began putting products from its own house brands, Merit/Selection and Irresistibles, on the shelves of Loeb stores.

In 2006, following Metro's acquisition of The Great Atlantic & Pacific Company of Canada, Loeb became a subsidiary of A&P Canada. New products and services were introduced to Loeb stores, and the Merit, Econochoix, and Irresistible lines were dropped in favour of A&P Canada's own Master Choice, Equality and Baker's Oven products, along with Fresh Obsessions produce.

On August 7, 2008, Metro announced it would invest $200 million consolidating the company's conventional food stores under the Metro banner. Over a period of 15 months, all Loeb stores were converted to the Metro name. The rebranding also saw the Irresistibles and Selection brands return to the stores, replacing those inherited from A&P.

=== Advertising slogans ===
- 1998–2002: Real Values (Get Real... Real Saving, Real Quality, Real Variety & Real Freshness)
- 2002–2004: For What's Important in Life
- 2004–2009: Just What You Need, Lunch Box Treats for Kids of All Ages!, Cut Your Way Everyday!, Freshness to Go!

== Private labels ==
- Selection
- Econochoice
- Irresistibles
- Loeb Bakery Shoppe
- The Event Pleaser
- Red Grill Meats

Former brands (2006 to 2008):

- Fresh Obsessions
- Master Choice
- Basics for Less
- Equality

== See also ==
- List of Canadian supermarkets
