= Federated Co-operatives =

Canadian co-operative federation

Federated Co-operatives Limited
- Type: Cooperative federation
- Industry: Distribution; Petroleum; Lumber
- Founded: 1944; 82 years ago
- Headquarters: Saskatoon, Saskatchewan
- Key people: Heather Ryan, CEO (2022)
- Revenue: ▼CA$11.695 billion (2025)
- Net income: ▲CA$0.462 billion (2025)
- Total assets: ▼CA$9.452 billion (2025)
- Total equity: ▲CA$6.825 billion (2025)
- Number of employees: 27,500 (2025)
- Website: www.fcl.crs

Federated Co-operatives Limited (FCL), operating as Co-op, is a co-operative federation providing procurement and distribution to member co-operatives in Western Canada. It was established in 1944 after a series of amalgamations of smaller cooperatives, starting in Saskatchewan, including the Saskatchewan Co-operative Wholesale Society and a fuel production and distribution co-op, the Consumers' Co-operative Refinery Limited (CCRL). Federated had expanded to Manitoba, Alberta, and British Columbia by 1970, and later to a small number of locations in Northwestern Ontario and the Northwest Territories. Federated Co-operatives is owned by about 160 member co-operatives across the region. Some are large co-operatives, such as Saskatoon Co-op, while others are small co-ops based in small towns or villages, such as Abernethy Co-op.

In 2009, FCL was ranked as the largest co-operative in Canada by total sales. In 2010, FCL was the second largest company by annual sales in Saskatchewan. During that year, it earned revenues of $498 million and returned $355.7 million to its member retailers. In 2008, Federated Co-operatives saw sales increase and posted its 37th record year in a row for both sales and profits.

== History ==
The contemporary FCL is the result of several ongoing co-operative amalgamations. In 1944, the Consumers' Co-operative Refineries Limited (based in Regina and founded in 1934 to build what has since grown into the Co-op Refinery Complex)) and the Saskatchewan Co-Op Wholesale merged to form the Saskatchewan Federated Co-operatives Limited.

FCL purchased Downie Street Sawmills of Revelstoke, British Columbia in 1969. The forest products operation replaced a Smith, Alberta, business FCL sold in 1977.

The United Co-operatives of Ontario were purchased by Growmark in 1994, since operating as FS.

In March 2010, Federated Co-operatives announced an agreement with SeaChoice, a program of Sustainable Seafood Canada devoted to sustainable seafood. Through collaboration, the organizations seek to develop a long term sustainability strategy for seafood sales and procurement in the co-operatives' member businesses.

Federated Co-operatives was awarded the SABEX Environmental & Sustainability award from the Greater Saskatoon Chamber of Commerce in May 2010.

In November 2012, FCL sold its Forest Products Division operations in Canoe, British Columbia to Gorman Bros. Lumber. In August 2013, FCL acquired 17 agri-business locations across Saskatchewan, Alberta, and one in Manitoba, from Viterra, which was in the process of selling its Canadian agriculture business to Agrium. They were transferred to local FCL affiliates, excluding two that were retained by FCL and closed. In February 2014, FCL acquired 14 grocery store locations from Sobeys; the divestment was to comply with requirements imposed by the Competition Bureau in the wake of its 2013 acquisition of Safeway. These stores, which were mainly former Safeway locations, were transferred to local affiliates and re-branded as Co-op stores in May 2014. The acquisition notably marked the first time since 1983 that Red River Co-op had operated grocery stores in its footprint.

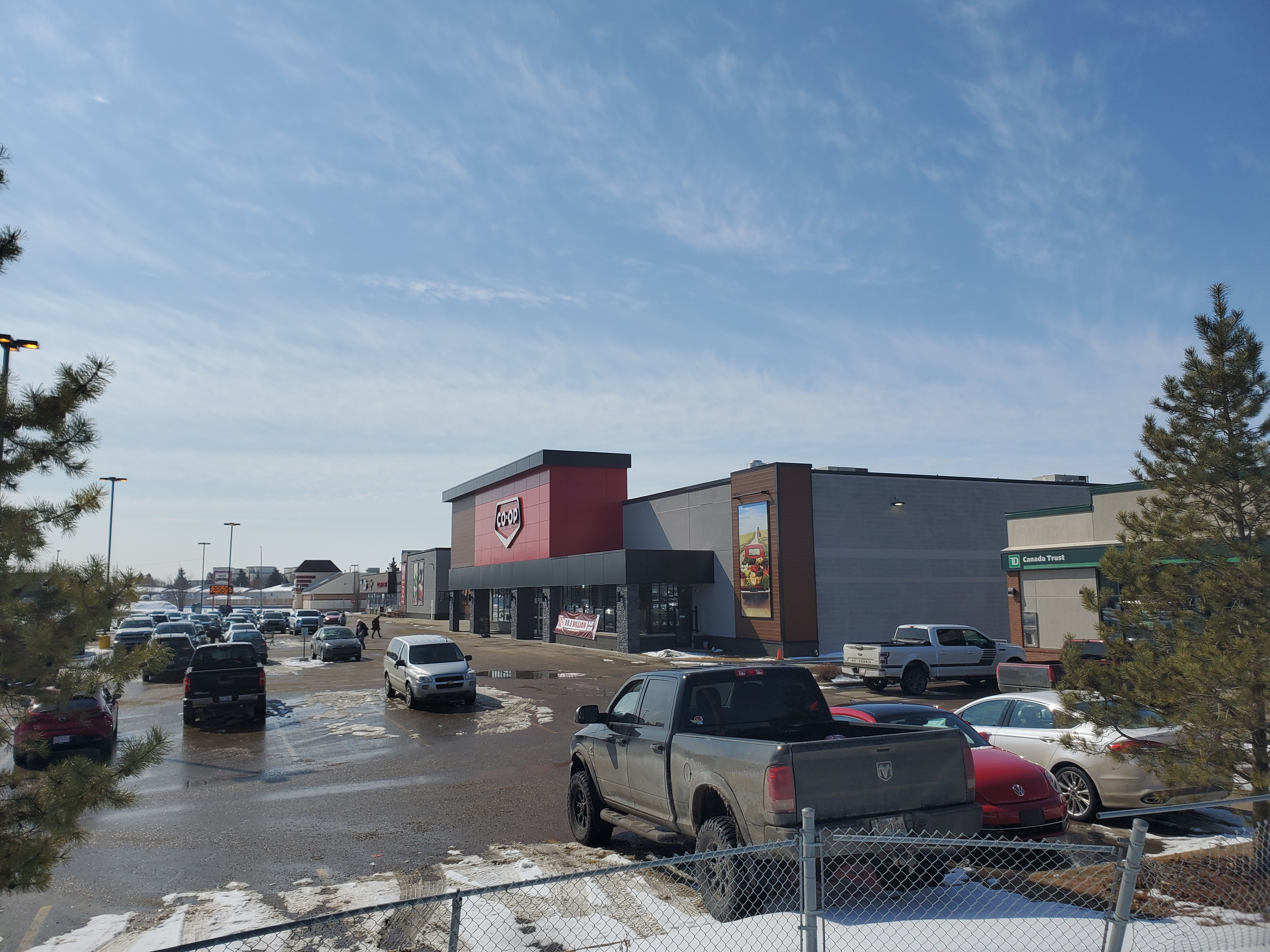
A newer-styled Co-op grocery store in Fort Saskatchewan (2020)

In August 2019, FCL member Calgary Co-op announced that Overwaitea Food Group would supply the products for its grocery stores beginning April 2020. FCL executives criticized the move for their decision to be supplied by a privately owned competitor, and having a potential impact on the group's overall business (including its Calgary distribution centre). In response to the agreement, FCL closed its distribution centre in Calgary, and introduced a "loyalty program" of quarterly rebates on wholesale petroleum purchases by its members, provided that the member acquires at least 90% of their overall stock via FCL. The organization considered the program to be a safety measure for its members in case of further withdrawals from its system. Calgary Co-op filed a lawsuit alleging that the loyalty program constituted oppressive conduct. In December 2023, FCL was ordered to pay compensation to Calgary Co-op for fuel purchases between November 2019 and January 2023.

In December 2019, Unifor called for a national boycott of all FCL operations due to a then-ongoing lockout and hiring of scabs to replace workers at Co-op's Regina refinery.

In November 2021, FCL reached an agreement to acquire 181 Husky-branded retail locations for $264 million—FCL's largest acquisition to-date. They are located in Western Canada, and will be transferred to FCL affiliates or independent franchisees (under the Tempo banner). The sale was part of the divestment of Husky's retail operations by new owner Cenovus Energy, with the remainder being sold to Parkland Corporation.

In late-June 2024, FCL shut down some of its internal systems as a precaution after reporting that it had been the victim of an cyberattack. Customer data was not believed to have been compromised, but the attack impacted the operations of Co-op retail locations, including grocery inventory shortages, and cardlock outages.

== Services ==
Key services fall into the following categories:

- Product distribution from warehouse facilities in Calgary, Edmonton, Saskatoon, Regina, and Winnipeg.
- Six animal feed plants in Western Canada (Ag Business)
- 20 propane distribution centers
- Co-op Refinery Complex (Oil refinery based in Regina, Saskatchewan)
- The Grocery People (TGP) is based in Edmonton, Alberta, and serves independent grocery stores in western Canada

== Store brands ==
Federated Co-operatives markets several store brands at its affiliated retailers, including Co-op Gold, Co-op Gold Pure, Co-op Market Town, Co-op Centsibles (discount-oriented), Co-op Care+ (pharmacy), Co-operative Coffee, and Lucky Dragon (Asian food line).

Its petroleum division franchises the service station brands Tempo, and Western Nations (which is franchised to operators within First Nations communities).

== Notable Members ==
- Otter Co-op
- Red River Co-op
- Saskatoon Co-op
- Sherwood Co-op
