= FreshCo =

Canadian discount supermarket chain owned by Sobeys

FreshCo Ltd.
- Type: Subsidiary
- Industry: Retail
- Predecessor: Price Chopper; Commisso's Food Markets/Food Terminal (Ontario and eastern provinces) Safeway; Sobeys (Western Canada)
- Founded: 2010; 16 years ago
- Headquarters: Mississauga, Ontario; Stellarton, Nova Scotia
- Products: Bakery, dairy, deli, frozen foods, general grocery, general merchandise, meat & poultry, produce, seafood, snacks
- Parent: Sobeys

FreshCo Ltd. is a Canadian chain of discount supermarkets owned by Sobeys. It was launched in March 2010. As of September 2024, there were over 125 FreshCo stores.

In December 2017, Sobeys Inc. announced plans to re-brand up to 64 stores in western Canada currently under the Safeway and Sobeys names into the FreshCo banner.

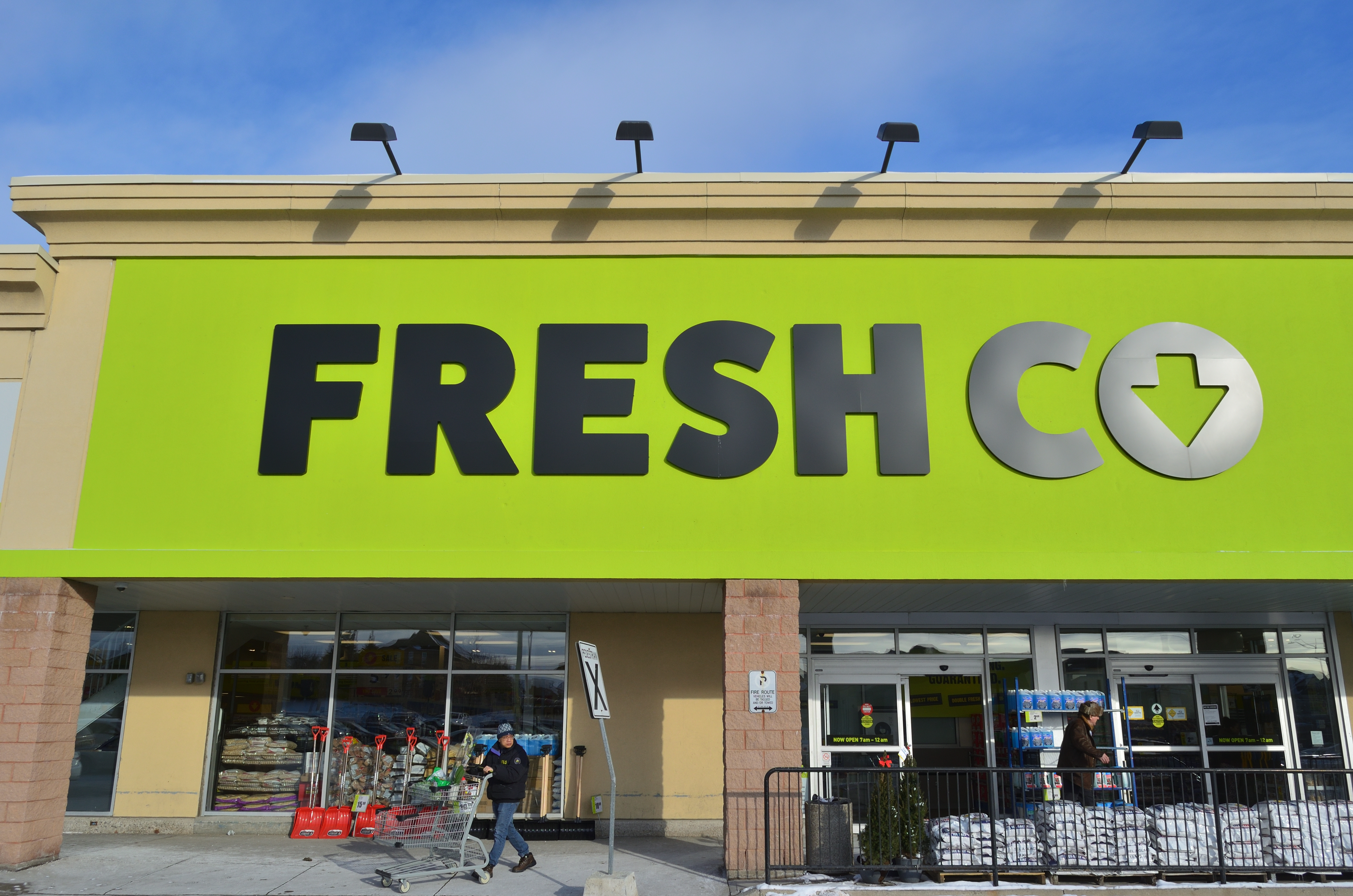
Freshco in Richmond Hill, Ontario

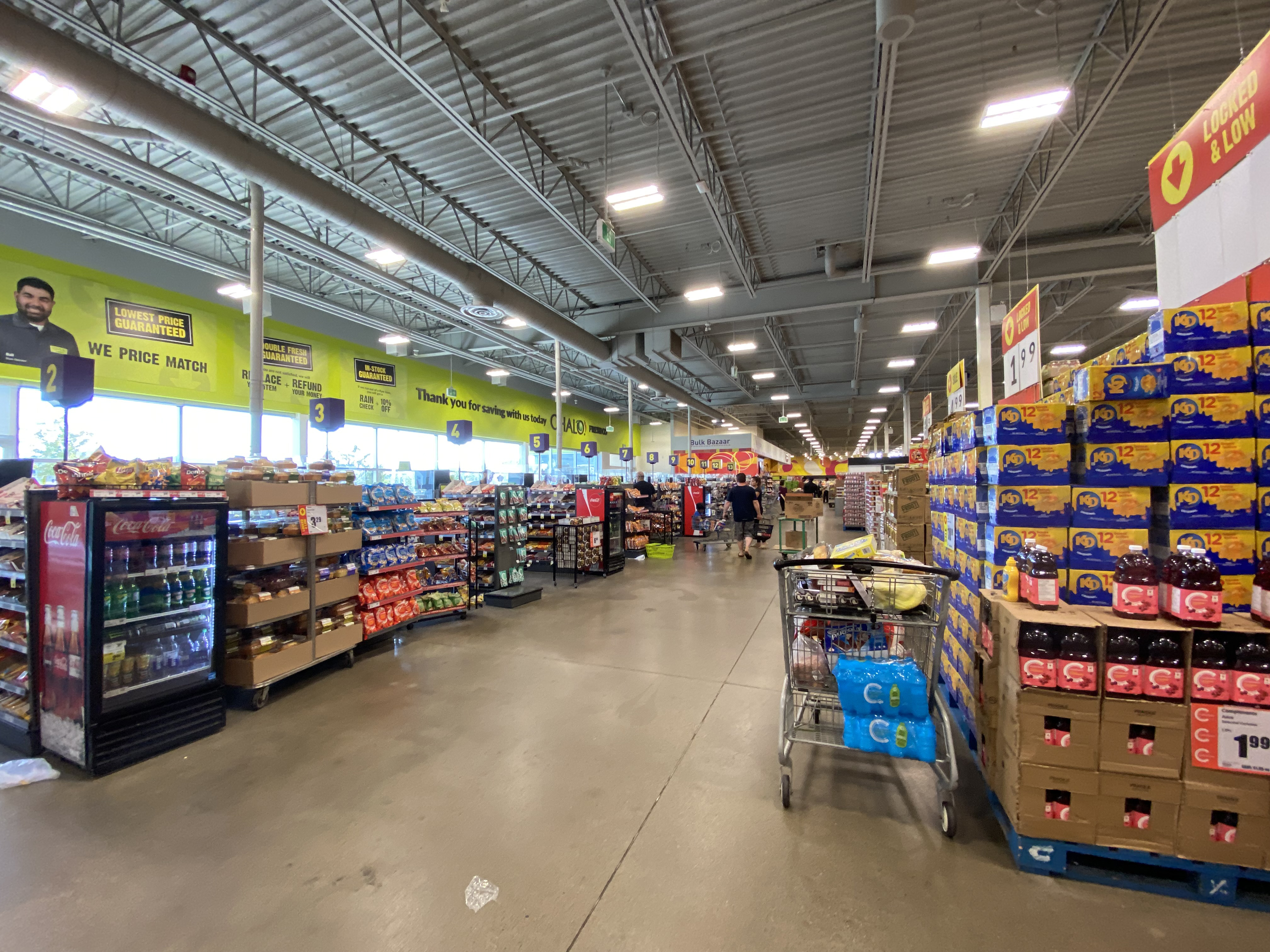
Freshco interior

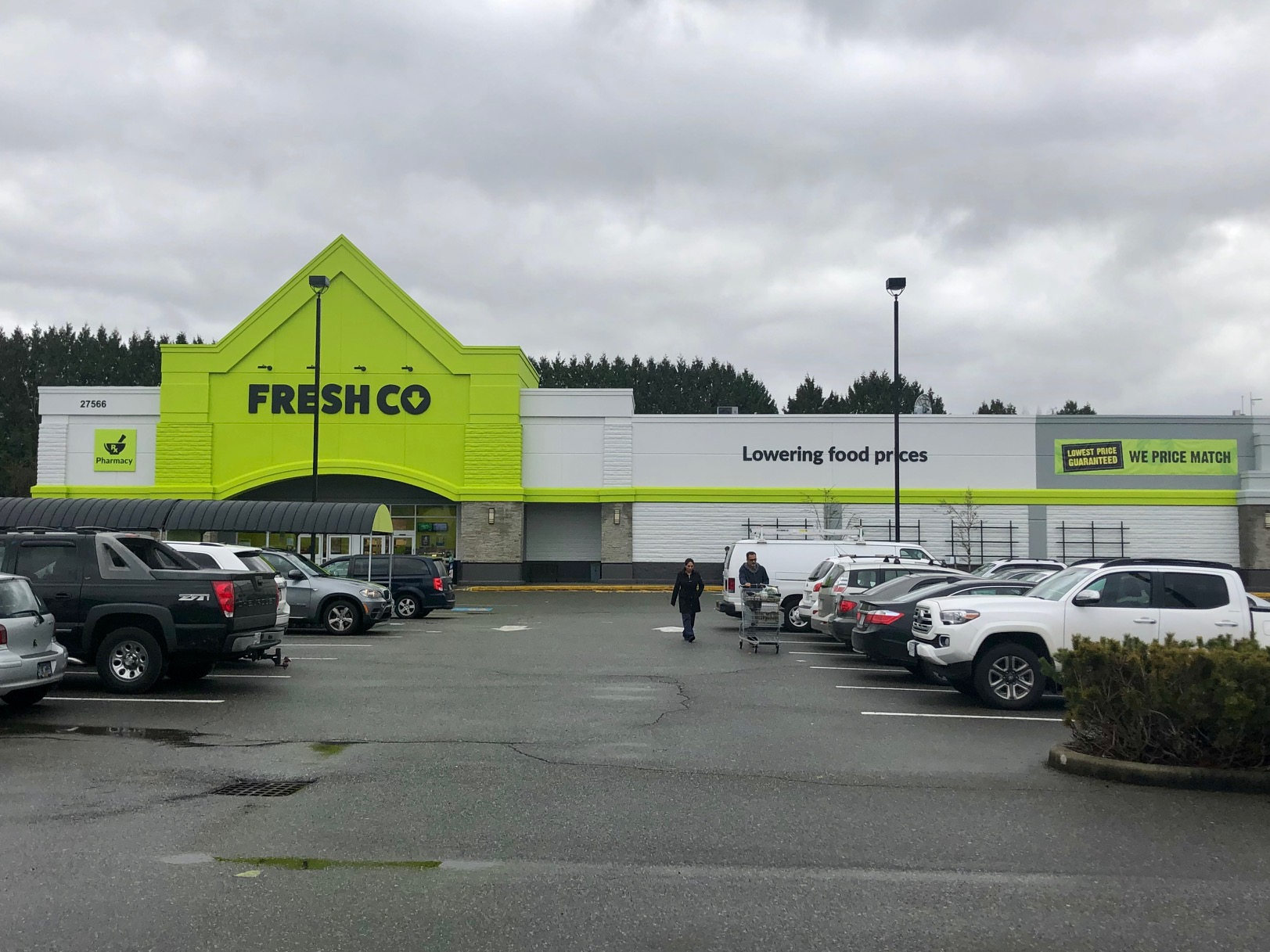
A FreshCo store in Aldergrove, British Columbia, with the "Lowering Food Prices" slogan

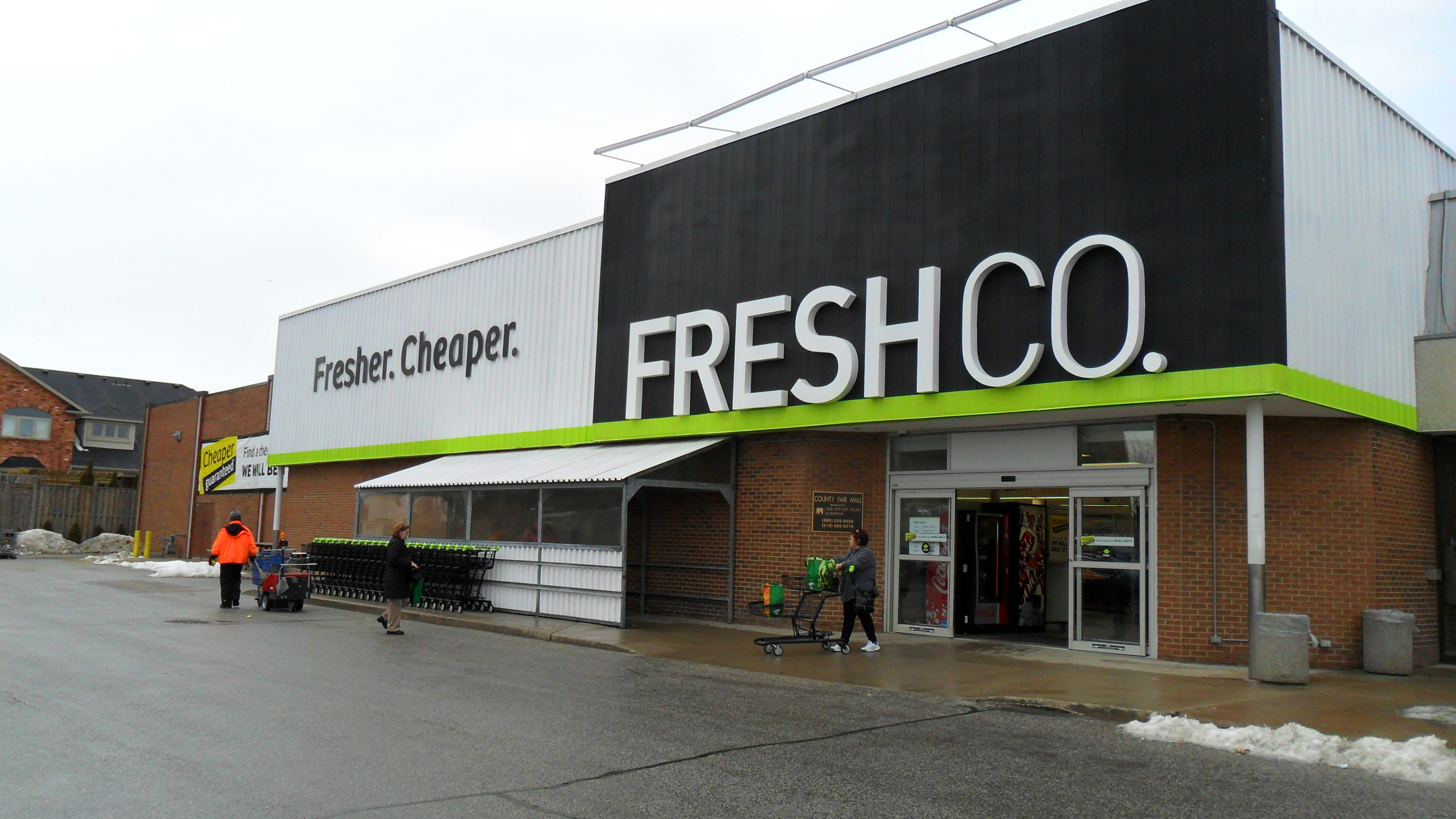
A FreshCo location in Guelph, Ontario, with the old branding and "Fresher, Cheaper" slogan.

Until summer 2019, FreshCo used the slogan, "Fresher, Cheaper."

== Price Chopper ==
Price Chopper had operated in Ontario in the 1990s under the ownership of Oshawa Group. Oshawa Group, including the Price Chopper chain, was acquired by Sobeys in 1998 as part of the latter's entry into the Ontario market. The 87 Price Chopper stores were scattered around many neighbourhoods in Ontario, particularly low-income communities.

By the late 2000s, Price Chopper was facing increased competition from Loblaw Companies, which was opening more No Frills discount grocery stores in Eastern Canada.

According to an analyst from CIBC World Markets, Price Chopper had been regarded as an unprofitable also-ran for decades, under both Oshawa Group and Sobeys, with no lasting improvements from repeated turnaround efforts. The chain's few private-label offerings hurt its gross margins. Price Chopper was not contributing much to parent Sobeys' bottom line and lagged far behind Loblaw's No Frills and Metro's (formerly A&P Canada's) Food Basics in discount supermarket share, which was particularly significant in the Ontario market where discount grocers held 35 to 40 percent of the food shopping market. Overall, Sobeys was struggling in Ontario, having only made 25% of its profits there despite that province containing 40% of its retail real estate, due to an outdated supply chain and unfavourable locations.

Sobeys closed some Price Chopper stores in the Atlantic provinces or converted them to its Foodland banner.

Sobeys hired Rob Adams, who was previously with Loblaw Companies managing its No Frills discount grocery division, to run its discount grocer chain. Adams came up with the idea for FreshCo to carry higher quality goods to differentiate them from other discount supermarkets.

According to parent company Sobeys, FreshCo is considered to be a new brand and not just a replacement for Price Chopper. However, most FreshCo stores were renovated and converted from existing Price Chopper locations, with only a handful of FreshCo stores that were newly built or converted from other retailers, essentially making FreshCo the de facto successor to Price Chopper. The first eight FreshCo stores were launched on May 12, 2010, in Brampton and Mississauga, Ontario. By April 2012, FreshCo expanded to 68 stores in Ontario.

Reportedly, customer reception to FreshCo has been positive, and Sobeys has enjoyed the highest same-store increase in sales among major Canadian supermarket chains over the past few years.

== Chalo FreshCo ==
Sobeys opened its first South Asian–focused FreshCo store in August 2015 in Brampton. Branded as Chalo FreshCo (chalo meaning "let's go" in Indo Aryan languages like Urdu, Punjabi, Hindi, Marathi, Gujarati, and Bengali), it is billed as the first grocery store in Canada for "desis". It is designed to attract South Asian shoppers by providing a wider variety of South Asian products under one roof. The store's success inspired the opening of three more Brampton locations in September 2016, March 2019, and March 2021, as well as the conversion of the newly renovated FreshCo at Westwood Square Mall in Mississauga to the banner in December 2017. The Chalo brand expanded outside of Ontario for the first time in 2019 with the founding of two supermarkets in Surrey, British Columbia, in the city's Newton and Strawberry Hill neighbourhoods, in July. Another Chalo! FreshCo location was opened in February 2020 in Abbotsford, BC. Additional locations had opened up in 2021 in the Tamarack neighbourhood of Edmonton, Alberta and in the Saddle Ridge neighbourhood of Calgary, Alberta, with a third location opening up in Calgary's Cornerstone neighbourhood. This brings the total number of Chalo locations to 11 - five in Ontario, three in BC, and three in Alberta.

== See also ==
- List of supermarket chains in Canada
