= Rockland Centre =

- Centre Rockland
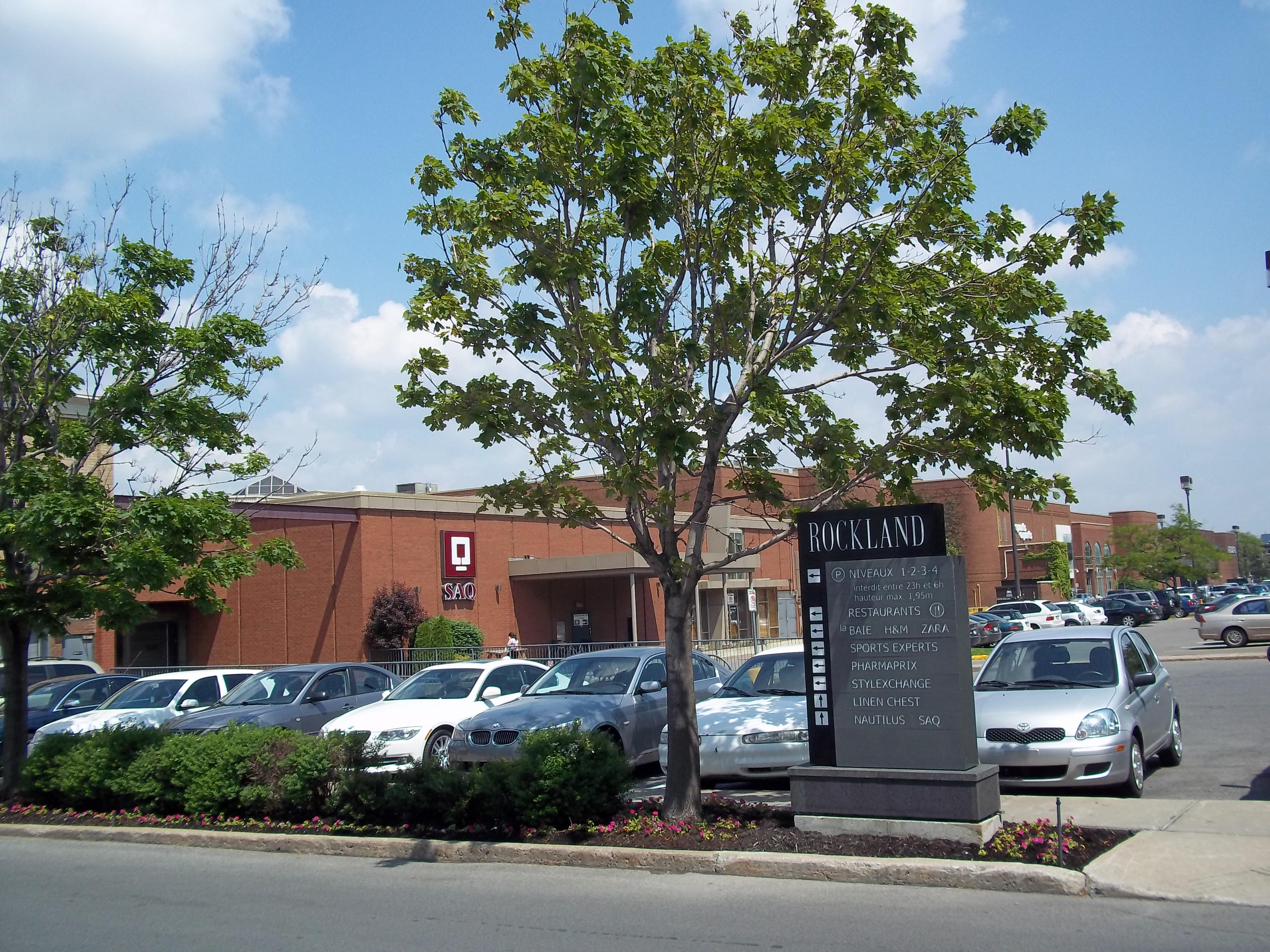
- Rockland Centre from the southern parking
- Location: Mount Royal, Quebec, Canada
- Coordinates: 45°31′41.3″N 73°38′53.0″W
- Address: 2305, chemin Rockland
- Opened: August 1959
- Manager: Cominar
- Owner: Cominar
- Architect: Victor Prus
- Num. of stores: 170
- Num. of anchor tenants: 10
- Floor area: 647,000 sq ft (60,100 m^{2}) (GLA)
- Floors: 3
- Parking: Indoor & Outdoor
- Public transit: Acadie; Crémazie; STM: 100, 119, 179, 365, 460
- Website: centrerockland.com

Rockland Centre (French: Centre Rockland) is an upscale shopping mall located in the town of Mount Royal, Quebec, Canada. The mall is situated at the intersections of the Metropolitan Boulevard, Chemin Rockland and Acadie Boulevard, adjacent to the Park Extension neighbourhood of Montreal.

== Modern tenants ==
Rockland Centre is home to H&M, Vero Moda, Jack & Jones, Rudsak, Massimo Dutti, Michael Kors, Stuart Weitzman, Zara and Guess.

Hudson's Bay was by far the largest contemporary tenant at Rockland Centre until its 2025 closing, but there are smaller anchor stores including IGA Extra, Pharmaprix and Sports Experts/Atmosphere.

== Current structure ==
Rockland Centre has three floors. But only the second and third floors are shopping space.

The first floor has only three tenants: Sports Experts, Nautilus Plus fitness club and Dollarama.

The second (main) floor features boutiques and the anchor IGA Extra.

The third (top) floor also consists of boutiques and the mall's food court.

== Historical ==
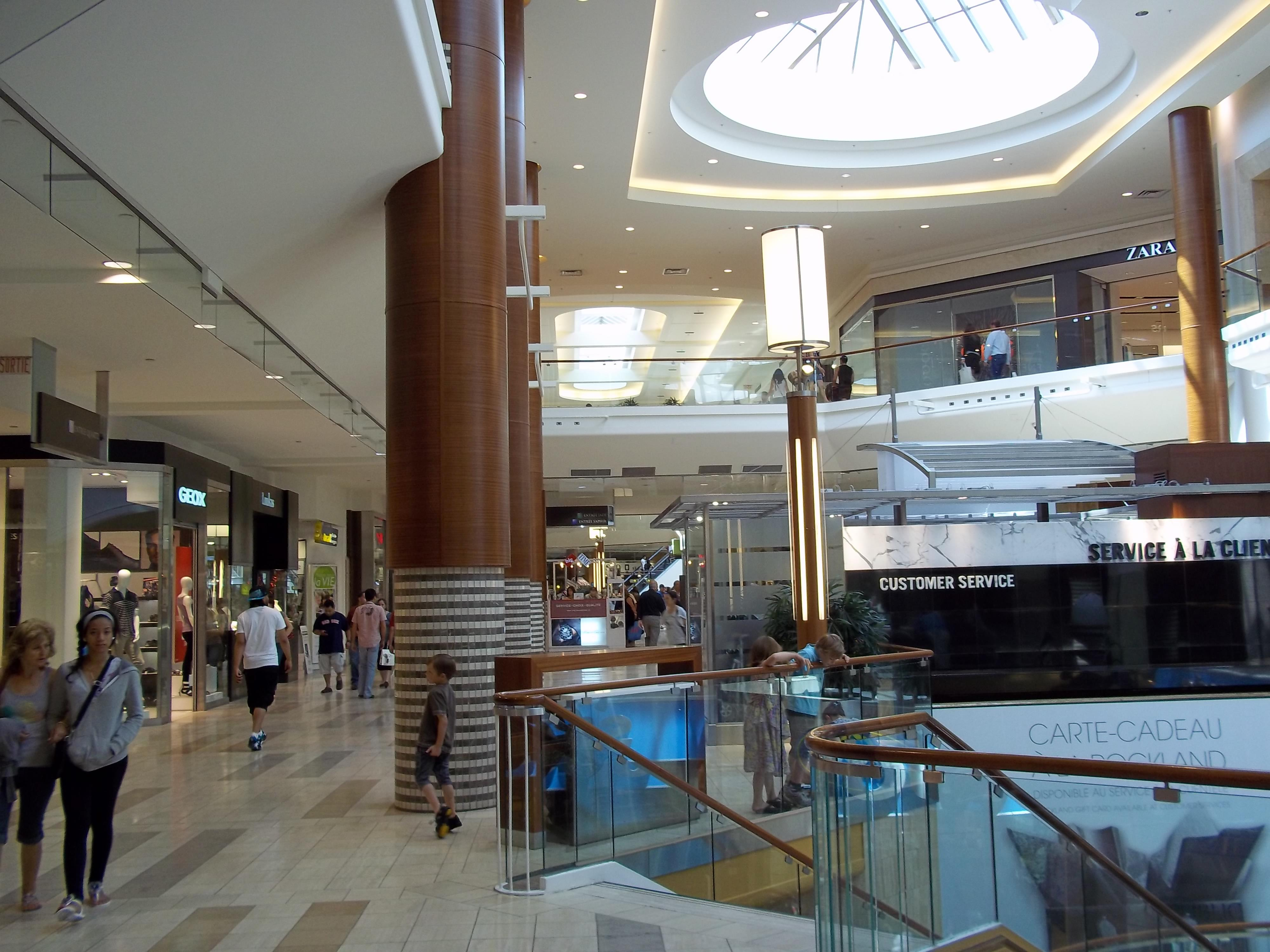
Mall interior in 2011

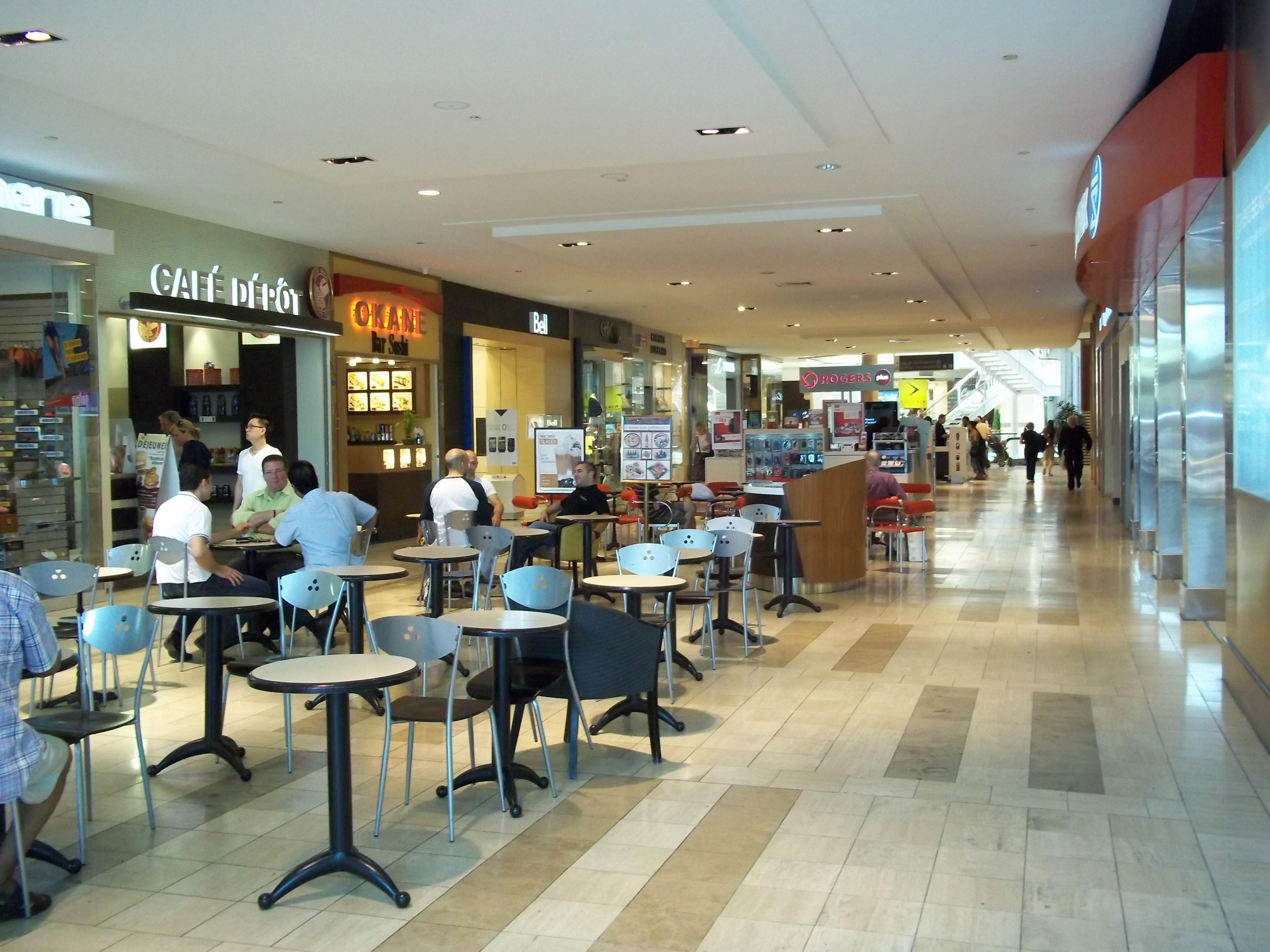
Access in 2011

=== Original shopping centre (1959-1982) ===
Rockland Centre first opened in 1959 with Steinberg's, Morgan's, Woolworth's, Holt Renfrew, United Cigars and 35-40 other tenants.

The original Rockland Centre was an outdoor shopping centre. It was a single-story shopping centre. Morgan's, however, had three floors. It was designed by architects Victor Prus and Ian Martin. It was the first shopping centre in the province to bring the "mall" concept, meaning a central corridor in the form of an open walkway surrounded by shops on each side.

Some of the tenants of the original centre included Reitmans, Laura Secord Chocolates, Browns Shoes and Bank of Montreal.

The Morgan's stores in Montreal were rebranded as The Bay in June 1972. The Bay at Rockland was at the time the largest of the retailer's locations in Montreal (excluding the downtown branch), and remained so even after the opening in August 1972 of the store at Centre Laval. (The Rockland store however had less of its total space dedicated to sales than the Laval location.)

=== Conversion into an upscale indoor mall (1982-1983) ===
By 1982, Rockland Centre was in steady decline due to the emergence of newer shopping malls. In particular, Rockland was considered a small shopping centre even by the standards of that time and it also lacked an enclosed mall. Compounded with the fact that it was located in the prosperous town of Mount Royal, the owners saw an opportunity to redevelop the centre.

Rockland Centre began in August 1982 a major renovation to transform itself into the upscale shopping mall it is today. Most of the original shopping centre was demolished. Only Steinberg's, The Bay and a handful of small tenants were spared from demolition. The Bay temporarily closed its store on January 15, 1983 for renovation with the intent of reopening in August 1983 with the new mall.

Rockland reopened on August 24, 1983 as a three level shopping centre with 175 stores anchored by The Bay, Eaton's, Steinberg's and Holt Renfrew. Except for Eaton's, these anchors were all part of the original shopping centre. Other returning businesses from the previous Rockland included Henry Birks and Sons, Bank of Montreal and National Trust Company. Unlike the original Rockland, this one was an enclosed mall. Rockland more than doubled its size at 700,000 sq ft (65,000 m^{2}). The Eaton's store was built in the place of the demolished shops from the old shopping centre, at 139,000 sq ft (12,900 m^{2}) and making a fifth of the size of the new mall. The Bay reopened in a new building of 153,000 sq ft (14,200 m^{2}), larger and adjacent to its former location, but with two floors instead of three. Unlike the majority of the old shopping centre, The Bay's original building was never demolished and was instead converted into mall space (with its first floor turned into a food court). Holt Renfrew inaugurated a new 25,000 sq ft (2,300 m^{2}) store; its largest at the time in a shopping mall. The Cumberland pharmacy doubled its size, while fitness chain Nautilus (known today as Nautilus Plus) opened its largest location at 14,000 sq ft (1,300 m^{2}). Linen Chest moved to the mall its original store that had been located since 1961 on Queen Mary Road in the Snowdon neighbourhood. A multi-level parking was built on the north side between The Bay and Eaton's during the transformation of the shopping centre.

The $65-million reconstruction of the mall was handled by a three-company developer group made of property manager Westcliff Developments along with Ivanhoe (the real estate arm of Steinberg's) and Ringold Enterprises, all three based in Montreal. Others investors in the project included Caisse de dépôt et placement du Québec and three other institutions. The Bay and Eaton's also invested heavily in the design of their respective stores.

In the late 2000s, Rockland Centre's older 80s signage was removed at the mall's exterior in favour of the current 1991 logo.

=== Demise of Steinberg's and afterwards (1992-present) ===
Steinberg's became a Metro in 1992.

Today the space is shared between Pharmaprix, a relocated Bank of Montreal and a vacant spot last occupied by a moved SAQ.

=== Demise of Eaton's and afterwards (1999-present) ===
Rockland's Eaton's was one of the remaining six stores (Note: Rockland Centre, Downtown, Fairview Pointe-Claire, Carrefour Laval, Promenades Saint-Bruno and Galeries d'Anjou) left in the Montreal area by the time of the retailer's collapse in 1999.

After 17 years on the same site in the basement, the existing Linen Chest store moved upstairs on December 5, 2001 into the former Eaton's location, almost doubling size from 15,000 sq ft (1,400 m^{2}) to 25,000 sq ft (2,300 m^{2}). The rest of the first floor of Eaton's eventually went to Laura. As of 2018, the size of the Linen Chest has been reduced to half of what it was following a revamp of the store, while Laura relocated elsewhere in the mall as a regular boutique. An IGA supermarket opened in those vacant spaces during Spring 2020.

The second floor of Eaton's was initially taken over by Sports Experts. In 2005, the Sports Experts store was moved to the vacant food court area on the first floor (The Bay's until 1983). In a swap of locations, the food court was moved to the second floor where Sports Experts had been (and which had been Eaton's second floor). 15 years later, the food court was closed for many months in 2018 to undergo a major renovation. A fresh new food court was launched in early 2019 as "La Cuisine".

Other contemporary tenants located within the former Eaton's building are Renaud-Bray bookstore and a relocated SAQ. The aforementioned second floor also used to have one of the H&M stores at Rockland but it moved next to Hudson's Bay within the same level and its previous location in the Eaton's building has remained vacant ever since.

=== Remnant of the original Rockland Centre ===
Although revitalised into mall space in 1983, the exterior of the old Morgan's/The Bay building can still been seen to this day from the multi-level parking lot.

=== Popular culture ===
The mall was the filming location in 1992 for the season 1 finale "Tale of the Pinball Wizard" from the children's horror/fantasy television show Are You Afraid of the Dark?.

== See also ==
- List of largest shopping malls in Canada
- List of malls in Montreal
- List of shopping malls in Canada
