= Frederick Cleveland Morgan =

Canadian curator (1881–1962)

- Born: 1 December 1881; Quebec, Canada
- Died: 3 October 1962 (aged 80); Senneville, Quebec, Canada
- Resting place: Cimetière Mont-Royal
- Known for: Department store heir; art collector; museum manager; philanthropist
- Spouse: Elizabeth (Bessie) Marcia Shaw (1883-1963) (m. 1906)
- Relatives: Henry Morgan (granduncle)

Frederick Cleveland Morgan D.C.L. LL. D (also known as F. C. Morgan, F. Cleveland Morgan and informally as Cleve Morgan) (1 December 1881 – 3 October 1962) was a Canadian department store heir, art collector, museum manager, and philanthropist.

== Career ==
F. Cleveland Morgan was the great nephew of Henry Morgan, founder of Morgan's Department stores, which were sold to the Hudson's Bay Company in the early sixties. At age 18, he entered Trinity College, Cambridge. He received an M.A. degree in zoology from McGill University in 1904 and then entered the family business Henry Morgan and Company till 1952 when he retired. There, as Vice-President, he was responsible for display, special events and the art and antique departments. Persistent eye problems (he had lost an eye in an accident when he was seven) led to his dedicating his life to building the decorative arts collection that defines the Montreal Museum of Fine Arts.

He was made the first curator of Decorative Arts at the Art Association of Montreal, now the Montreal Museum of Fine Arts and held the position from 1916 until his death in 1962. Under his direction, the collection amassed more than 70,000 works (around 150 every year). Among his acquisitions were the first Inuit artworks acquired by the Museum; he made these acquisitions in 1953.

Denys Sutton of the Apollo magazine believed Morgan was one of the most perceptive connoisseurs of his day in North America. Morgan's "outstanding judgement of quality and discernment" is reflected in the objects he gave (896 in his own name, 262 from his family), talked family and friends into purchasing and donating or purchased for the collection. His gifts constituted nearly his entire personal collection but there were many more that came to the collection through his astute knowledge of the art field and influence. These gifts are estimated at about a thousand.

Another area of interest for Morgan was the breeding of Siberian irises, in which he was a pioneer. He was a founding member of the American Iris Society. Some of his cultivars still persist in gardens around the globe.

In 1912, he built a country home in Senneville, Quebec, and called it Le Sabot. It was designed by David Shennan and today is considered an important monument of the Arts and Crafts movement in Canada and designated as a Historic Site of Canada. He also is responsible for the establishment of the Morgan Arboretum, given to McGill University in 1985. Frederick Cleveland Morgan died in Senneville on 3 October 1962. He is buried in the Cimetière Mont-Royal in Outremont, Quebec.

== Honours ==
- 1954 Doctor of Civil Law degree Bishop's University.
- 1960 Hon. Doctor of Laws McGill University.
- 1970 (posthumous) Award of Merit by the Royal Horticultural Society for creating the 'Mount Royal' iris.
- 2014 Designated a Person of National Historic Interest.

== Bibliography ==
- Morgan, David (1992). The Morgans of Montreal. D. Morgan. ISBN 0-9696676-0-4.
