= William Mellis Christie =

Scottish-Canadian businessman (1829–1900)

William Mellis Christie (5 January 1829 – 14 June 1900) is the namesake for the Canadian Mr. Christie brand of cookies and biscuits, owned by Mondelez International.

Christie was born in Huntly, Aberdeenshire, Scotland, the only child of John Christie and Jane Grant. He apprenticed as a baker before arriving in Canada in 1848.

== The Christie Bakery ==
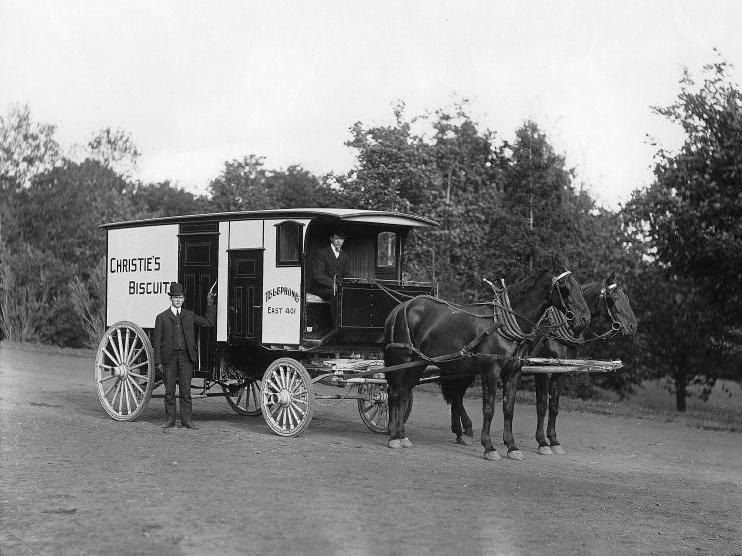
Christie's biscuit wagon, Montreal, 1904

With Alexander Brown, Christie co-founded a city bakery in Toronto, which became Christie, Brown and Company in 1853. By the 1880s, Christie's was considered to be the largest manufacturer of biscuits in Canada.

The firm's primary plant in Toronto covered 300,000 square feet (28,000 m^{2}). The business opened a $1 million biscuit factory in Winnipeg, Manitoba, a region where spring wheat (the type of wheat in bakery flour) is a major crop, in February 1932.

The product had a market base in all parts of the country but does not appear to have penetrated export markets to any degree before Christie's death. The product line, of which there were more than 400 varieties of cakes and biscuits, was carefully monitored for quality by Christie himself.

In October 1934, George Morrow and his brother Frederick K. Morrow owned the Christie, Brown Company, and had controlling interest in the Gold Dust Corporation, the American Linseed Company, the Standard Milling Company, the Ward Baking Company, United Cigar Stores Limited, and United Stores, Inc.

The no par common stock of the Christie, Brown Company was removed from the list on the New York Stock Exchange in March 1932.

Today Mr. Christie is a brand under Nabisco and as part of Mondelez International with products in the Canadian market. Mr. Christie Bakery and Outlet was located at 23 Park Lawn Road in Etobicoke before closing.

== Time line ==
1848 September – Age 19 – Christie gets his first job working as a baker in Toronto for a company called William McConnell. The shop is located on Yonge street at what was then the north end of Toronto. He is paid $4.00 per month plus given room and board. He does his baking at night and delivers the baked goods by handcart to customers in nearby Yorkville.

1850 – Age 21 – Christie leaves his job at William McConnell and goes to a neighbouring bakery managed by Alexander Mathers and Alexander Brown.

1853 – Age 24 – Christie and newfound partner George Maver take over the business from Alexander Mathers and Alexander Brown. Has some financial troubles the following two years, but by 1856 has got the business turning a profit.

1856 – Age 27 – Christie manages to buy out his partner, purchase the shop and hire three assistants.

1858 – Age 29 – Christie wins first prize at the Toronto exhibition for his biscuits.

1860 – Age 31 – Christie forms a partnership with his father-in-law, James McMullen, and focuses exclusively on biscuit making. With five staff he produces more than 4,300 boxes of biscuits by hand each year, bring total annual sales to $13,000.00.

1864 – Age 35 – Christie starts focusing on the wholesale trade.

1868 – Age 39 – The business enters a period of strong growth and he needs capital to expand. He seeks out his former employer Alexander Brown for help and the two become business partners in Christie, Brown and Company. Later that year they install steam powered machinery at their busy Yonge street shop.

1870 – Age 41 – The workforce has now doubled to 12 and sales have quadrupled.

1871 – Christie moves to offices on Francis Street (between Church Street and Jarvis Street and between King Street and Adelaide Street; now St. James Park).

1872 – Age 43 – Christie moves the factory to downtown Toronto and by 1874 the business consumes an entire city block (Duke and Frederick Streets, what is now Adelaide and Frederick Streets, currently the home of George Brown College).

1876 – Age 47 – Christie travels to the Centennial International Exhibition in Philadelphia and wins silver and bronze medals for his biscuits.

1878 February – Age 49 – Christie buys out Alexander Brown's share of the business and becomes the sole owner, but maintains the name Christie, Brown and Company.

1880 – Age 51 – Christie opens a sales office in Montreal. At this point the staff in Toronto number 120 and grow to 375 by the year 1900.

1890 – Age 61 – Christie, Brown and Company reaches a dominant position in Canada and now employs two out of three workers in the biscuit manufacturing industry

1899 – Age 70 – Christie, Brown and Company incorporated as a joint-stock company. He owned all 5,000 shares but this structure was, at least partly, designed with a view to dealing with his estate after death. Christie died of bone cancer the following year in Toronto.

1900 June 14 – Age 71 – Christie dies at his Queen's Park home (now Regis College) and the business, worth $500,000, passes on to his only living son, Robert Jaffray Christie. Christie is buried at Mount Pleasant Cemetery, Toronto.

1920 – Robert Jaffray, struck with cancer, sells the bakery to a group of New York investors. A non-compete clause is included which stipulated that no Christie would go into the baking business.

1926 – Robert Jaffray Christie dies

1928 – Nabisco acquires Christie, Brown and Company.

1949 – East York factory opens at 5 Bermondsey Road, later becomes Peek Frean's plant

1950 – Lakeshore factory opens at 10 Park Lawn Road

2012 November 1 – Lakeshore factory announces the closure of the plant in 2013

2013 – Lakeshore flagship factory demolished after Mondelēz shut it down

== Personal life ==
On March 21, 1855 at the age of 26 Christie married 25-year-old Mary Jane McMullen. In 1856 their first daughter, Mary Jane (Pollie) was born. (She subsequently married James Jackson Palmer in 1875.) Two years later, their second daughter, Anne Elizabeth was born. In 1860, their first son, James E. Christie was born and in 1864, Mary Jane delivered their third daughter, Fanny Laura Christie. In 1868, tragedy struck only eight months after the birth of Christie's second son, William "Willie" Christie, when an illness, disease or virus claimed the lives of 8-year-old James and 8-month-old Willie. Two years later, in 1870, the Christies had a third son: Robert Jaffray Christie, who would later inherit the company. Robert died in 1920, six years after he sold the Christie company.

== Bibliography ==
- "William Mellis Christie". The Canadian Encyclopedia.
- Biography at the Dictionary of Canadian Biography
