= Le Sabot =

Coordinates: 45°26′29.4″N 73°57′53.8″W

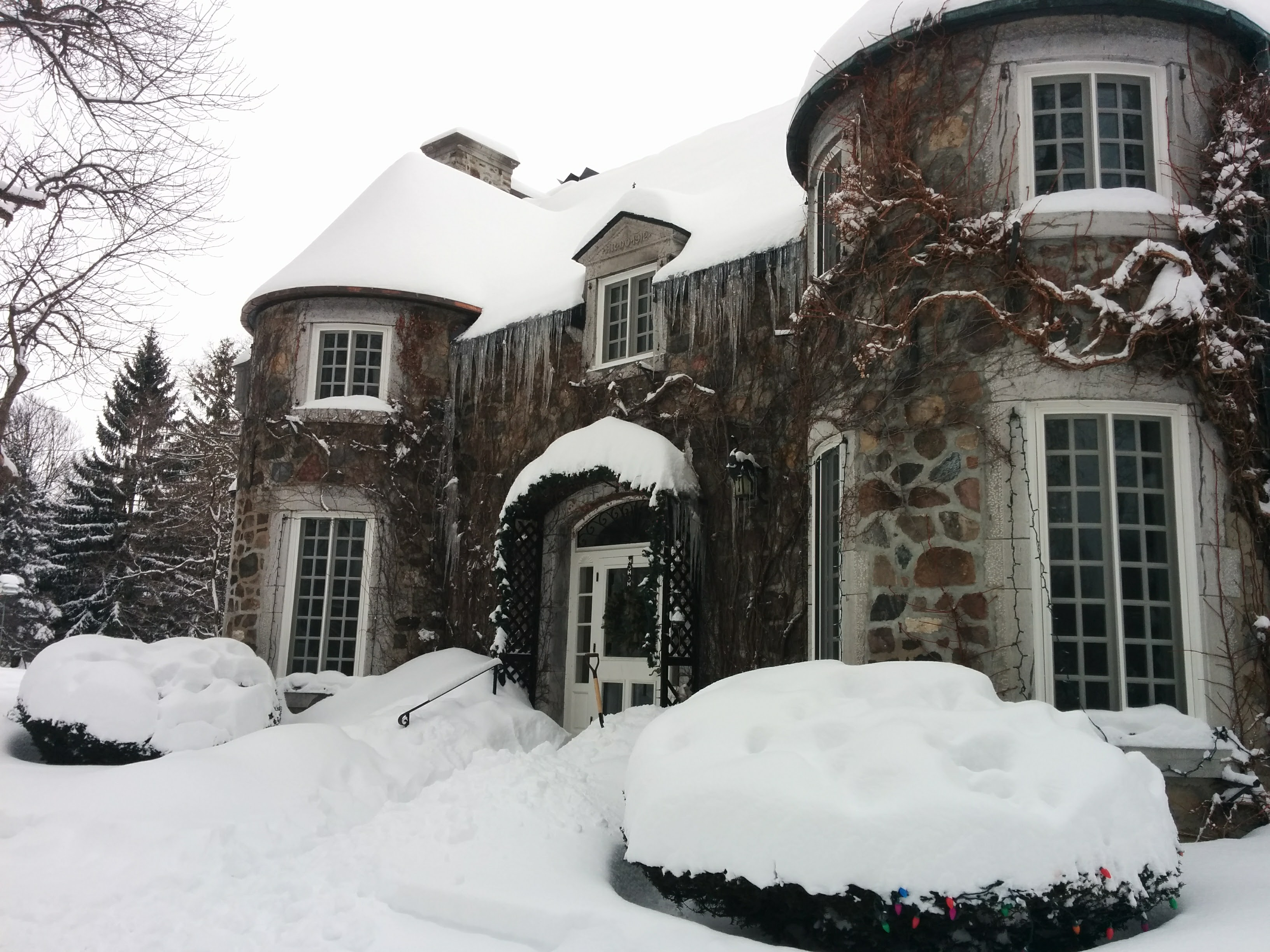
View of the main house and main entry flanked by the iconic stone turrets.

Le Sabot is a mansion built in 1912, in the town of Senneville, Quebec, for F. Cleveland Morgan. Morgan was a cultural philanthropist and department store owner and the great-nephew of the founder of the Henry Morgan & Co department stores.

Le Sabot was one of the first independent commissions of architect David Shennan, and is now widely considered to be a masterpiece of the residential Arts and Crafts movement in Canada, and an estate of high heritage value.

== Location and description ==
The property is located along the shores of the Lake of Two Mountains, in the West Island town of Senneville. It is a 1.6 hectares (4.0 acres) property commonly known as the Morgan Estate. It is bounded to the north by the lake, to the south by Senneville Road, and to the east and west by neighbouring properties.

The property is gated with stone walls and a wrought iron entry gate. The land slopes downward toward the shoreline, with sweeping lawns, mature hardwood trees, a French garden, garden pool, ponds, and a tennis court. The main house is set well back from the road in the centre of the property, and a rectangular pool sits to its north. Ancillary structures include a dovecote, log cabin, and storage sheds.

The home consists of four volumes: the main house, the kitchen connection, the garage, and the annex. The main house is the most iconic, featuring two fieldstone turrets that frame the main entrance. It came to be widely known as "Le Sabot" (the Boot) but is also known as "Le Bousquet".

== Morgan family ==
Alongside other Scottish immigrant families like the Redpaths and McTavishes, the Morgans were titans of Montreal's Golden Square Mile, home of the city's elite.

Cleveland Morgan was an avid collector known for his curatorial work at the Montreal Museum of Fine Arts, and the house demonstrates his refined tastes, and served as a setting for his expansive personal collection. Le Sabot is where Cleveland Morgan lived, entertained and pursued his passions for art and botany. The list of visitors to the house is a veritable "who’s who" of Montreal society.

The property housed four generations of Morgans. In 2017 the last of the Morgans to reside in the house, Elizabeth Morgan, sold the property to the Thibault family. Much of the family collection was sold at auction, with some pieces donated to Montreal Museums.

== Architectural heritage ==
The property is listed in the Canadian Register of Historic Places as a key estate that contributes to the designation of Senneville as a Historic District and exemplifies the criteria for consideration:

- It illustrates the synergy created between the major Montreal financiers at the turn of the 20th century and some of the greatest Canadian architects of the period;
- It illustrates the development of Picturesque landscape design, as well as vernacular and Arts and Crafts architecture from 1865 to 1930;
- It is a recognized example and masterpiece from the history of Canadian landscape design and architecture.

Architect David Shennan was considered to be among a small group that included some of Canada's greatest architects and designers of the period. His project in Senneville sits in the company of work by the Maxwells, Shattuck, Nobbs and landscape architect Frederick Law Olmsted. They shared a picturesque approach to landscape design, an eclectic approach to architecture and an affinity for the Arts & Crafts Movement which is plainly evident at Le Sabot.

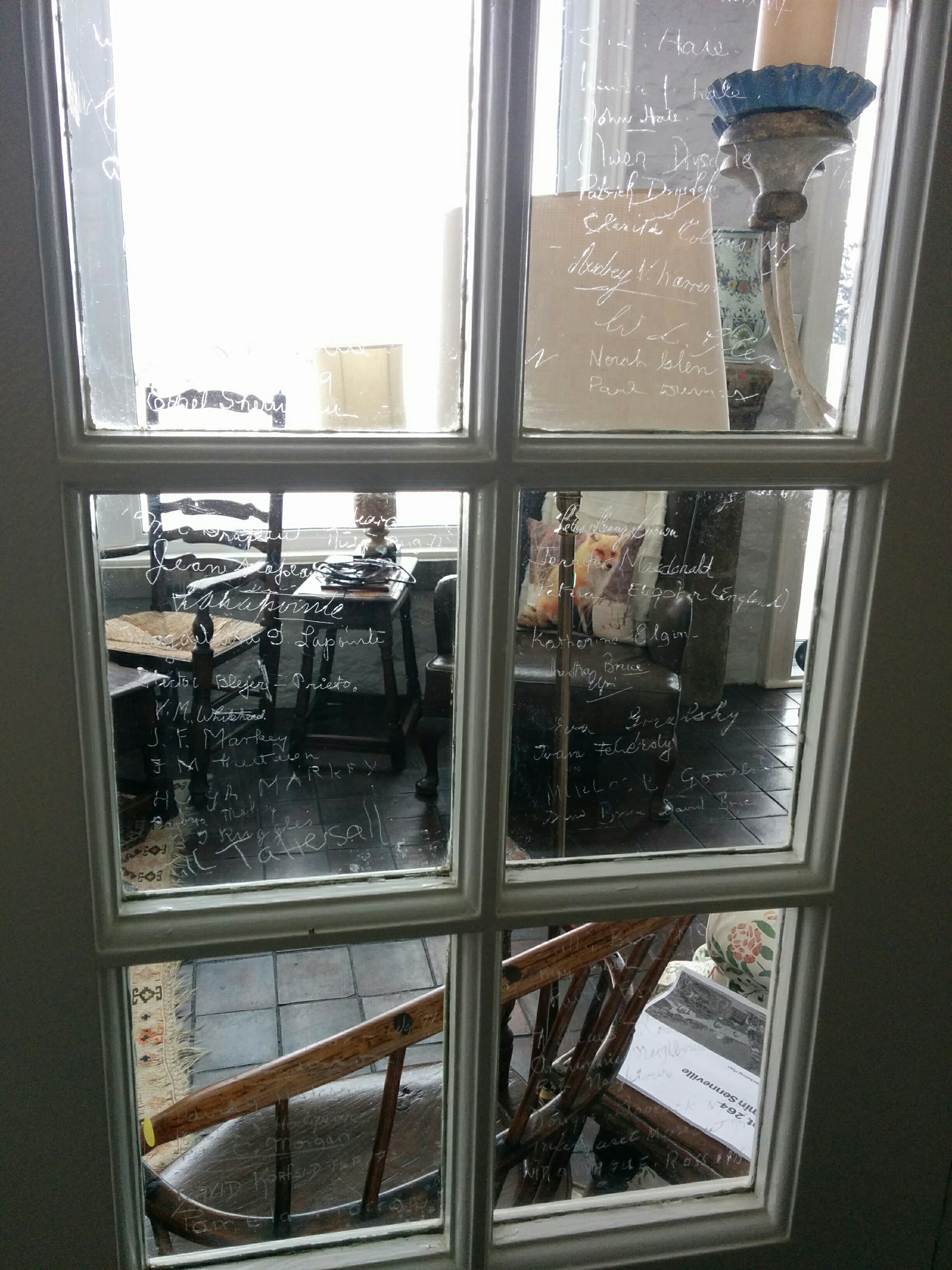
French doors with window panes signed by famous visitors to the house.

Visitors to the house were encouraged to sign the window panes with a diamond-tipped pen. As a result, there are hundreds of signatures on the windows and French doors, many from prominent Canadians. Some of the names include humorist Stephen Leacock, artist Clarence Gagnon and Sir John Abbott.

== Renovations ==
The second floor of the main house was severely damaged by a fire in December 2014 It underwent a restoration in 2015.

In 2017, le Sabot underwent a major renovation. The servants quarters were demolished and the garage was converted to a two-story great room. The kitchen was remodeled and enlarged, and a conservatory was added. The new design was done by the Westmount firm of Valente & Venditti architects.
