= Bay Building (Montreal) =

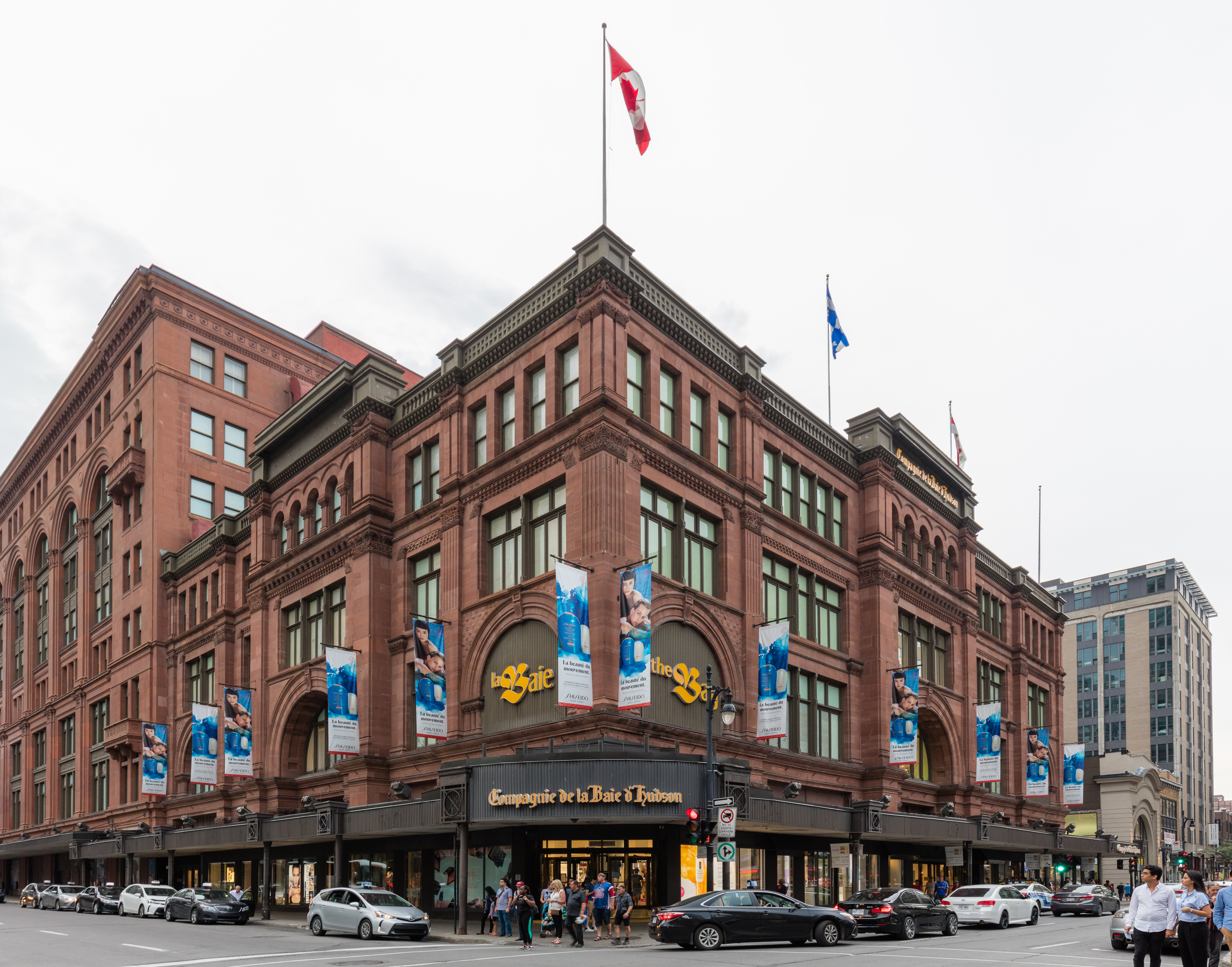
- Exterior of the Bay Building (2017)
- Interactive map of the Bay Building area
- Former names: Henry Morgan Building; (French: Maison Morgan)

General information
- Status: Open
- Type: Department store
- Architectural style: Neo-Romanesque
- Location: 585 Saint Catherine Street West, Montreal, Quebec, Canada
- Coordinates: 45.5042°N 73.5693°W
- Current tenants: —
- Year built: 1889–1891
- Opened: 1891
- Renovated: 1923; 1964
- Closed: 2025
- Client: Henry Morgan
- Owner: Hudson's Bay Company

Technical details
- Floor area: 60,850 m^{2} (655,000 ft^{2}) of selling space

Design and construction
- Architect: John Pierce Hill

Other information
- Public transit access: McGill

The Bay Building (originally the Henry Morgan Building; French: Maison Morgan) was a department store on Saint Catherine Street West in downtown Montreal, Quebec, Canada. It was designed by John Pierce Hill for Henry Morgan, and opened in 1891. It was the flagship store of the Morgan's department store chain, was acquired by the Hudson's Bay Company in 1960, and was converted to a regional The Bay flagship store in 1972.

The store was accessible to the Montreal Metro via McGill station, for which two entrances are located on Union Avenue.

== History ==
=== 1891–1972: Morgan's ===
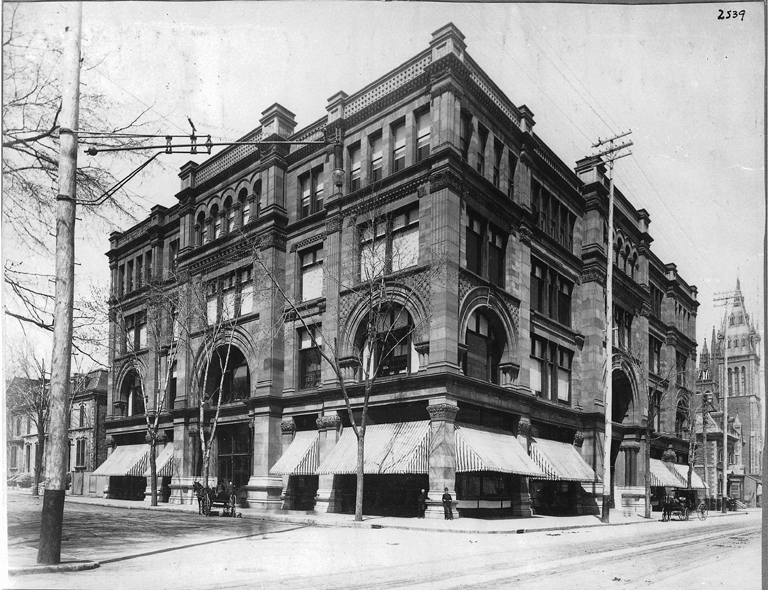
Exterior of the Henry Morgan Building (circa 1890)

Built from 1889 to 1891 to a design by the American architect John Pierce Hill (1849–1920), the four-storey Neo-Romanesque building was constructed from imported Scottish Old Red Sandstone for Morgan's department store, which HBC acquired in 1960. The site had previously been occupied by terrace-type townhouses along Saint Catherine, Union and Alymer, built with stones from the ruins of the 1849 Parliament Building, including the former home of Dr. William Hales Hingston, mayor of Montreal from 1875 to 1877, at the southwest corner.

The building was modified in 1923 (eight-storey Beaux-Arts style addition clad with red stone to match the original store) and 1964 (eight-storey modernist annex along De Maisonneuve Boulevard). The later addition is mostly windowless, with windows only on ground level and in four arched features along De Maisonneuve and Union.

=== 1972–2025: Hudson's Bay ===
While the Morgan's stores were acquired by the Hudson's Bay Company in 1960, the Quebec locations retained their original name until 1972.

HBC announced plans to renovate Hudson's Bay Montreal Downtown to accommodate a 18,580-square-metre (200,000 ft^{2}) Saks Fifth Avenue facing De Maisonneuve Boulevard in 2016. The project was expected to be completed by fall 2018, but plans had been shelved by that February.

It was one of six locations tentatively spared from the creditor protection and liquidation filed by HBC in March 2025. However, on April 23, 2025 due to court rulings deeming it "low probability" to find a buyer to keep the remaining six stores afloat, HBC announced liquidation and permanent closure of all Hudson's Bay stores which started on April 25, 2025 and closed in June 2025. The store's iconic yellow sign was removed the following year, in March 2026.

== See also ==
- Phillips Square, located south of the store
- Promenades Cathédrale, connected underground with the store
- Hudson's Bay Queen Street, flagship store in Toronto
- Hudson's Bay Vancouver Downtown, flagship store in Vancouver
