= United Cigar Stores Limited =

Former cigar store chain in Canada

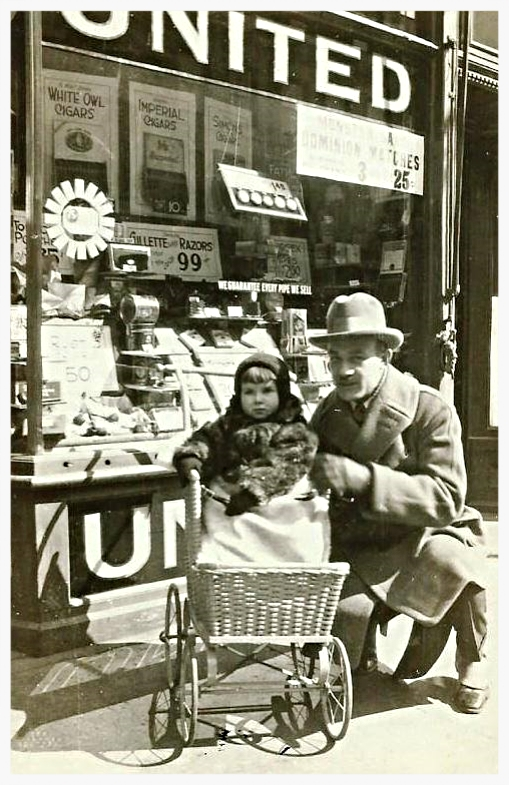
United Cigar store front in Ottawa, Canada in the 1930s

United Cigar Stores Limited was a Canadian chain of cigar stores based in Toronto, Ontario which at one point had operations across the country. It once included United Cigar Store Agencies, which operated as franchisers of the brand.

The red fronted buildings once spotted the Toronto landscape, but had largely disappeared by the late 1990s, shortly after the company had been acquired from Imasco by Hachette Distribution Services, when the vast majority of locations were renamed Great Canadian News Co. However, at least one location, in the basement of the Toronto Coach Terminal, had remained under the United Cigar Stores name.

In 2014, LS Travel Retail (the former HDS, which had been acquired by Lagardère Group) sold the chains to Gateway Newstands, which promptly rebranded all locations (including the Toronto Coach Terminal store) under its own banner.

== Advertising ==
The following is the primary body copy of an advertisement which ran in "Toronto's 100 Years".

Few institutions have become more inseparably a part of Toronto than have the familiar red fronts of the United Cigar Stores and Agencies.

You see them everywhere. As Toronto's homes spread out over wider and wider areas this great chain of stores brought its services to each new neighborhood.

For years Toronto has depended to a remarkable degree on United Cigar Stores and Agencies to fill its varied smoking needs. United responds to that trust with a service that brings fresh new stocks of smoking materials and sundries almost to everyone's door.
