= Henry Morgan (merchant) =

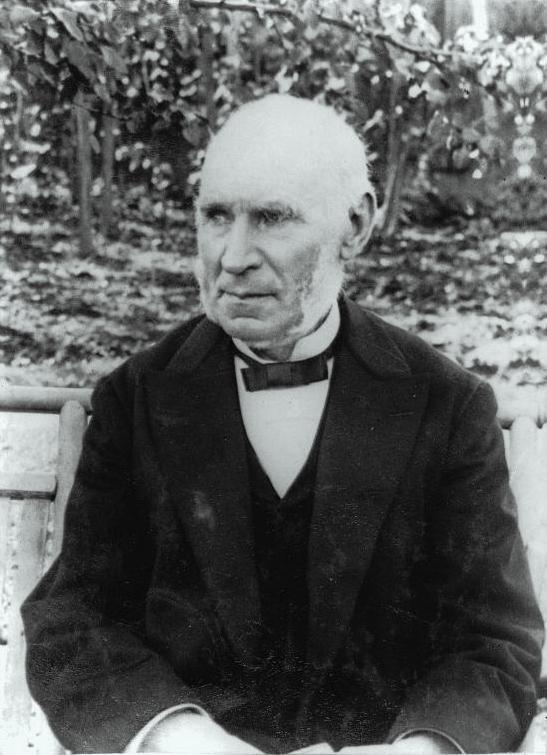
Henry Morgan

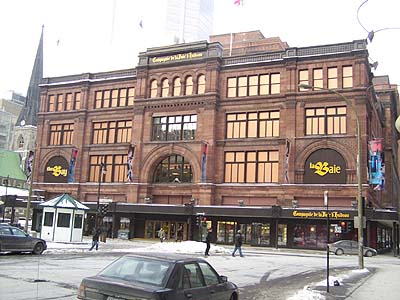
Henry Morgan's Montreal department store

Henry Morgan (November 14, 1819 – December 12, 1893) was a Scots-Quebecer department store pioneer in Canada who founded Henry Morgan & Company.

== Early life ==
Henry Morgan was born into a family of humble circumstances in Saline, which was an isolated village six miles (10 km) northwest of the royal burgh of Dunfermline, Fife, Scotland. He received the basic education that was available before he took a job with a wholesale dry goods firm in the city of Glasgow.

== Career ==
In 1844, after he had gained sound knowledge of the textile business, saved a small amount of money from ten years of hard work, and obtained a loan from his brother-in-law John Davie, the ambitious Henry Morgan decided to emigrate. Encouraged by David Smith, a fellow Scot in Montreal, Quebec, Morgan believed that a better life existed in Canada than in Scotland, which was faced with "the Clearances", and he planned to put his training to good use and open a business there.

Immediately upon his arrival in Montreal, Morgan joined with his friend David Smith to begin preparations to set up a retail dry goods store in rented premises on Notre-Dame Street. Morgan's brother, James, had also been trained in the business and invested in the store but remained in Glasgow to oversee the purchasing and shipping of goods to Montreal. In May 1845, Smith & Morgan opened for business. Records show Morgan working 18-to-20-hour days, but the hard work brought success. The product line was draperies and curtains, sewing fabrics, household linens and a variety of woollen goods.

Under the terms of the business contract, the partnership with Smith ended in 1850. Believing that he could do better without Smith, Morgan did not renew their partnership and set up Henry Morgan & Company to buy out the business assets. While Smith moved on to Chicago, Illinois, James Morgan emigrated to Montreal to take over his responsibilities in the store. Henry Morgan then hired a representative in London, where he could choose from a variety of goods available from the many textile importers and manufacturers' representatives. Within a few years, Morgan's was one of the largest stores of its kind in Montreal.

Morgan traveled to Europe on merchandise buying trips, and in Paris, France, he visited Le Bon Marché, that country's first department store. Impressed by what he saw and aware that Americans had begun copying the idea, he opened in 1866 what became the first department store in Canada. The business occupied four floors of a new building on St. James Street and carried a selection of merchandise with a wholesale cost of more than half a million dollars. Morgan came up with the idea for window displays and frequently changed the products to catch the eye of passers-by.

As he approached sixty years of age, two of Morgan's nephews joined the firm. Over time, he handed over more and more of the day-to-day management of the business to the younger generation, but in the mid-1880s, Morgan began plans to build a huge new department store. He had been part of enormous growth in the economy of Montreal, and the expanding city was creeping from its business hub at the waterfront up the hillside to the residential plateau below Mount Royal. In 1891, Morgan opened his four-storey department store on Sainte-Catherine Street. Others followed, and the area soon became the new centre for retail merchandisers.

Two years after his new store had opened, Morgan died and was buried in the Mount Royal Cemetery in Montreal. His company continued to prosper well into the second half of the 20th century, and stores were opened in several major cities in Ontario. Henry Morgan and Company remained a private family business through four generations until 1960, when it was sold to the Hudson's Bay Company. The large store Henry Morgan built on Saint Catherine Street operated under the Morgan name until 1972. It remained as one of Montreal's most important shopping venues under the Hudson's Bay brand name, until its liquidation in April 2025.

== See also ==
- Morgan's Department Store
- Henry Morgan Building - now HBC flagship store and formerly as Morgan's.
