= Morgan's =

Department store chain of Canada

Henry Morgan & Company

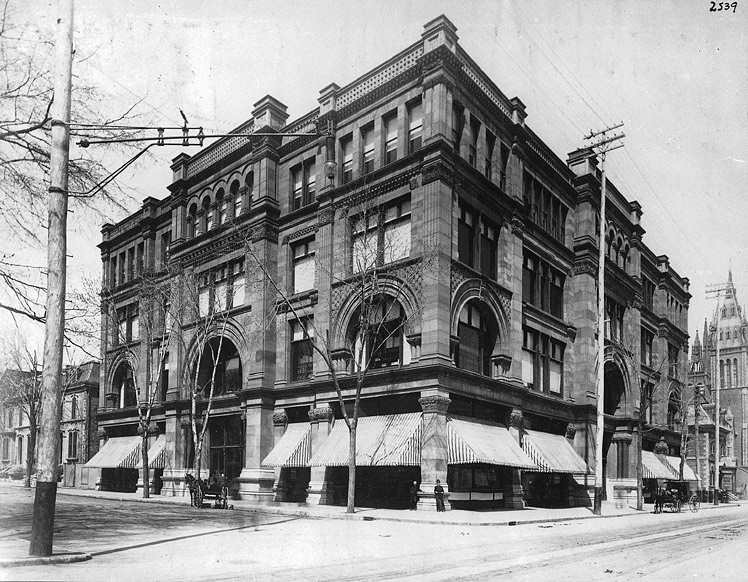
- Henry Morgan Building, the flagship store in Downtown Montreal (1890s)
- Industry: Retail
- Founded: 1845; 181 years ago in Montreal, Quebec
- Founder: Henry Morgan
- Defunct: 1973; 53 years ago
- Fate: Acquired by the Hudson's Bay Company
- Successor: The Bay
- Headquarters: 585 Saint Catherine Street West, Montreal, Quebec, Canada
- Number of locations: 11 (at peak)
- Area served: Quebec; Ontario
- Owner: Hudson's Bay Company (1960–1973)

Henry Morgan & Company (colloquially Morgan's) was a Canadian department store chain founded by Henry Morgan in 1845. The first store was in Montreal, and expanded to include 11 stores in Ontario and Quebec before being bought by Hudson's Bay Company in 1960. Most Ontario stores were converted to The Bay in 1968 and the Morgan's locations in Quebec were renamed La Baie in 1972.

The flagship store was in the Henry Morgan Building in Downtown Montreal, and remained a flagship property of the Hudson's Bay Company until its bankruptcy and liquidation in 2025.

== History ==
The first store was opened in Montreal in 1845 by Scottish immigrant Henry Morgan as Henry Morgan and Company at 200 Notre Dame Street (now 404 Notre Dame St. W), then moved in 1852 to 100 McGill Street (now 478 McGill St.; addition at 3-5 St. Joseph, now 610 Notre Dame W., in 1857) and again in 1866 to the north side of St. James Street (Saint Jacques Street) at Victoria Square. In 1891, they built a new flagship store at 585 Saint Catherine Street West in front of Phillips Square. This store opened as businesses were moving away from the old city centre and helped to make Saint Catherine Street the principal street for shops in Montreal.

The second store to operate under the Morgan's name opened in 1950 on Queen Mary Road in the Snowdon area of Montreal. Other stores then opened on the island of Montreal, and in several Ontario cities. Ownership of the store was originally split evenly between Henry Morgan and his partner, David Smith. Smith's portion was later purchased by Henry's brother, James Morgan. The store stayed under the ownership and management of the original Morgan brothers and their descendants for over 100 years of business.

In 1960, Hudson's Bay Company purchased Morgan's. In January 1968, the stores in Toronto and Hamilton were converted to The Bay, a familiar name in Western Canada that was already being used in Ontario for the past two years in tandem with Morgan's. The rebranding to The Bay affected a total of four Morgan's stores in the two cities. The store on Bloor Street in Toronto kept the Morgan's name albeit managed by The Bay. The Morgan's stores in Quebec were converted to La Baie on June 19, 1972.

The store on Sparks Street in Ottawa continued with the Morgan's name until the location closed on April 14, 1973. No terminations resulted from the shuttering of the store; all employees were offered jobs within the locations of the Freimans chain which Hudson's Bay Company had acquired the previous year. Freiman's would itself get replaced by The Bay two months later on June 25, 1973.

== 1945 Commemorative Wedgwood Bowl ==
In 1945, Morgan's Department Store commissioned a Wedgwood bowl, designed by Keith Murray, to commemorate the store's 100th anniversary in Montreal. Black and white transfer prints on the front and back contrast Montreal as it was in 1845 and in 1945. Relief portraits on each side of Jean Baptiste and John Bull are surrounded by colourful maple leaves, shamrock, rose, thistle, and fleur-de-lis and celebrate the city's French and English heritage. The inside of the bowl is decorated with the coat of arms and motto Concordia Salus (Salvation Through Harmony), colourful maple leaves, and the following English and French inscriptions around the upper rim: "Discovered by Jacques Cartier in 1534, Founded by Maisonneuve in 1642, Decouvert par Jacques Cartier en 1534, and Fonde par Maisonneuve en 1642". The underside of the bowl has the Morgan's and Wedgwood logos and provides the population data for Montreal in 1845 (45,000) and 1945 (1,500,000). This footed bowl measures 12 1/4" in diameter, and is 6 3/4" high.

== Legacy ==
Three former Morgan's stores were most recently in operation as The Bay: the flagship in downtown Montreal and the suburban locations in Eglinton Square Shopping Centre and Rockland Centre. The Bay at Rockland relocated in 1983 within the same mall and the Eglinton Square store was converted in 2023 as a liquidation outlet for the chain. All three stores are among the locations that were liquidated with the rest of the Hudson's Bay chain in 2025.

The Montreal locations in the Boulevard Shopping Centre and Dorval Gardens shopping malls lasted until 2018 and 2021 respectively. In Ontario, virtually all The Bay stores, that had previously been Morgan's locations, closed between the 1970s to 2000s decades.

== Locations ==
- Montreal
  - St. Catherine St. (1845)
  - Queen Mary Road (1950)
  - Le Boulevard Shopping Centre (1953)
  - Dorval Gardens (1954)
  - Centre Rockland (1959)
- Toronto
  - Bloor/Yonge (1950)
  - Lawrence Plaza (1955)
  - Cloverdale Mall (1960)
  - Eglinton Square (1963)
- Hamilton
  - Greater Hamilton Shopping Centre (1957)
- Ottawa
  - Sparks Street (1951)

== Gallery ==
Previous logo in 1960

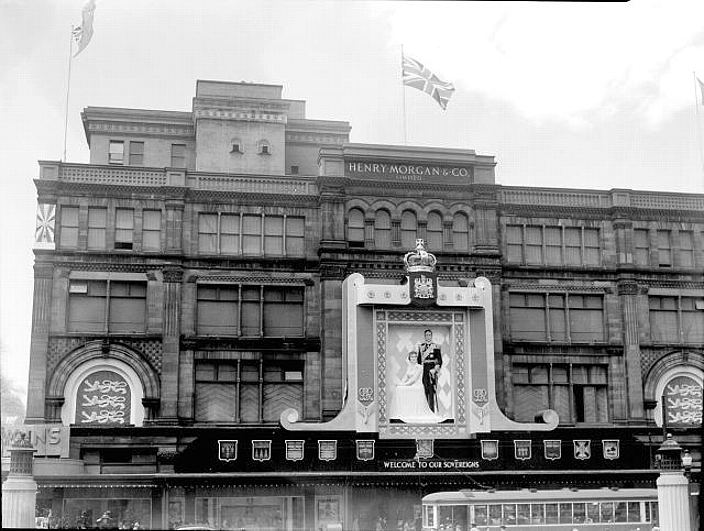
Morgan's in 1939, preparing for a royal visit

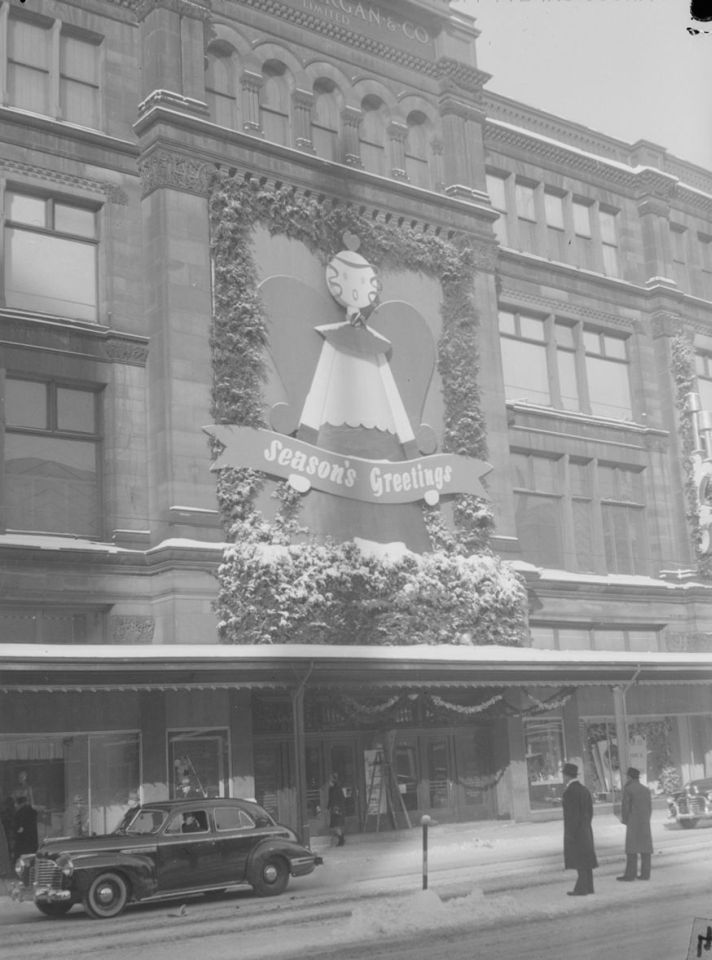
Morgan's at Christmastime, 1944

== See also ==
- List of Canadian department stores
