= Walter Blackwell =

Canadian architect

Walter R. L. Blackwell
- Born: September 26, 1890; Peterborough, Ontario, Canada
- Died: January 21, 1957 (aged 66); Peterborough, Ontario, Canada
- Education: University of Toronto; Columbia University
- Occupation: Architect
- Parent(s): William Blackwell; Maude Annie Hales

Walter Renison Lightfoot Blackwell (September 26, 1890 – January 21, 1957) was a Canadian architect known for his work in Peterborough, Ontario, and a number of Bank of Toronto branches across Ontario. He was the son of William Blackwell and an early partner of Eberhard Zeidler.

== Early life and education ==
Blackwell was born in Peterborough, Ontario, on September 26, 1890, to prominent local architect, William Blackwell, and his wife Maude Annie Hales. His father was the son of English immigrants who were among the first settlers of Douro Township in Peterborough County. Both his father's childhood home and the family home he built are both designated by the City of Peterborough under Part IV of the Ontario Heritage Act.

Blackwell studied architecture at the University of Toronto and Columbia University, completing his education in 1912.

== Career ==
After graduating from Columbia, Blackwell worked as a draftsmen for six months with Cram, Goodhue & Ferguson and later worked for Whitfield & King from 1912 until 1918. In 1919, he returned to Canada and joined his father's firm in Peterborough.

Between 1919 and 1950, Blackwell designed Bank of Toronto branches in Havelock, Bethany, New Lowell, Penetanguishene, Markdale, Brockville, Oakville, Sudbury, Toronto, London, Newmarket and Hamilton.

After his father's death in 1937 he continued his eponymous firm until 1945 when he was joined by James S. Craig and the firm became Blackwell & Craig. In 1951, they were joined by a young German immigrant, Eberhard Zeidler. Blackwell retired in 1955 and died in 1957. Blackwell, Craig & Zeidler eventually became the world renowned Zeidler Architecture.

== Notable works ==
- Prince of Wales Public School, 1919
- Major addition to the Peterborough YMCA
- Major addition to Peterborough Collegiate and Vocational School
- Mark Street United Church
- Peterborough Civic Hospital
