= William Blackwell (architect) =

Canadian architect (1850–1937)

- Born: July 24, 1850; Douro Township, Peterborough County, Canada West
- Died: December 30, 1937 (aged 87); Peterborough, Ontario, Canada
- Occupation: Architect
- Spouse: Maude Annie Hales (m. 1884)
- Children: Walter Blackwell
- Parent(s): James Blackwell; Frances Reid
- Buildings: Peterborough YMCA

William Blackwell (July 24, 1850 – December 30, 1937) was a Canadian architect active in Peterborough, Ontario, for over 40 years. He was among the first architects to use the Romanesque Revival style in Ontario.

== Early life and education ==
Blackwell was born in Douro Township, in a house that is now 1066 Armour Road in Peterborough, Ontario. His father, James Blackwell, emigrated from England in 1815 and initially settled in Ops Township before moving to Douro. His mother, Frances Reid, was the daughter of Robert Reid, one of the original settlers of Douro Township.

Blackwell articled with his cousin, Toronto architect Walter Strickland, then worked in Winnipeg and New York City before setting up his practice in Peterborough in 1880.

== Career ==
Blackwell set up his own practice in 1880. He was an early proponent of the Romanesque Revival style. He designed many landmark residences and public buildings in Peterborough and the surrounding area, often in the Romanesque Revival style. He oversaw repairs to the County Court House after it was damaged by the Quaker Oats factory fire in 1916. In 1919, Blackwell was joined in his practice by his son, Walter R. L. Blackwell. Blackwell retired from the firm in 1930. W.R.L. Blackwell was joined by James S. Craig in 1945 and Eberhard Zeidler in 1953. Under Zeidler, the firm eventually evolved into the internationally renowned Zeidler Architecture.

Blackwell died in Peterborough on December 30, 1937. His wife, Maude Annie Hales, who he married in 1884, remained in the house he designed on Benson Avenue until her own death in 1952.

== Notable works ==
- Nicholls Hospital, Peterborough, Ontario, 1888 (demolished 1981)
- Harstone House, Peterborough, Ontario, 1888
- Academy Theatre, Lindsay, Ontario, 1893
- Young Men's Christian Association, Peterborough, Ontario, 1896
- Young Women's Christian Association, Peterborough, Ontario, 1904–05 (destroyed by fire 1996)
- King Edward Public School, Peterborough, Ontario, 1906 (demolished 2005)
- King George Public School, Peterborough, Ontario, 1913
- Queen Mary Public School, Peterborough, Ontario, 1913
- Bonner Worth Mill Administration Building, Peterborough, Ontario, 1919–20

== Gallery ==
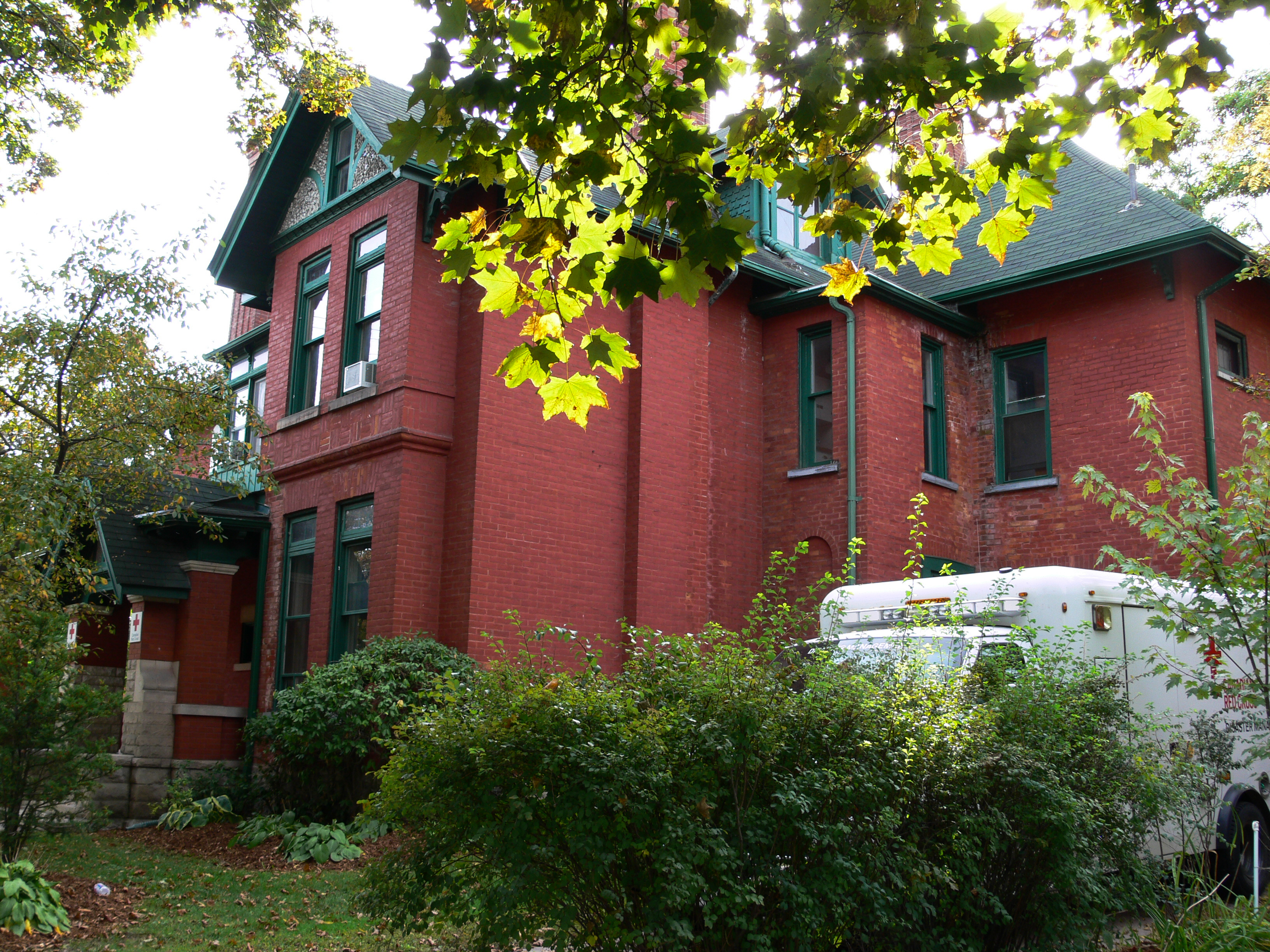
Harstone House

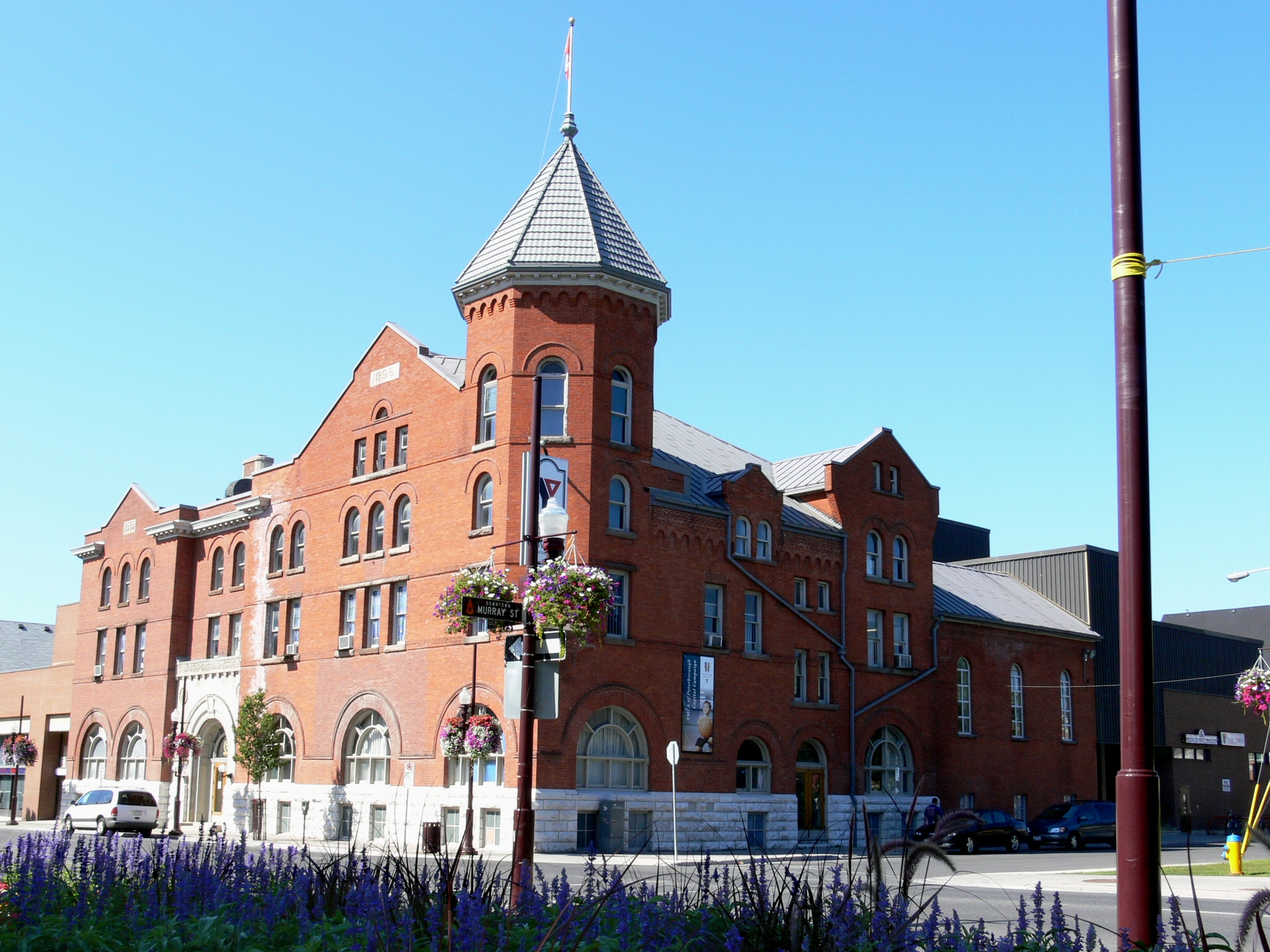
Peterborough YMCA

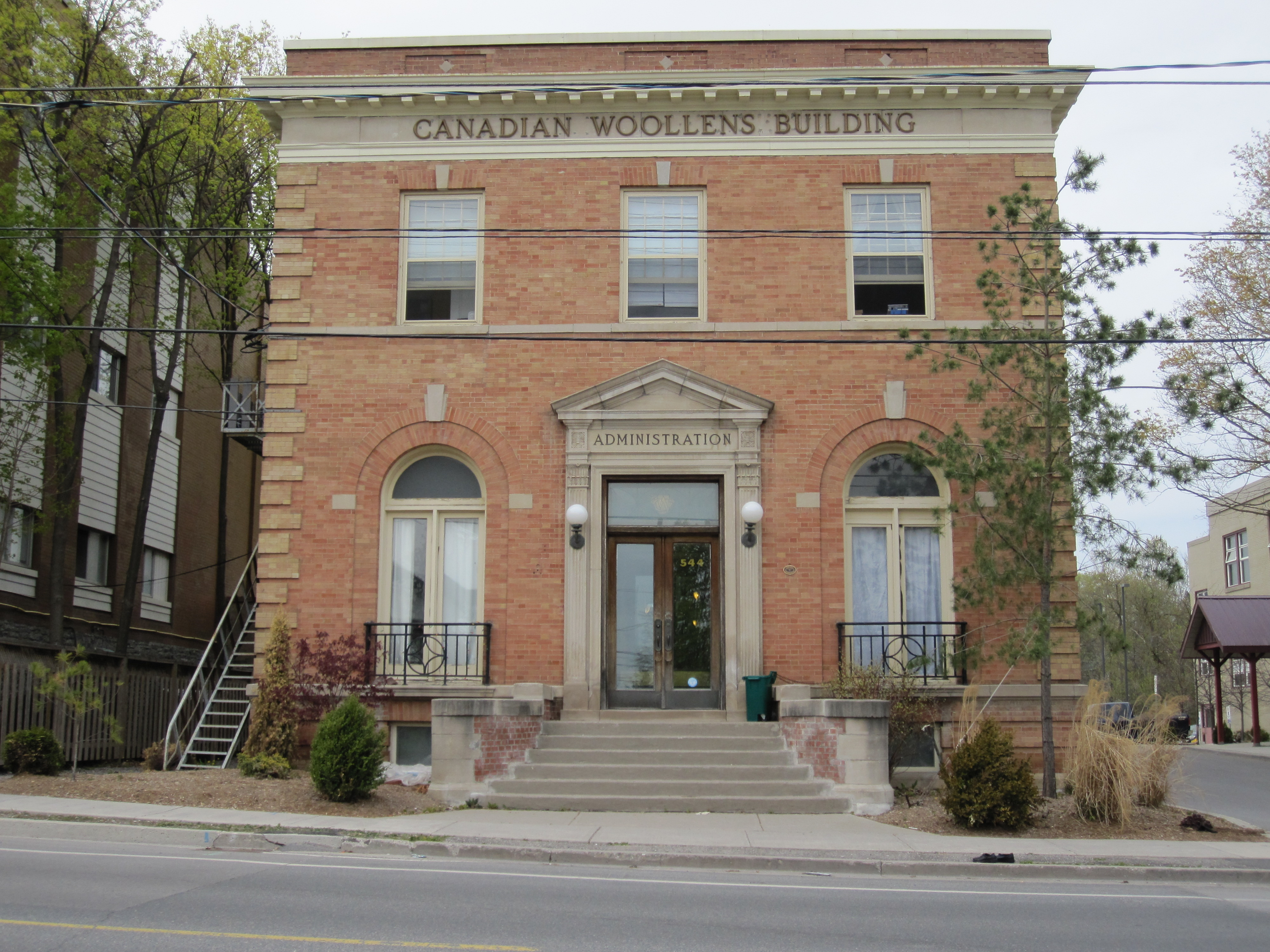
Bonner Worth Mill Administration Building
