= Taza Water Reservoir =

General information
- Type: Infrastructure
- Location: Tsuut'ina Nation, Calgary, Alberta
- Completed: August 2023
- Cost: $18M
- Client: Tsuut'ina - Canderel Land Development LP

Technical details
- Floor area: Pumphouse Building- 3,229.173 sq ft (300 m^{2}) Reservoir & Clearwell-18,620 sq ft (1,700 m^{2})

Design and construction
- Architecture firm: Zeidler Architecture
- Structural engineer: Zeidler Architecture with WSP Global
- Main contractor: Chandos Construction Ltd
- Awards: 2020 Canadian Architect Award of Excellence

The Taza Water Reservoir is a proposed water reservoir and pump house build in Taza Park's Tsuut'ina Nation, Calgary, Alberta. It is projected to be completed in August 2023 and was designed by the firm Zeidler Architecture; costing about $18M in construction, in collaboration with WSP Global.

== Site and access ==
Sited within the Tsuu T'ina 145 reserve, The Taza site spans a total of 1,200 acres, equivalent to the size of 910 soccer fields. It stretches ten kilometers along the Sarcee Trail (now TsuuT'ina trail), bordering the southwestern limits of the city of Calgary, and adjacent to the Foothills County, and Rocky View County, sharing capital and resources alike. It is one of the largest First Nations developments in North America. The entire Taza development is split into three distinct villages, the Taza Park, Taza Crossing, and Taza Exchange; with the water Reservoir built onto the Taza Park, creating a gateway into the reserve. The Reservoir and pump house complex sits at the southeastern limits of the Sarcee Trail and Glenmore Trail intersection; with the Taza Park bordered on the southeast by the Glenmore Reservoir, which receives the Elbow River as it flows through the Tsuut'ina Nation providing much needed resources.

== History ==
The Taza Reserve is occupied by the Dene First Nation known as the TsuuT'ina (formerly called Sarcee people). Although the TsuuT'ina people retained their Sarcee dialect after the split from the Dene Northern Nation, the Tsuut’ina moved to the Canadian Prairies where they adopted parts of the plains culture, distinguishing them from other northern Dene people. The Sarcee people have lived on the 280km2 reserve secured by the clan leader Chief Bull Head, upon signing the 1877 Treaty 7; and have since seen an exponential population growth. With the rapid growth of the city of Calgary, enveloping the eastern boundary of the Tsuut'ina Nation, the Elbow River and Bow River have been stretched thin, disrupting the usual supply of agricultural and Industrial goods needed by the Sarcee for survival. The Taza Water Reservoir and pump house proposal serves first to permanently mitigate the issue of Water supply to the Tsuut'ina community, but also as a gateway into the Taza development.

== Architecture ==
The Taza Water Reservoir structure is built and installed below the park surface, supporting the Pump house which rests above the substructure, projecting into the open. A chain-link fence system wraps around the pump house, and adjacent reservoir area in a conical formation, reminiscent of the First Nations Tipis. The sarcee First Nations people call themselves Tsuut'ina, which translates literally as many people or beaver people, and so the designers at Zeidler Architecture arrayed the fencing organically to create an abstraction to Beaver dams, merging the landscape and built form with Tsuut'ina culture. As the fence loops around the Pump house, it peels upwards at the southern edge, providing views into the space. Visitors are then able to use the infrastructure as a tool to learn about water conservation at Taza park.

== Engineering and construction ==
The exterior wall assembly consisting of glulam columns and structural beams, were handled by the design firm Zeidler Architecture, alongside the fencing. The curvilinear fence is constructed from West Canadian Cedar poles, integrated with repurposed poles from the Tsuut'ina Nation. 1.1in of complementary interlocking profiles are cut into each end of dimensional lumber, to create finger joints on two pieces of wood, which are then glued end-to-end with structural resin, melamine formaldehyde (MF) to create the varying lengths of lumber; these pieces are bent into arches to create the hybrid-cedar panels. The Cedar panels are then assembled in a conical array, to create the security fencing upon which solar panels will be erected on the southern limits. For the pumphouse structure, the end-to-end glued Timber pieces are planed on both sides, stacked, and laminated with phenol formaldehyde resin under a high pressure clamping bed. These columns and beams are cured at room temperature for 10-15 hours before the pressure is released, and assembly begins. The electrical requirements of the pump house is fulfilled by the solar panels, alongside high R-value wall assemblies, in order to yield net-zero building emissions as a target. This form of renewable energy presents a much lower carbon footprint in line with Tsuut'ina’s sustainability parameters. Zeidler Architecture collaborated with WSP Global to introduce insulated glazing, energy efficient pumps, and progressive wall assemblies to further reduce the carbon footprint of the infrastructure, contributing to the vision of the Tsuut'ina Nation to be North America’s Indigenous green leader by 2030.
