= The Knightsbridge Apartments =

Coordinates: 51.5012°N 0.1640°W

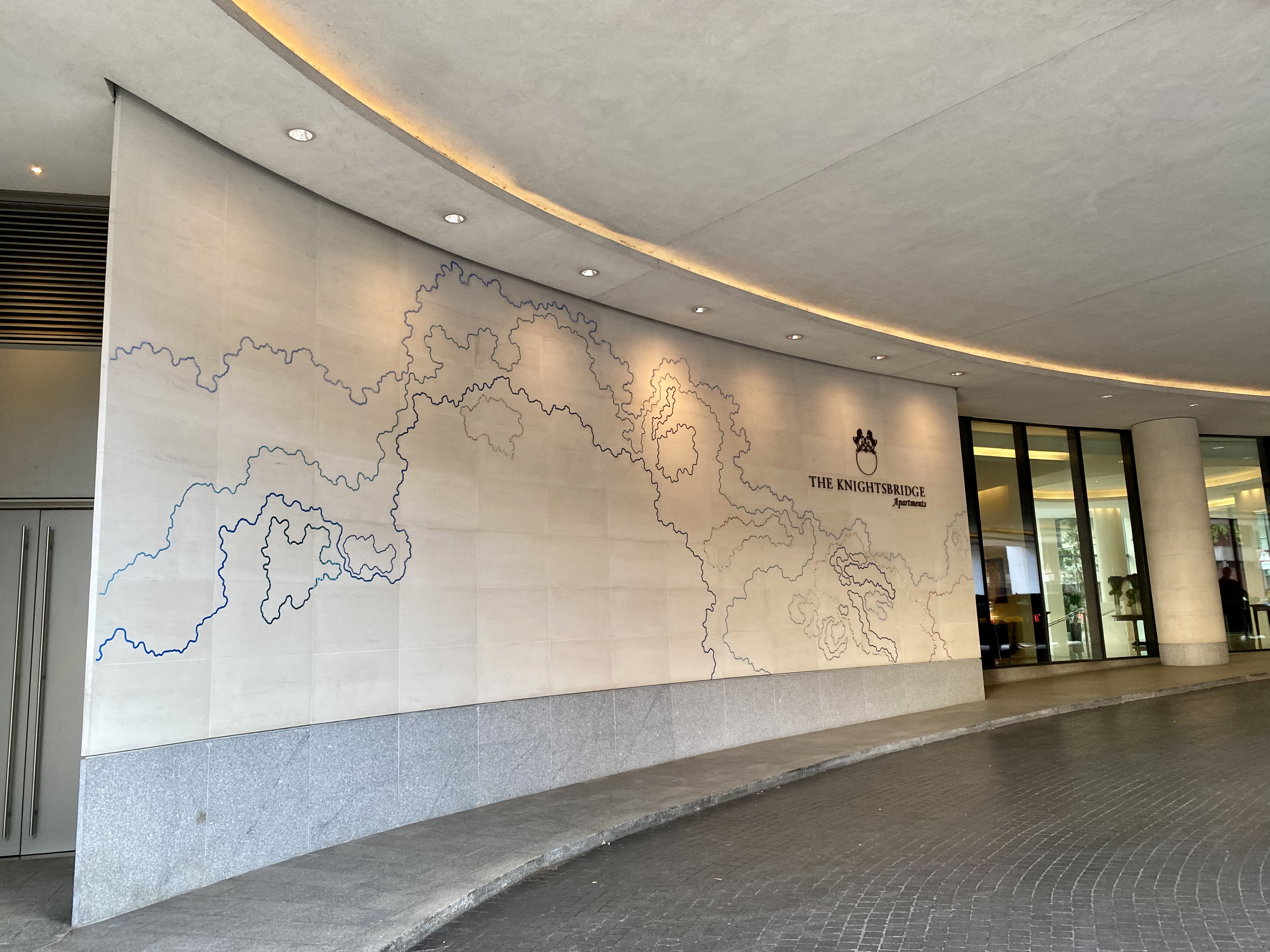
- The entrance to The Knightsbridge Apartments in 2023
- Interactive map of the The Knightsbridge Apartments area

General information
- Type: Residential
- Location: 199 Knightsbridge, London, England
- Construction started: 2002
- Completed: 2005

Technical details
- Floor count: 12

Design and construction
- Architect: Squire and Partners
- Developer: Sammy Sean Lee

The Knightsbridge Apartments is a luxury apartment complex in Knightsbridge, London.

== Location ==
The building is located adjacent to the Bulgari Hotel and Residences and next to 10 Lancelot Place and Trevor Square. It is close to the department store Harrods and Hyde Park.

== History ==
It was built where Mercury House stood from 1957, until it was demolished in 2002. It was designed by the architectural firm Squire and Partners. The developer, Sammy Sean Lee, hired the construction firm Brookfield Multiplex. The building was completed in 2005. It is 43.65 metres high and cost $195 million to build. Prior to opening, a magazine entitled Gold was published to promote the building.

It houses 201 apartments, with a communal garden square. The interior designers were Jane Churchill, Kelly Hoppen, and Joanna Wood. There are two levels of underground parking for residents. There is a spa and a swimming-pool and a round-the-clock security and concierge service. It was the recipient of the Residential Development of the Year award at the 2006 Property Awards.

== Notable residents ==
Ashley Tabor has had a flat in The Knightsbridge Apartments since 2006, bought for £15 million. In 2017 he bought the next door flat for £90 million. In October 2017, Westminster City Council's planning department turned down his plan to combine the two flats to create the UK's most expensive flat, a £200 million penthouse with ten bedrooms.
