= Minto Midtown =

Residential complex on Yonge Street in Toronto

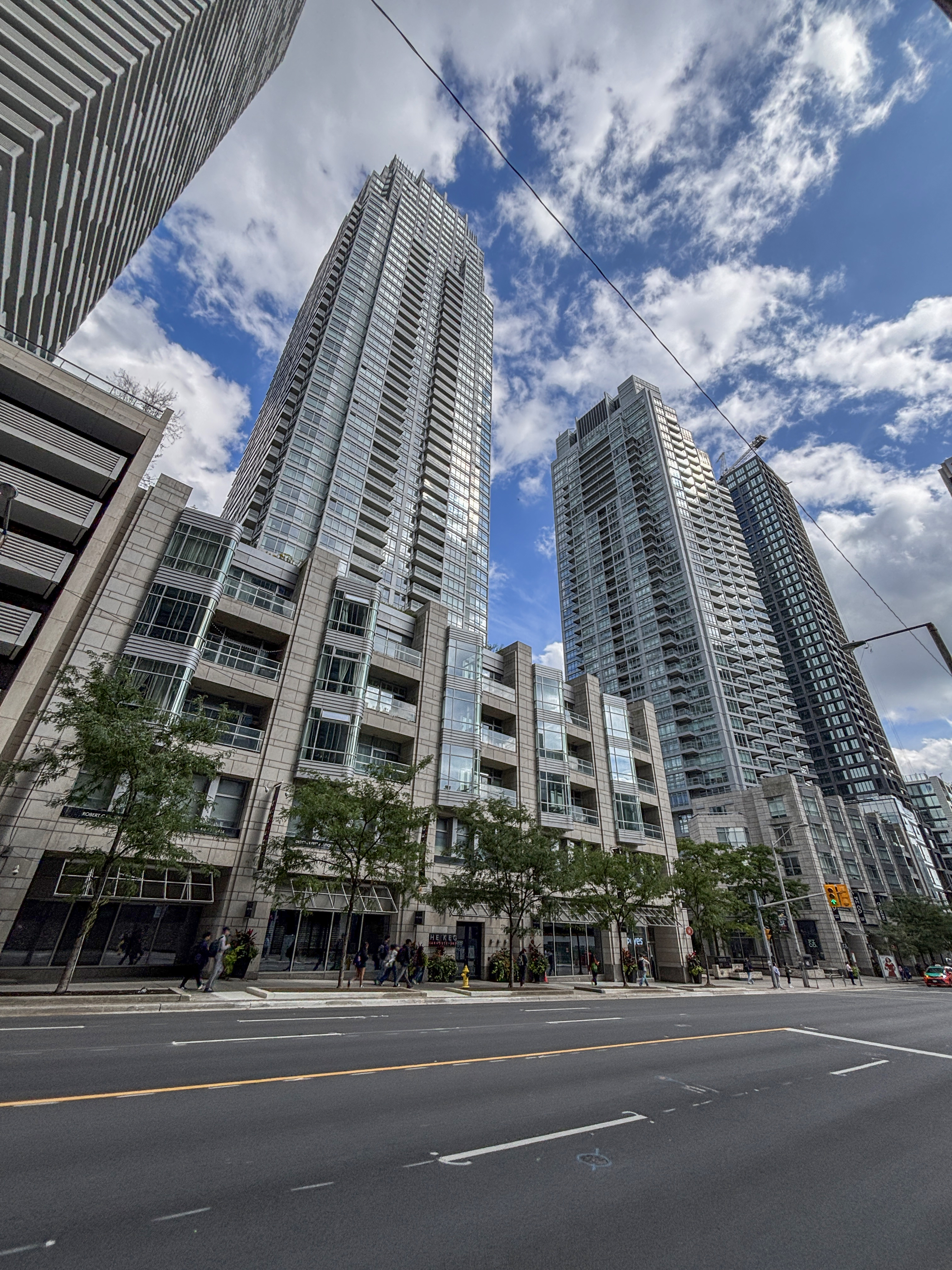
- Interactive map of the Minto Midtown area

General information
- Status: Completed
- Type: Residential
- Coordinates: 43.705454°N 79.397593°W

Height
- Roof: 413 ft (Quantum); 541 ft (Quantum 2)

Technical details
- Floor count: 37 (Quantum); 52 (Quantum 2)

Design and construction
- Architects: Zeidler Partnership Architects and Skidmore, Owings & Merrill
- Developer: Minto Developments Inc.

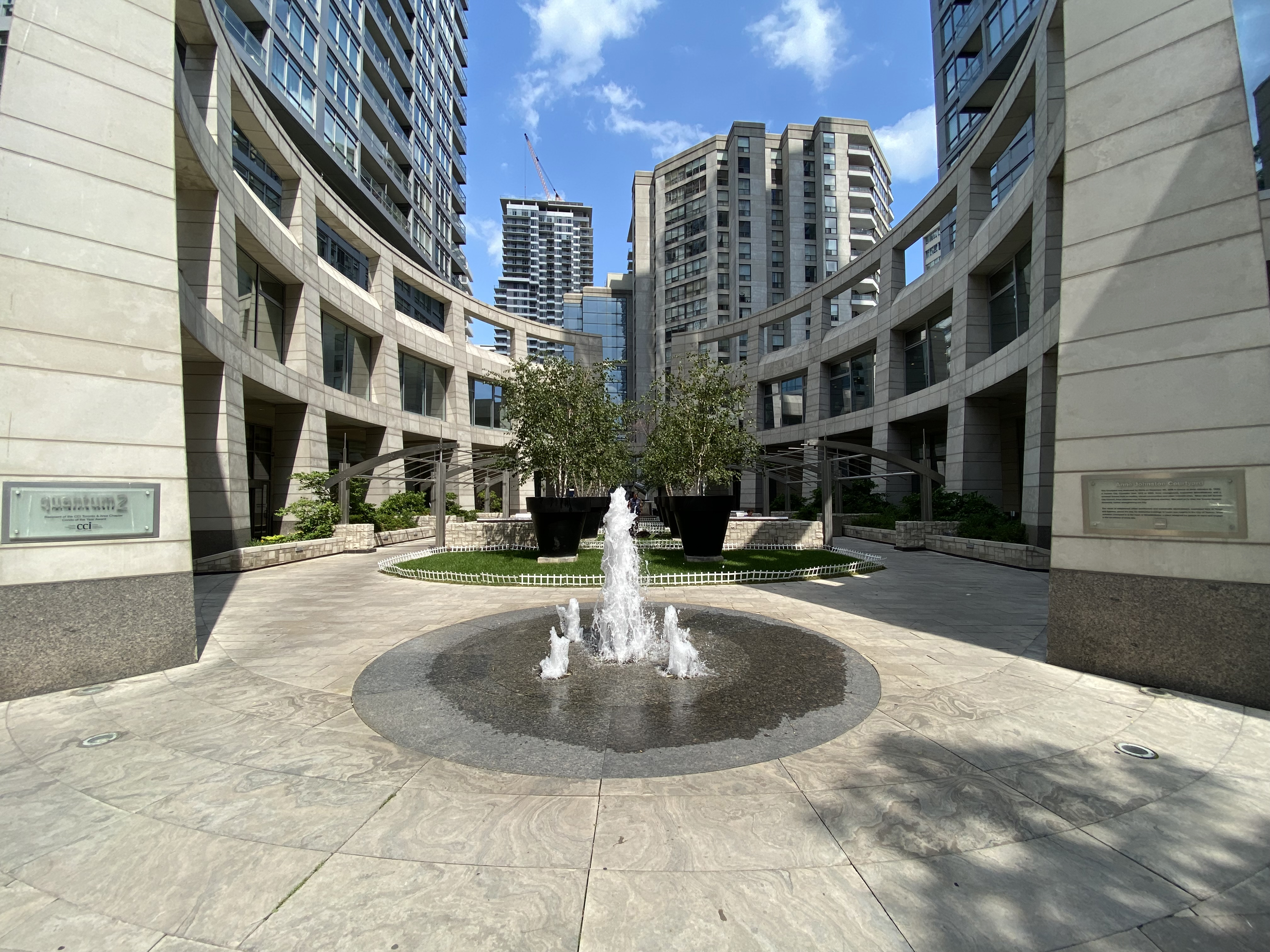
Open space

The Minto Midtown is a residential complex on Yonge Street in Toronto in the Davisville neighbourhood near Yonge and Eglinton consisting of two towers, Quantum (37 storeys) and Quantum 2 (52 storeys) developed by Minto Developments Inc. The proposed project—which substantially exceeded existing height and zoning limits—was met with substantial neighborhood and city opposition, until Minto appealed to the Ontario Municipal Board and worked out a deal with the City of Toronto.

Quantum is 37 storeys (413 ft) and was completed in 2007. Quantum 2 is 52 storeys (541 ft) and was completed in 2008. The initial conceptual design was done by Skidmore, Owings & Merrill; Zeidler Partnership Architects developed the design and completed the project.

== History ==
The construction of the towers, the tallest in the neighbourhood, was controversial.

In March 2000, the developer bought the land to be developed and submitted an application for the project in December of the same year, which included the plan for the two towers and demolition of a ten-storey building (below left). The project was greatly in excess of the existing height and density limits. However, the chief planner was considering zoning changes to increase development in the area. The local ward councilor, Michael Walker, kicked the developer out of his office when approached with the proposal and remained steadfastly against the project. Walker had the backing of a number of neighborhood groups, especially the North Toronto Tenants Network. Other councilors were amenable to the proposal. After delays and the city's plans to reject the project, Minto appealed to the Ontario Municipal Board.

Minto reached an agreement with city council, by reducing the height by several storeys, providing CAD $1.2 Million for social housing, and $200,000 for transit connections. The OMB Decision (No.1263) set a new standard for development.

The buildings still sparked a strong response from the North Toronto Tenants Network. The OMB ruled in favour of Minto. The debate over the towers proved central in the 2003 municipal election. Incumbent city councillor Anne Johnston had helped broker the compromise that approved the towers. She was opposed by Karen Stintz, who took a strong stand against the development and intensification. In a result that surprised many, longtime incumbent Johnston lost by 2,321 votes.

== LEED certification ==
This development has achieved Leadership in Energy and Environmental Design (LEED) Gold certification, making it the largest multi-residential LEED certified condominium in North America in 2009.

== Awards ==
In 2011, Quantum 2 tower was chosen as the Condo of the Year by CCI Toronto.

== See also ==
- List of tallest buildings in Toronto
