= Davisville Village =

Davisville
- Neighbourhood
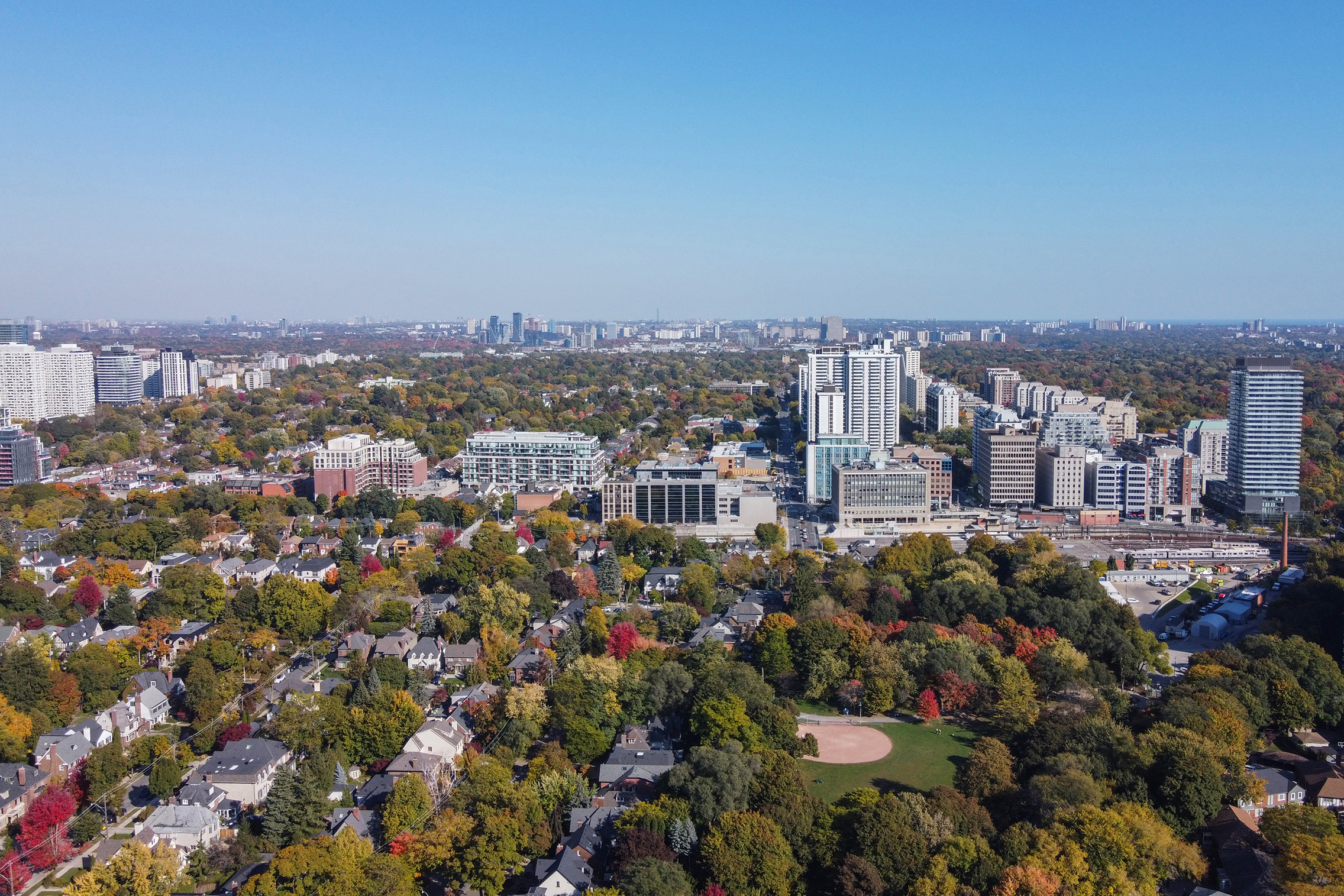
- Skyline of Davisville Village, 2024

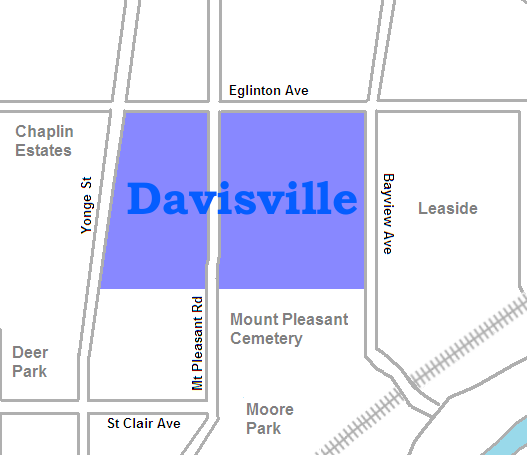
- Vicinity

- Location within Toronto
- Coordinates: 43.701°N 79.389°W
- Country: Canada
- Province: Ontario
- City: Toronto
- Founded: 1840
- Founder: John Davis
- Named for: John Davis

Government
  - Councillor: Josh Matlow
  - MP: Leslie Church (Liberal)
  - MPP: Stephanie Smyth (Ontario Liberal)

Area
  - Total: 3.139 km^{2} (1.212 sq mi)

Population (2021)
  - Total: 32,837
  - Density: 10,461/km^{2} (27,090/sq mi)
- Time zone: UTC-05:00 (EST)
  - Summer (DST): UTC-04:00 (EDT)
- Postal code: M4S

Davisville Village is a neighbourhood of Toronto, Ontario, Canada. It is located near the intersection of Davisville Avenue and Yonge Street. The village corresponds to the Davisville subway station on Line 1. The area directly abuts Mount Pleasant Cemetery, and has many massive apartment and condominium complexes built between the 1970s and the 2000s, as well as a number of office buildings. The area is within Midtown Toronto between St Clair and Eglinton. Davisville Village is represented at Toronto City Council by Councillor Josh Matlow.

== History ==
Davisville was founded by John Davis in 1840. Davis opened the first post office in the neighbourhood and served as the post-master. John Davis also started Davisville Pottery Company, which was the largest employer in the neighbourhood for several years. In 1911, the Davis family sold a large portion of the land to Dovercourt Development Company to be developed. Many single family homes were built between the 1920s and 1930s, and still exist today.

== Demographics ==
Historical population
Year	Pop.	±%
2006	23,690	—
2011	26,998	+14.0%
2016	28,245	+4.6%
2021	32,837	+16.3%

The population of Davisville Village as of 2006 was 23,690. The population of Davisville grew approximately 6.5% between 1996 and 2001, and another 8.5% between 2001 and 2006. Davisville is a densely populated neighbourhood. Given an area of approximately 3.1 km^{2}, it has a density of approximately 7,642 people per km^{2}.

Davisville is a fairly wealthy neighbourhood. As of 2006, approximately 33% of Davisville's households earned more than $60,000 per year, which was more than double Toronto, which had an approximately 16.2% of its households earning more than $60,000 per year.

Davisville has a higher percentage of Canadian citizens than Toronto according to the 2006 census data. Almost 48% of Davisville residents are Canadian citizens compared to 46% in city of Toronto. Between 1961 and 1981 the immigrant population in Davisville remained fairly consistent at approximately 17% of the total population. By 1981 the immigrant population in Davisville increased rapidly and has continued to do so for the past three decades.

The immigrants in Davisville come from many different countries. The country where most of Davisville's immigrants come from is the United Kingdom. In 2006 there were 955 people living in Davisville from the United Kingdom; 480 immigrants living in Davisville from the United States of America; and 470 immigrants from Iran. Other countries of origin for Davisville immigrants are China, India, Philippines, Germany, Poland, Jamaica, South Korea, Romania, and Russia. In 2024, it was reported a growth of Brazilian immigrants in the area.

Davisville is serviced by two TTC subway stations, Davisville and Eglinton station on the Yonge-University line. It also has regular bus service on Eglinton Ave. E. and Bayview Ave. The easy access to public transportation and the proximity to the Downtown core, results in a higher percentage of residents using public transit and self-propulsion (walking/biking). Davisville's transportation mode shows that 46.5% of residents use public transit and 11.9% walked or biked to their destination, compared to the City of Toronto's transportation mode which shows that only 34.4% of residents use public transit and 8.8% walk or bike. The 2006 census data also shows that Davisville neighbourhood has a lower percentage of vehicle users than the city of Toronto. 40.1% of residents in Davisville use car, trucks, vans, and/or motorcycles to get to their destination compared to Toronto's 55.8%.

== Real estate ==
Like many of Toronto's neighbourhoods, the real estate market in Davisville has undergone incredible growth over the past several years. Davisville has outperformed the Toronto real estate market in general in 2015 and thus far in 2016. As of 2018, the average price of a detached home was $1,365,749, an increase of 16% over 2015. This has been attributed to the neighbourhood's schools, proximity to transportation and the amount of shopping and restaurants available.

== Divisions ==
Davisville Village and its neighbour to the east, Leaside, are usually seen as being a part of the same neighbourhood. The city of Toronto assigns the Davisville Village into two official neighbourhoods:

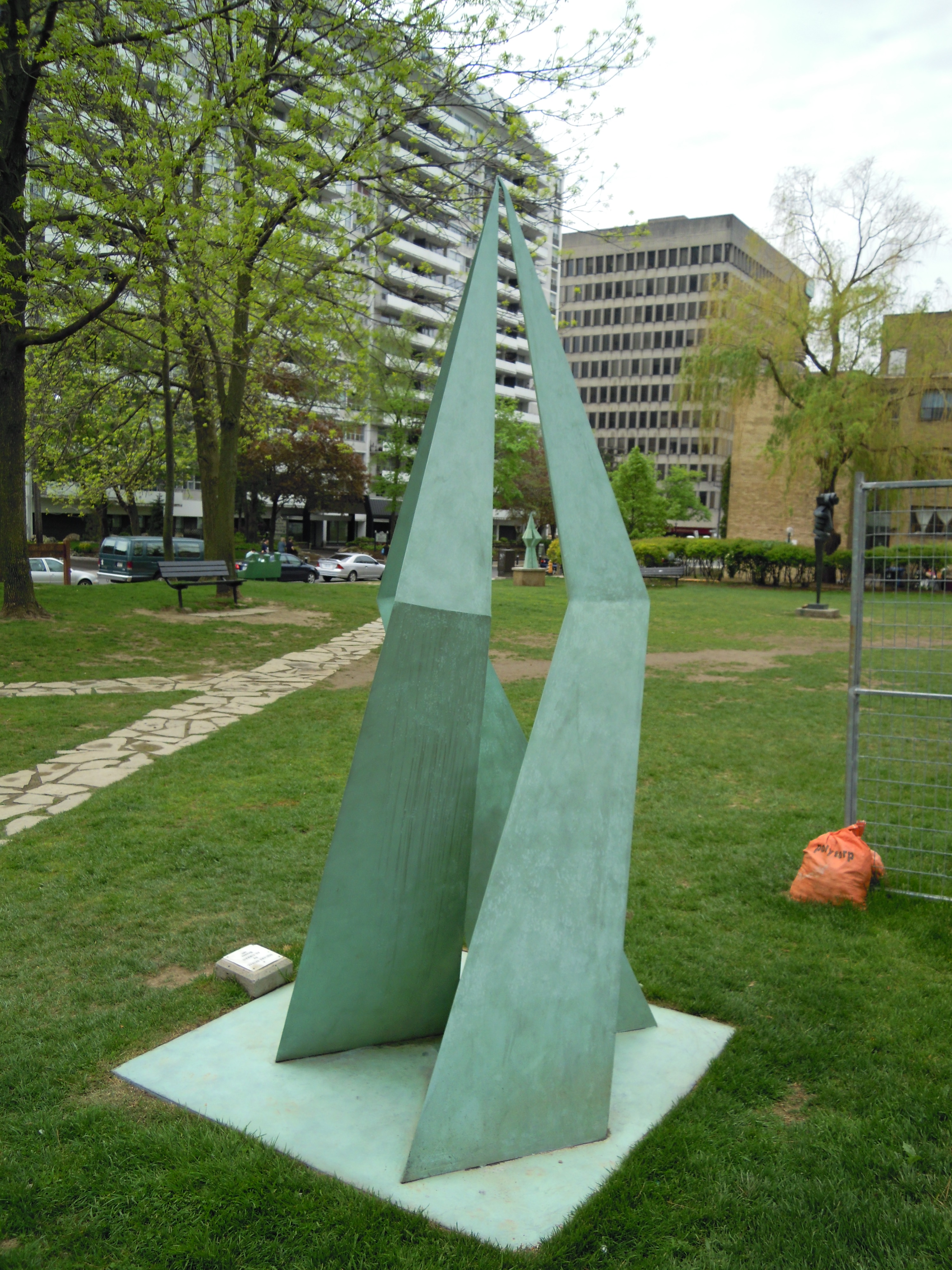
Apartments surround Balliol Parkette in West Mount Pleasant. The majority of the people living in the area live in high/low-rise apartments.

=== Mount Pleasant West ===
Mount Pleasant West is situated west of Mount Pleasant Road, north of Merton Street, east of Yonge Street and south of Keewatin Ave. 91% of people in this neighbourhood live in low/high rise apartment and condo buildings, which makes it one of the most building-dominated neighbourhoods in Toronto (comparable to the high-rise dense downtown core). There are a number of affordable housing units in the area which factors into the lower income levels in this neighbourhood compared to the surrounding ones. Over 80% of residents are renters, which is approximately 30% over Toronto's average.

In 2003 Minto proposed a plan for two high-rise condominium buildings on Yonge Street, south of Eglinton Avenue. A majority of Davisville residents were strongly opposed to the development. The case was taken to the Ontario Municipal Board (OMB), which agreed that in order for Minto's plans to be approved, they needed to comply with the following conditions:

- Reduce building height by several stories.
- Contribute $1 million towards affordable rental housing for seniors.
- Contribute $200,000 towards a new pedestrian walkway.

The Minto towers were built and completed in 2007.

=== Mount Pleasant East ===
Mount Pleasant East is bordered to the east by Bayview Avenue, Moore Avenue to the south, Mount Pleasant to the west and Blythwood to the north. The people in this neighbourhood are predominantly in their working years and house value is above average for the city. It is comparable to The Beaches in demographics and income.
