= Sherway Gardens =

Shopping mall in Toronto, Ontario, Canada

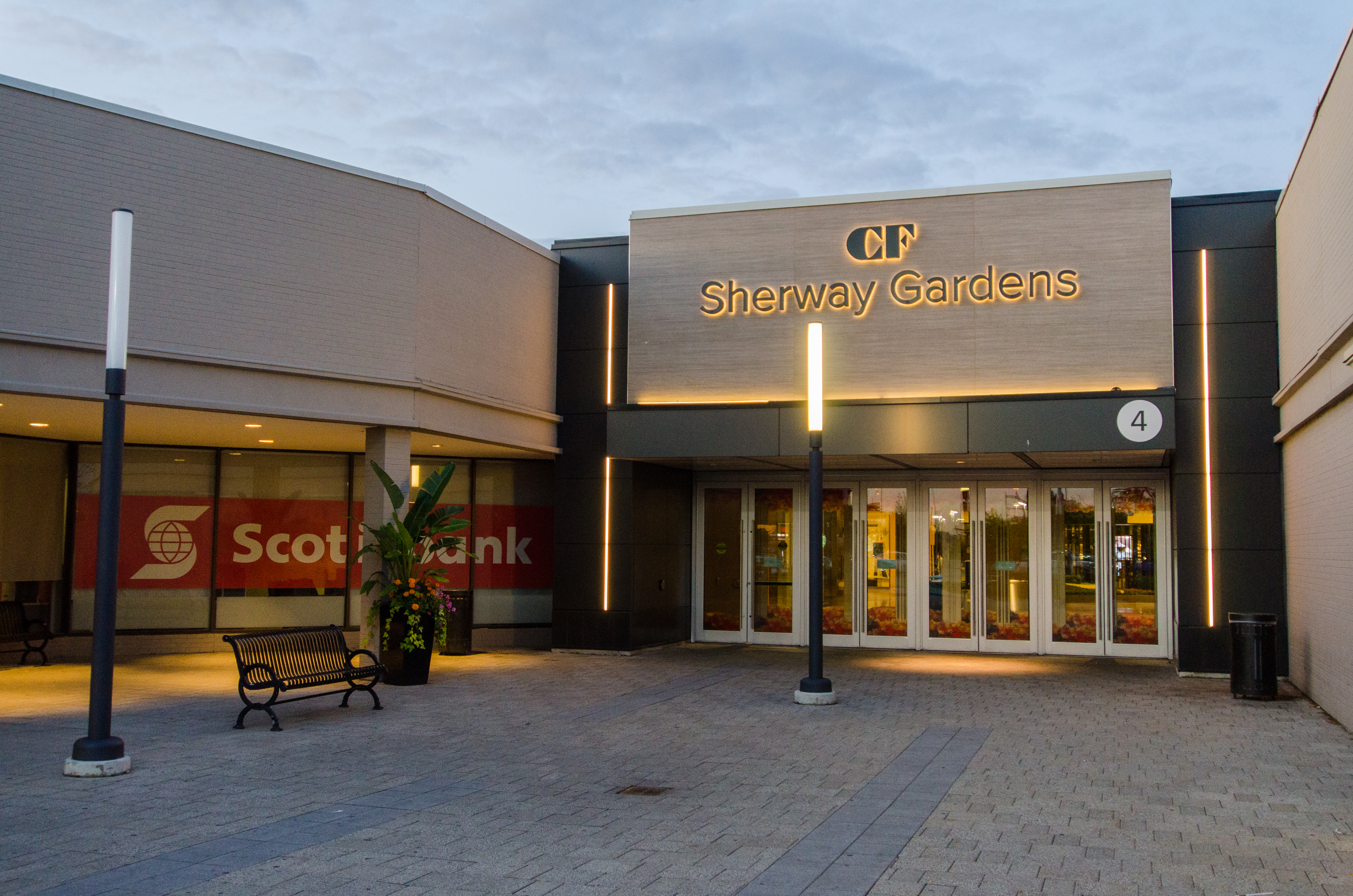
- Northeast entrance at sunset (September 2017)
- Location: Toronto, Ontario, Canada
- Address: 25 The West Mall, M9C 1B8
- Opened: February 24, 1971; 55 years ago
- Renovated: 1989; 2013–2017
- Developer: The Rouse Company
- Manager: Cadillac Fairview Corporation
- Owner: Cadillac Fairview Corporation
- Architect: Henry Fliess and James A. Murray (Phase I and II); Murray, Marshall, Cresswell (Phase III); Zeidler Roberts Partnership (Phase IV)
- Num. of stores: 215
- Num. of anchor tenants: 4 (at peak)
- Floor area: 1,182,000 square feet (109,800 m^{2})
- Floors: 2
- Parking: Parking lots and parking garages
- Website: shops.cadillacfairview.com/property/cf-sherway-gardens
- Building details

General information
- Named for: Sheridan Nurseries and The Queensway
- Construction started: 1969; 57 years ago
- Completed: 1971

Renovating team
- Renovating firm: Cadillac Fairview Corporation

CF Sherway Gardens is a shopping mall in the Etobicoke district of Toronto, Ontario, Canada, near the interchange of Highway 427 with Queen Elizabeth Way and the Gardiner Expressway. The mall spans 1,182,000 square feet (109,800 m^{2}) of selling space and 215 stores, making it the eighth-largest mall in the Greater Toronto Area and the 18th-largest mall in Canada.

It is the first mall developed by the Rouse Company of Baltimore, Maryland (through Canadian subsidiary Sherway Centre Limited) in Canada.

The mall covered 850,000 square feet (79,000 m^{2}) in an S-shaped configuration and 127 stores, including anchors Eaton's and Simpsons, when it opened in 1971. Subsequent expansions brought the mall to its present-day figure eight configuration. As of June 2025, the mall is without conventional anchor tenants. Previous anchors include Holt Renfrew, Hudson's Bay, Nordstrom, Saks Fifth Avenue, Sears Canada, and Sport Chek.

As the mall has grown, it has changed its mix of stores from a general mix of stores to add more fashion-conscious and luxury brand stores.

== History ==
=== 1938–1970s: Background, development, opening and early operations ===
The site where Sherway Gardens currently is was previously a farm owned by Sheridan Nurseries that had operated since 1938 in an area in Toronto nicknamed "The Queensway".

Baltimore, Maryland-based developer The Rouse Company, founded by James W. Rouse, applied to Etobicoke Council to acquire and rezone this 100-acre (40 ha) site on the south side of The Queensway, east of the West Mall, from an industrial development to a commercial development to redevelop the site into a shopping center known as Sherway Gardens Shopping Plaza. The name "Sherway" is a portmanteau of "Sheridan" and "Queensway", while the other term "Gardens" refers to the mall's original use of lots of greenery. This would be Rouse's first mall to be built outside of the United States.

Rouse acquired the site in 1964 and founded the Canadian subsidiary known as Sherway Centre Limited.

However, development was stalled for eight years because of competition from other malls such as Cloverdale Mall, and the council was concerned about the redevelopment plan, citing local traffic. The redevelopment plan ultimately ended up in the OMB before finally being approved. Construction began in 1969. The mall costed approximately CA$21.5 million to complete.

Sherway Gardens had its grand opening on February 24, 1971. The mall was laid out in an "S" shape design. Community events and promotional activities took place at the centre of the mall in the central court with its 31 feet (9.4 m) high skylight. Like other shopping centres, Sherway Gardens contains fountains, indoor greenery (hence the name Sherway "Gardens"), benches and couches for the enjoyment of shoppers. Unlike the designs of other malls, such as the Toronto Eaton Centre, Sherway Gardens was built with "intimate low ceilings".

Rouse founded the subsidiary Rouse Services Limited Canada for Sherway Gardens' day-to-day operations.

Sherway Gardens' original food court, known as the Gourmet Fair, was credited as The Rouse Company opening the first successful food court in an enclosed shopping mall, albeit in Canada and not the U.S., following an unsuccessful attempt with Plymouth Meeting Mall in Plymouth Meeting, Pennsylvania in 1968. While Paramus Park in Paramus, New Jersey was credited as one of the company's first successful food courts in the United States, that mall opened three years later.

The Gourmet Fair included a "tent-like" roof (designed by Eberhard H. Zeidler) and plants throughout the area, following James Rouse's vision for food courts as "community picnics". The success of this food court is what led to the company's first successful food court in the United States being Paramus Park in 1974. However, the food court was demolished for Nordstrom Canada and other shops in the 2010s as part of the mall's renovation and expansion.

The new food court is smaller and is similarly named (but not to be confused with) Gourmet Fare. However, the new food court has been met with criticism with locals, arguing that it has less and boring food options, lacks the "community picnic" feel, and the new stores that replaced the original food court hindering visibility of the unique architectural features like the tent-like roof, especially Nordstrom.

=== After opening ===
In 1975, to accommodate for 75 new retail spaces, the "S" layout was altered to resemble a figure eight. In December 1978, Rouse sold its Canadian subsidiaries to the Toronto, Ontario-based York Hannover Ltd. for $12.6 million while retaining management to focus on its U.S. properties, which took over ownership of Sherway Gardens. In 1987, Holt Renfrew (one of Sherway Gardens anchor retailers) was moved to a location (33,670 square foot) in a newly built wing on the north side of the mall The expansion allowed for 20 additional stores and was later referred to as the "fashion wing", as it housed clothing stores.

In 1989, the mall continued to expand leading to the construction of a new south wing. The new south wing has a large "tent-like" roof structure on its upper level, similar to the food court. The million-dollar canopy, designed by architect Eberhard H. Zeidler, won the Canadian Consulting Engineering Award of Merit. In 2000, the Cadillac Fairview Corporation acquired Sherway Gardens. Following a previous bankruptcy in February 1997, Eaton's filed for bankruptcy again in August 1999 and liquidated all of its locations, and the mall space was taken over by Sears Canada.

=== 2013–2017 renovation and expansion ===
In 2013, Cadillac Fairview announced a CA$335 million renovation and expansion that added 210,000 square feet to the existing 988,000 square foot mall. The project took over three and a half years and added new department store anchors like Nordstrom and Saks Fifth Avenue. The inclusion of Nordstrom required the demolition of the original food court developed by The Rouse Company. This added retail space for 50 stores, a new food court with a capacity of over 1,000 patrons, and a parking structure for 1,200 vehicles. The expansion used limestone obtained from the same quarry that was used in the mall's initial construction.

Sears Canada vacated its space in 2014, which was subsequently occupied by Saks Fifth Avenue (announced on January 27, 2014), Sport Chek and Atmosphere. On September 22, 2015, the 210,000 square feet (20,000 m^{2}) north expansion was opened, including relocated spaces for Holt Renfrew (consisting of a 29,440 square foot ground floor, a 60,425 square foot second floor, and a 12,000 square foot mezzanine level) and Sporting Life (42,0000-square-foot).

In 2016, Holt Renfrew closed its store just a year after being relocated within Sherway Gardens, in favour of a much larger 130,000+ square foot space at Square One Shopping Centre in Mississauga, as part of the chain's changing strategy to operate stores over 120,000 square feet to keep pace with Nordstrom and Saks Fifth Avenue. The entrance was closed off after Tesla, Inc. moved in.

The former Sporting Life store and the Gourmet Fair food court were demolished to make way for Nordstrom Canada, which opened its store on September 15, 2017. However, it was permanently closed on June 13, 2023 as Nordstrom exited Canada.

On November 2, 2023, an Eataly store opened that took over the former Forever 21 and The Pickle Barrel spaces.

The mall has a seasonal farmers' market, located in the north parking lot, every Friday 8 a.m.-2 p.m.

On June 4, 2026, it was announced that T&T Supermarket will open on the lower level of the former Saks Fifth Avenue anchor store in Summer 2027.

On July 16, 2026, it was announced that Splitsville Bowl will open in a portion of the former Nordstrom anchor store in 2027.

On July 24, 2026, Urban Behavior opened on the lower level of the former Hudson's Bay anchor store.

== Transportation access ==
Sherway Gardens

General information
- Location: Sherway Gardens Road; Toronto, Ontario
- Coordinates: 43.609805°N 79.558198°W
- Bus operators: Toronto Transit Commission; MiWay

Other information
- Station code: TTC: 9109; MiWay: 9058
Location

Sherway Gardens is the only major mall in Toronto not served by the Toronto subway. Kipling is the nearest subway station and can be reached by the 123 Sherway bus. Sherway is accessible by private automobile and local transit. Major roads in the area serving the mall include the Queen Elizabeth Way/Gardiner Expressway, The Queensway and Highway 427. The mall is surrounded by large surface parking lots with a ring road surrounding the mall. Toronto Transit Commission and MiWay bus routes connect at special bus platforms located on either side of Sherway Gardens Road, southwest of the mall.

== Notable incidents ==
=== 2021 fight and shooting ===
On August 13, 2021, a fight between two groups in the mall escalated into shots being fired. In response, Sherway Gardens entered into lockdown.

== In pop culture ==
Parts of the movies F/X (1986), Mean Girls (2004), and The Sentinel (2006) were filmed in Sherway Gardens. In Mean Girls, Sherway Gardens stood in as Westfield Old Orchard (in the film mentioned as Old Orchard Mall), a large shopping centre in suburban Chicago where the film takes place.

== Gallery ==
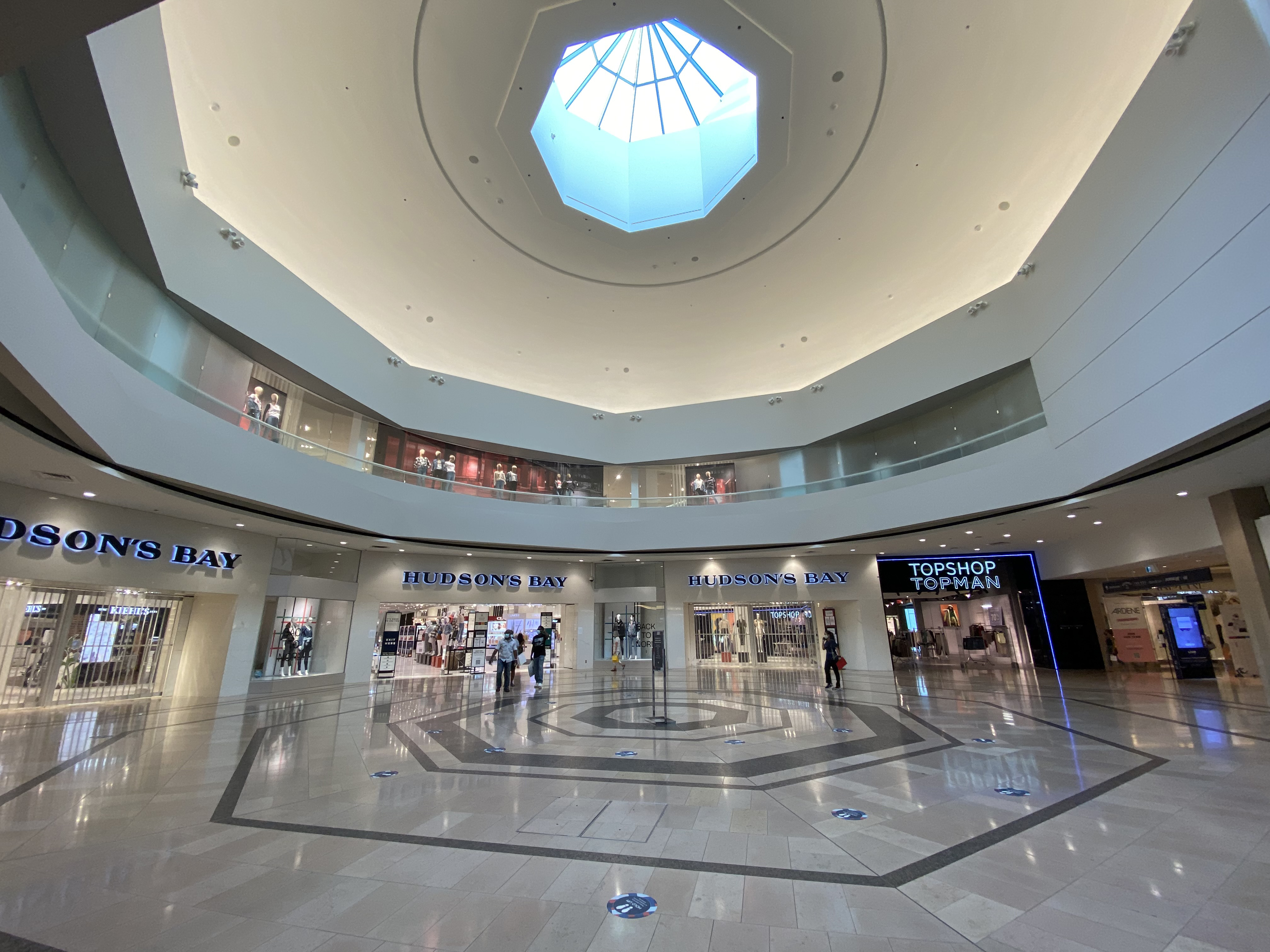
Former Hudson's Bay store

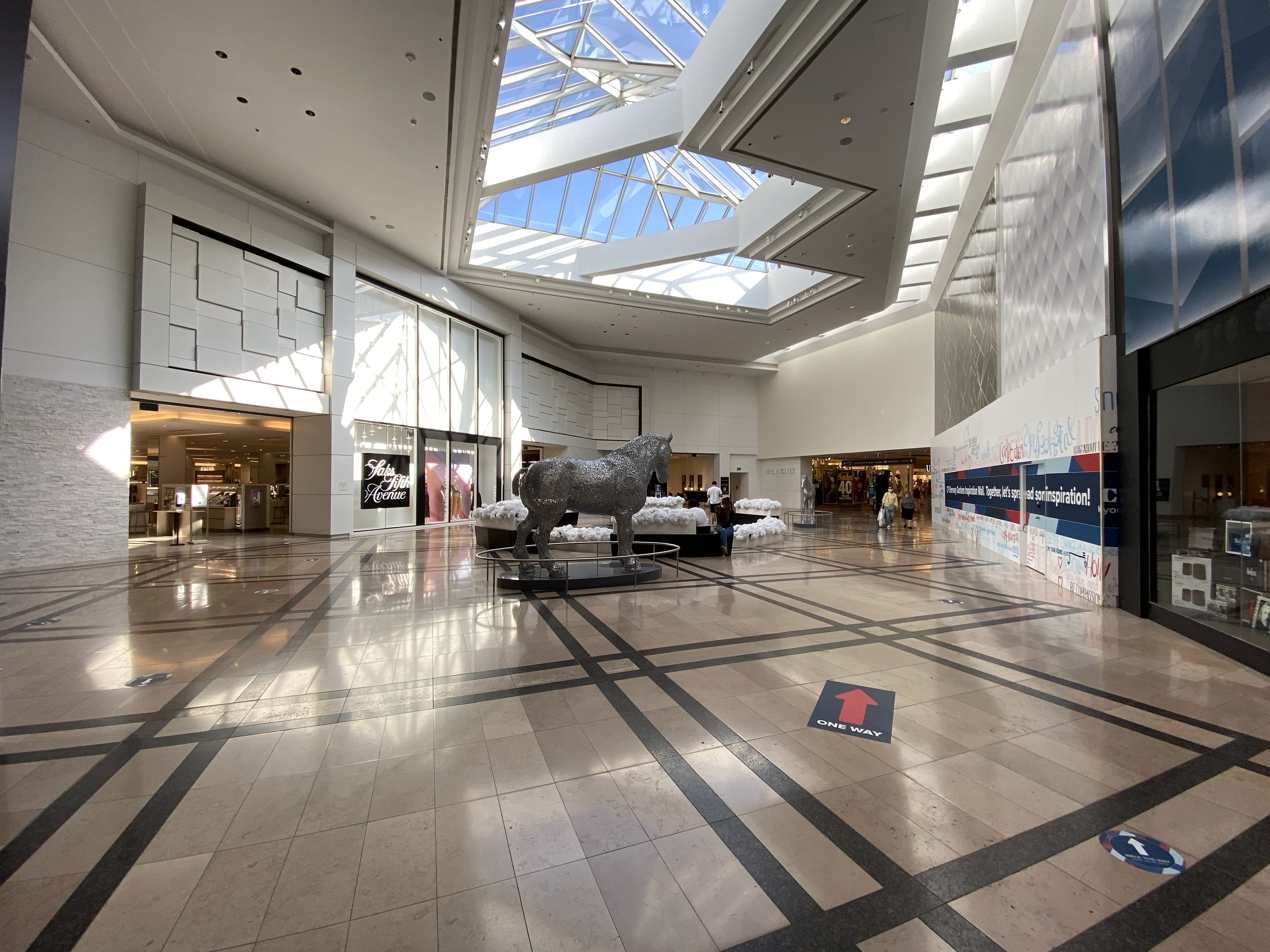
Saks Fifth Avenue was the second-largest retailer at Sherway Gardens

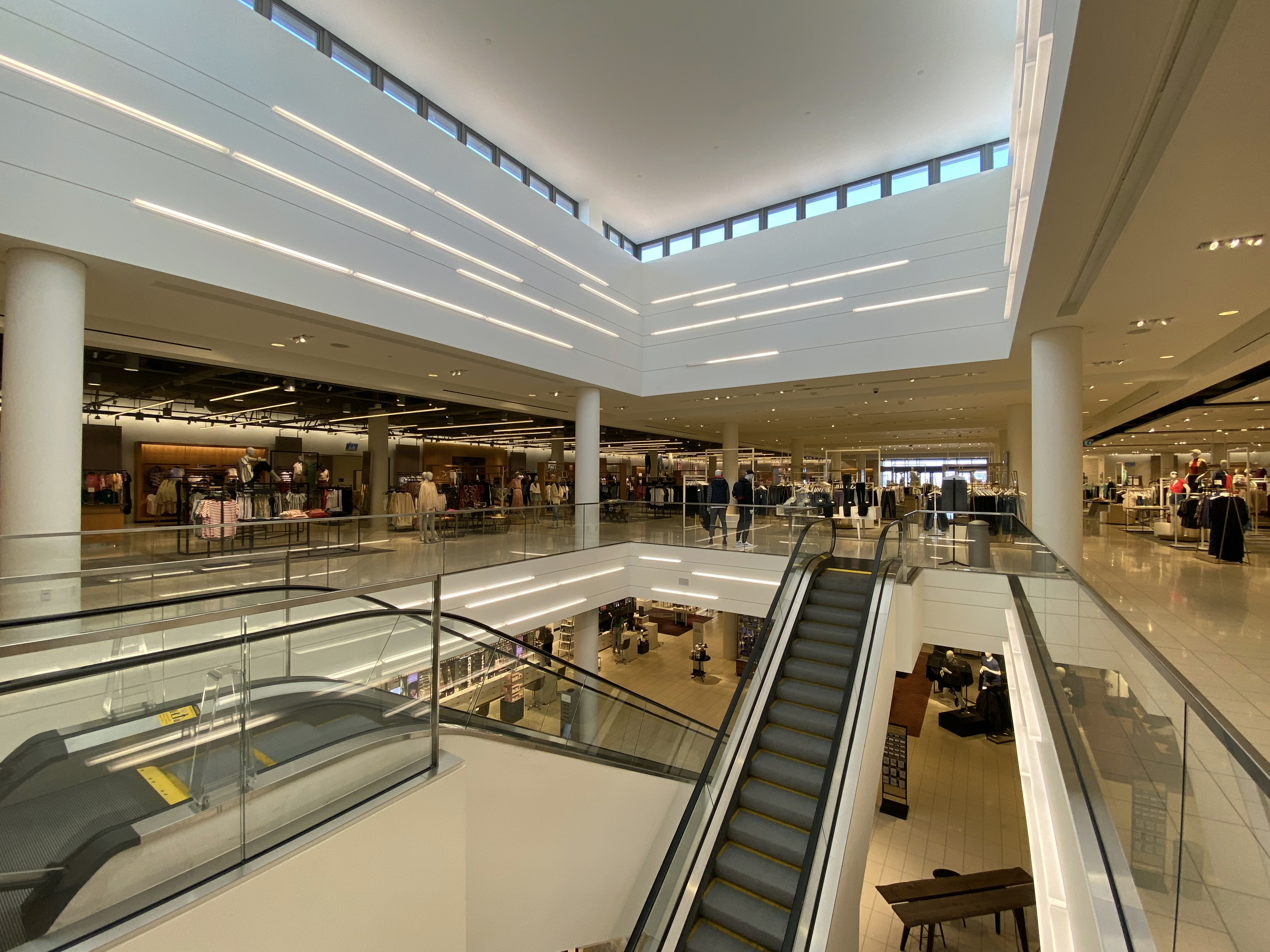
Former Nordstrom in Sherway Gardens

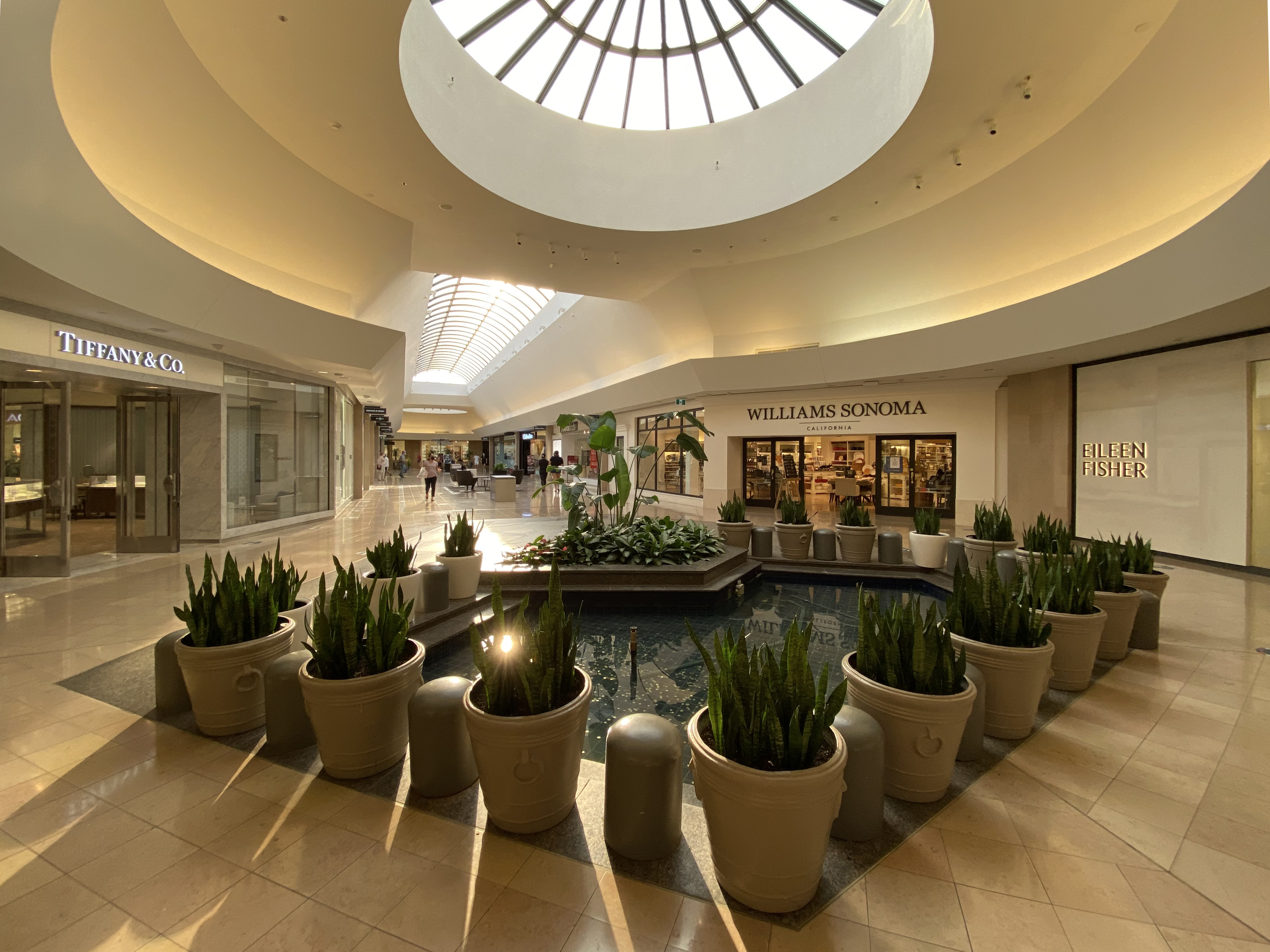
Shops in Sherway Gardens

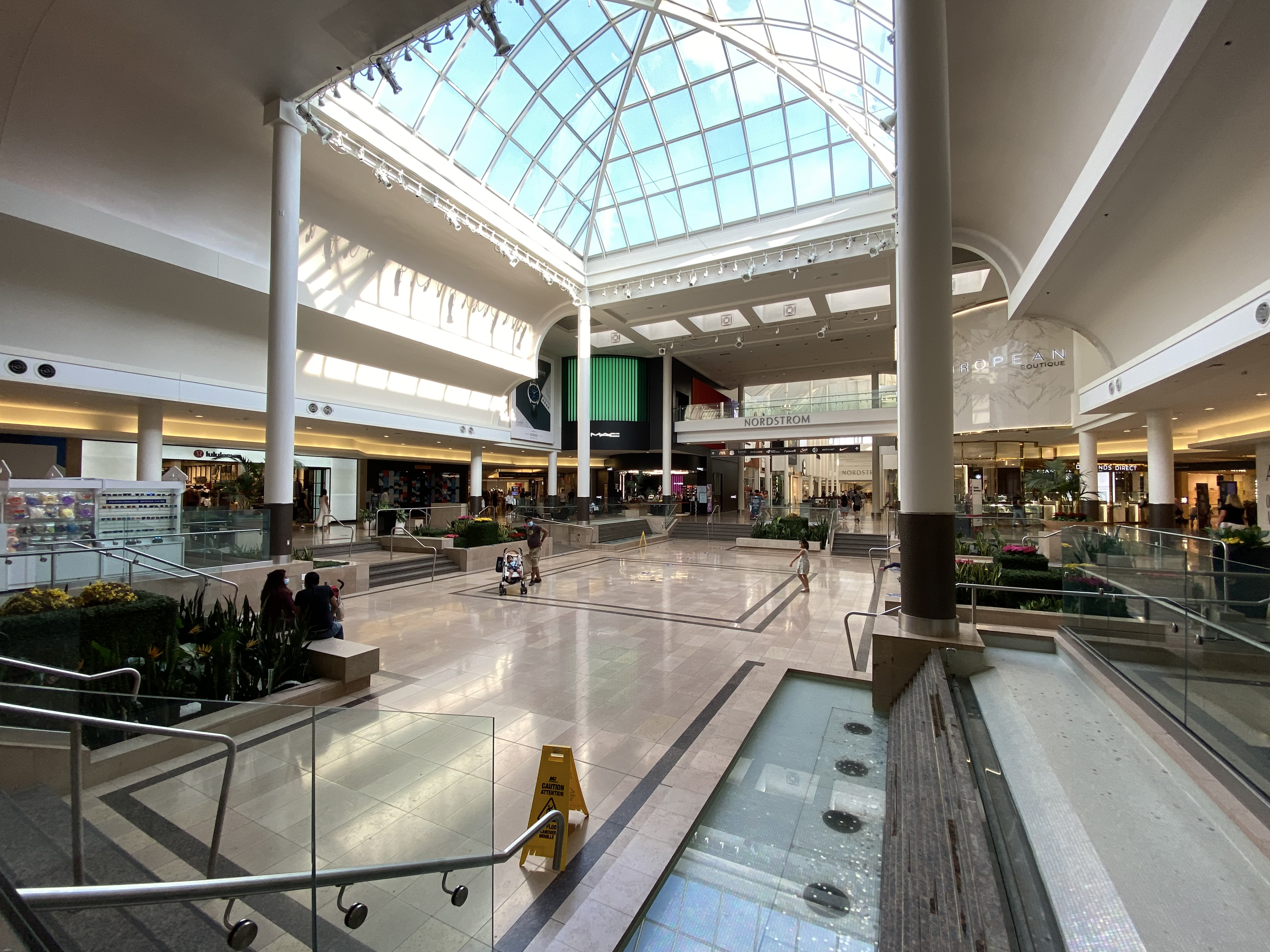
Shops at Sherway Gardens

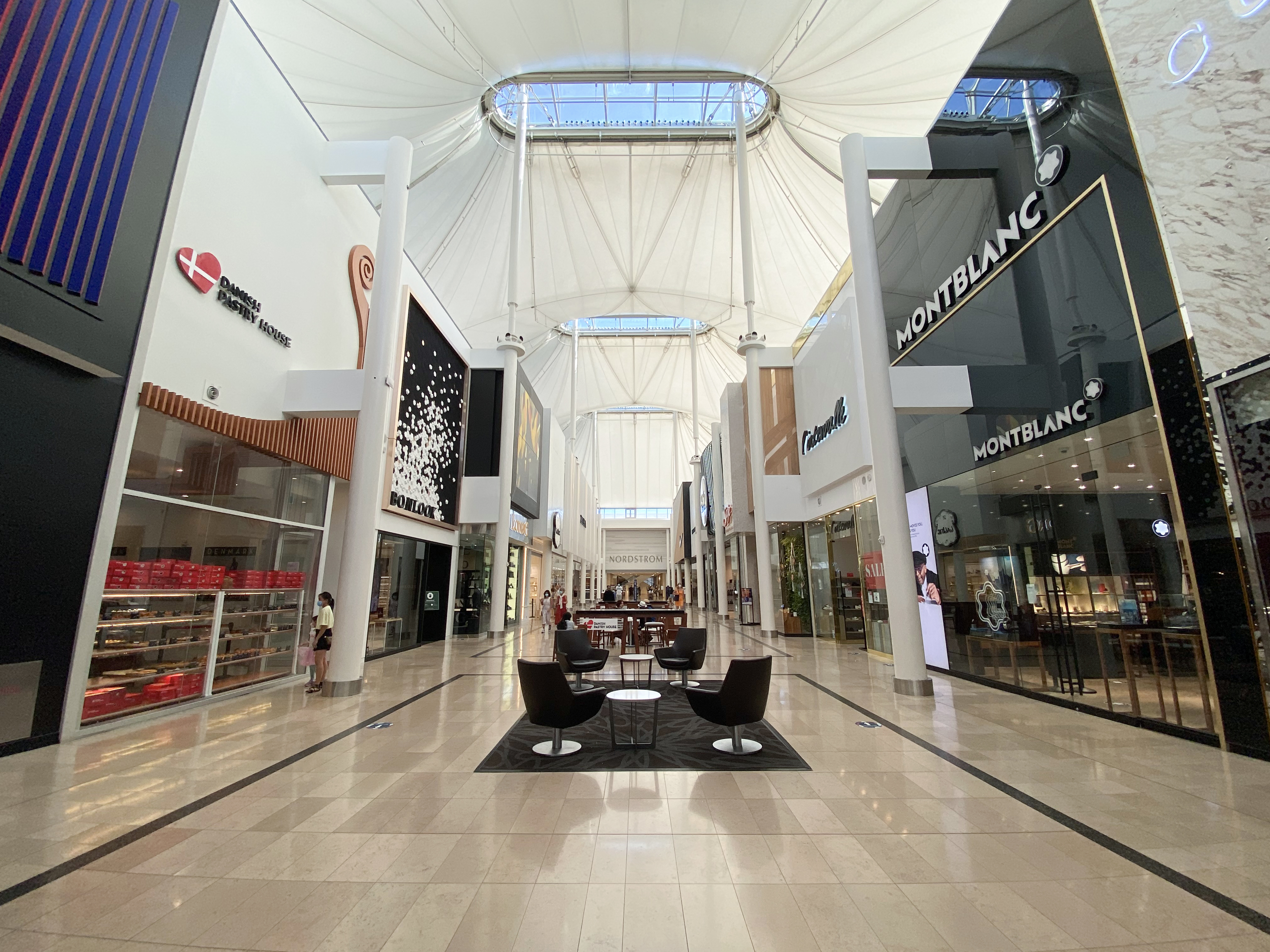
The original Gourmet Fair food court was demolished to make way for Nordstrom and several other shops

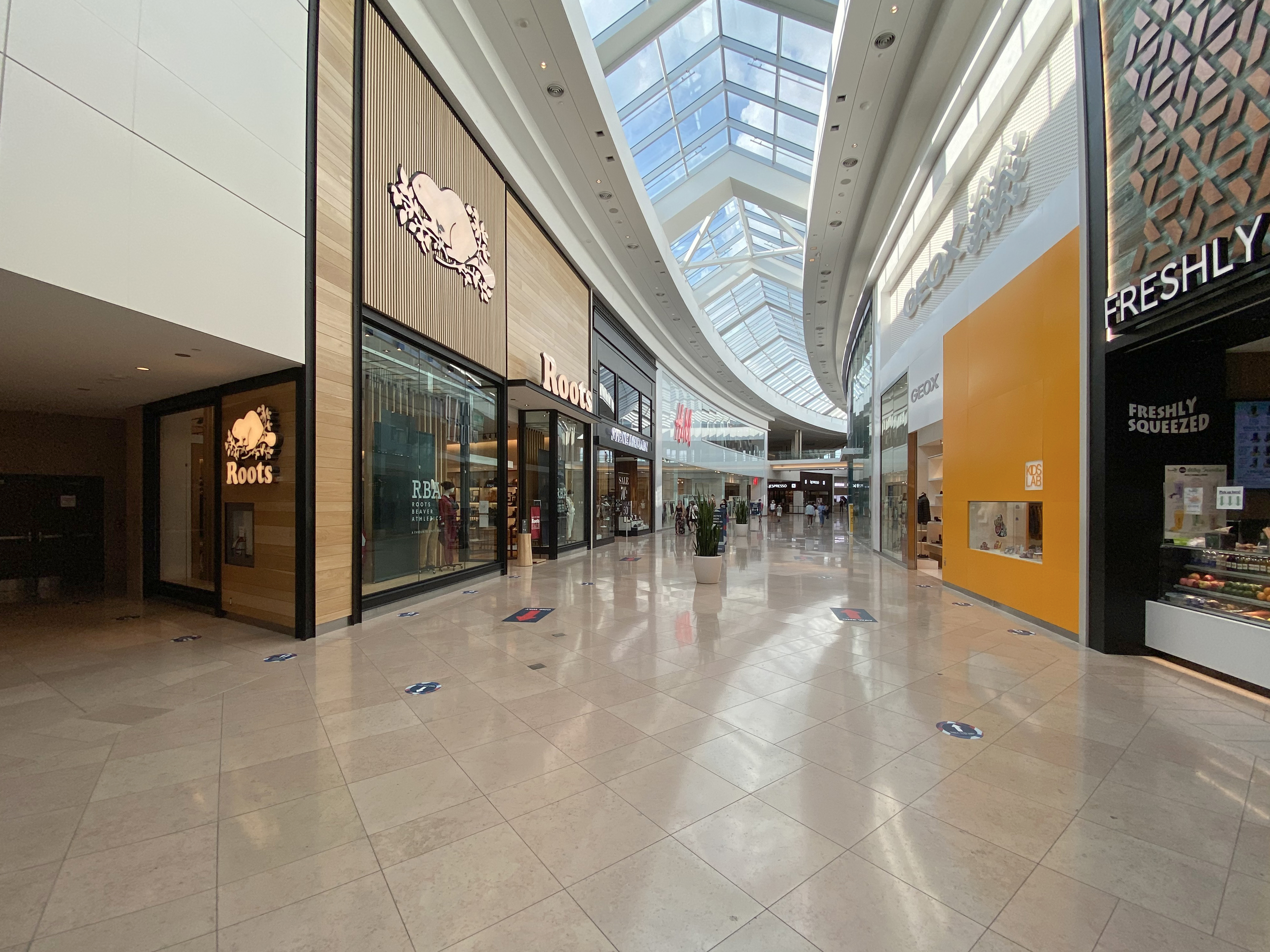
Expansion area of Sherway Gardens in 2021

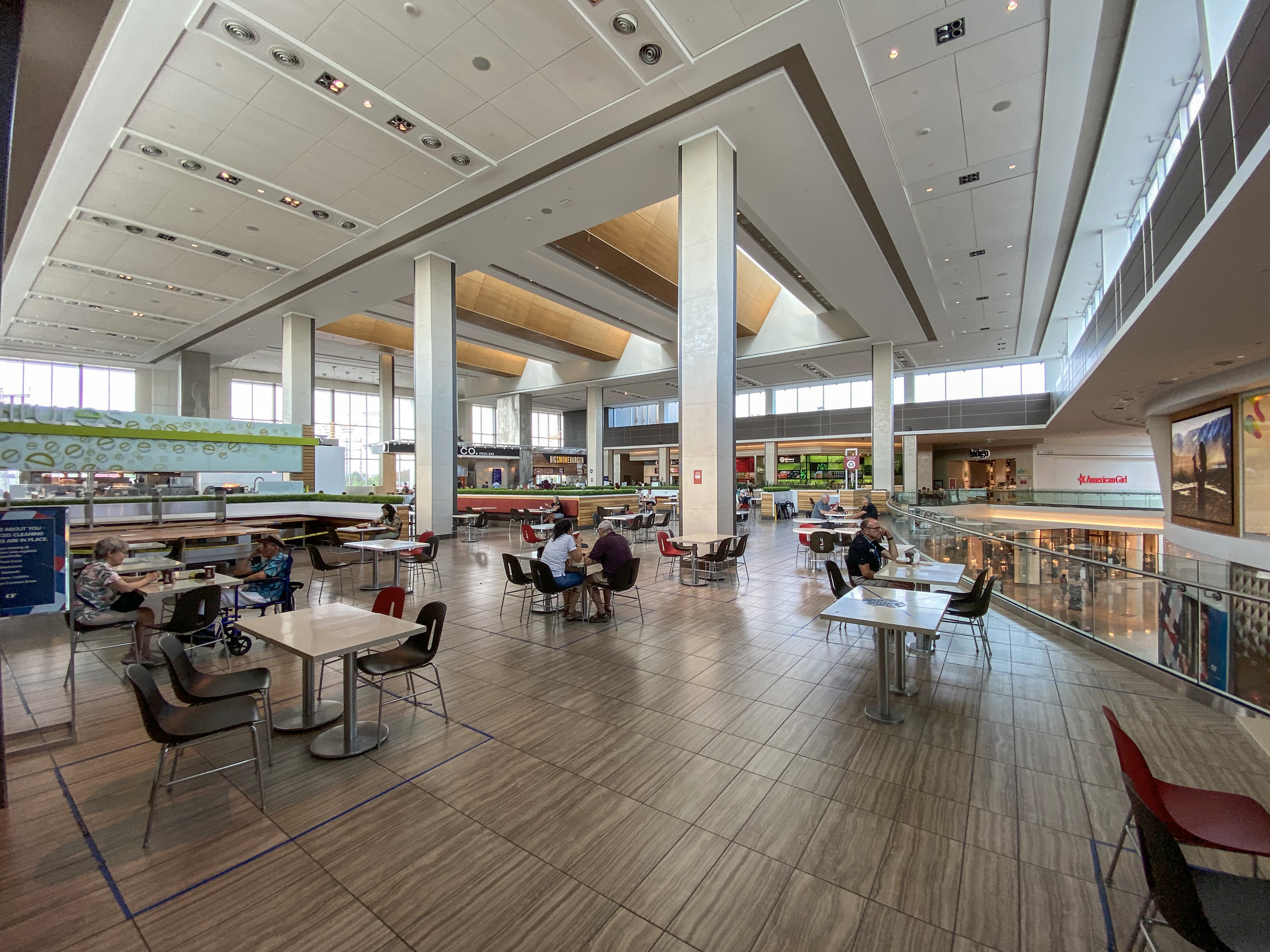
The new Gourmet Fare food court developed by Cadillac Fairview. It replaced the original Gourmet Fair developed by The Rouse Company that was demolished for Nordstrom and several other stores

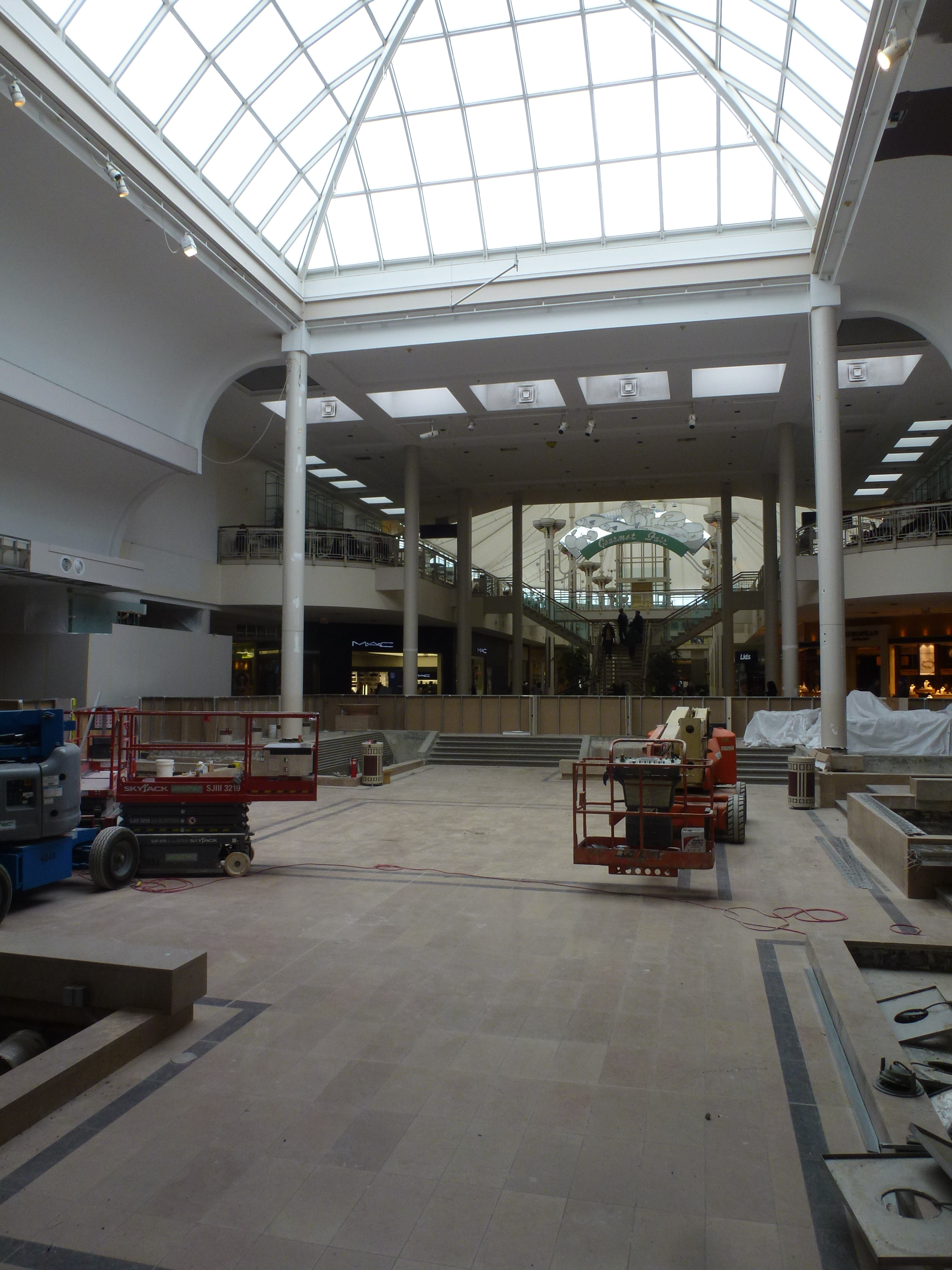
Demolition process of the original Gourmet Fair in 2014

== See also ==
- The Mills at Jersey Gardens
