= F. W. Woolworth Building (Toronto) =

Coordinates: 43.65259°N 79.379619°W

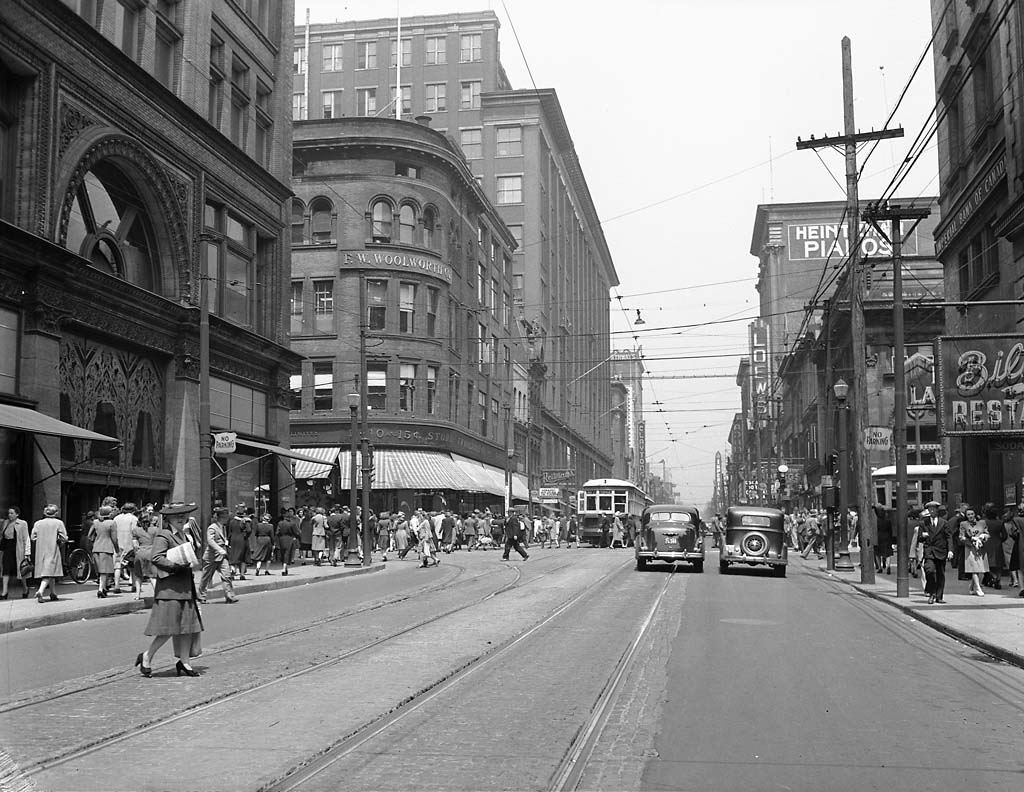
Woolworth's on the left corner in the 1930s.

The Jamieson Building (also known as the Woolworth building) was built in 1895 at the north-west corner of Queen Street West and Yonge Street in downtown Toronto. It is adjacent to the Toronto Eaton Centre. A distinctive feature of the building is the curved façade at its corner. Architects involved in the restoration would name the building after its address: 2 Queen West.

== History ==
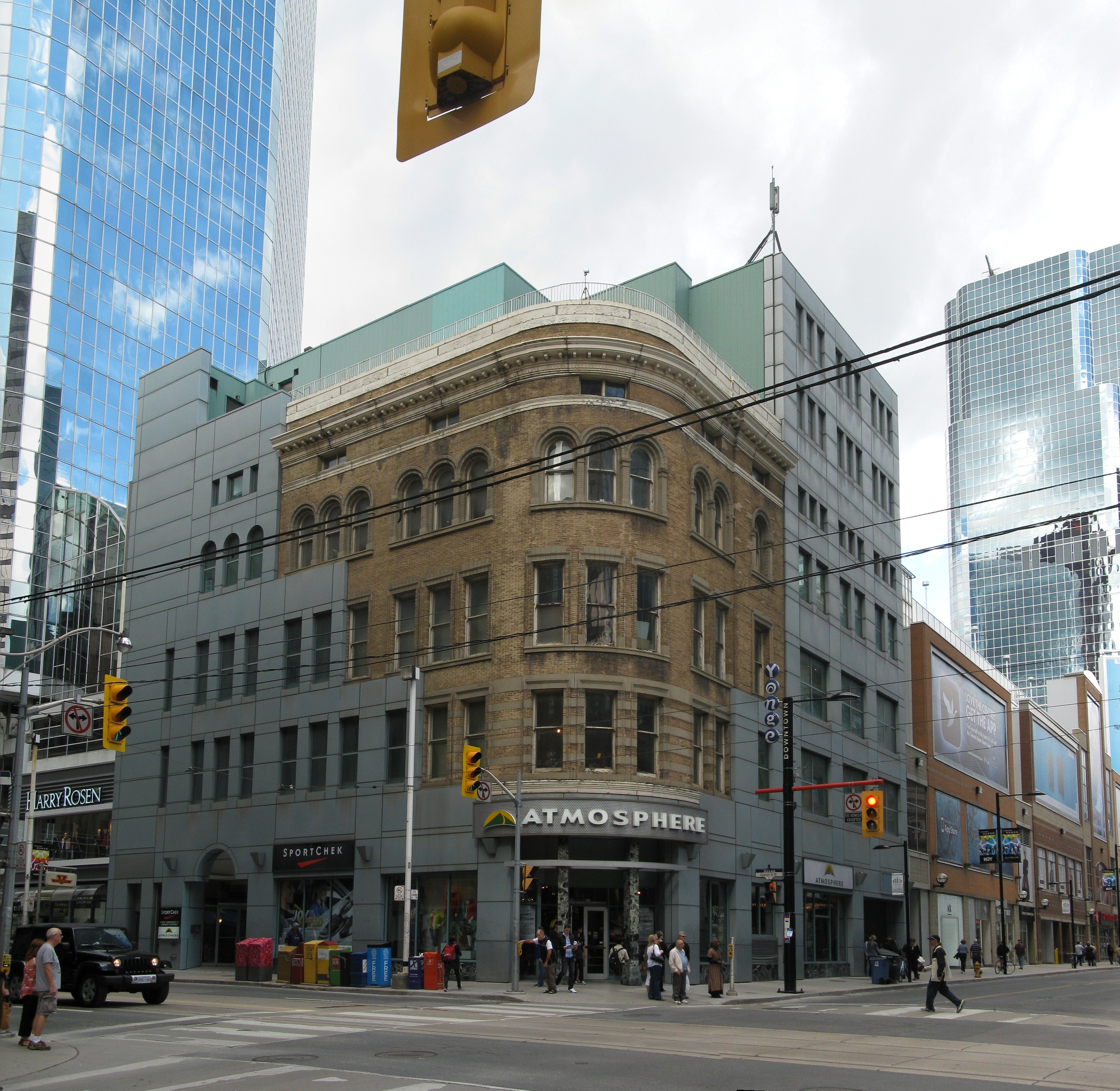
Former Woolworth Building in 2012

The north-west corner of Queen and Yonge Streets was once occupied by Elliot Thomas' Sun Tavern (1830–1850) then by Agricultural Hall (1850–1890), after which Philip Jamieson, a clothier and outfitter, opened a store on the site. In March 1895, a fire at the Simpson's store on the south side of Queen Street jumped over to Jamieson's destroying both stores. Jamieson commissioned architects Samuel Curry and Francis Baker to construct the current building in 1895. A distinctive feature of the Jamieson Building was "The Rounded Corner" which every advertisement for the Jamieson store would mention. Jamieson owned of the Jamieson Building until his death in 1909.

In 1912, Naomi Bilton was the owner of the land on which the building stands. Because of a dispute with the Eaton family, Bilton donated the property to the University of Toronto on condition that no Eaton would ever own it. Because of this condition, the property was excluded from the Eaton Centre development in the 1970s.

S.H. Knox and Company, an American Five and dime retailer occupied the building from 1910 to 1913. Frank and Charles Woolworth would merge their store with their cousin Knox to form F.W. Woolworth.

F.W. Woolworth, an American retailer, occupied the building from 1913 to 1976. After Woolworth took over the building, it covered the Philip Jamieson Clothing Company name which was etched in the brick façade. In the late 1960s, Woolworth's would dramatically alter the building by adding white cladding to the entire building hiding the original architecture.

Apparel Clearance Centre occupied the building in 1980 after an interior renovation. In 1985, the building was sold to Guaranty Realty Investments and Karas Corp. The joint owners commissioned architects Alter & Ireland to do a partial restoration of the façade where the white cladding from the 1960s was removed and partially replaced by gray panels leaving some of the original brickwork exposed.

The building was later home to several tenants including RBC bank branch, now defunct Tower Records Superstore, sports store Sport Chek (originally as Coast Mountain Sports then as Atmosphere) and gym GoodLife Fitness.

In 2018, Cadillac Fairview commissioned Zeidler Partnership Architects and ERA Architects to renovate the building. By that time, Cadillac Fairview had become the owner of the Jamieson Building.

== Restoration ==
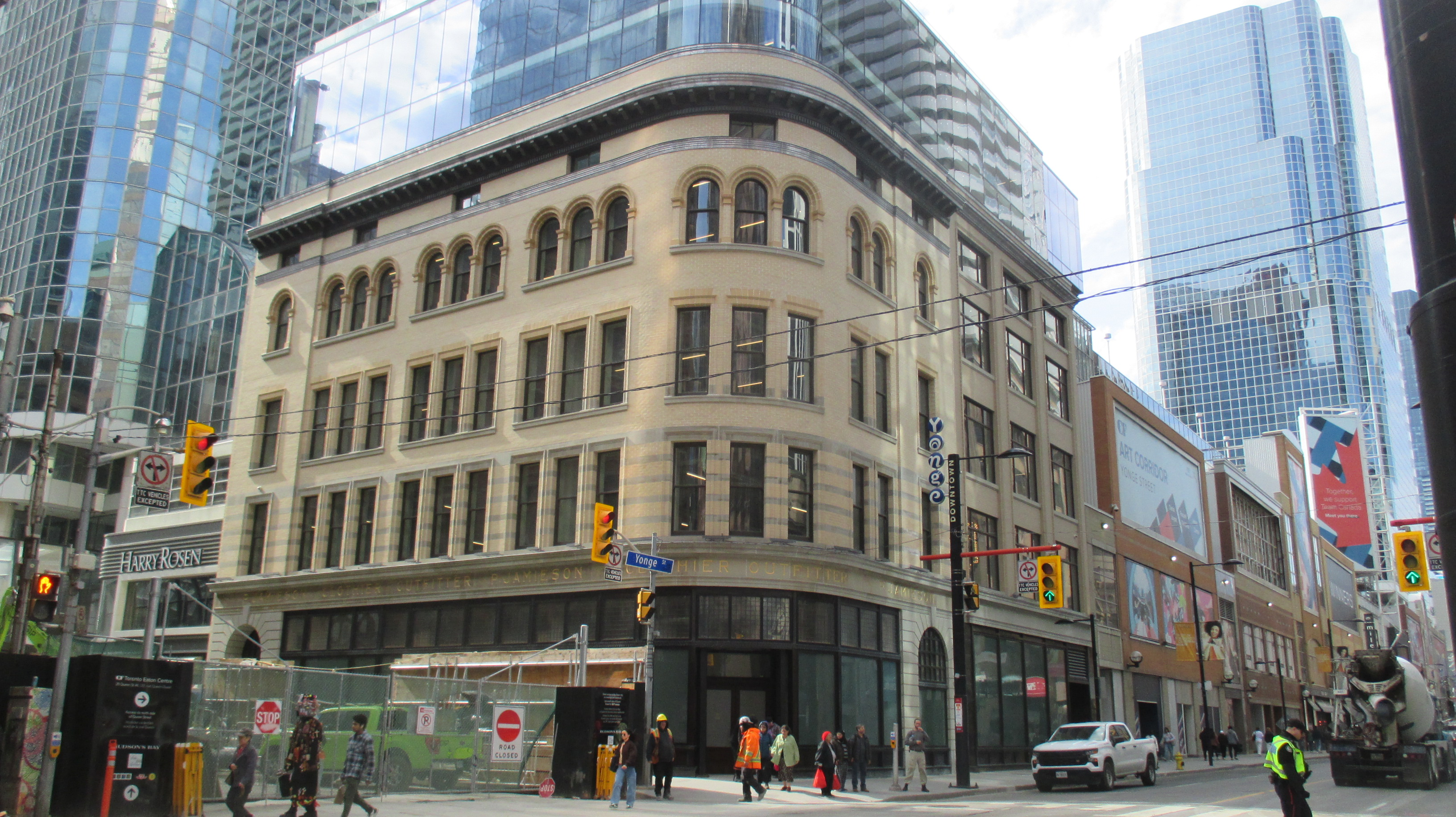
Jamieson Building largely restored to its 1895 appearance

In 2018, ERA Architects started work to restore the building to its late Victorian appearance. The façade had deteriorated to the point where much of it could not be saved. To rebuild it, more than 40,000 replica bricks, stone, and terra cotta pieces had to be used. The terra cotta replicas were made by Boston Valley Terra Cotta in Orchard Park, N.Y. modelled on a salvaged piece. Old photographs were used to recreate the metal cornice at the top of the fourth floor exterior. A gilded signage band just above the ground floor windows once again shows "P JAMIESON CLOTHIER OUTFITTER".

Zeidler Partnership Architects designed three new storeys to be added on top of the four original storeys, resulting in a seven-storey building. This will provide 2,151 m^{2} (23,150 sq ft) of office space and 2,044.9 m^{2} (22,011 sq ft) of retail and storage space. The first two storeys would contain retail space and would be part of the Eaton Centre. The third to sixth levels will be commercial office space. The seventh level is proposed to be restaurant space with a terrace overlooking the Yonge and Queen intersection. The fifth and sixth levels would be set back one metre from the original building's edge.

== See also ==
- List of oldest buildings and structures in Toronto
- List of Woolworth buildings
- Historic Woolworth's in Wilmington, Delaware
- Dominion Hotel, another heritage restoration in Toronto by ERA Architects
