= Ashley Tabor-King =

British businessman (born 1977)

Ashley Tabor-King CBE
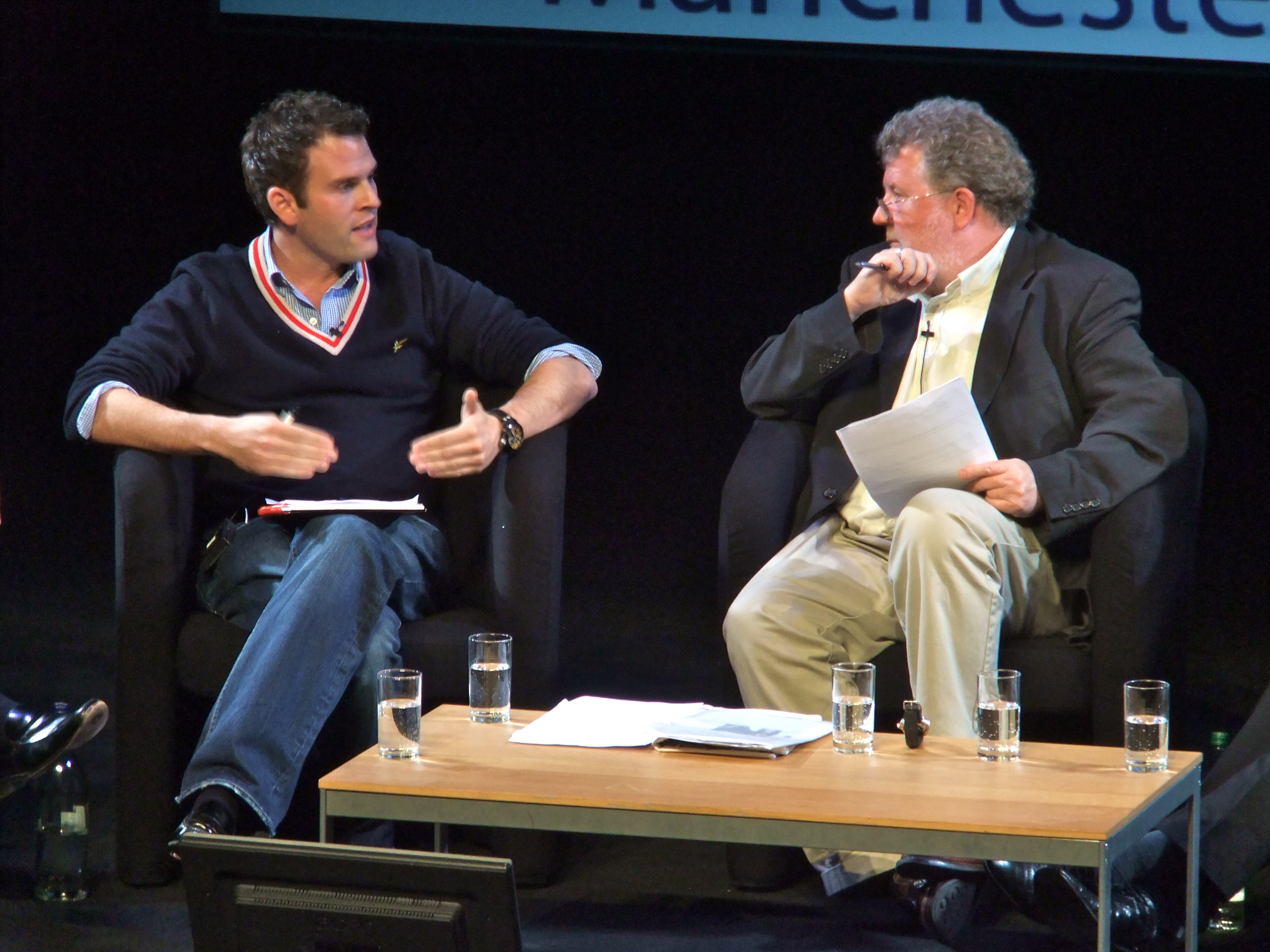
- Tabor-King (left) and Steve Hewlett in 2010
- Born: Ashley Daniel Tabor; May 1977 (age 49)
- Occupation: Businessman
- Title: Founder, executive president and owner of Global Media & Entertainment
- Spouse: George Tabor-King (m. 2019)
- Children: 3
- Parents: Michael Tabor; Doreen Tabor

Ashley Daniel Tabor-King (né Tabor; born May 1977) is a British businessman who is the founder and executive president of Global Media & Entertainment, the largest commercial radio group in Europe and one of the leading outdoor (OOH) advertising companies in the UK.

== Early life ==
Ashley Daniel Tabor-King was born to a Jewish family in May 1977, the son of Doreen and Michael Tabor, who made his fortune through bookmaking, horse breeding and property.

== Career ==
Tabor-King presented and ran a hospital radio station in Watford while still at school. He left school at 16, and his first job in commercial radio was as an overnight tech op at the then Chiltern Radio in Dunstable.

He later worked as an assistant to Richard Park at Capital Radio in London, helping him to produce shows and plan playlists.

Tabor-King once worked for Simon Cowell, and is credited as being one of the co-writers of The X Factor's theme song.

In 2008, with cash provided by his father and other lenders, he took over GCap Radio, the group behind Capital Radio and Classic FM, and founded Global.

In 2016, Global launched a new school, Global Academy, to prepare young people aged 14–18 for a career in broadcast and digital media, to help reduce the barriers to entry for young people entering the media industry. On 20 April 2017, the Academy was officially opened by the Duke of Cambridge and Prince Harry in their capacity as patrons of "Heads Together", a mental health charity. Two breakfast shows from Global radio stations were broadcasting live from the Academy: Heart London Breakfast with Jamie Theakston, and Emma Bunton and Nick Ferrari on LBC.

== Honours ==
Tabor-King was appointed Officer of the Order of the British Empire (OBE) in the 2017 Birthday Honours and Commander of the Order of the British Empire (CBE) in the 2024 New Year Honours for services to media and entertainment.

== Personal life ==
Tabor-King is married to George Tabor-King. Tabor-King has lived in The Knightsbridge Apartments complex since 2006, in an apartment he bought for £15 million. In 2017 he bought the next-door apartment for £90 million.
