= Beth Israel Synagogue (Peterborough, Ontario) =

Synagogue in Peterborough, Ontario

Religion
- Affiliation: Judaism
- Rite: Conservative/Unaffiliated
- Leadership: Cantor
- Status: Active

Location
- Location: 775 Weller Street; Peterborough, Ontario; K9J 6Y7
- Interactive map of Beth Israel Synagogue (Peterborough, Ontario)
- Coordinates: 44.30176°N 78.34442°W

Architecture
- Architect: Eberhard Zeidler
- Completed: 1964

Website
- jccpeterborough.com

The Beth Israel Synagogue is a synagogue in Peterborough, Ontario, Canada.

== History ==
According to Canadian census documents, there have been Jews in Peterborough since 1811, with numbers climbing slowly but surely: to 29 people identifying as Jewish in 1911, 136 (out of a total Peterborough population of 25,350) in 1921, and to 256 Jewish people in 1961. The Jewish population has remained relatively steady since that time, with the 2001 national census showing over 300 Jews in Peterborough. Today, the Congregation Beth Israel includes about 35 participating families who live in Peterborough and surrounding areas.

In 1911, with the community growing, a committee formed to seek a man to serve as Schochet, teacher and Chazan. They found and hired Philip Black who "with great zeal and dedication began to build the spiritual life of the Jewish Community". From the early 1900s until as late as 1940, a system was in place whereby money was collected (at first 50 cents per family per week) to pay the Schochet. Black served for two years, married, and, with the community being unable to support a full-time professional, Black took up as a merchant, while continuing as an active member of the Jewish community. Families active in Jewish Community life in Peterborough around the turn of the last century onward included (but were certainly not limited to) Blacks, Florences, Lows, Swartzes, Sukoffs, Zacks, and Cherneys, Greens, and Fines.

In the earliest days of Jewish community life, services took place in homes, with public space being rented for High Holiday services. In 1922, the community leased a house (where the Schohet lived), with a hall on the second floor, located on Water Street. In 1928, with the growth of the community, the Hadassah Chapter began raising money for a synagogue.

In 1933, a house owned by the late Abraham Swartz on Aylmer Street was purchased and remodeled into a synagogue. It was then that the name of the Peterborough Jewish Society was changed to Congregation Beth Israel. Peterborough's Jewish population increased during World War II, and in 1945 the congregation moved to a larger centre on Reid Street that had formerly served as a Methodist Sunday School building. The current building on Weller Street was constructed in 1964, and inaugurated with much celebration and fanfare, winning an architectural award for Eb Zeidler, who later went on to design Toronto's Eaton Centre and other major works. In 2004, Beth Israel reached an agreement to share the building with the Unitarian Fellowship of Peterborough.

== Affiliation ==
The Beth Israel Synagogue moved toward holding egalitarian services in the early 2000s. Its website notes that, while Jewish services in Peterborough have traditionally been Orthodox, the membership voted unanimously to adopt an egalitarian and "Conservative type" service in 2004. The Canadian Jewish Congress describes the synagogue as "Conservative/Unaffiliated" as of 2010.
