= Living Arts Centre =

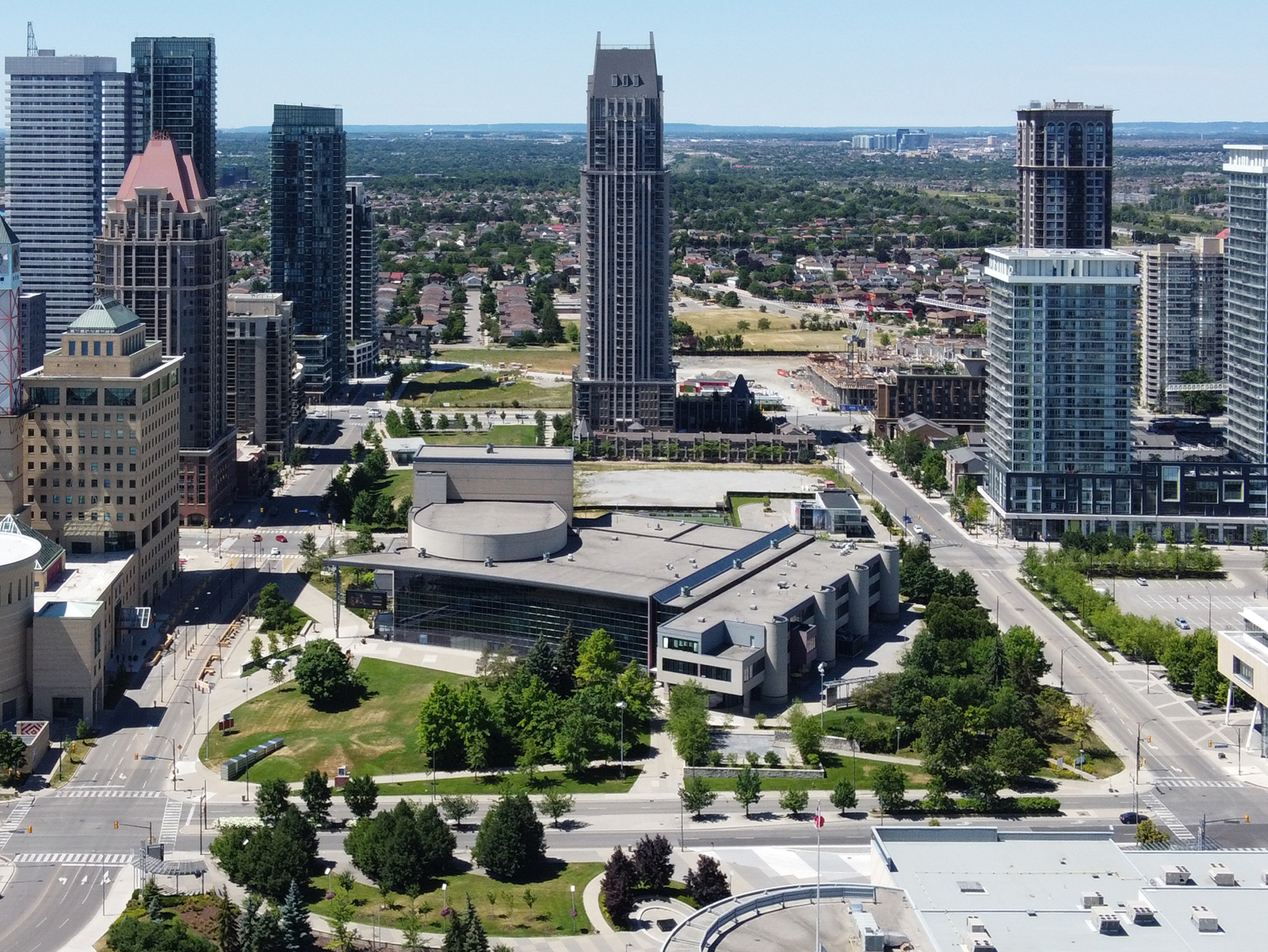
- Interactive map of the Living Arts Centre area

General information
- Type: Performing Arts Centre / Live Events
- Architectural style: Modern
- Location: Mississauga, Ontario, Canada, 4141 Living Arts Drive, Mississauga, Ontario, Mississauga, Canada
- Coordinates: 43.589604°N 79.64617°W
- Completed: 1997
- Inaugurated: 1997
- Owner: City of Mississauga

Technical details
- Floor count: 5

Design and construction
- Architecture firm: Zeidler Partnership Architects, Toronto
- Main contractor: PCL Constructors Canada Incorporated, Toronto

Other information
- Seating type: Fixed Flip Up / Soft Seating
- Seating capacity: 1300; 400; 110

Website
- www.livingartscentre.ca/home

The Living Arts Centre is a 225,000 ft^{2} (20,900 m^{2}) multi-use facility which opened in Mississauga, Ontario, Canada, on October 7, 1997. The complex houses three theatres for the performing arts, Hammerson Hall, RBC Theatre and Rogers Theatre), an exhibition gallery (the Laidlaw Hall), seven art studios and facilities for corporate meetings.

The Living Arts Centre was designed by the Zeidler Partnership, who were awarded an Award of Merit in the City of Mississauga Urban Design Awards in 1998 for the complex. The building was funded by donations by corporate, community and individual sponsors, as well as the City of Mississauga and the Government of Canada.

Glass artist Stuart Reid designed a piece made of etched and enameled glass, blown by mouth, for the main foyer titled "Dance of Venus", which won an international competition. It measures 30 ft (9.1 m) by 150 ft (46 m).

Hammerson Hall is the larger of the two theatres, providing tiered concert seating for 1300 people, while the RBC Theatre has a flexible seating arrangement, allowing for cabaret-style seating at tables or up to 400 people for theatre performances. The complex also includes a 110-seat lecture style space known as the Rogers Theatre, a variety of meeting rooms, rehearsal space and an on-site Food & Beverage department.

A range of exhibitions, events and performances are hosted by both the Living Arts Centre and community partners, including the Mississauga Choral Society, Mississauga Symphony Orchestra, Mississauga International Children`s Festival, and several resident artists occupy the studio spaces. The centre has averaged over 400,000 visitors each year.
