= 10 Lancelot Place =

General information
- Type: Residential
- Location: 10 Lancelot Place, Knightsbridge, London, England
- Coordinates: 51.5006°N 0.1636°W

Design and construction
- Architect: Zeidler Partnership Architects

10 Lancelot Place is a residential building in Knightsbridge, London.

== Location ==
It is in Lancelot Place. It is part of Knightsbridge Estates.

== History ==
The building was designed by Zeidler Partnership Architects. Built with red bricks and Portland stones, it was completed in 2008.

From the penthouse, there is a vista of the Royal Albert Hall, the Natural History Museum, Harrods, Hyde Park.
