= Eberhard Zeidler (architect) =

German-Canadian architect (1926–2022)

Eberhard Zeidler OC OOnt
- Born: Eberhard Heinrich Zeidler; January 11, 1926; Braunsdorf, Thuringia, Germany
- Died: January 7, 2022 (aged 95); Toronto, Ontario, Canada
- Occupation: Architect
- Practice: Zeidler Partnership Architects
- Buildings: Ontario Place; Toronto Eaton Centre

Eberhard Heinrich Zeidler, OC OOnt (January 11, 1926 – January 7, 2022) was a German-Canadian architect. He designed iconic structures and landmarks in Canada and internationally, most notably in Toronto. These included Ontario Place, the Toronto Eaton Centre and the Meridian Arts Centre, as well as redevelopments of Queen's Quay Terminal and the Gladstone Hotel. His firm also designed Canada Place in Vancouver for Expo 86.

== Early life ==
Zeidler was born in Braunsdorf, Germany, on January 11, 1926. He served in the German navy during World War II. He was instructed under the influence of the Bauhaus school in Weimar and the Technische Hochschule Karlsruhe. He fled East Germany and worked in the office established by Emanuel Lindner, his former professor. There, he constructed several factories and medical buildings. Zeidler subsequently immigrated to Canada in 1951.

== Career ==
Zeidler first joined an architectural firm with Blackwell and Craig in Peterborough, Ontario. He later relocated to Toronto in 1963 and worked for the firm, which became Craig, Zeidler and Strong until 1975. One of the essential elements of his early works is his employment of striking interior atrium space, which became widespread on an international level during the 1970s. Moreover, his experience in the Bauhaus school made him familiar with the technological matters in building design. These included structural and mechanical services (most notably, exposed air-handling ducts), as well as aspects that ease movement and communication. This was exemplified in the McMaster University Health Science Centre, his breakthrough project, which was meant to resemble a large construction set for children. The building utilized regular geometric building modules, coupled with glazed service and circulation towers, internally exposed steel trusses, ducts, and an automated materials delivery system.

Most of Zeidler's structures were public buildings. He envisaged Toronto Eaton Centre – which opened on February 10, 1977 – to be an "interior street" instead of being simply a shopping mall. Two of the structures his firm designed for the University of Maryland Medical System in Baltimore were meant to connect the passing from the 20th to the 21st century. His later projects incorporated elements pertaining to sustainable development. For instance, the Student Learning Centre at Ryerson University (2015) featured a green roof and energy efficient lighting on the exterior. Likewise, The Bow in downtown Calgary employed an energy efficient glass facade, interior atria, and roof gardens. Zeidler rarely designed private residences, drawing up approximately 20 in his career, most notably the four-storey home in Rosedale that he constructed for his family during the late 1960s.

Zeidler officially retired in 2009, but continued to go to work daily as a senior partner emeritus at the firm, now called Zeidler Partnership Architects, in Toronto. The firm also has offices in Calgary, Victoria, BC, London, Berlin, Beijing, and Abu Dhabi. He also taught at the University of Toronto as a visiting lecturer and critic, before working as an adjunct professor from 1983 to 1995. He and his wife started a scholarship to assist architecture students at the university. Zeidler published his autobiography, Buildings Cities Life, in 2013.

== Awards and honours ==
Zeidler was appointed an officer of the Order of Canada in June 1984 and invested four months later in October. He has also received the Order of Ontario that same year. He was conferred the gold medal of the Royal Architectural Institute of Canada and became a recipient of the Governor General's Medal in Architecture for the project of Queen's Quay Terminal in 1986. Three years later, he was granted an honorary Doctor of Architecture by the University of Toronto. Zeidler was the recipient of the Queen Elizabeth II Golden Jubilee Medal (2002) and the Queen Elizabeth II Diamond Jubilee Medal (2012). The library and family reading room in the Daniels Building – housing the John H. Daniels Faculty of Architecture, Landscape and Design at the University of Toronto – is named in his honour.

== Personal life ==
Zeidler married Jane Zeidler in 1957. They met while he was working in Peterborough, and remained married until his death. Together, they had four children: Katie, Robert, Margie, and Christina.

Zeidler died on January 7, 2022, in Toronto. He was 95 years old, and was four days shy of his 96th birthday and nineteen days shy of his 65th wedding anniversary.

== Portfolio ==
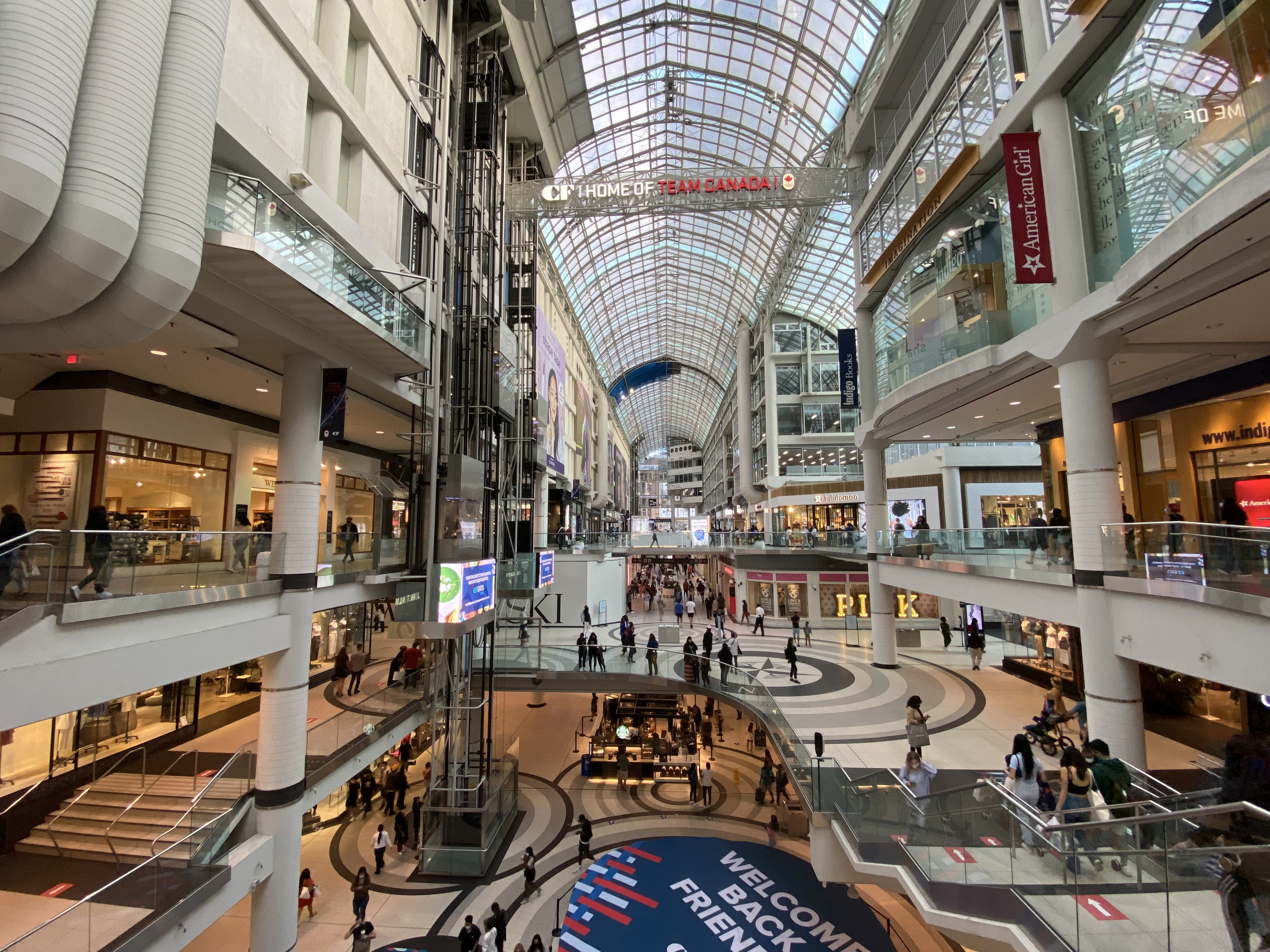
Interior of the Eaton Centre in downtown Toronto, designed by E. H. Zeidler.

Prominent projects by Zeidler's firm include:

- Toronto Eaton Centre shopping mall and offices, 1977–1981 with Bregman + Hamann Architects, Toronto, Ontario
- McMaster University Health Science Centre, 1972, Hamilton, Ontario
- Ontario Place theme park (including Cinesphere), 1967–1971, Toronto
- Walter C. Mackenzie Health Sciences Centre, 1975–1986, Edmonton, Alberta
- Yerba Buena Gardens, 1980–1984, San Francisco, California
- Queen's Quay Terminal Redevelopment, 1979–1983, Toronto
- The Gallery at Harborplace, 1987–2022, Baltimore
- Sherway Gardens 1989 expansion
- Canada Place for Expo 86, Vancouver, British Columbia
- MediaPark, 1990–2004, Cologne, Germany
- Raymond F. Kravis Center for the Performing Arts, 1992, West Palm Beach, Florida
- North York Performing Arts Centre, 1993, North York, Ontario
- Living Arts Centre, 1997, Mississauga, Ontario
- Hospital for Sick Children Atrium, 1993, Toronto
- Beth Israel Synagogue, Peterborough, 1964
- Rogers Office Campus, 1992, Toronto
- Sherway Gardens Phase IV, 1989–1990, Toronto
- Gladstone Hotel restoration, 2002–2003, Toronto
- Trump International Hotel and Tower, 2012, Toronto

== Bibliography ==
- Zeidler, Eberhard (September 21, 2013). Buildings Cities Life: An Autobiography in Architecture. Dundurn. ISBN 9781459704138.
