= Zeidler Architecture =

Zeidler Architecture Inc.
- Type: Private
- Industry: Architecture
- Founded: 1954
- Services: Architecture, Interior Design, Urban Design, and Master Planning
- Website: www.zeidler.com

Zeidler Architecture Inc. is a national architecture, interior design, urban design, and master planning firm with four Canadian offices located in Toronto, Calgary, Vancouver, and Victoria.

Architect Eberhard Zeidler joined W. & W.R.L. Blackwell and Craig, a firm led by Blackwell Jr. and partner Craig, in 1951. The firm, originally founded by William Blackwell in 1880 in Peterborough, was renamed Blackwell, Craig and Zeidler Architects in 1954. The practice relocated to Toronto in 1961. Senior partner emeritus, Eberhard Zeidler, stepped down from Zeidler Partnership Architects in 2009. Rebranded in 2017, Zeidler Architecture Inc. is now led by a national senior leadership of 11 partners, with over 160 team members across Canada.

The firm's main body of work is located in Canada, with some projects in the United States, Europe, the Middle East, Germany and Asia.

== Notable projects ==
- 10 Lancelot Place in Knightsbridge, London, UK
- Assuta Medical Center, Tel Aviv, Israel
- Block 2 Parliamentary Precinct Redevelopment (excludes the Indigenous_Peoples_Space at 100 Wellington Street) with David Chipperfield Architects, Ottawa, Ontario
- The Bow, Calgary, Alberta
- Brampton Civic Offices (Bramalea / Chinguacousy Civic Centre) and Southwest Renewal, Brampton, Ontario
- Baltimore Center (The Gallery) at Harborplace – Baltimore, Maryland
- Calgary City Centre, Calgary, Alberta
- Camrose Performing Arts Centre, Camrose, Alberta
- Canada Place, Vancouver, British Columbia
- Canadian Diplomatic Complex, Seoul, South Korea 2007
- St. Joseph's Health Centre West 5th Campus, St. Joseph's Hamilton, Ontario
- Juravinski Hospital and Cancer Centre, Hamilton, Ontario
- Living Arts Centre, Mississauga, Ontario
- McMaster University Health Sciences Centre, Hamilton, Ontario
- Minto Midtown, Toronto, Ontario
- Mohawk College Cummings Library and Collaboratory, Hamilton, Ontario
- Mount Allison University Purdy Crawford Centre for the Arts, Sackville, New Brunswick
- Ontario Place, Toronto, Ontario
- Ontario Science Centre OMNIMAX Cinema & Renovations, Toronto, Ontario
- Orangutans of Gunung Leuser, Guardians of the Rainforest Habitat, with Jones and Jones Architects + Landscape Architects, Toronto Zoo, Toronto, Ontario
- Peel Memorial Hospital, Brampton, Ontario
- Place Montreal Trust, Montreal, Quebec
- Princess Margaret Hospital / Ontario Cancer Institute, Toronto, Ontario
- Queen's Quay Terminal, Toronto, Ontario
- Rogers Building, Toronto, Ontario
- The Rudy Adlaf Bridge, CF Toronto Eaton Centre, with WilkonsonEyre, Toronto, Ontario
- Toronto Metropolitan University Sheldon & Tracy Levy Student Learning Centre with Snøhetta, Toronto, Ontario
- Scripps Research Institute, Palm Beach County, Florida, USA
- The Hospital for Sick Children Atrium, Toronto, Ontario
- Toronto Eaton Centre, Toronto, Ontario
- Torre Mayor, Mexico City, Mexico
- St. Regis Hotel, Trump International Hotel and Tower (Toronto), Toronto, Ontario
- Union Station Revitalization, GO Trainshed Glass Roof, Toronto, Ontario
- Toronto South Detention Centre, Toronto, Ontario
- F. W. Woolworth Building (Toronto) restoration as 2 Queen

== Awards ==
- 2022 RAIC National Urban Design Awards, Award of Merit, Urban Fragments – CF Toronto Eaton Centre Bridge
- 2021 Association of Registered Interior Designers of Ontario (ARIDO), Distinct Category – McCrum's Office Furnishings
- 2020 Canadian Architect Award of Excellence – Taza Water Reservoir
- 2018 Heritage BC, Outstanding Achievement Award – Promis Block Seismic Upgrade
- 2011 Canadian Architect Award of Excellence – Toronto Metropolitan University Student Learning Centre
- 2010 Ontario Association of Architects Landmark Award – Queen's Quay Terminal
- 2010 International Academy of Health & Design Award Commendation – Assuta Medical Centre
- 2009 Ontario Association of Architects Design Excellence Award – Belleville Public Library and John M. Parrott Art Gallery
- 2009 Ontario Association of Architects Landmark Award – St. Lawrence Neighbourhood 1977-82
- 2009 American Institute of Architects, Austin Honor Award – Long Center for the Performing Arts
- 2008 Ontario Association of Architects Landmark Award – Toronto Eaton Centre
- 2008 AIPC Apex Award – World's Best Convention Centre – Canada Place
- 2008 American Institute of Architects (Eastern New York) - Design Honor Award - St. Joseph's Hamilton West 5th Campus
- 2008 Canadian Society of Landscape Architects, National Honour Award - Canadian Diplomatic Complex
- 2006 Design Exchange Interior Design Commercial - York University Accolade
- 2006 Canadian Urban Institute Brownie Award, Best Large Scale Project - Halifax Seawall Redevelopment Master Plan
- 2005 Canadian Urban Institute Brownie Award, Brownie Awards Finalist (Green Design and Technological Innovation) – Canada Marine Discovery Centre
- 2001 Canadian Architect Award of Excellence – Canada Place, Canary Wharf
- 1999 Ontario Association of Architects Architectural Excellence Award – National Trade Centre at Exhibition Place
- 1997 Governor General's Medal Award of Merit – Columbus Center of Marine Research and Exploration
