= Hudson's Bay Queen Street =

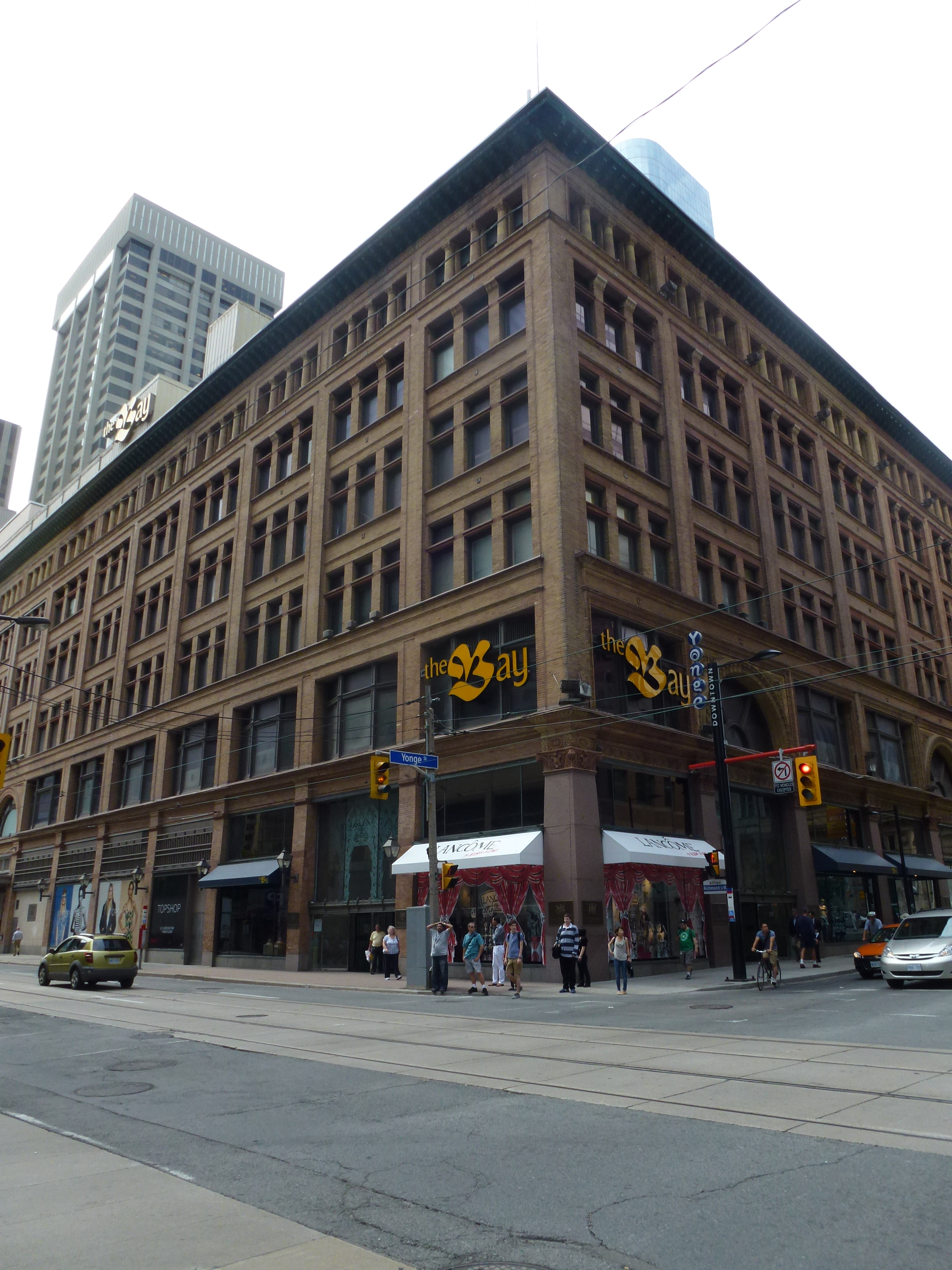
- The Hudson's Bay department store in 2013
- Former names: Simpson's Department Store; The Bay Queen Street

General information
- Architectural style: Neo-Romanesque
- Location: 176 Yonge Street, Toronto, Ontario, Canada
- Coordinates: 43°39′07″N 79°22′46″W
- Opened: 1896; 130 years ago (Simpsons); 1991; 35 years ago (Hudson's Bay); 2016; 10 years ago (Saks Fifth Avenue)
- Renovated: 1907; 1923; 1929; 2014–2016
- Closed: 1991; 35 years ago (Simpsons); June 1, 2025; 17 months ago (Hudson's Bay and Saks Fifth Avenue)
- Client: Robert Simpson
- Owner: Cadillac Fairview

Technical details
- Floor count: 8
- Floor area: 70,000 square metres (750,000 sq ft) of selling space

Design and construction
- Architecture firm: Burke and Horwood

Ontario Heritage Act
- Designated: 1976

Hudson's Bay Queen Street (originally the Simpson's flagship store) is a department store building on Yonge Street in downtown Toronto, Ontario, Canada. It was designed by the Burke and Horwood architecture firm for Robert Simpson, and opened in 1896; it replaced the first store on the grounds founded in 1894, which burned down in 1895. In 1976, the building was designated as protected under the Ontario Heritage Act. It was the flagship store of the Simpsons department store chain, was acquired by the Hudson's Bay Company in 1978, and was converted to The Bay flagship store in 1991.

The Hudson's Bay flagship store spanned 70,000 square metres (750,000 sq ft) of selling space, making it one of the largest department stores in Canada. HBC sold the building to Cadillac Fairview and officially became part of the Toronto Eaton Centre in 2014, although the two buildings have been connected by skybridge since the 1970s.

The store officially closed on June 1, 2025. The complex connects to the nearby Bay Adelaide Centre, Queen Station and shared underground parking complex.

== History ==
=== 1895–1991: Simpsons ===
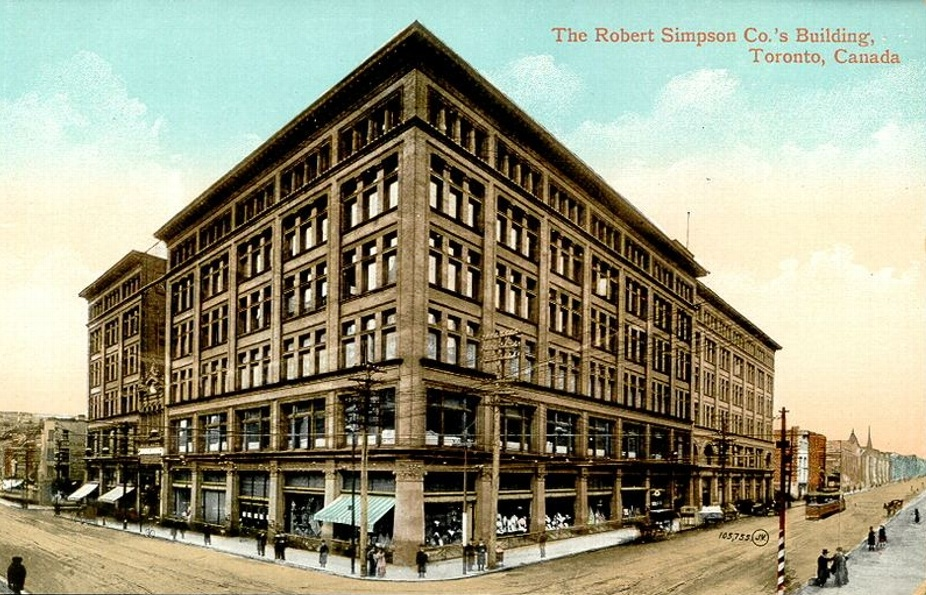
Simpson's Department Store c. 1908

The 1896 sandstone building located on Queen Street slightly west of Yonge Street was built by Toronto firm of Burke and Horwood for Simpson's Department Store in the Romanesque Revival style with Chicago School influences. The fireproof steel frame structure replaced the original 6-storey store that burned in 1895 just three-months after opening. The store was built to replace the original Simpson's dry goods business at 184 Yonge Street and was located directly across from rival retailer's Eaton's Annex.

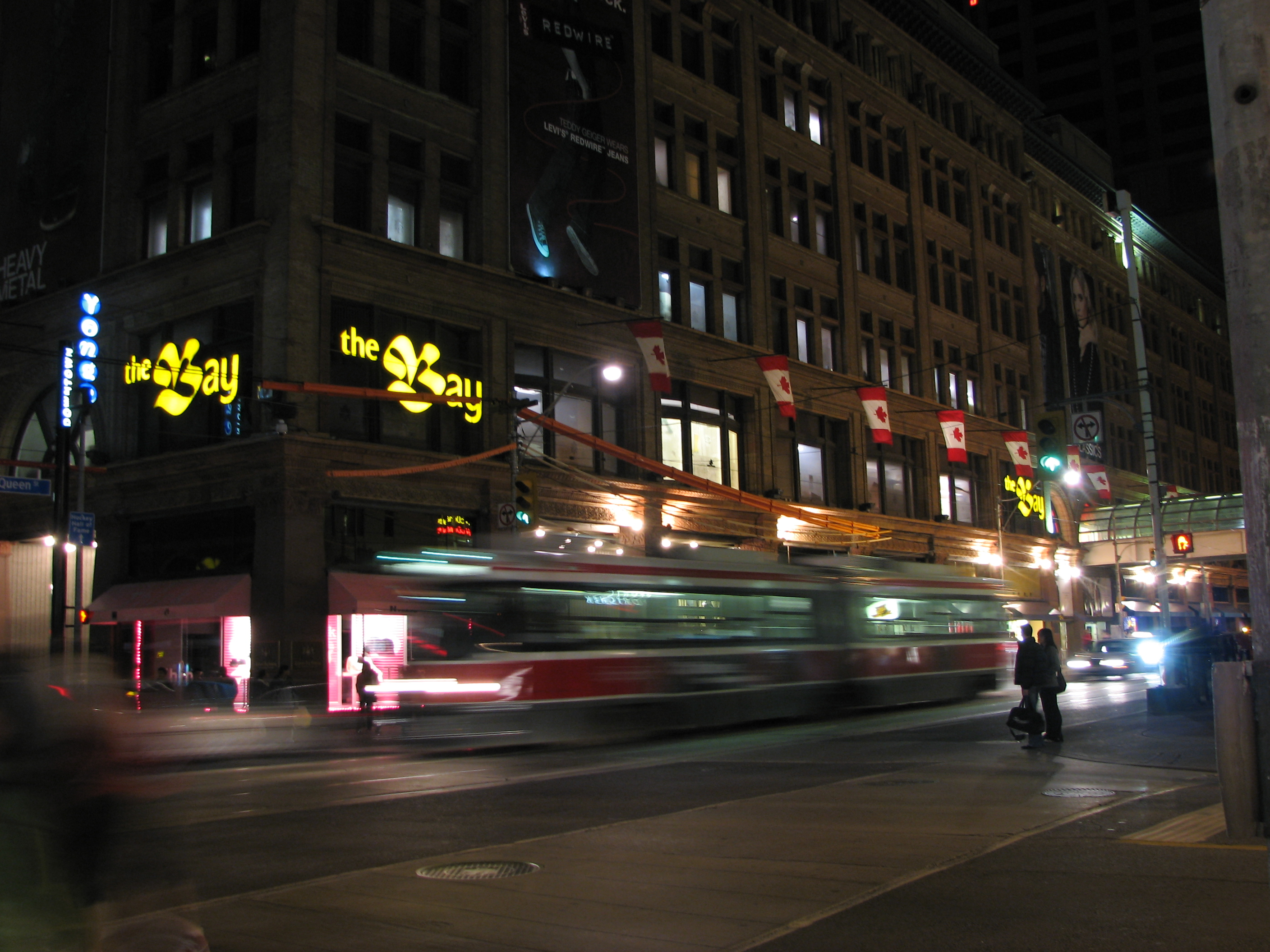
Evening picture (2006)

The store's interior featured an open atrium that extended from the ground to the sixth floor. In addition to other departments, the basement featured a coffee shop and discount division. In 1954, it was connected to the Queen subway station and later to the PATH network.

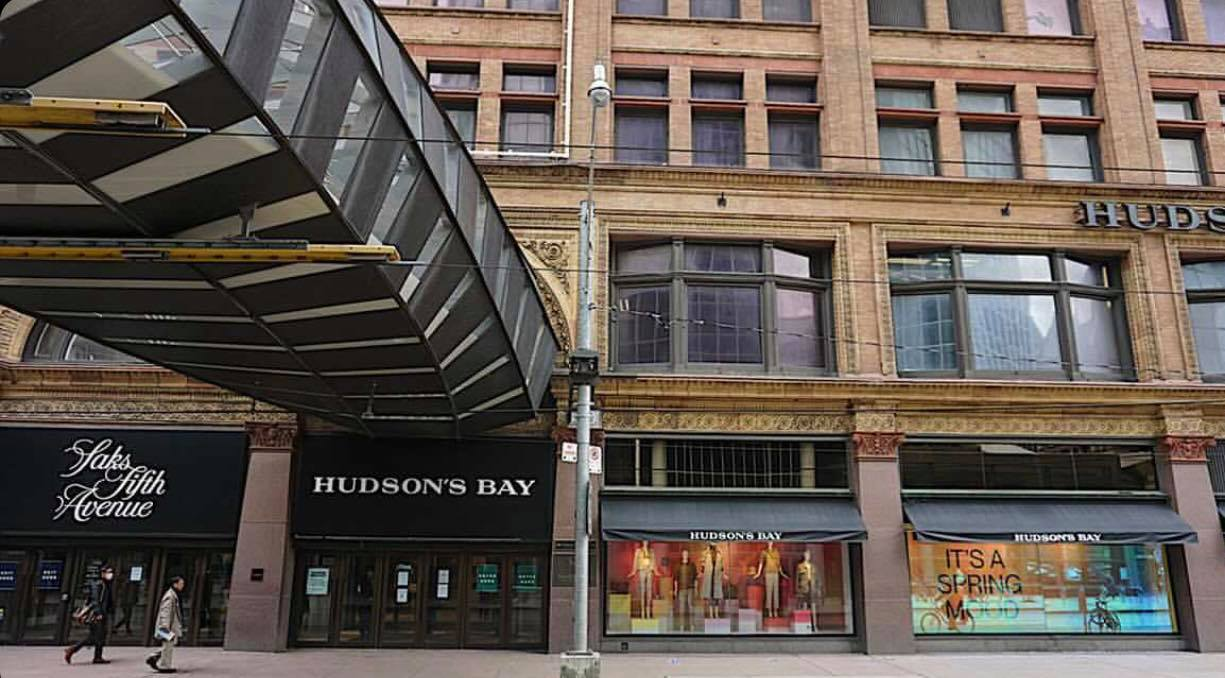
Exterior in 2021 with the names of both Hudson's Bay and Saks Fifth Avenue

The store outgrew the capacity of the structure by 1900, leading to the first of several expansions. Burke and Horwood returned with additions in 1907 and 1923. The largest expansion came in 1929 with Chapman and Oxley's nine-floor Art Deco addition (facing Bay and Richmond) capped by the Arcadian Court. When construction completed, the store occupied two full city blocks.

In 1969, John B. Parkin's Simpson Tower was added to the complex at the corner of Queen Street West and Bay Street to house Simpson's offices.

Unlike Eaton's, the store survived the remaking of the neighbourhood and retained the original look. A glass-enclosed bridge was added in the late 1970s to allow customers to access the Toronto Eaton Centre without braving the elements or traffic.

Today's Special, a children's television series that aired on TVOntario and in the United States on Nickelodeon during the 1980s, was set at the Simpsons store, and occasionally taped scenes on location.

=== 1991–2025: Hudson's Bay ===
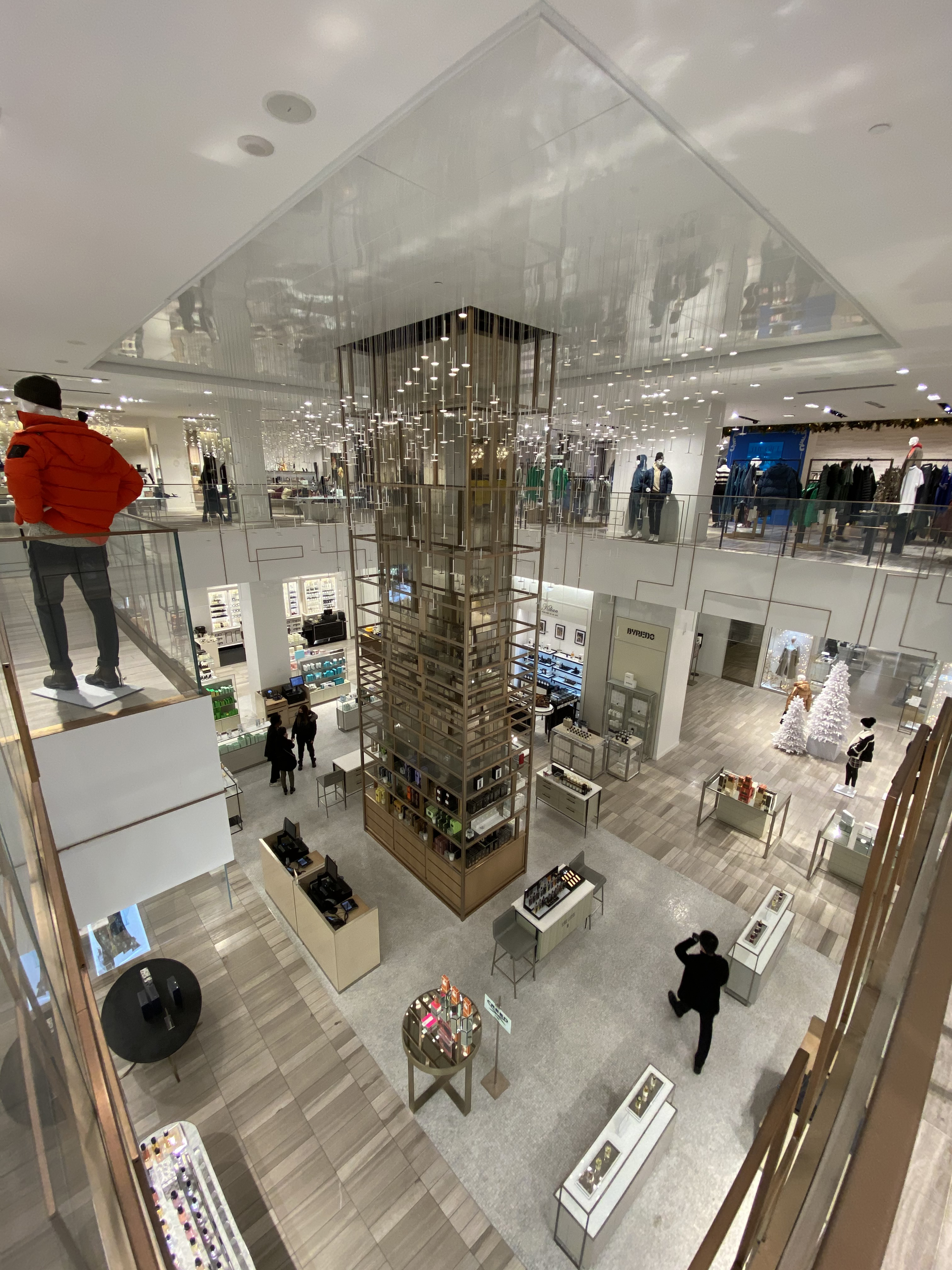
Void of the department store.

In 1991, the Simpson's name was replaced with the banner The Bay (later rebranded to "Hudson's Bay" in 2013).

The Bay Queen Street continued the Simpson's tradition of Christmas-themed display windows facing Queen Street West west of the main Queen Street entrance.

The store was rebranded to Hudson's Bay in 2013, and sub-divided to include the Saks Fifth Avenue Canadian flagship store in 2016. The previous Hudson's Bay flagship store was located several blocks north at the Hudson's Bay Centre on Bloor Street East, and existed alongside the Yonge and Queen flagship store until 2022.

In January 2014, HBC announced it had sold the property to Cadillac Fairview through a sale-and-leaseback arrangement, with HBC leasing the property for at least the following 25 years (with options for a further 50 years). Under the deal, the store is for the first time considered an official part of the Cadillac Fairview-owned Toronto Eaton Centre.

The main department store space was divided into two, with one side remodeled and opened in 2016 as a Saks Fifth Avenue, a luxury department store chain that HBC acquired in 2013, the other half retains the Hudson's Bay store.

In 2016, a grocery store run by Pusateri's, named Saks Food Hall, was added in the basement. It shut down abruptly in 2024 amidst Pusateri's bankruptcy filings, despite initial statements saying it would remain open.

In 2023, a small section of Hudson's Bay in the basement was dedicated to the revived Zellers brand.

The store was one of six locations spared from the creditor protection and liquidation filed by HBC in March 2025. However, on April 23, 2025 due to court rulings deeming it "low probability" to find a buyer to keep the remaining six stores afloat, HBC announced the liquidation of all Hudson's Bay stores, including this one, starting on April 25, 2025. The flagship Toronto store closed on 1 June 2025, along with all other remaining HBC stores in Canada. The stores upper levels and connecting bridge with the Eaton Centre are closed, however the lower basement level remains open to the public in a fenced off walkway layout, due to being a connecting part of the PATH tunnel system under the downtown area.

=== 2025–present ===
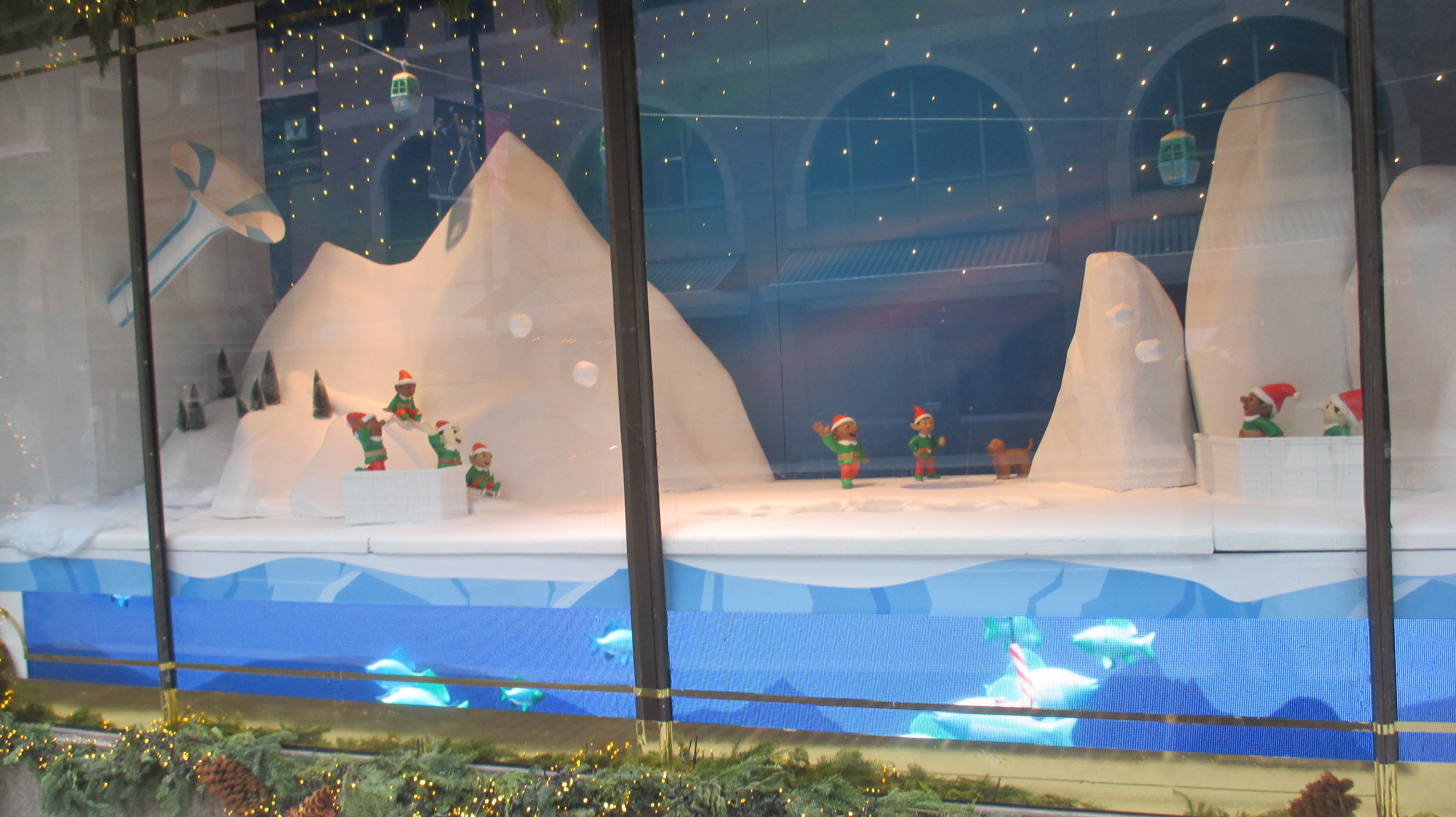
2025 Christmas display at former Bay flagship store

In 2025, Cadillac Fairview wanted to continue the Christmas season tradition of Christmas displays in the ground floor display windows. Thus, CF offered to lease the display windows to companies who wished to install such a seasonal display. Windows would be available on the Yonge, Richmond and York street sides of the building but not on the Queen Street side due to Ontario Line construction. Mars Inc., the candy bar maker, leased windows on the Yonge Street side.

== Gallery ==
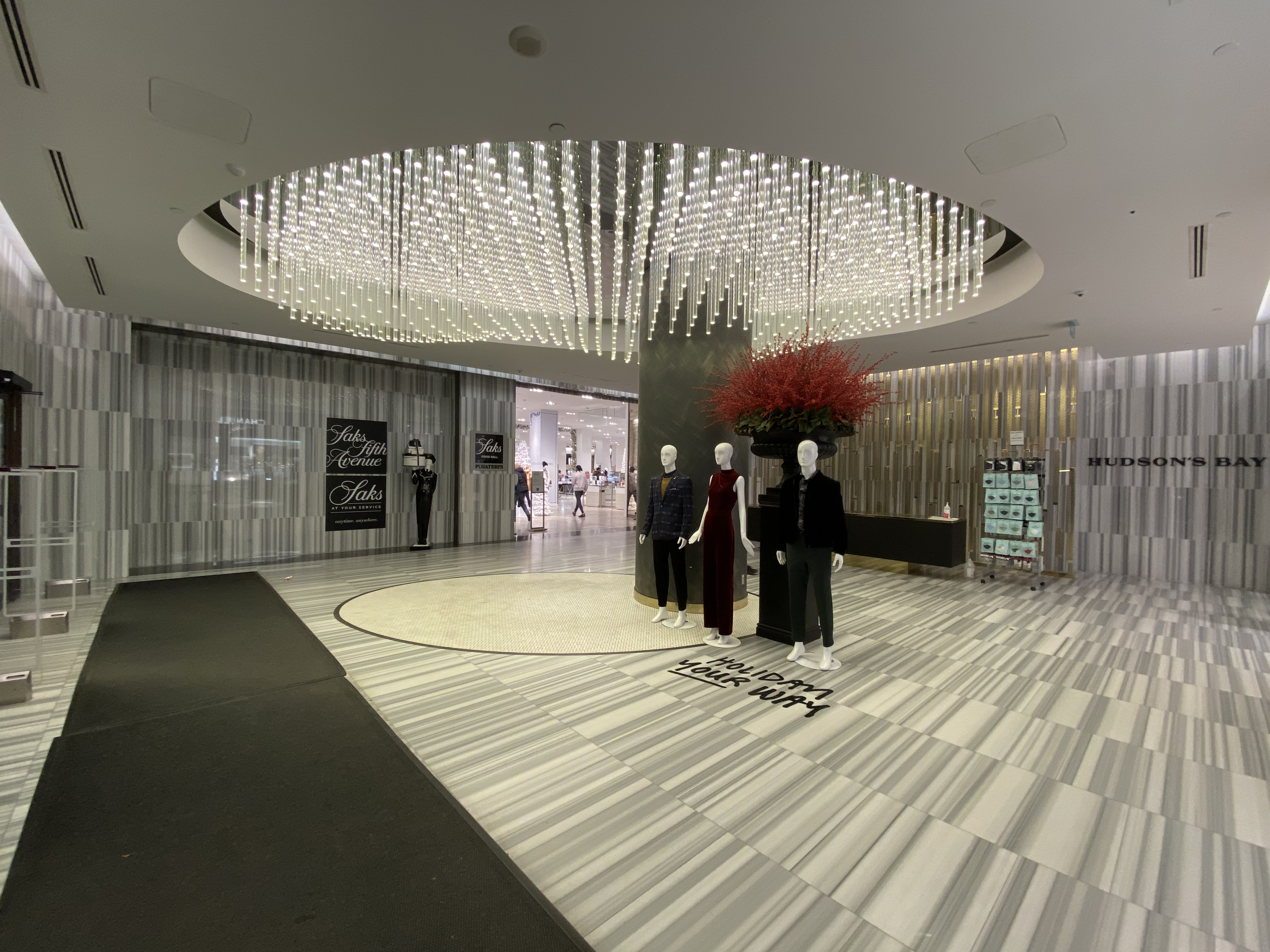
Entrance Lobby

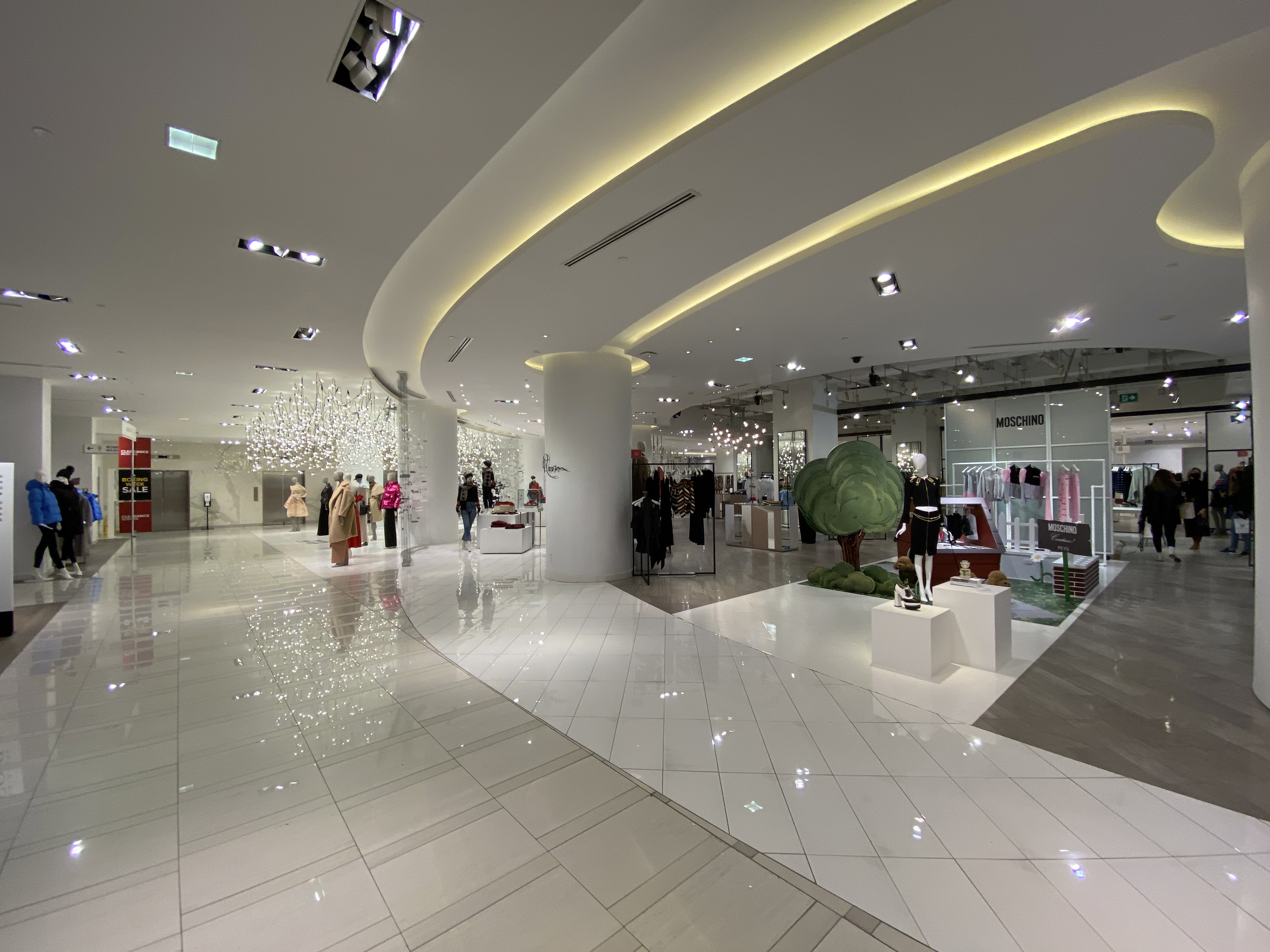
Level 2 Women Fashion

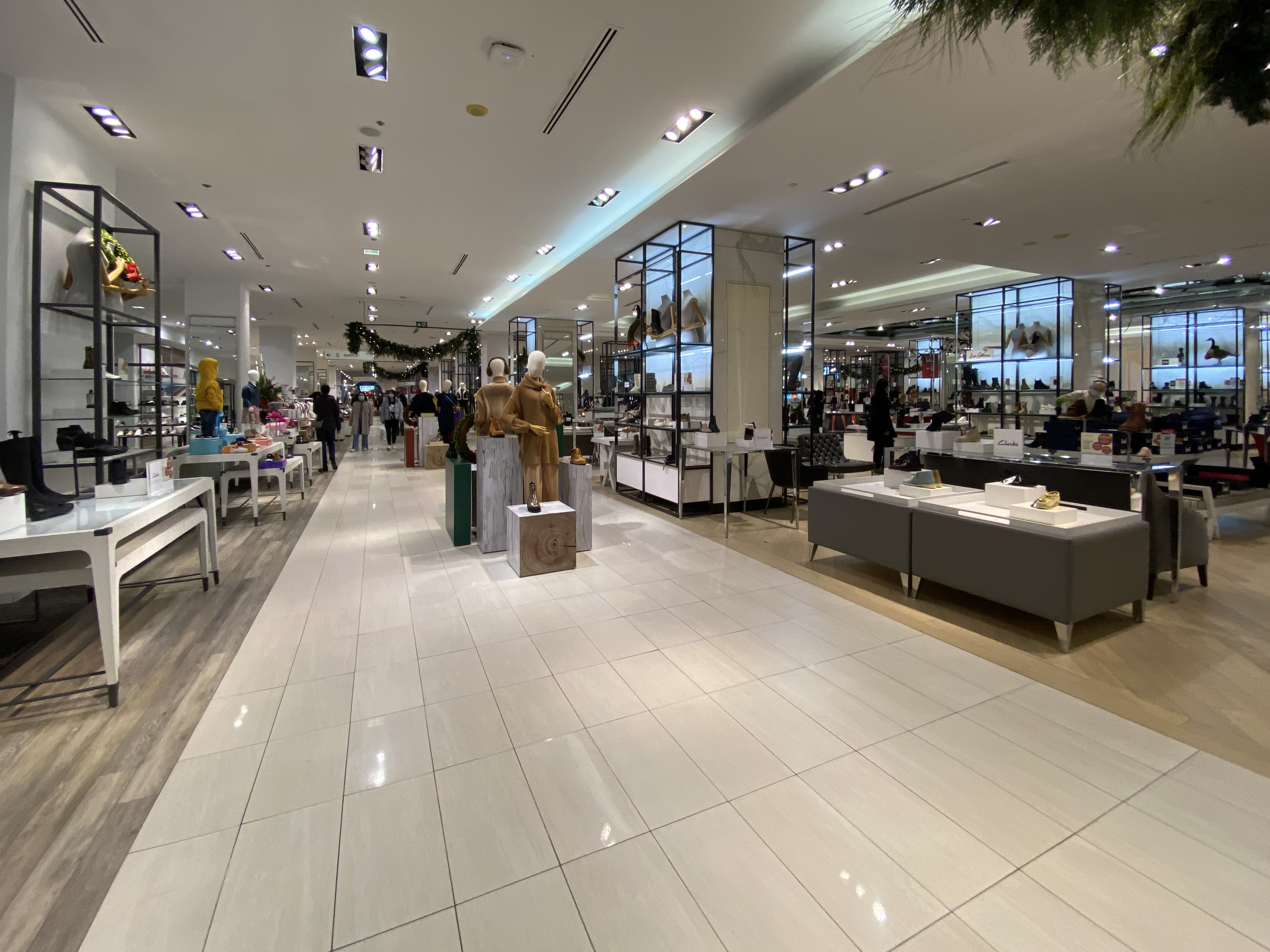
Level 3 Shoes

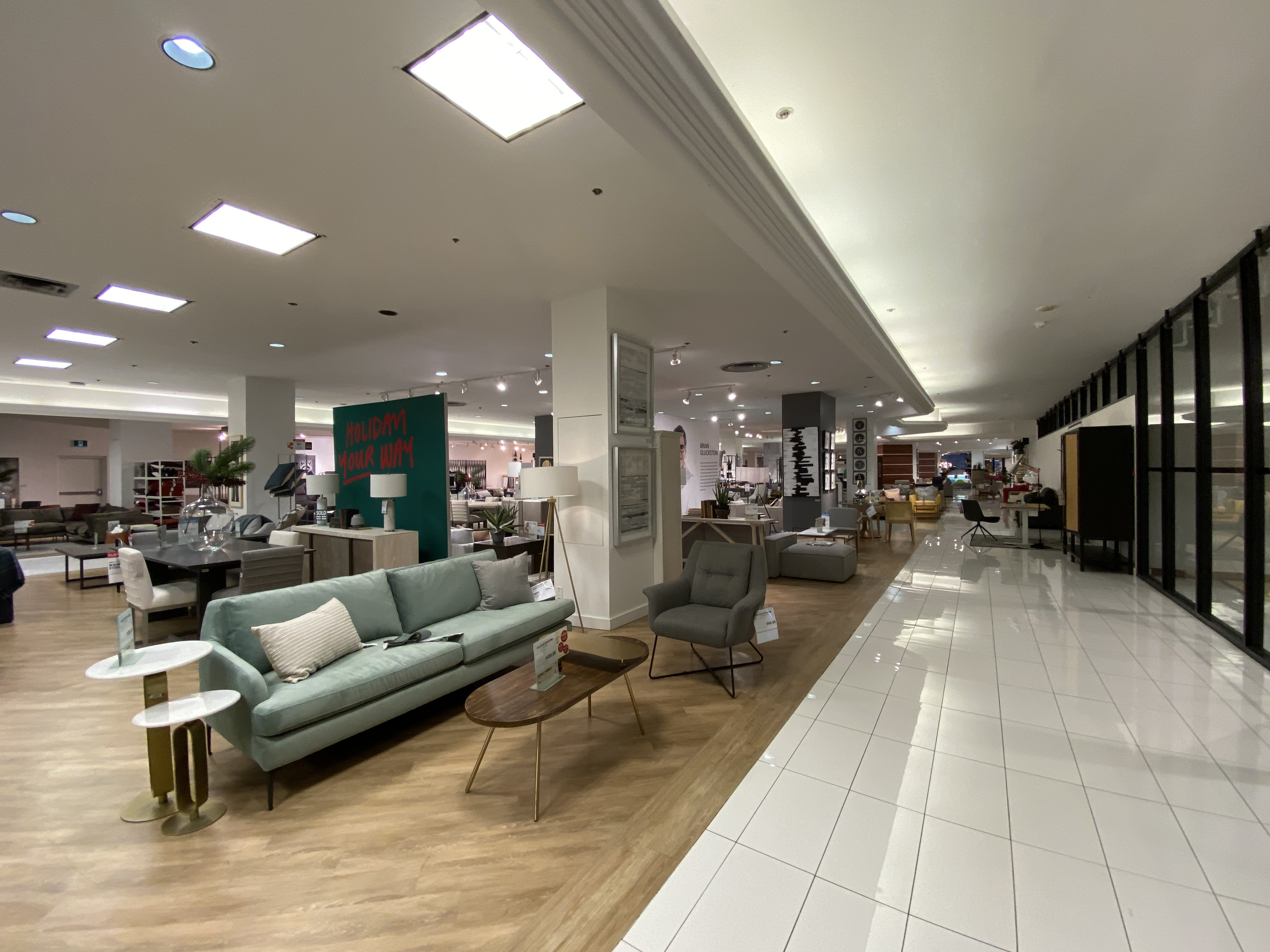
Level 6 Furniture

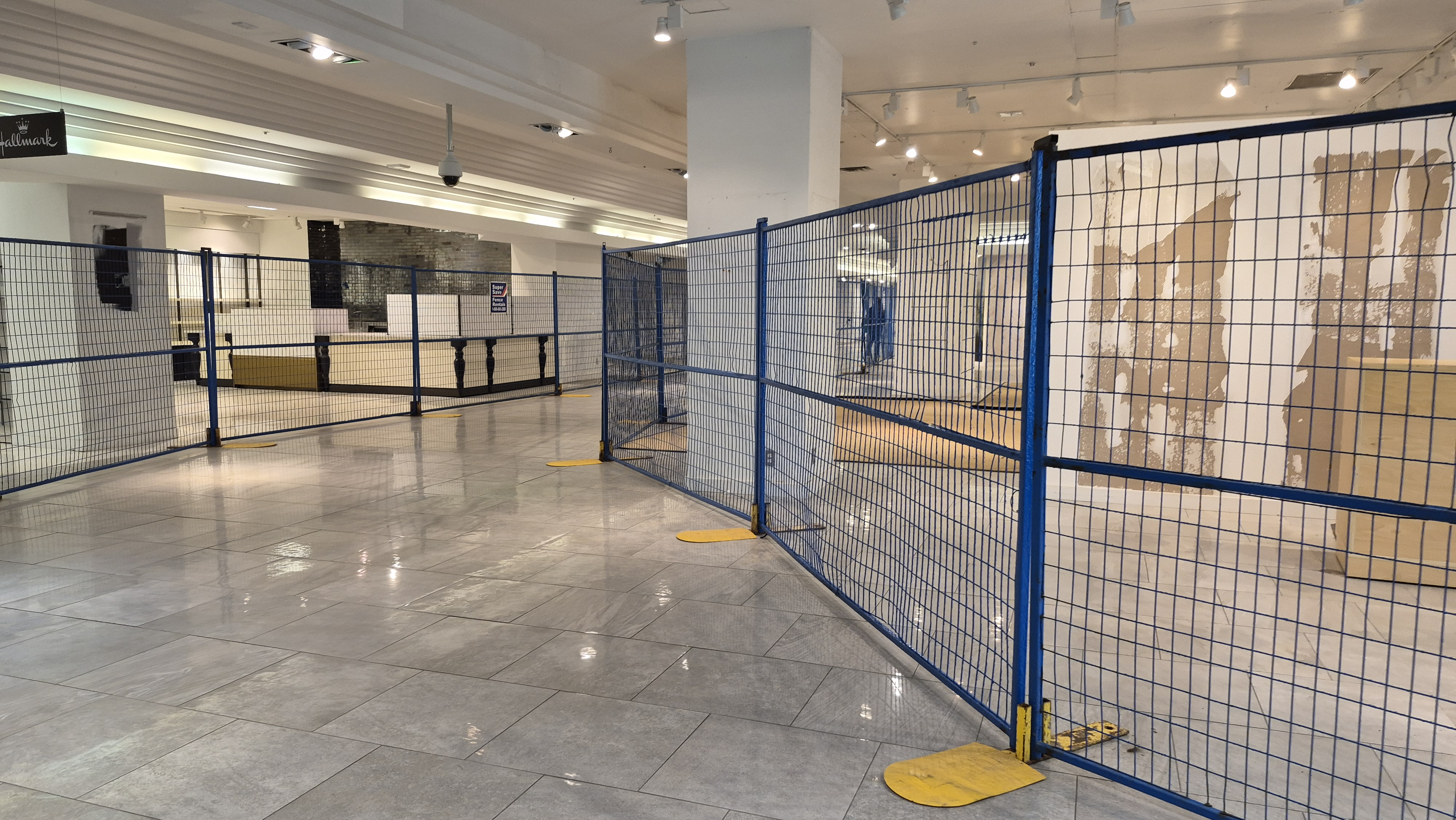
Lower level basement after closure

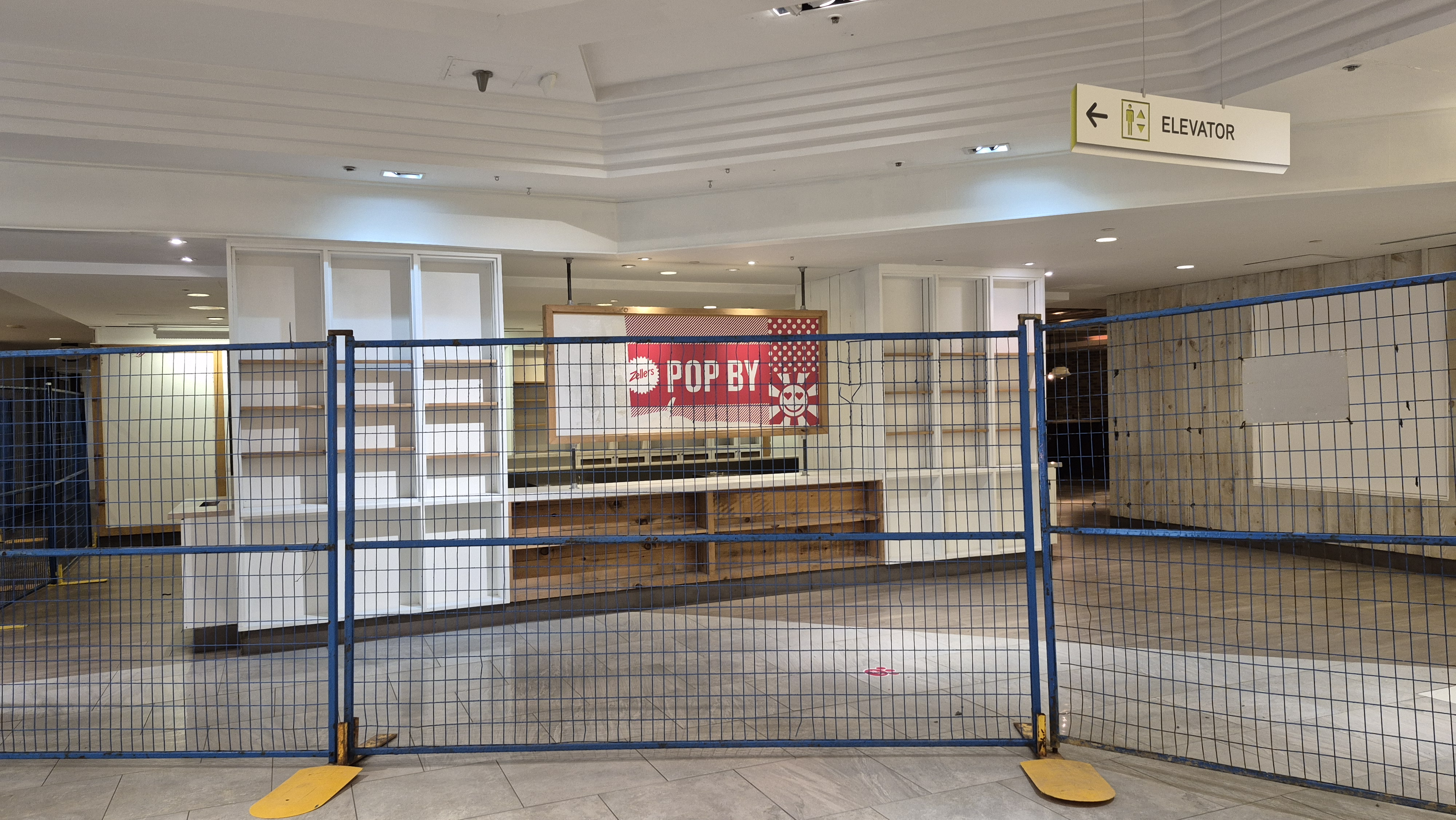
Zellers section after closure

== See also ==
- Toronto Eaton Centre
- Old City Hall (Toronto)
- Eaton's Annex
- Merchandise Building - originally Simpson's Mail Order Building built due to over capacity at the Queen Street store
  - includes the Warehouse at 135 Dalhousie Street
- Cloud Gardens and Bay Adelaide Centre
- Hudson's Bay Montreal Downtown
- Hudson's Bay Vancouver Downtown
