= Toronto Eaton Centre =

Mixed-use in Toronto, Ontario, Canada

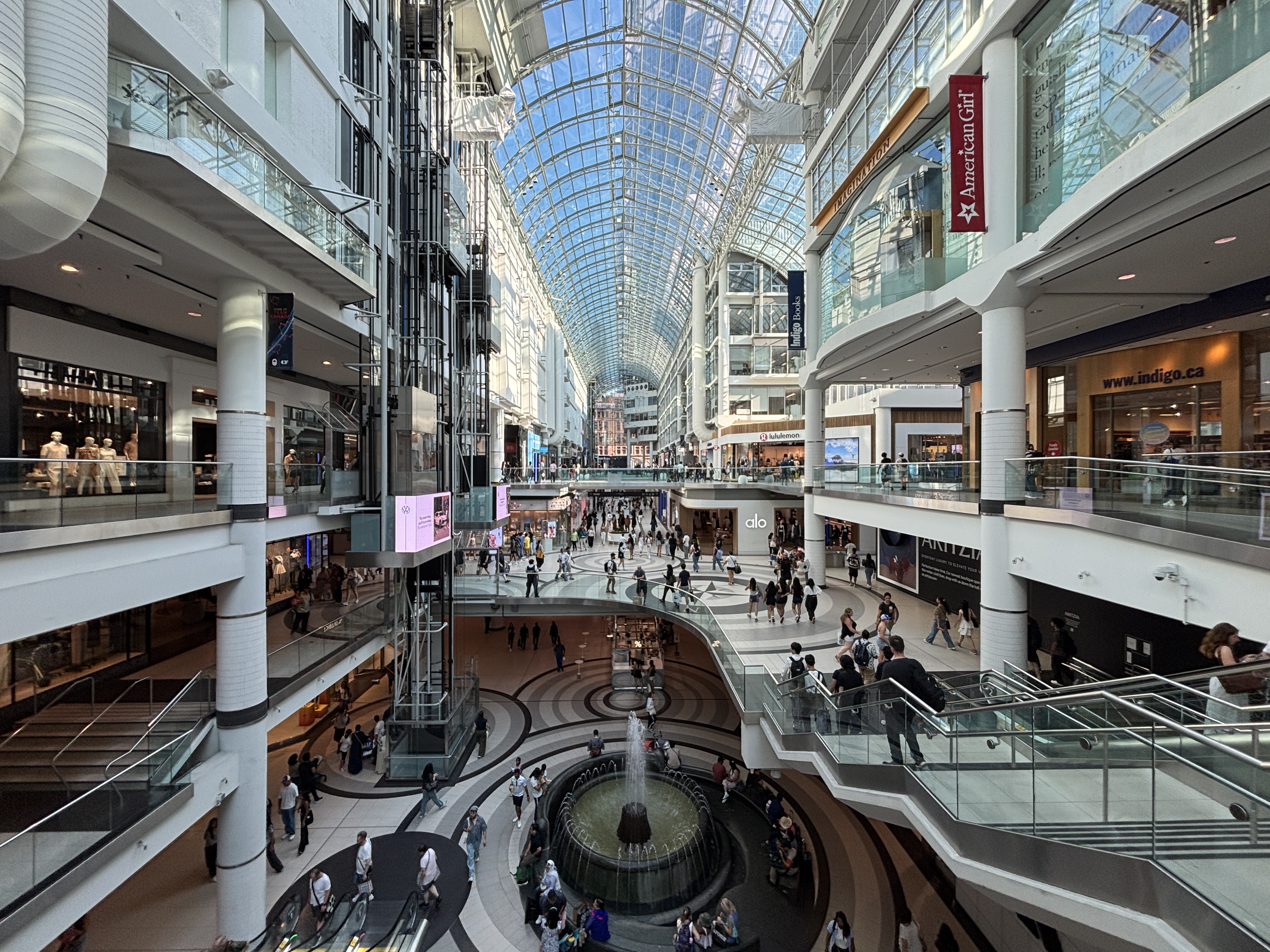
- Mall interior looking south (August 2025)
- Former names: The Eaton Centre (1977–1999); Toronto Eaton Centre (1999–2015)
- Alternative names: Eaton Centre (colloquial name)

General information
- Status: Operational
- Type: Mixed-use
- Location: Toronto, Ontario, Canada, 220 Yonge Street
- Coordinates: 43°39′14″N 79°22′49″W
- Named for: Eaton's
- Opened: 1977; 49 years ago
- Owner: Cadillac Fairview
- Operator: Cadillac Fairview

Technical details
- Floor count: 4 (mall arcade, including galleria); 8 (former Hudson's Bay store); 10 (former Eaton's store); 36 (highest number of storeys in office buildings)
- Floor area: 201,320 square metres (2,167,000 sq ft) GLA

Design and construction
- Architect: Eberhard H. Zeidler
- Architecture firm: B+H Architects and Zeidler Roberts Partnership
- Developer: Cadillac Fairview Corporation, TD Bank and Eaton's

Other information
- Number of stores: 235
- Number of anchors: 6
- Parking: 2 parkades
- Public transit: TMU, Queen; 501; 505

Website
- Official website

The CF Toronto Eaton Centre, commonly referred to simply as the Eaton Centre, is a shopping mall and office complex in the downtown core of Toronto, Ontario, Canada. It is owned and managed by Cadillac Fairview (CF). It was named after the Eaton's department store chain that once anchored it before the chain went defunct in the late 1990s.

The Toronto Eaton Centre attracts more visitors than any of Toronto's tourist attractions because it sits on top of two subway stations in downtown Toronto and is close to Union Station. It is one of North America's busiest shopping malls when one counts the daily commuters along with tourist traffic. The mall had over 230 stores and restaurants in 2014.

== Location and access ==
The main portion of the Toronto Eaton Centre complex is bounded by Yonge Street on the east, Queen Street West on the south, Dundas Street West on the north, and to the west by James Street and Trinity Square. There are three office towers, while the main retail mall in the centre is organized around a long arcade, running parallel to Yonge Street. The mall's north street entrance (at Level 3) is one level higher than the south street entrance (at Level 2), given that the mall is built over the former Taddle Creek and the mall is thus on a gentle slope.

South of the main shopping arcade is the Hudson's Bay Queen Street complex, including the Simpson Tower offices and flagship location of the Hudson's Bay department store chain. Hudson's Bay Queen Street is connected to the main retail mall (at Level 3) by a skywalk over Queen Street West and underground by Toronto's Path network, and has been managed as part of the Eaton Centre since 2014 after being purchased by Cadillac Fairview. Hudson's Bay Queen Street itself is bounded by Yonge Street to the east, Queen Street West to the north, Richmond Street West to the south, and Bay Street to the west.

The Toronto Eaton Centre's interior passages also form part of the Path underground pedestrian network, and the centre is served by two Toronto Transit Commission subway stations: TMU and Queen on Line 1 Yonge–University; TMU station is connected to Level 1 (walkway under platform level) and Level 2 (platform level), while Queen station is connected to Level 1. The complex also contains four office buildings (at 20 Queen Street West, 250 Yonge Street, 1 Dundas Street West and 401 Bay Street) and Toronto Metropolitan University (TMU)'s Ted Rogers School of Management. Additionally, the Toronto Eaton Centre is linked to a 17-storey Marriott hotel on Bay Street.

== History ==
=== Early plans ===
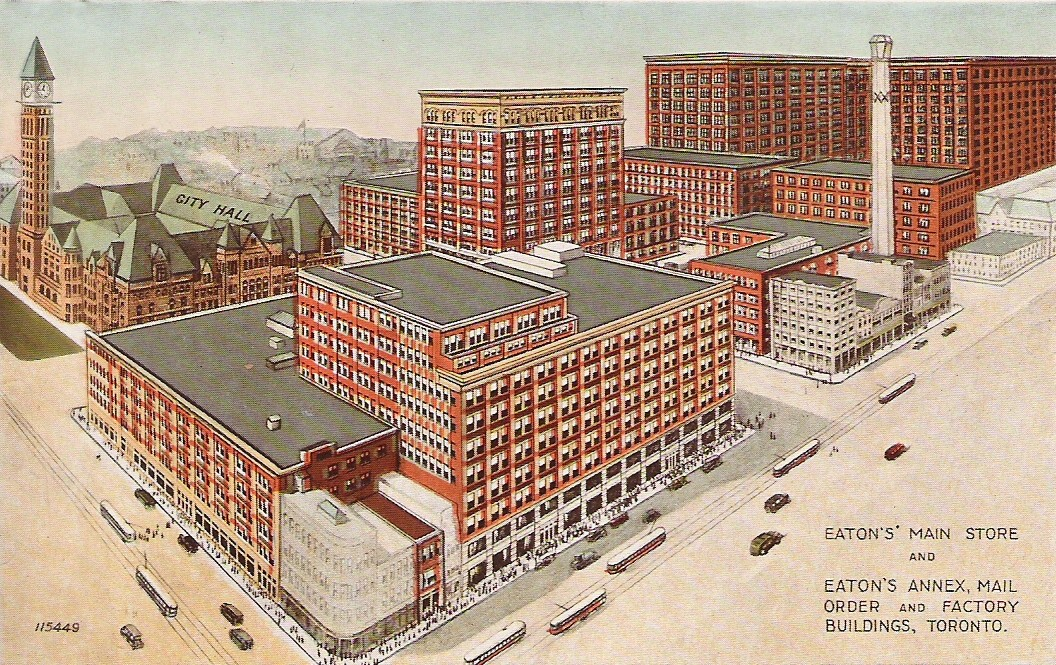
The view northwest from Yonge and Queen Streets at the various Eaton's buildings in 1920, demonstrating the extent of Eaton's landholdings on the current site of the Eaton Centre

Timothy Eaton founded a dry goods store on Yonge Street in the 19th century that revolutionized retailing in Canada and became the largest department store chain in the country. By the 20th century, the Eaton's chain owned most of the land bounded by Yonge, Queen, Bay and Dundas streets, with the notable exceptions of Old City Hall and the Church of the Holy Trinity. The Eaton's land, once the site of Timothy Eaton's first store, was occupied by Eaton's large Main Store, the Eaton's Annex and a number of related mail order and factory buildings. As the chain's warehouse and support operations were increasingly shifting to cheaper suburban locales in the 1960s, Eaton's wanted to make better use of its valuable downtown landholdings. In particular, the chain wanted to build a massive new flagship store to replace the aging Main Store at Yonge and Queen streets and the Eaton's College Street store a few blocks to the north.

In the mid-1960s, Eaton's announced plans for a massive office and shopping complex that would occupy several city blocks. Eaton's sought to demolish Toronto's Old City Hall (except for the clock tower and cenotaph) and the Church of the Holy Trinity. The plan required the closing of a number of small city streets within the block: Albert Street, Louisa Street, Terauley Street (not to be confused with the stretch of Bay Street north of Queen Street, also formerly known as Terauley Street), James Street, Albert Lane, Downey's Lane and Trinity Square. At one point, even the Old City Hall clock tower was to be demolished. After a fierce local debate over the fate of the city hall and church buildings, Eaton's put its plans on hiatus in 1967.

The Eaton Centre plans were resuscitated in 1971, although these plans allowed for the preservation of Old City Hall. Controversy erupted anew, however, as the congregation of the Church of the Holy Trinity exhibited an increased willingness to fight the demolition plans for its church. Eventually, the Eaton Centre plans were revised to save Old City Hall and the church and then revised further when Holy Trinity's parishioners successfully fought to ensure that the new complex would not block all sunlight to the church.

These amendments to the plans resulted in three significant changes to the proposed centre from the 1960s concept. First, the new Eaton's store was shifted north to Dundas Street, as the new store would be too large to be accommodated in its existing location on Queen Street (opposite its rival Simpson's, which is now the Hudson's Bay store) as a result of the preservation of Old City Hall. This resulted in the mall being constructed with Eaton's and Simpson's acting as anchors at either end. The second significant change was the reduction in the size of the office component so that the Eaton Centre project no longer represented an attempt to extend the City's financial district north of Queen Street, as the Eaton family had contemplated in the 1960s. Finally, the bulk of the centre was shifted east to the Yonge Street frontage, and the complex was designed so that it no longer had any frontage along Bay Street. Old City Hall and the church were thus saved, as was the Salvation Army headquarters building by virtue of its location between the two other preserved buildings (although the Salvation Army building was demolished in the late 1990s to make way for an Eaton Centre expansion, the Salvation Army's Canadian head offices moved to Leaside, and a City of Toronto plaque was placed at the original site).

=== Name ===
At the time of the centre's opening in 1977, the complex was marketed as "The Eaton Centre", before changing its name to "Toronto Eaton Centre" in the early 1990s to disambiguate from other Eaton Centres across Canada.

Despite the bankruptcy of the Eaton's department store chain in 1999 (and the closure of a short-lived Sears Canada-owned revival in 2002), the mall retained the Eaton Centre name, representing an ongoing tribute to Timothy Eaton and the small shop he once opened at this location. However, as Sears retained the Eaton's trademarks and other intellectual property (IP), the name was used under licence until December 2016, when mall owner Cadillac Fairview acquired the Eaton's IP outright.

In early 2014, mall management began an effort to enforce usage of the full "Toronto Eaton Centre" name. However, at that time, exterior signage was inconsistent as to the centre's name, with signs facing Sankofa Square (formerly Yonge–Dundas Square) simply reading "Eaton Centre" while several others used the full name. Soon after, in September 2015, Cadillac Fairview announced it was rebranding all of its mall properties by adding the prefix "CF"; thus, the complex has subsequently been referred to as "CF Toronto Eaton Centre" by its owners. This branding was phased in on signage over the following year as renovations in the former Sears wing concluded.

=== Construction ===
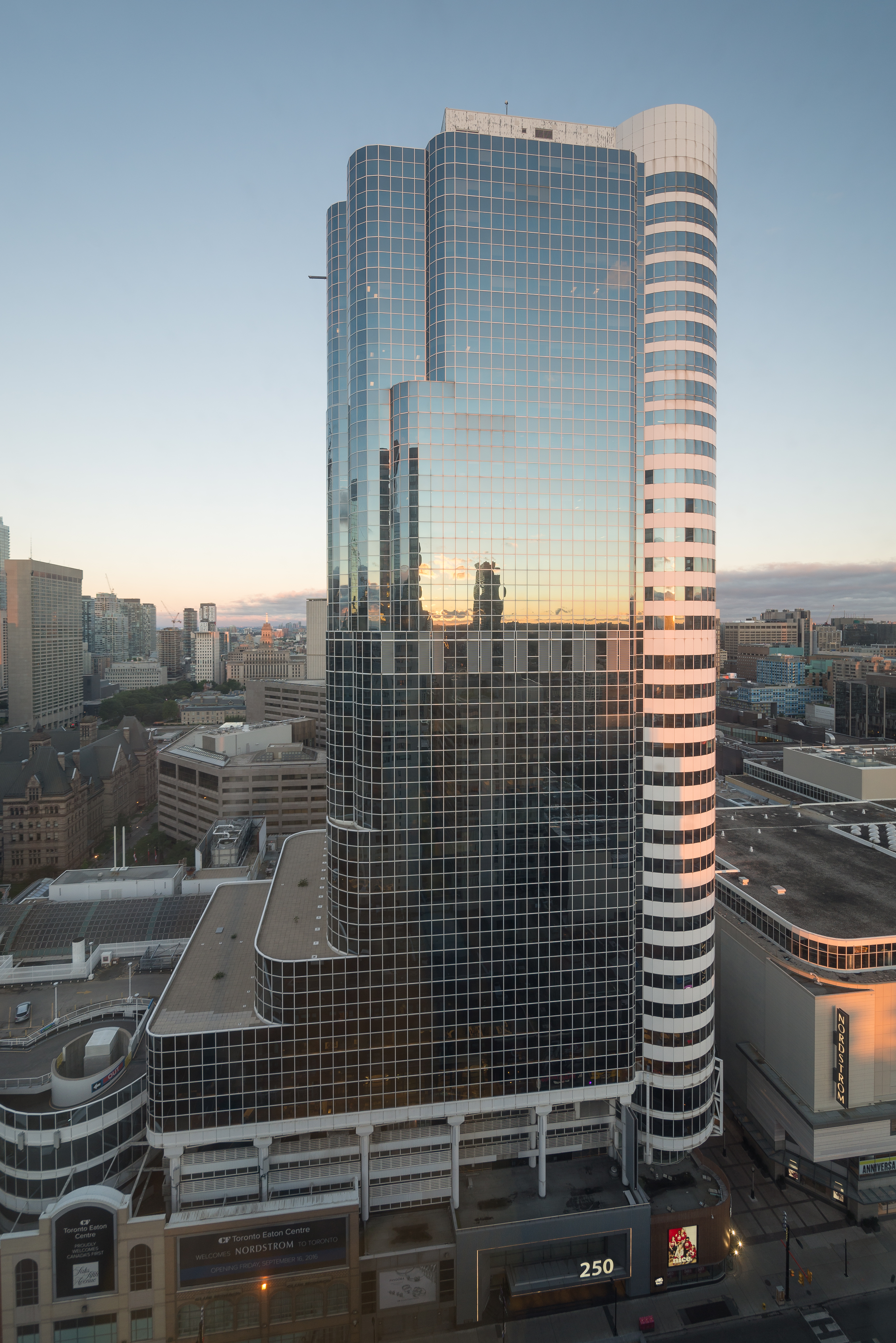
250 Yonge is one of four office components built into the Eaton Centre complex.

Eaton's partnered with the Cadillac Fairview development company and the Toronto-Dominion Bank in the construction of the Eaton Centre. The complex was designed by Eberhard Zeidler and Bregman + Hamann Architects as a multi-levelled, vaulted glass-ceiling galleria, modelled after the Galleria Vittorio Emanuele II in Milan, Italy. At the time, the interior design of the Eaton Centre was considered revolutionary and influenced shopping centre architecture throughout North America.

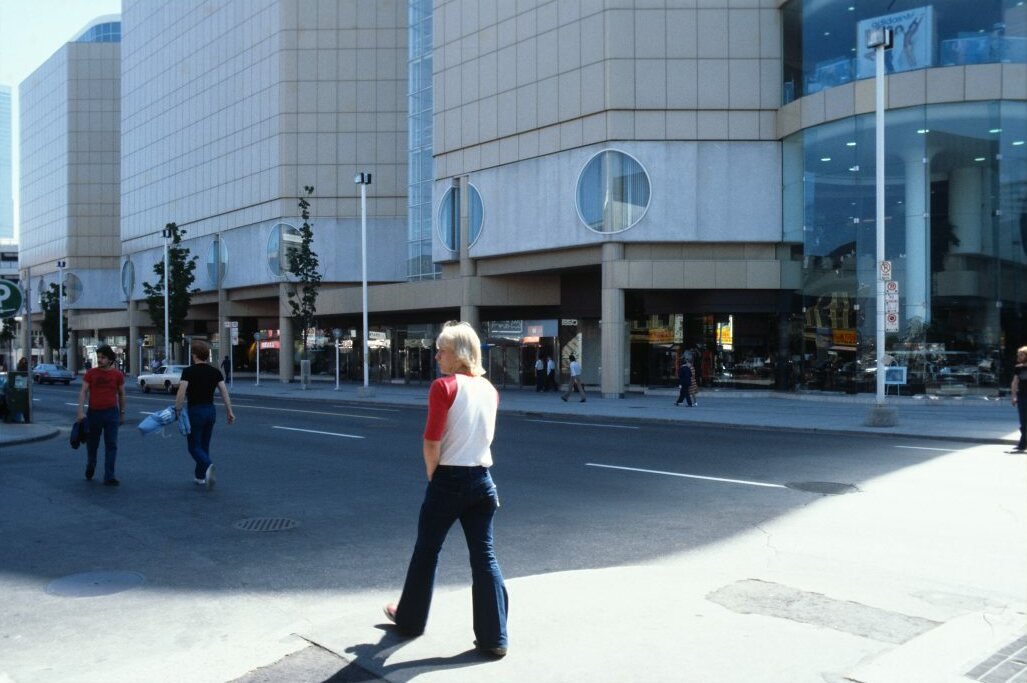
Exterior of the Eaton Centre, 1979, from the City of Toronto Archives

The first phase, including the nine-storey, 1,000,000-square-foot (93,000 m^{2}) Eaton's store, opened in 1977. The temporary wall at the south end was mirrored over its full height to give an impression of what the complete galleria would look like. The old Eaton's store at Yonge and Queen streets was then demolished and the south half of the complex opened in its place in 1979. The same year, the north end of the complex added a multiplex cinema, Cineplex, at the time the largest in the world with 18 screens.

Terauley Street, Louisa Street, Downey's Lane and Albert Lane were closed and disappeared from the city street grid to make way for the new complex. Albert Street and James Street were preserved only to the extent of their frontage around Old City Hall (although at the request of the Church of the Holy Trinity, the city of Toronto required that pedestrians be able to cross through the mall where Albert Street once existed at all times, which is still possible). Trinity Square, however, lost its public access to Yonge Street and became a pedestrian-only square with access via Bay Street.

The exterior of the Eaton Centre store was designed in the style of the 1970s, intended at that time to be a statement of Eaton's dominance and its aspirations. Urban planners and designers have lamented this original exterior design. The complex was oriented inwards, with very few street-facing retail stores, windows or even mall entrances to animate the exterior. Much of the Yonge Street façade, facing what was once one of Toronto's primary shopping thoroughfares, was dominated by nine storey parking garage. At the insistence of the Metro Toronto government, which had jurisdiction over major roads and wanted right-of-way to add an additional lane to Yonge Street, the complex was set back a considerable distance from Yonge Street, thus further weakening the centre's streetscape presence.

The office component of the complex was constructed over the years, as follows:

- "One Dundas West" (29 storeys) in 1977, designed by B+H Architects and Zeidler Partnership Architects;
- "Cadillac Fairview Tower" (36 storeys) in 1982, designed by Bregman + Hamann Architects, and Zeidler Partnership Architects;
- "250 Yonge Street" (formerly Eaton Tower) (35 storeys) in 1992, designed by Zeidler Partnership Architects, and Crang & Boake; and
- "Simpson Tower" (33 storeys) at 401 Bay Street, completed in 1969 and became part of the Toronto Eaton Centre upon Cadillac Fairview's acquisition of the Hudson's Bay block in 2014.

=== Early years ===
The centre was a success, and additional shopping centres across Canada with the Eaton brand name were built. The mall's profits were said to be substantial to a degree that it has often been credited with keeping the Eaton's chain afloat for another two decades before it succumbed to bankruptcy in 1999. Since then, the Eaton Centre is a popular Toronto tourist attraction.

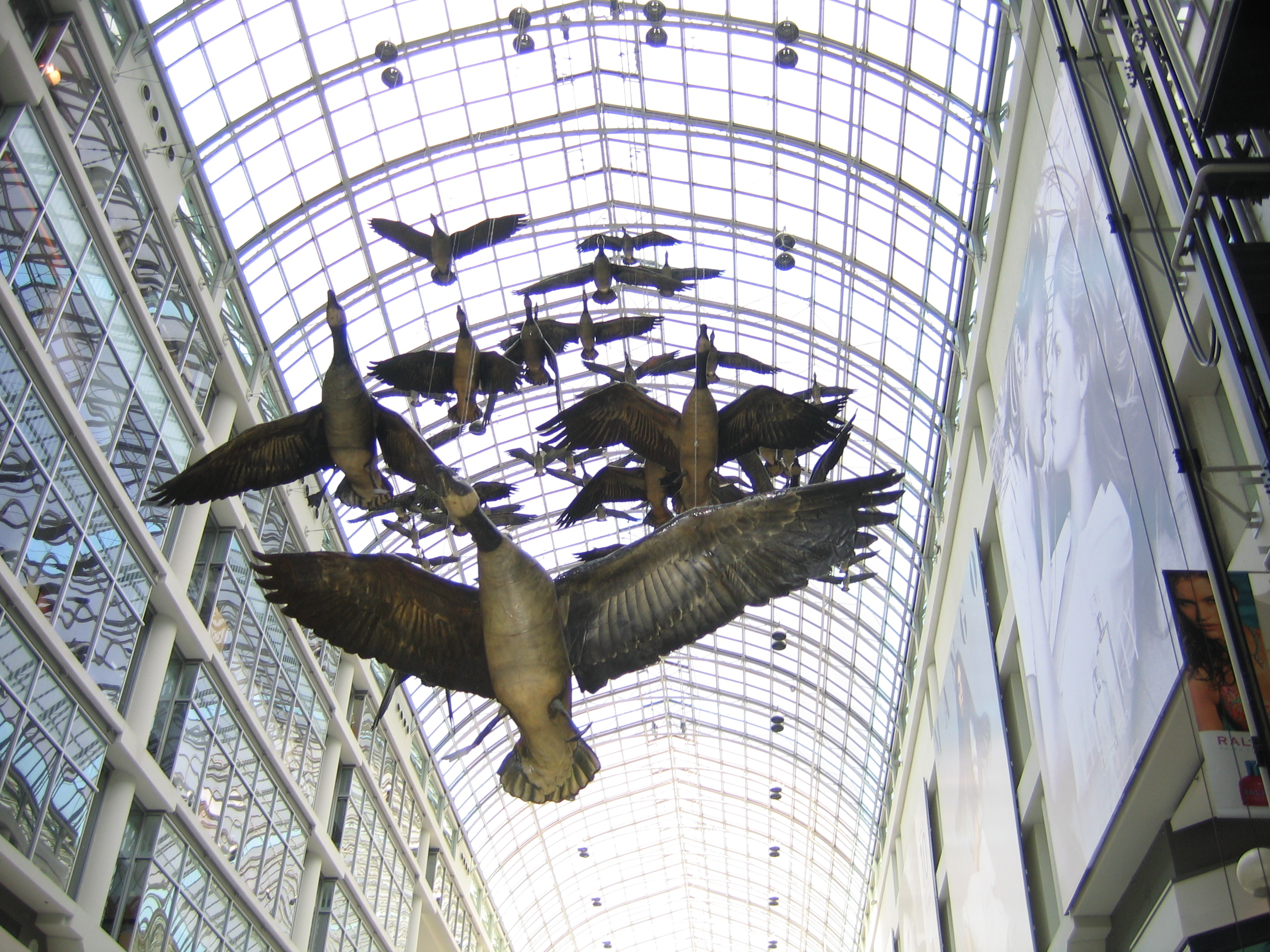
The Eaton Centre features fibreglass Canada geese hanging from the ceiling, which is an art installation by Michael Snow. This installation is named Flight Stop.

One of the most prominent sights in the shopping mall is the group of fibreglass Canada geese hanging from the glass ceiling. This group of sculptures, named Flight Stop, is the work of Canadian artist Michael Snow. It was also the subject of an important intellectual property court ruling. One year, the management of the centre decided to decorate the geese with red ribbons for the Christmas season, without consulting Snow. Snow sued, arguing that the ribbons made his naturalistic work "ridiculous" and harmed his reputation as an artist, and in Snow v Eaton Centre Ltd, the court ruled that even though Eaton Centre Limited owned the sculpture, the ribbons had infringed Snow's moral rights. The ribbons were ordered removed.

=== 1990s and 2000s ===
When the Eaton's chain went bankrupt in 1999, many of its corporate assets were acquired by Sears Canada, which included the lease on the department store space at the north end of the mall, giving Sears a prime location in Toronto's downtown core for the first time. Sears Canada briefly ran the department store as part of an upscale eatons [sic] mini-chain but by 2002, the store was rebranded to Sears. Sears Canada converted the uppermost four floors of the nine-storey department space to corporate offices, replacing their previous headquarters at 222 Jarvis Street, and the lowest floor was converted to mall retail space, but the resultant four-level department store was still Sears' largest in the world at about 75,981 square metres (817,850 sq ft). Shortly after Sears' acquisition of Eaton's, the statue of Timothy Eaton was moved from the Dundas Street entrance to the Royal Ontario Museum.

In the early 2000s, owner Cadillac Fairview redesigned the mall's Yonge Street façade, bringing it closer to the street and making it more closely resemble an urban shopping district, with stores opening directly onto the street, and presenting a variety of façades to create the perception of an urban streetscape. Further redevelopments, in the late 1990s and early 2000s, added new retail space. The west side of the complex, opposite Albert Street, was expanded. The glass atrium in the northeast corner at the intersection of Yonge and Dundas streets was redesigned, with a number of former tenants—including a Toronto Police Service office—relocated or evicted, to make way for H&M's Canadian flagship store designed by Queen's Quay Architects International Inc.

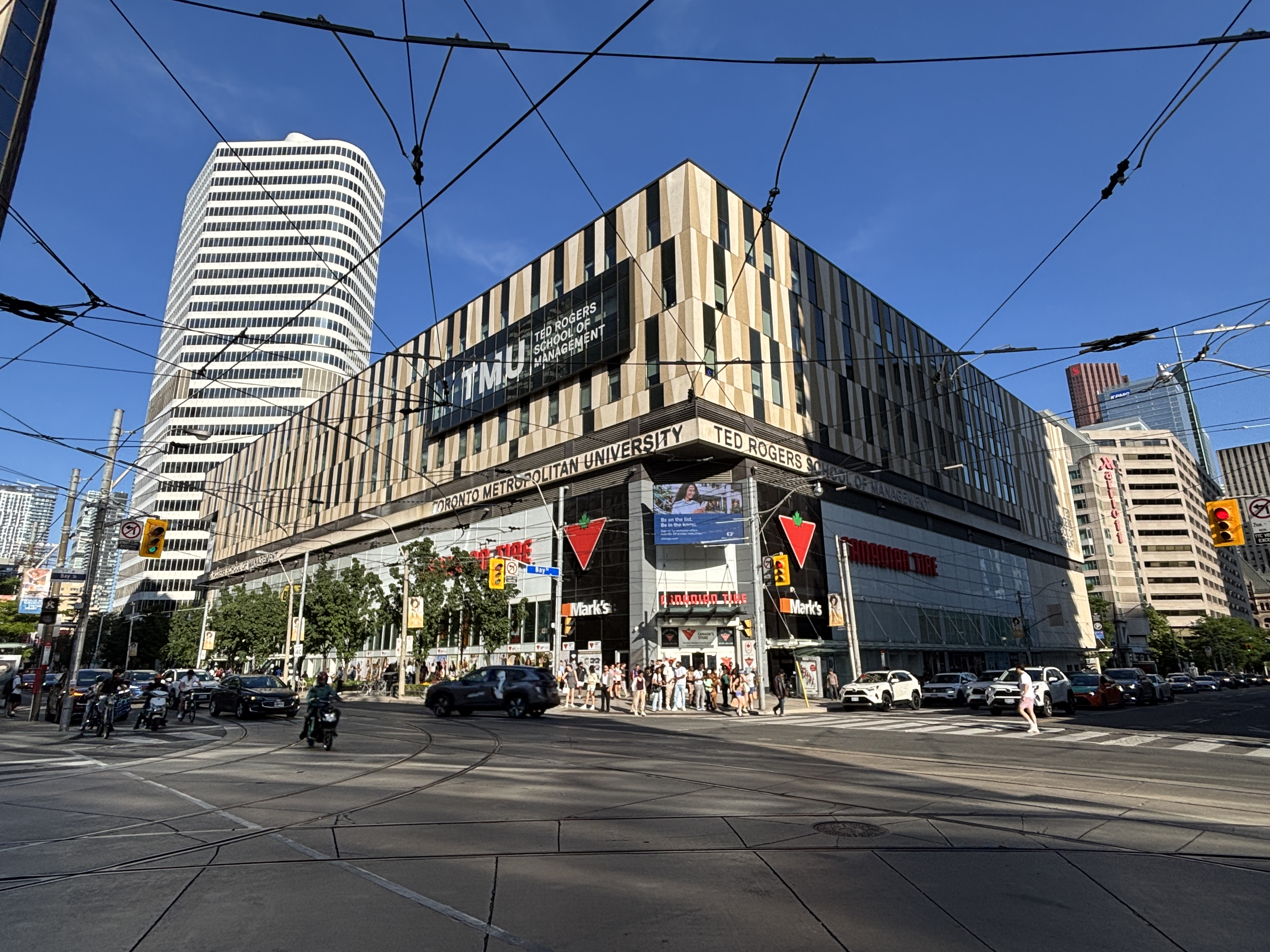
In 2006, a new wing of the Toronto Eaton Centre was opened, containing several stores, a parking garage, and Toronto Metropolitan University's Faculty of Business as seen in 2025. Toronto Metropolitan University was known as Ryerson University at the time of opening.

One of the mall's two parking garages, the nine-storey Dundas Parkade on Dundas Street with its two spiral stack ramps and the multiplex cinema below it, was demolished in 2003. In the place of the garage and of a vacant development site on the southeast corner of Dundas and Bay streets, a new wing of the Toronto Eaton Centre was opened in 2006, containing Canadian Tire, Best Buy and Mark's, with Toronto Metropolitan University's Faculty of Business and a new parking garage with 574 spaces on the upper levels. This work was done by Queen's Quay Architects International Inc. with Zeidler Partnership Architects.

In 2014, the retail complex occupies about 160,000 square metres (1,722,000 sq ft), making it the second-largest mall in Ontario (after Square One Shopping Centre in Mississauga but ahead of Yorkdale Shopping Centre in Toronto's north end).

==== 2010 revitalization project ====
On June 18, 2010, Cadillac Fairview announced a two-year, CA$120 million renovation and revitalization plan for the mall. Upgrades include new flooring throughout, the redevelopment of the centre's two existing food courts, upgrades and expansions to washroom facilities, lighting improvements, new railings, new entry doors, and green initiatives.

In June 2010, a would-be shopper was filmed shouting at the locked doors of an entrance to the Eaton Centre, which was in the process of entering lockdown as the G20 Summit street protests loomed nearby and was later uploaded to YouTube. The video quickly became an Internet meme, but was removed by the original poster shortly thereafter. However, the video has been re-uploaded hundreds of times by other users. The man's name was Lee Zaslofsky, a Canadian anti-war activist who protested the Western occupation of Iraq. Zaslofsky died on August 24, 2024.

=== Since 2010 ===
==== 2012 shooting ====
On June 2, 2012, a shooting took place in the Urban Eatery food court while the mall was heavily crowded with shoppers. Seven people were shot: one of them, 24-year-old Ahmed Hassan, died at the scene while another, 22-year-old Nixon Nirmalendran, died at a hospital on June 11, 2012. According to Toronto Police Chief Bill Blair, Hassan and Nirmalendran may have had gang affiliations although Nirmalendran's lawyer denied this. Others were injured in the panic as people fled the area, including a 28-year-old pregnant woman who began undergoing labour but did not give birth. A highly publicized coincidence is the case of 24-year-old aspiring Denver-based sports broadcasting reporter for Altitude Sports TV and KKFN 104.3 fm Jessica Ghawi, who had left the food court minutes prior to the shooting, and was then killed seven weeks later in a mass shooting at a movie theatre in Aurora, Colorado.

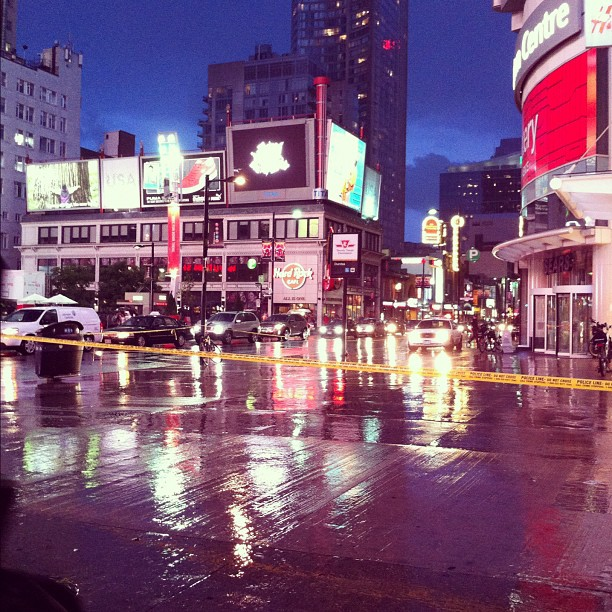
Police tape sectioning off the entrance to the Eaton Centre following a shooting incident in 2012

Two days after the shooting, 23-year-old Christopher Husbands turned himself in to authorities and was charged with first-degree murder. At the time of the shooting, he was under house arrest for unrelated charges. He was found guilty of second-degree murder and guilty of five counts of aggravated assault, one count of criminal negligence causing bodily harm and one count of reckless discharge of a firearm. In April 2015, Husbands was sentenced to 30 years-to-life imprisonment.

Husbands had grown up with Nirmalendran and his brothers, and was close friends with them. Four months prior to the shooting, he had survived an attack in which he was beaten and stabbed more than twenty-five times by six associates, allegedly including Nirmalendran and one of this brothers.

Husbands was granted a new trial in July 2017 as the Ontario Court of Appeal stated the judge had made a mistake in their decision to deny "rotating triers" in selecting the jury. Husbands's lawyer stated, "He experienced auditory and visual hallucinations. He has no memory of the events that followed inside the food court," arguing that his actions were a result of dissociation, a symptom of post-traumatic stress disorder (PTSD) that stemmed from the stabbing attack prior to the shooting. It was the same defence used during his first trial.

In late November 2019, Husbands was found guilty of two counts of manslaughter, five counts of aggravated assault and one count of criminal negligence causing bodily harm and reckless discharge of a firearm. On the manslaughter convictions, Husbands was sentenced to life in prison with eligibility of parole by 2021.

==== Sears closure to present ====
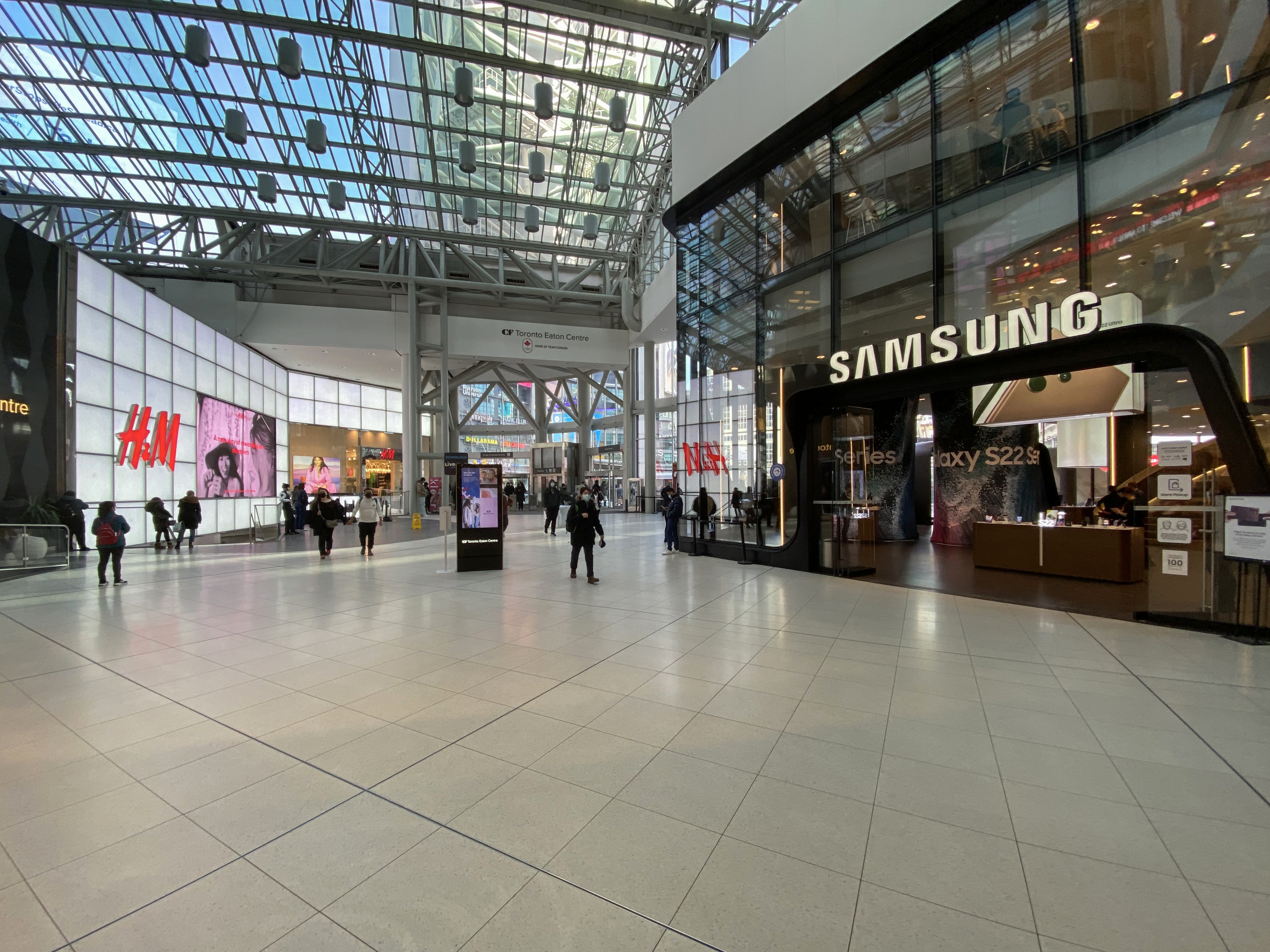
Storefront for the H&M and former Samsung Experience Store from inside the mall in 2022. The right one was one of several that moved into the space vacated by Sears Canada in 2013.

It was announced on October 29, 2013, that Sears Canada would close its flagship location at the mall. On January 15, 2014, Nordstrom announced that it would be taking over some of the space vacated by Sears. The former lower level of Sears (part of Level 1 and part of Level 2 of the mall) was replaced with various retailers, which opened in fall 2015. Examples of these retailers included Winners, Lush and Showcase. Afterwards, a three-floor Nordstrom opened in fall 2016 alongside Uniqlo, an expanded H&M and a Samsung Store. The Samsung Store was closed in fall 2023 and was replaced with a BMO branch that opened in late 2024.

In January 2014, Hudson's Bay Company announced it would sell the Hudson's Bay flagship store complex on Queen Street, including the Simpson Tower offices and Queen Street West location of its namesake department store, to Cadillac Fairview and lease the site for 25 years. Prior to this transaction, the Hudson's Bay Queen Street complex had separate management/ownership and was not considered part of the Eaton Centre, nonetheless, it was connected to the Eaton Centre via a pedestrian bridge and underground Path. After the sale closed, the Queen Street complex department store space was renovated to accommodate the first Canadian location of Saks Fifth Avenue, a chain also owned by Hudson's Bay. The pedestrian bridge over Queen Street linking the Eaton Centre and the Hudson's Bay store, which had been in service since the 1970s, was replaced by a new skywalk that opened in 2017.

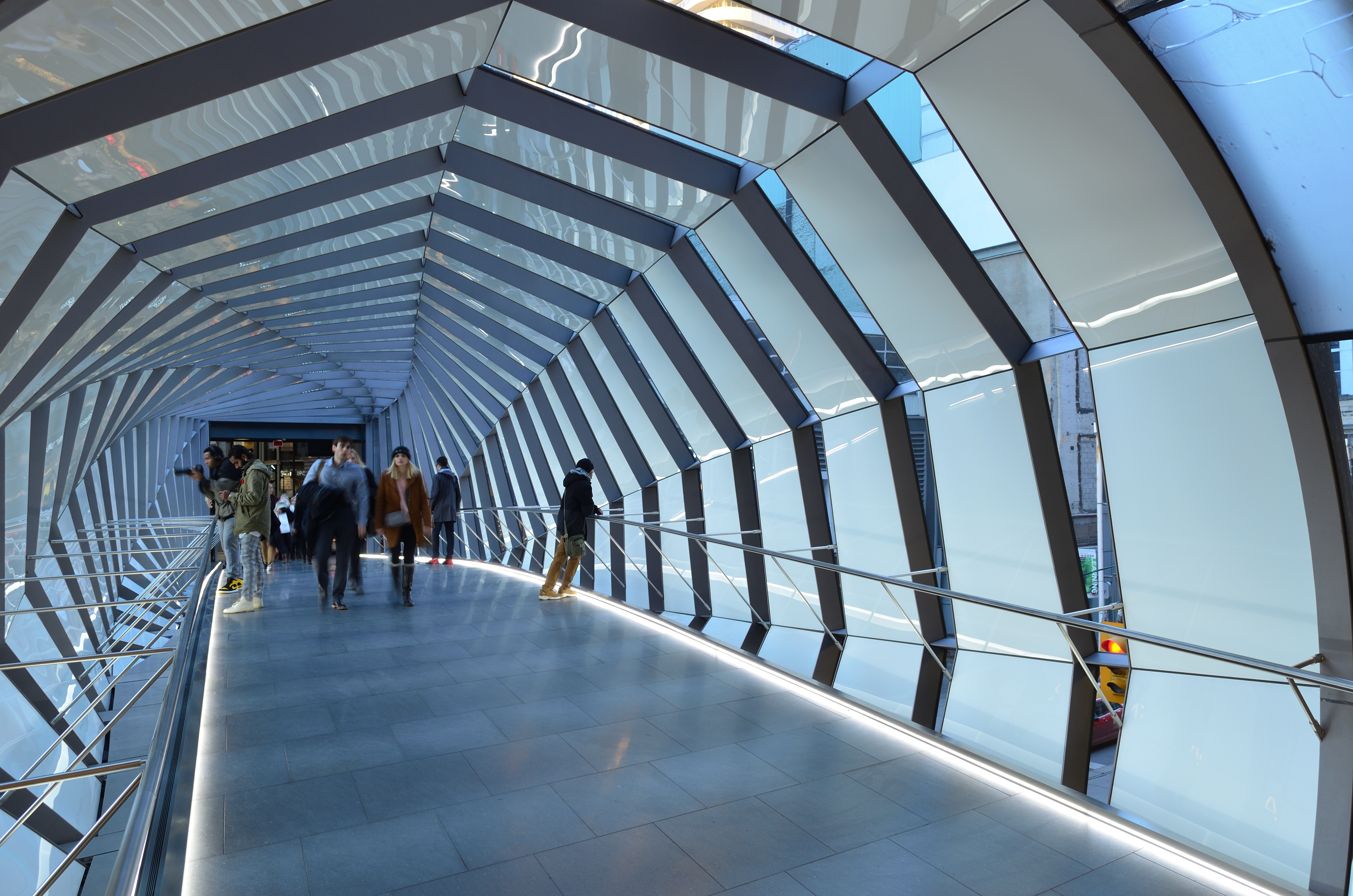
The redesigned skybridge, which was completed in 2017, connecting Eaton Centre to the Hudson's Bay Company's Queen Street location, which became part of the mall complex in 2014

Free Wi-Fi became available throughout the Eaton Centre in late 2014. Before then, free Wi-Fi was only available in larger restaurants, Indigo Books and Music, and the Apple Store. The Eaton Centre's free Wi-Fi requires a Facebook account, an X (formerly Twitter) account, or an e-mail address to access.

A small part of the northern end of the Toronto Eaton Centre's Level 3 was set aside for the official 2015 Pan American Games pop-up shop during June and July 2015, and during the 2015 Parapan American Games in August.

The Toronto Eaton Centre was closed during June 2020 amid both the COVID-19 pandemic and the George Floyd protests and reopened in July 2020. One of the stores above the Urban Eatery was replaced with additional public food court space to allow for social distancing, though that additional food court space closed again amid the second wave of the pandemic per provincial policy as Toronto underwent another COVID-19-related lockdown.

On the evening of September 20, 2022, a multi-vehicle fire occurred in the upper levels of the mall's parking garage and shoppers had to be evacuated.

On March 2, 2023, Nordstrom announced that it would be closing all Canadian stores, including its Eaton Centre location. The store closed on June 13, 2023. From late 2023 to early 2024, the first floor of the former Nordstrom was used as a temporary exhibit themed to the aurora borealis called Canadian Chroma. In June 2024, La Maison Simons, Eataly and Nike announced that they would open in the former Nordstrom area in late 2025.

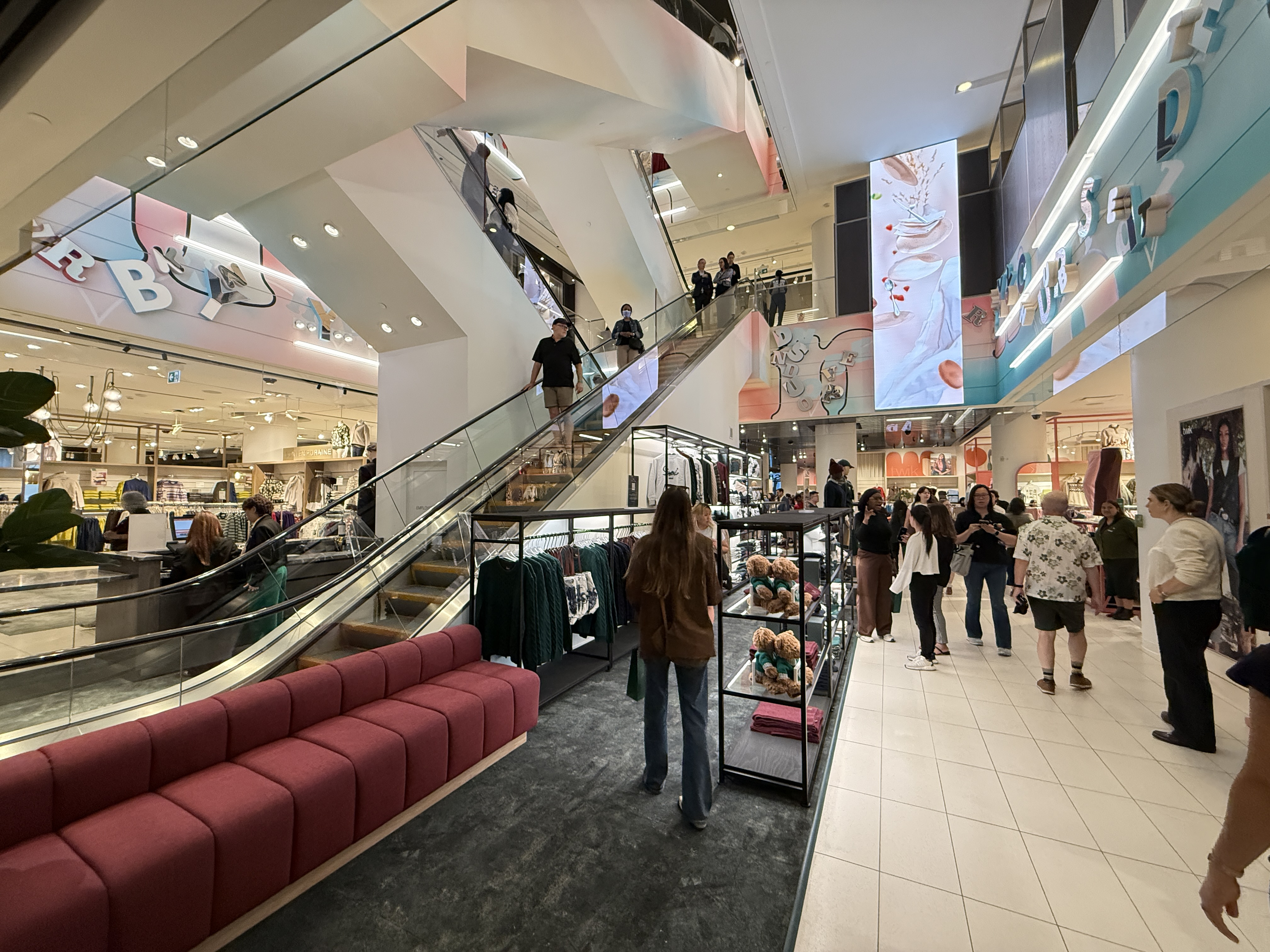
La Maison Simons in former Nordstrom space

In March 2025, Hudson's Bay filed for bankruptcy with all but six stores closing permanently at first. Hudson's Bay Queen Street was among the six remaining open, though all of the six remaining stores would close as well by June 1, 2025.

On September 18, 2025, La Maison Simons opened a 112,000-square-foot, three-storey store in part of the former Nordstrom space. The store is accessible to the Eaton Centre via a new pedestrian walkway from the third floor of the north end of the main part of the mall, and the other walkway at the north end of the mall near the Uniqlo store.

== Food courts ==
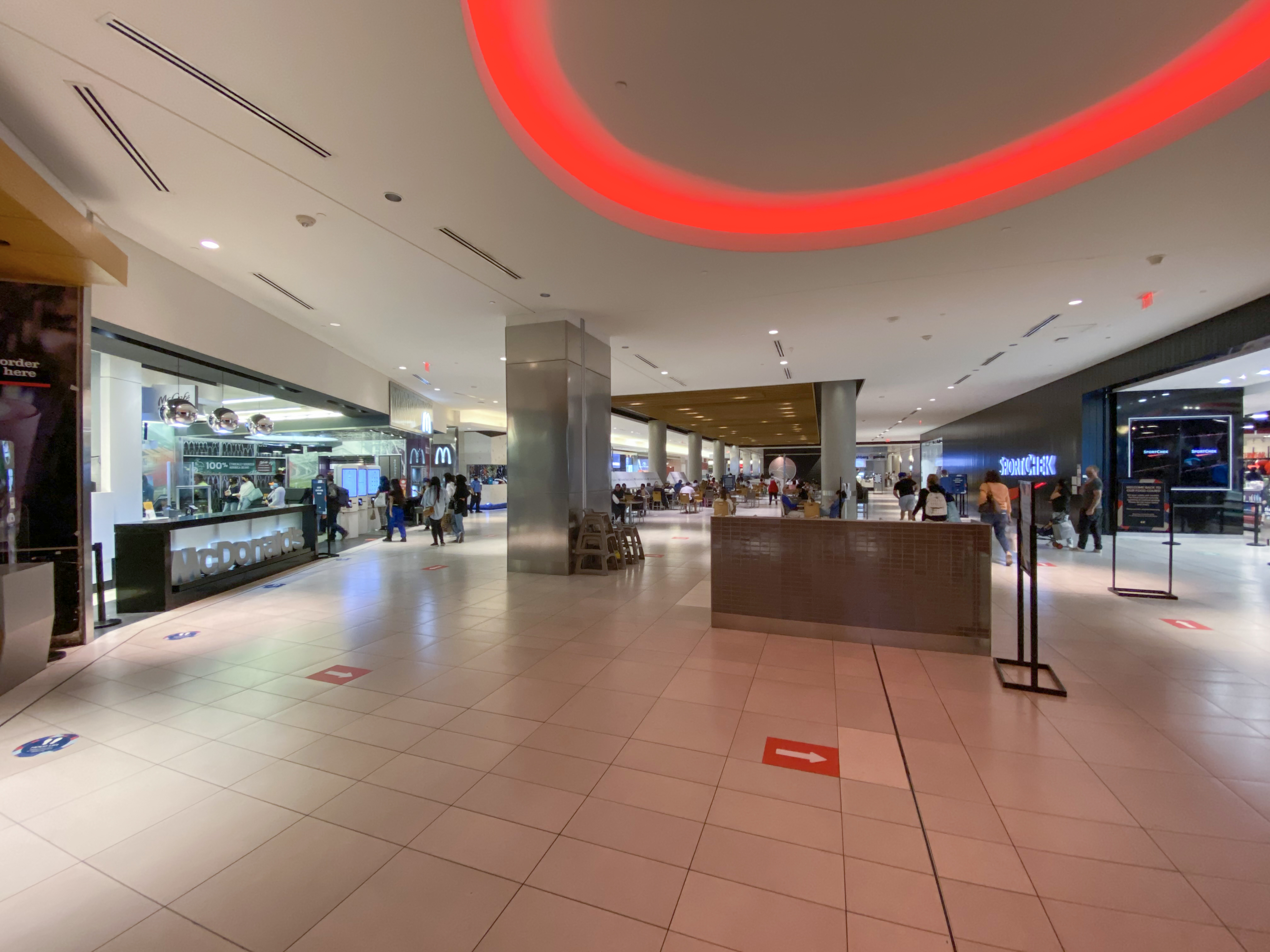
Urban Eatery food court at the Toronto Eaton Centre in 2021

As part of a $120 million renovation, the Eaton Centre replaced the aging food courts at each end of the mall with one larger new food court in the north, which opened in September 2011, and a relocated and expanded Richtree Market restaurant at the south end, which opened on September 9, 2013. However, Richtree Market permanently closed on March 9, 2020, amid the early stages of the COVID-19 pandemic in Toronto and was replaced with Queen's Cross Food Hall.

=== Urban Eatery ===
The new north food court, the Urban Eatery, located under Level 1, features typical food court outlets, outlets of smaller Toronto-based chains, and international-style cuisine. There are 900 seats spread over more than 45,000 ft^{2} (4,200 m^{2}) and 24 outlets within the Eatery. Some of the more notable restaurants in the Eatery include A&W, Chick-fil-A, KFC, McDonald's, New York Fries, Sbarro, and Tim Hortons.

Disposable packaging has been mostly replaced with cutlery and plastic cups and dishes; the area began with over 100,000 dishes and 20,000 cups. There are no garbage or recycling receptacles in the Urban Eatery; patrons bring their food trays to staffed collection stations, where items are sorted. A pulping machine makes 90 percent of the mall's food waste pulpable, and a solid waste compactor reduces the content of 50 bags of garbage into no more than two bags of pulp.

Canadian sporting goods retailer Sport Chek is the only non-food retailer located in the Urban Eatery.

=== Queen's Cross ===
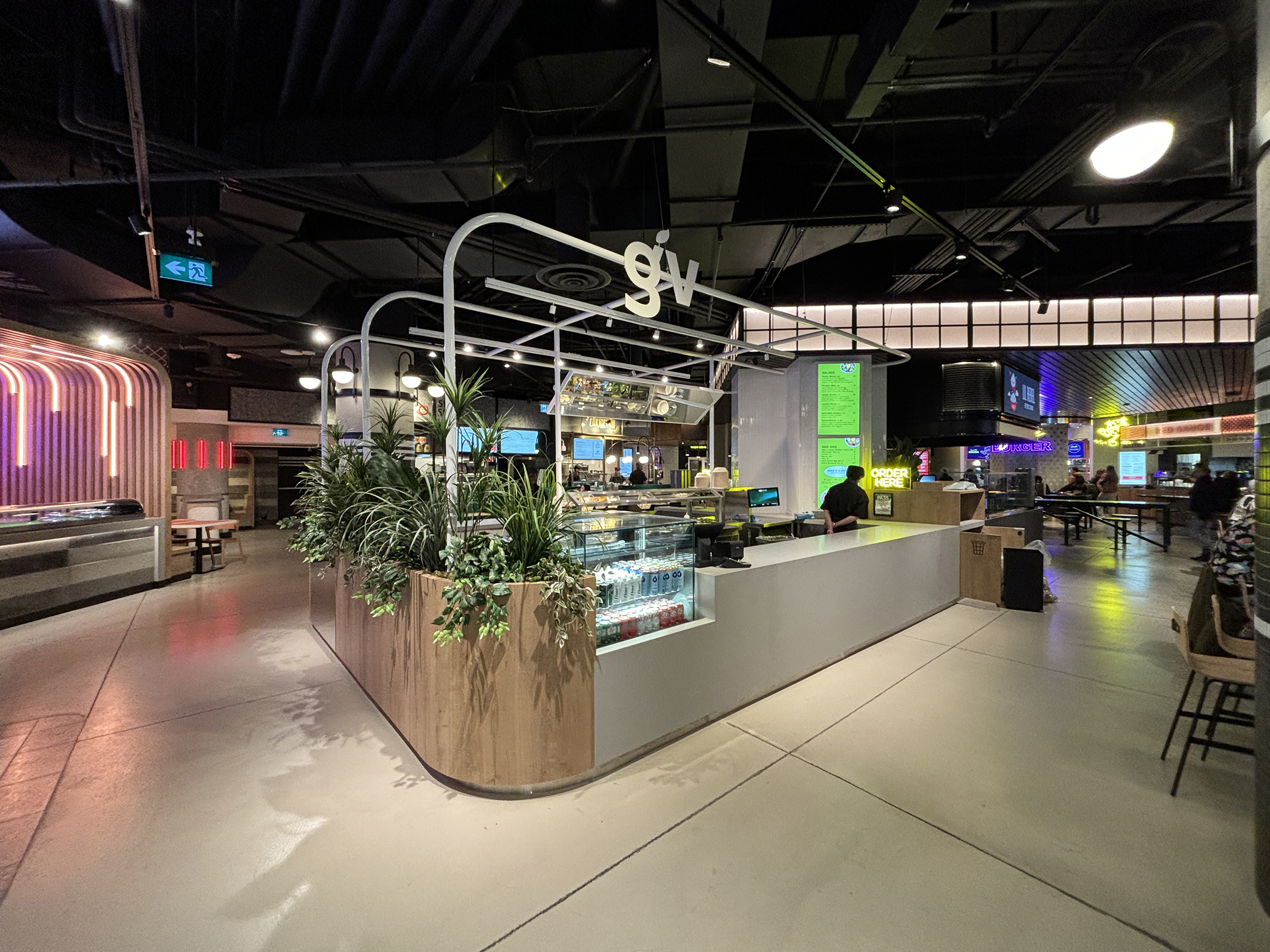
Queen's Cross Food Hall opened in April 2024

On April 24, 2024, the former Richtree Natural Market Restaurant was replaced by Queen's Cross Food Hall. The 1,800-square-metre (19,000 sq ft) food hall is operated by Oliver & Bonacini and provides 13 food stalls, a café and a bar.

== See also ==
- List of largest shopping centres in Canada
  - List of shopping malls in Toronto
