= Georgian Mall =

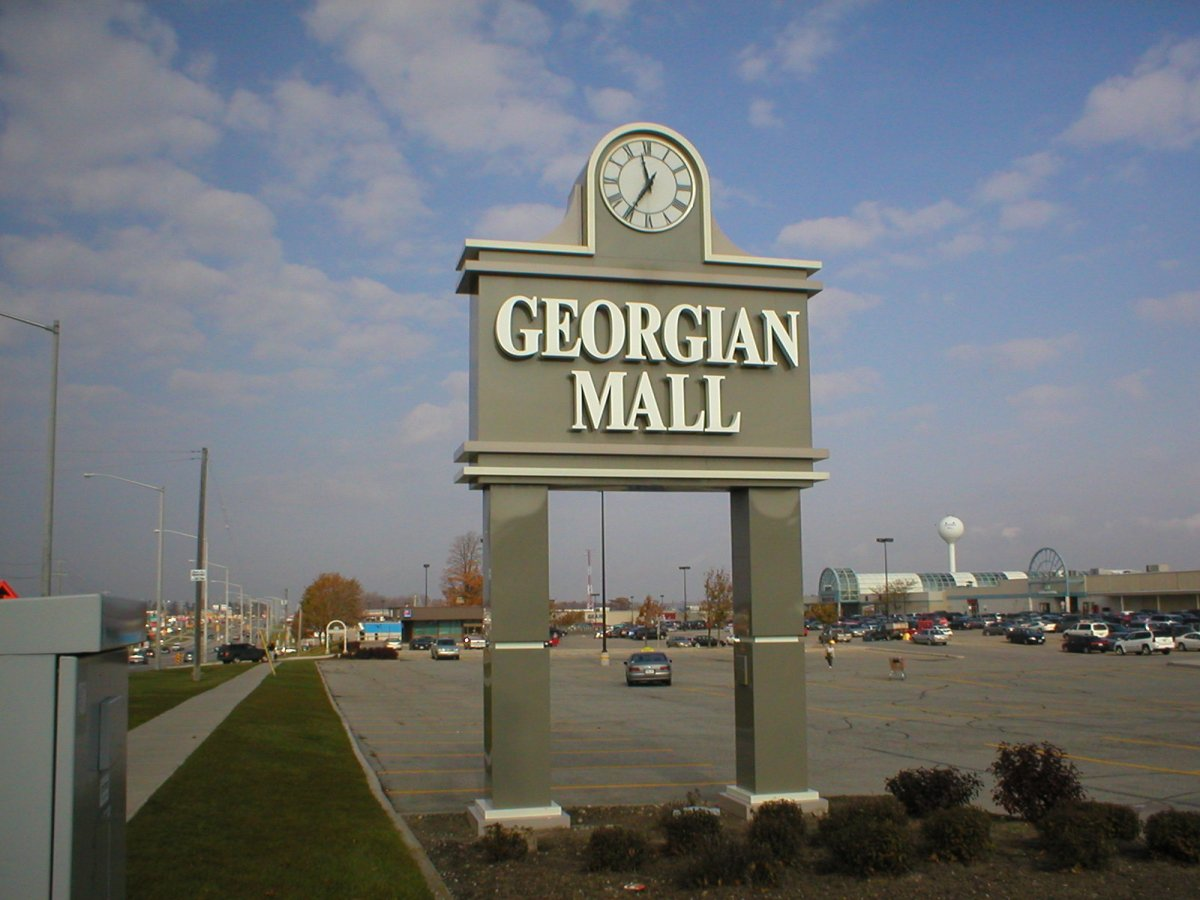
- Georgian Mall in late 2004, prior to renovations
- Coordinates: 44°24′46.63″N 79°42′28.64″W
- Address: 509 Bayfield Street; Barrie, Ontario, Canada; L4M 4Z8
- Developer: Fairview Corporation
- Manager: Jodi Chamberland
- Owner: RioCan Real Estate Investment Trust
- Num. of anchor tenants: 2
- Floor area: 513,000 sq ft (47,700 m^{2})
- Floors: 2
- Website: georgianmall.ca

Georgian Mall is the largest mall in Barrie, Ontario, Canada. It is located on the east side of Bayfield Street, approximately 1.5 km (0.93 mi) north of Highway 400. The anchor store is HomeSense.

== History ==
Georgian Mall opened on August 1, 1973 with Sears as its only department store and Dominion as a supermarket. Next door in a separate development was a free-standing Kmart department store. The first major expansion added a single floor Eaton's as anchor to a new two-level mall addition. (when Eaton's went bankrupt this space was divided into Sport Chek and HomeSense.) The next addition connected the mall to the Kmart building. Kmart was later converted to The Bay. Hudson's Bay eventually closed in 2025. Another former anchor was Sears, which was closed in January 2018.
