= Les Galeries Chagnon =

- Location: Lévis, Quebec, Canada
- Coordinates: 46.7966°N 71.1711°W
- Address: 1200, boulevard Alphonse-Desjardins
- Opened: 1974
- Manager: Westcliff
- Owner: Westcliff
- Num. of stores: 99
- Num. of anchor tenants: 4
- Floor area: 497,652 sq ft (46,233.4 m^{2})
- Floors: 2
- Parking: Outdoor (2,897 spaces)
- Website: www.lesgalerieschagnon.ca/en

Les Galeries Chagnon is an enclosed regional shopping mall in Lévis, Quebec, Canada. It has 106 stores and its floor area is 526,734 square feet (48,935.2 m^{2}). According to a 2006 study, the mall was one of six regional or larger malls in the Quebec metropolitan area, but the only one located south of the Saint Lawrence River.

Les Galeries Chagnon was co-developed at the cost 15 million $ by Cadillac-Fairview and the Greater York Group, both of Toronto. It opened in 1974 as a two-level enclosed shopping centre of 515,000 square feet with 65 stores.

On March 29, 2012, Target Canada announced its first 12 locations in Quebec to take over existing Zellers outlets and this initial selection included the store at Les Galeries Chagnon. On September 17, 2013, Target opened its store at Les Galeries Chagnon, the company's first location in the Quebec City area. Target eventually exited the Canadian market and the store at Les Galeries Chagnon was one of 13 bought by Walmart Canada in 2015.

== Anchor tenants ==
- Renaud-Bray
- Sports Experts/Atmosphere
- Walmart
