= Richtree Market =

Defunct Canadian restaurant chain

- Type: Public
- Traded as: TSX: MOO.b (1997-2020)
- Industry: Food service
- Genre: Casual restaurant
- Predecessor: Movenpick Canada (1982-1996)
- Founded: 1996; 30 years ago
- Founders: Jörg and Marian Reichert
- Defunct: March 9, 2020; 6 years ago
- Fate: Closure due to COVID-19 pandemic
- Headquarters: Toronto, Ontario, Canada
- Number of locations: 11 (at height in 2014)
- Products: Market-type food
- Owner: Catalyst Capital
- Number of employees: ~100
- Website: Last snapshot of official website in February 2020

Richtree Market was a Canadian restaurant chain, which approximates the style of a European market. At its height in 2014, the company had 11 locations throughout eastern Canada. Its last location closed in March 2020 at the start of the COVID-19 pandemic.

== Description ==
=== Marché ===
The chain offered casual dining and takeout service, with limited grocery stores and special items for children. Menu items are inspired by foods of Europe and Asia. Locations seat approximately 120 people.

== History ==
=== Movenpick Canada ===
The company traces it roots to its predecessor Movenpick Canada, the Canadian subsidiary of the Swiss-based Mövenpick, which opened its first restaurant, a traditional table service Mövenpick, on York Street in 1980. In 1982, Hans Jorg Reichert was transferred from Zürich to Toronto to manage the Canadian subsidiary. As manager, Reichert imported a new moderate-priced upscale European-style self-serve restaurant concept based upon an open market which was called Mövenpick Marché, which first opened in Stuttgart in 1983. The first Canadian Mövenpick Marché opened in Brookfield Place, formerly BCE Place, in 1992.

=== Richtree ===
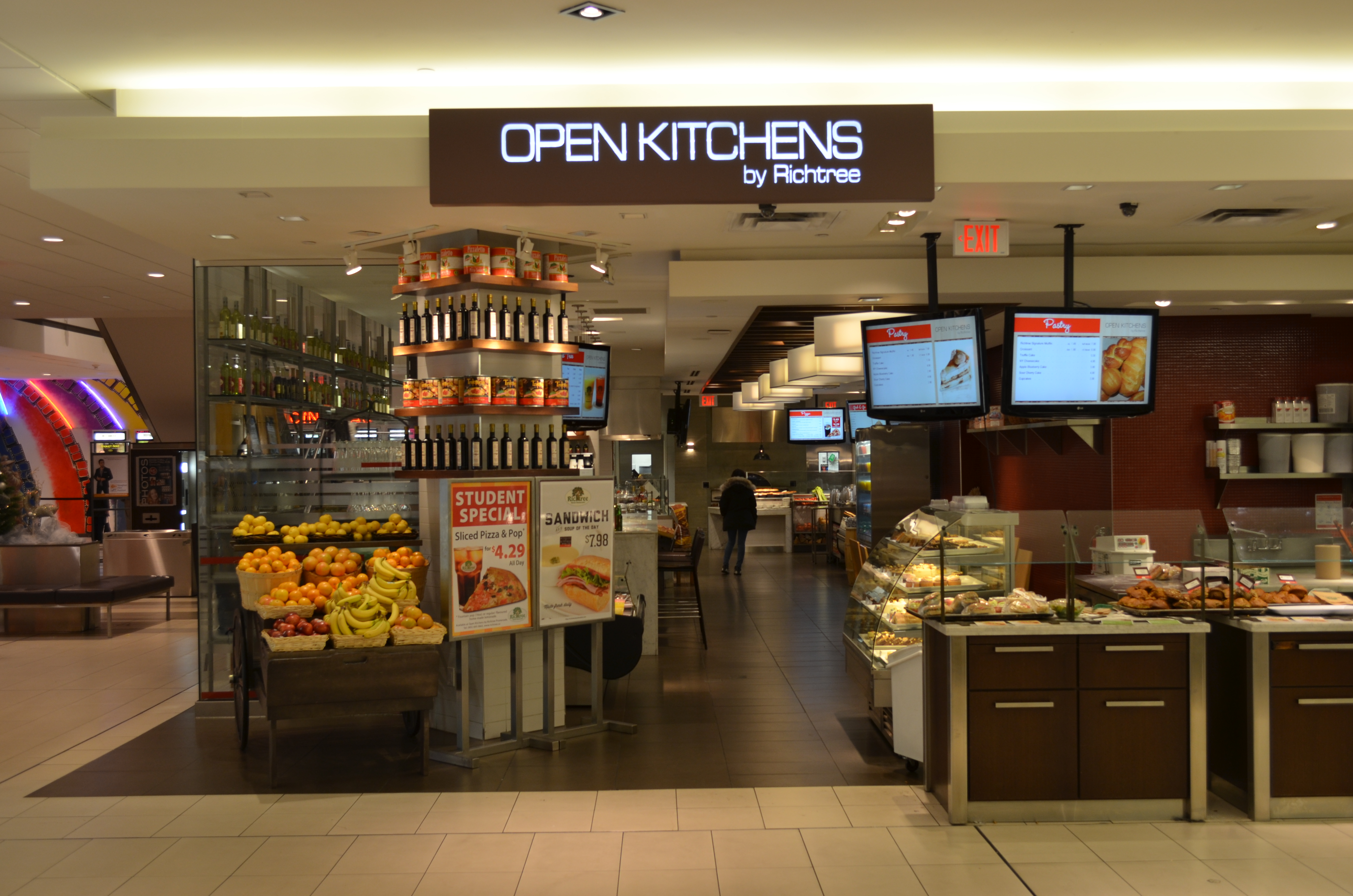
Richtree in Promenade (2013)

After growing the subsidiary within the Toronto metropolitan area, Reichert convinced his Swiss bosses that everyone would make more money if the Canadian restaurants were sold to him and operated under a franchise agreement. In 1996, Reichert formed Richtree Market Restaurants Inc. to purchase the Movenpick restaurants in Canada and the franchise rights for North America. To fuel the new company's rapid expansion, Richtree became a public stock company in February 1997 by selling stock on the Toronto Stock Exchange under the stock symbol MOO.b.

The company had one owned-and-operated location at Square One, Mississauga, Ontario, Canada.

The flagship, downtown Toronto location, at Brookfield Place (formerly BCE Place), went out of business in January 2010. Mövenpick returned to Canada and reopened the location back under the Mövenpick Marché name. In April 2020, Mövenpick's Canadian subsidiary filed for bankruptcy and closed all its Canadian restaurants.

Richtree closed their restaurant locations in College Park in Toronto, Rideau Centre in Ottawa, Bayview & York Mills in Toronto, and Promenade in Vaughan.

Richtree's last restaurant, located at the Toronto Eaton Centre, closed on March 9, 2020.

== See also ==
- Last snapshot of official website in February 2020
- List of Canadian restaurant chains
