= TD Terrace =

Office building in Toronto

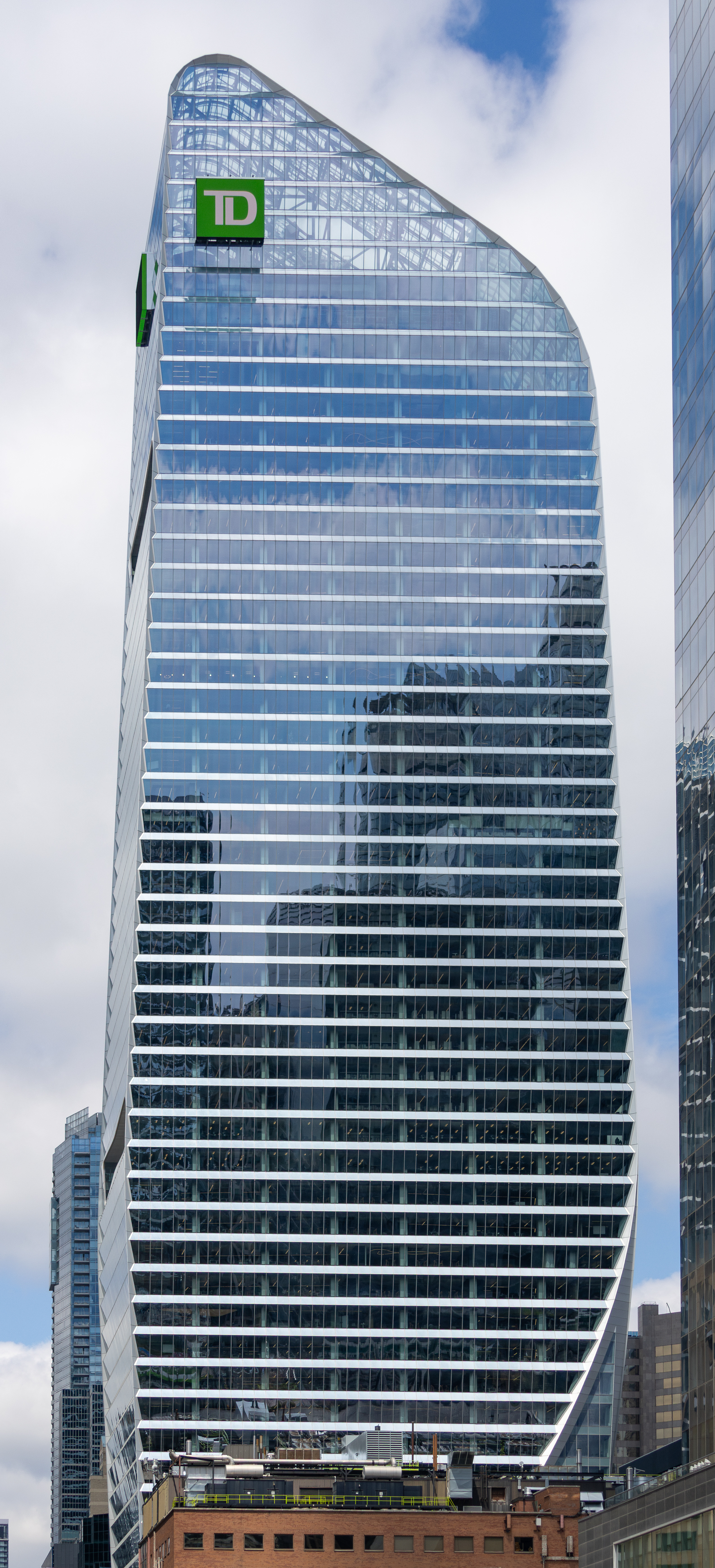
- TD Terrace

General information
- Location: 160 Front Street West; Toronto, Ontario, Canada
- Coordinates: 43°38′43″N 79°23′05″W
- Opened: 2024
- Owner: Cadillac Fairview

Height
- Height: 236.5 metres (776 ft)

Design and construction
- Architect: Adrian Smith + Gordon Gill Architecture
- Developer: Cadillac Fairview

TD Terrace is a commercial skyscraper near the Financial District of Toronto, Ontario, Canada. Located at northeast corner of the intersection of Front Street and Simcoe Street, TD Terrace is an office space for and a branch of Toronto-Dominion Bank. The building also includes offices of the Ontario Teachers' Pension Plan.

The 236.5-metre (776 ft) tall skyscraper is owned and was developed by Cadillac Fairview and designed by Adrian Smith + Gordon Gill Architecture. It is one of the tallest buildings in Canada.

TD Terrace opened in 2024.
