= Arcadian Court =

Coordinates: 43°39′07″N 79°22′50″W

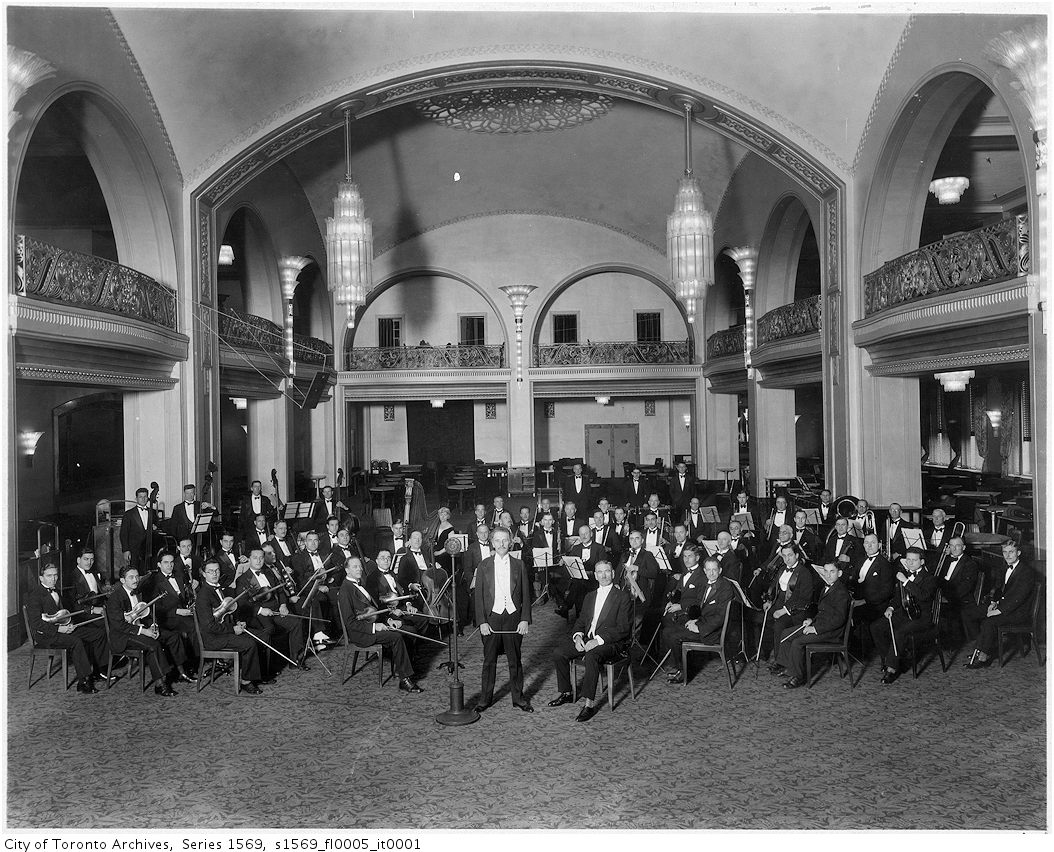
The Toronto Symphony Orchestra broadcasting from Arcadian Court, 1929

The Arcadian Court is an Art Deco event space in Toronto, Ontario, Canada. It is located on the eighth floor of the Simpson Tower at Yonge and Queen Streets. For many years, it was an exclusive restaurant, then an art gallery, then closed and used for storage. It was restored and is now used as an event space.

The facility first opened in 1929, when the store was part of the Simpson's chain. The Arcadian Court was intended to compete with the Royal York Hotel's Imperial Room, the Georgian Room at the main Eaton's store, and the Eaton's Seventh Floor on College Street (now called The Carlu) for downtown lunch business. The Court was two stories in height, the main floor and a mezzanine (called "The Men's Grill" from 1968–1969), which was men-only for many years. The restaurant's architecture featured wrought iron railings, arched windows, and huge chandeliers. Three skylights allow light to enter the whitewash hall interior. At its opening, it was the largest department store restaurant in the world, seating 1,300. The restaurant hosted many of the Toronto Symphony Orchestra's first radio broadcasts, and in 1967, it hosted the first auction ever held outside Britain by Sotheby's.

In 1978, Simpson's was acquired by the Hudson's Bay Company, and subsequently became downtown Toronto's flagship Bay store in 1991. The Bay went out of business in 2025. From 1988 to 1989, some of the mezzanine space was converted to gallery space, which displayed the Canadian art collection of Kenneth Thomson. Much of the second floor of the Arcadian Court was closed off or used for the storage of chairs. A small pictorial display and a cast-iron fountain is located outside the hall. This gallery space was closed in 2004, and the Thomson collection was transferred to the Art Gallery of Ontario and now displayed as the Thomson Collection.

Reopened in May 2012, the Arcadian Court is now a part of a larger event complex (which now includes the neighboring Arcadian Loft) called "Arcadian", which is operated by Oliver & Bonacini Events. The renovations were carried out by architecture firm DeSignum Design. The renovations have stripped back layers of walls and flooring that have been added over the years, reclaiming approximately 5 feet (1.5 m) of the perimeter. The arches were also restored. Eight of the 16 grand arches in the mezzanine that were closed off in past renovations were reopened and the squared-off arches were restored. The renovations added 4 feet (1.2 m) in height to the remaining eight. The Court is now 8,086 square feet (751.2 m^{2}) with improved acoustics, new chandeliers that are a deconstructed take on the original Lalique crystal chandeliers and an opened-up mezzanine.

The "Arcadian Court" name carried on as a brand name for other restaurants operated in Bay stores, though none were as opulent or exclusive as the Toronto original was. The Arcadian Court also figures prominently in Margaret Atwood's novel The Blind Assassin, as the center of Toronto's high society to which Iris Chase Griffen is introduced. On November 18, 2022, Trinity College at the University of Toronto hosted its 85th annual Saints Ball at the Arcadian Court, a prestigious philanthropic event that supports a different charitable cause every year.

== See also ==
- The Bay Queen Street
