= McAllister Place =

Shopping mall in New Brunswick, Canada

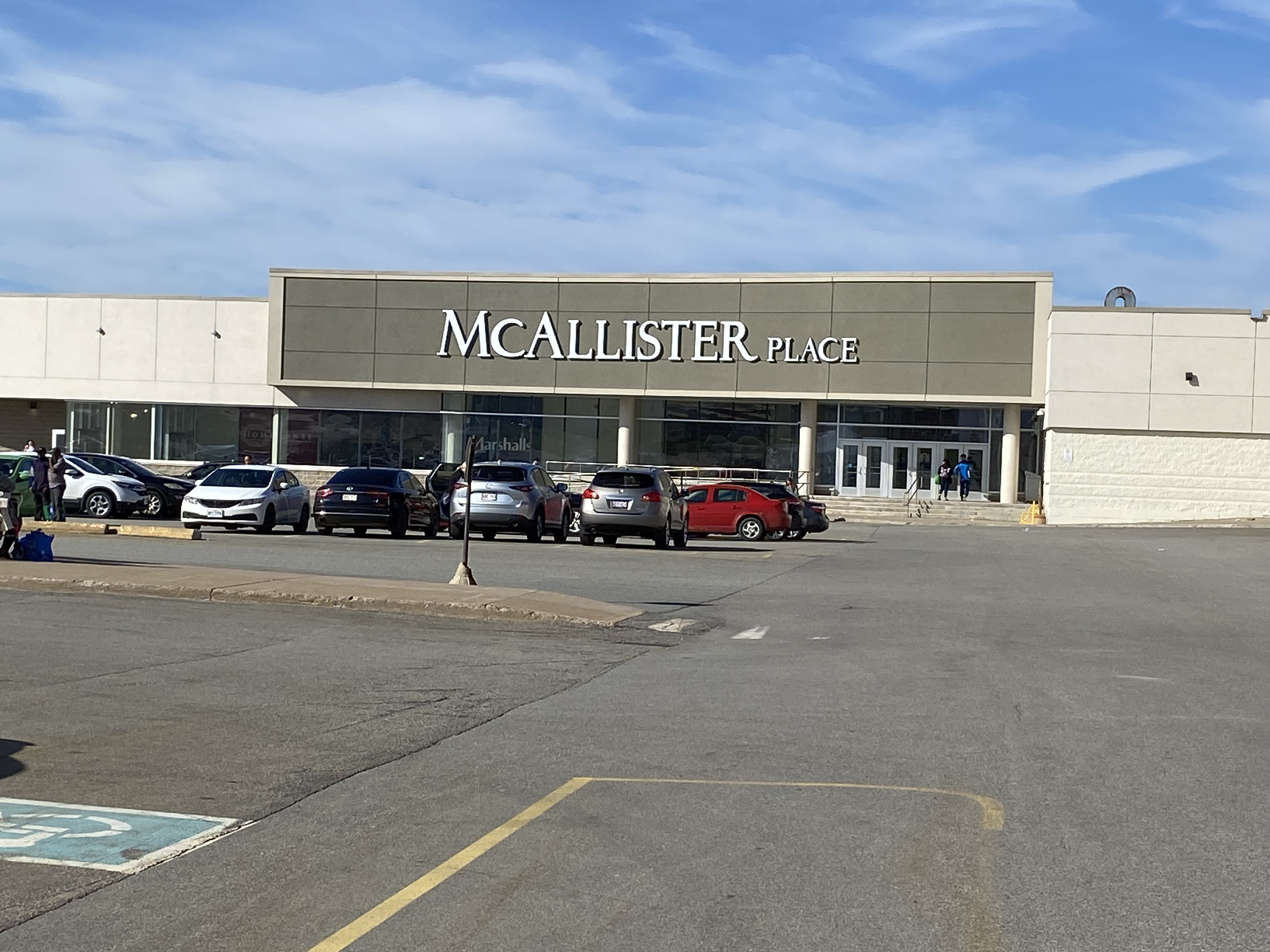
- Location: Saint John, New Brunswick, Canada
- Coordinates: 45.3074°N 66.0164°W
- Address: 519 Westmorland Road
- Opened: July 30, 1975; 51 years ago
- Owner: Smart Investment Ltd.
- Num. of stores: 110 (2009)
- Floor area: 483,000 sq ft (44,900 m^{2})
- Floors: 1
- Website: mcallisterplace.ca

McAllister Place is a shopping mall located in Saint John, New Brunswick, Canada. Officially opening with five stores on July 30, 1975, McAllister Place has a retail floor area of 483,000 square feet (44,900 m^{2}) and featured 110 stores as of 2009. It is the largest mall located in Saint John.

== Description ==
McAllister Place is located in Saint John, New Brunswick and is owned by Smart Investment Ltd. It has a retail floor area of 483,000 square feet (44,900 m^{2}) and featured 110 stores as of 2009. McAllister Place is located in an area prone to flooding, which has resulted in the parking lot and mall being affected.

== History ==
McAllister Place was officially opened on the morning of July 30, 1975. Established by the Rocca Group Ltd., the shopping center initially had a floor size of 59,000 square feet (5,500 m^{2}) and featured five stores as well as a Royal Bank of Canada location. The following year, the mall expanded by another 10,000 square feet.

On November 30, 2012, McAllister Place, as well as Regent Mall in Fredericton, were acquired by Primaris REIT in a $317.6 million purchase deal with Cadillac Fairview. On June 3, 2026, Primaris sold the shopping center to Smart Investment Ltd. for $64 million.

In 2019, McAllister Place started working on a 100,000 square foot expansion following the 2018 closure of a Sears store.
