= Simpson Tower =

Coordinates: 43.651987°N 79.381229°W

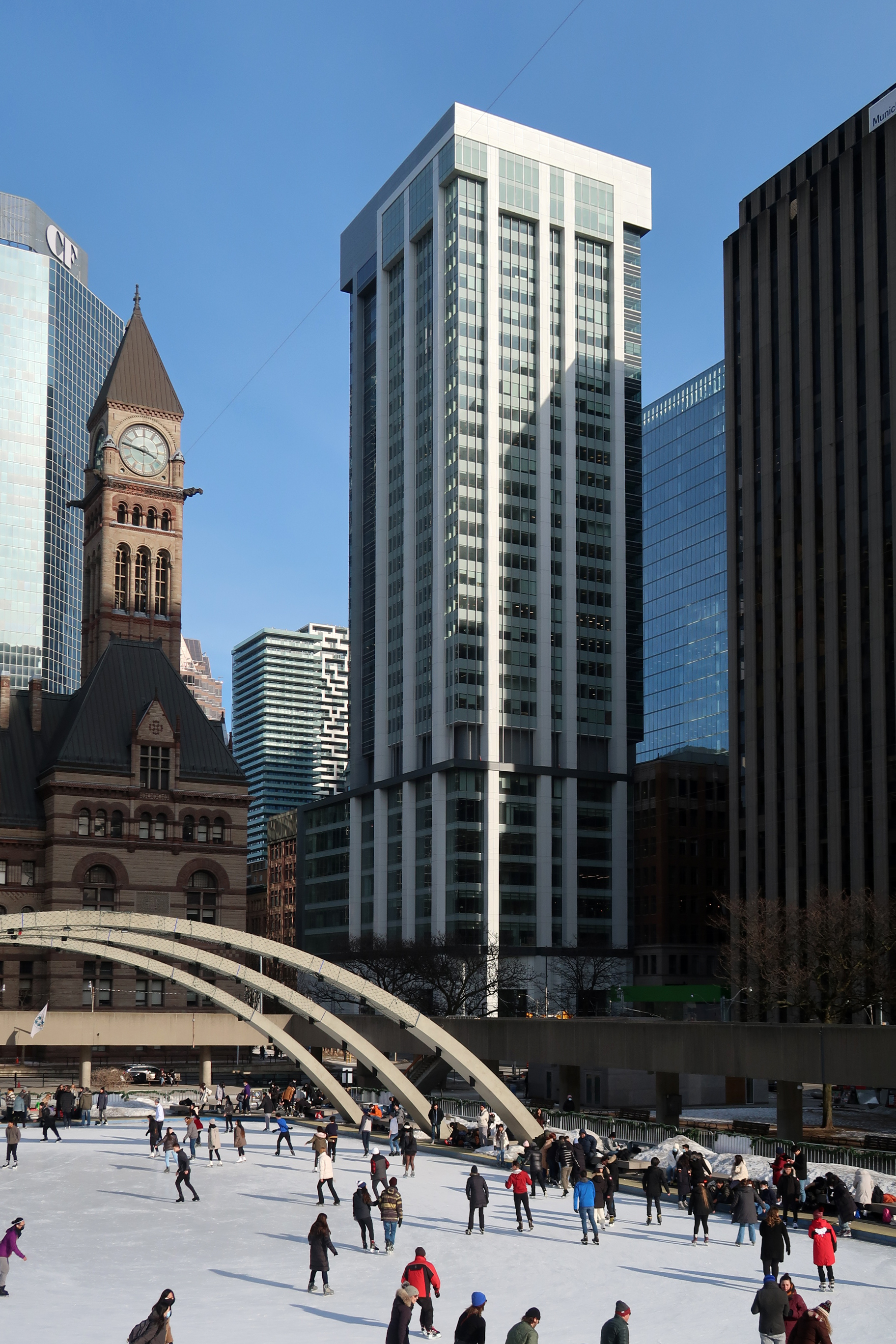
- Simpson Tower in 2022
- Interactive map of the Simpson Tower area

General information
- Status: Completed
- Location: 401 Bay Street; Toronto, Ontario; M5H 2Y4
- Completed: 1968

Height
- Roof: 144 m (472 ft)

Technical details
- Floor count: 33

Design and construction
- Architecture firm: John B. Parkin Associates; Bregman & Hamann

The Simpson Tower, located at 401 Bay Street, is the 38th-tallest building in Toronto, Ontario, Canada. Completed in 1968 by John B. Parkin Associates and Bregman & Hamann, as the headquarters of the Simpsons department store company, it has 33 floors and is 144 m (472 ft) high. In 1978, as part of a corporate takeover, the Simpson Tower became the property of the Hudson's Bay Company. The building was the head office of HBC and also housed the head office of subsidiary Hudson's Bay until 2025 with the liquidation of the department store. The building includes event venue Arcadian Court and is integrated with the Eaton Centre across Queen Street.

In January 2014, Hudson's Bay Company announced it would sell the tower and adjacent store to Cadillac Fairview and lease the site for 25 years.

The tower was reclad in 2017.
