= Cadillac Fairview =

Operators of commercial real estate

The Cadillac Fairview Corporation Limited
- Type: Subsidiary
- Industry: Real estate
- Founded: 1974; 52 years ago
- Headquarters: 20 Queen Street West; 5th Floor; Toronto, Ontario; M5H 3R4
- Area served: Canada
- Key people: Salvatore (Sal) Iacono (president and CEO)
- Parent: Ontario Teachers' Pension Plan
- Website: www.cadillacfairview.com

The Cadillac Fairview Corporation Limited, branded as Cadillac Fairview, is a Canadian company that invests in, owns, and manages commercial real estate, mainly in Canada and the United States. As of March 2017, the company had 73 properties, encompassing 50 million square feet, worth over $40 billion. As of September 2017, Cadillac Fairview's portfolio consisted of 60% Canadian retail (mainly major shopping centres) and 26% Canadian office buildings. Cadillac Fairview is wholly owned by the Ontario Teachers' Pension Plan.

== History ==
The name "Cadillac Fairview" came into existence in 1974 as a result of the merger between Cadillac Development Corporation Ltd and Fairview Corporation. Cadillac Development Corporation was founded by partners Ephraim Diamond (d. 2008), Joseph Berman (1922–2003), and Jack Kamin in Toronto in 1953 as a developer of high-rise apartment buildings. Fairview Corporation was established in 1958 as the real estate division of Cemp Investments, the holding company of the Bronfman family. Before merging, Cadillac and Fairview had already had strong ties since 1968. Bronfman-held Cemp Investments sold Cadillac Fairview in 1986.

The company was purchased by the Ontario Teachers' Pension Plan in March 2000. In 2006, it expanded its operations to Brazil by buying 46 percent of Multiplan Emprendimentos Imobiliarios SA, a Brazilian shopping centre manager worth more than $1 billion. In 2012, Cadillac Fairview bought out the leases of Sears Canada in five stores for $400 million, including the lease of the flagship Sears at Toronto Eaton Centre. Many of the former Sears locations, including the one at Eaton Centre, became Nordstrom. In 2014, it purchased the Toronto flagship store of Hudson's Bay Company for $650 million.

On September 21, 2015, Cadillac Fairview rebranded its shopping centre properties, adding the prefix "CF" in front of each shopping centre name and phasing out individual mall logos in favour of a standardized logo format and image campaign. In January 2017, Cadillac Fairview sold a 50% interest in its Vancouver portfolio to the Ontario Pension Board and the Workplace Safety and Insurance Board. Financial terms were not disclosed, but the deal involved 4 million square feet of leasable space in the Pacific Centre and 12 office properties. In September 2017, it announced that it would become a national partner to the Canadian Olympic Committee.

In December 2022, Cadillac Fairview purchased a 25% shareholding in Stanhope plc.

=== Privacy issues ===
In July 2018, Cadillac Fairview disclosed that it had been employing facial recognition technology via embedded cameras on their mall directory kiosks, which collected anonymized information of the estimated age and gender of customers. The company stated that this information was being used to analyze mall traffic. Following an investigation by CBC News and the announcement of a government probe, Cadillac Fairview suspended the program.

On October 29, 2020, the federal privacy commissioner and his counterparts in Alberta and B.C. released a report detailing Cadillac Fairview's use of anonymous video analytics (AVA) to collect personally-identifiable information from mall visitors without meaningful consent. It found that at 12 properties, the company had used 5 million images from such kiosks to generate biometric representations of visitors' faces. It was also found that the biometric data had unknowingly been compiled into a database by a third-party technology provider "for no apparent purpose and with no justification", which "compounded the risk of potential use by unauthorized parties or, in the case of a data breach, by malicious actors". The report concluded that Cadillac Fairview had complied with their recommendations, with the exception of those "that speculate about hypothetical future uses of similar technology".

Cadillac Fairview defended the program, arguing that the cameras' use were covered by a general privacy notice located on entrance signage (which warned that premises were monitored for safety and security reasons, and referred users to a company privacy policy on the company website), that the images themselves were only stored temporarily for analysis before being deleted, and that they could not individually identify a visitor.

== Properties ==
Cadillac Fairview owns, develops, and manages property, malls and large office and retail spaces across the Western Hemisphere, mostly in North America. Cadillac Fairview has also developed suburban housing, such as the Erin Mills "New Town". Among its Canadian assets are five Quebec properties, twenty-five Ontario properties, two Manitoba properties, eight Alberta properties, and fourteen British Columbia properties.

Cadillac Fairview's malls are generally large and high-quality, with high-end stores and high sales per square foot. For instance, sales at the Toronto Eaton Centre, a CF mall, were $1500 per square foot, while lower-end malls have sales closer to $325 per square foot. Cadillac Fairview has actively tried to sell weak malls, reducing its mall count from a high of 40 to around 20 in 2017.

Notable properties managed by Cadillac Fairview, some co-owned with (or managed on behalf of) other investors, are listed below.

Property name	Location	Property type	Year opened
Carrefour Laval	Laval, Quebec	Shopping centre	1974
Chinook Centre	Calgary, Alberta	Shopping centre	1960
Fairview Mall	Toronto (North York), Ontario	Shopping centre	1970
Fairview Pointe-Claire	Pointe-Claire, Quebec	Shopping centre	1965
Market Mall	Calgary, Alberta	Shopping centre	1971
Markville Shopping Centre	Markham, Ontario	Shopping centre	1982
Masonville Place	London, Ontario	Shopping centre	1985
Pacific Centre	Vancouver, British Columbia	Shopping centre and office towers	1971
Polo Park	Winnipeg, Manitoba	Shopping centre	1959
Richmond Centre	Richmond, British Columbia	Shopping centre	1964
Rideau Centre	Ottawa, Ontario	Shopping centre and office tower	1983
Sherway Gardens	Toronto (Etobicoke), Ontario	Shopping centre	1971
16 York Street	Toronto, Ontario	Office tower	2019
Shops at Don Mills	Toronto, Ontario	Shopping centre	2009
Deloitte Tower	Montreal, Quebec	Office tower	2015
Maple Leaf Square	Toronto, Ontario	Multi-use complex	2010
RBC Centre	Toronto, Ontario	Office tower	2009
Simcoe Place	Toronto, Ontario	Office tower with retail concourse	1995
TD Terrace	Toronto, Ontario	Office tower	2024
Toronto-Dominion Centre	Toronto, Ontario	Office complex with retail concourse	1969
Toronto Eaton Centre	Toronto, Ontario	Shopping centre and office towers	1977
Waterfront Station	Vancouver, British Columbia	Transportation facility	1914
Windsor Station	Montreal, Quebec	Office and retail complex; former railway station	1889

=== Notable former properties ===
Property name	Location	Property type	Year opened
The Bay Centre	Victoria, British Columbia	Shopping centre	1989
Champlain Place	Dieppe, New Brunswick	Shopping centre	1974
Erin Mills Town Centre	Mississauga (Erin Mills), Ontario	Shopping centre	1989
Fairview Park Mall	Kitchener, Ontario	Shopping centre	1966
Galeries d'Anjou	Montreal (Anjou), Quebec	Shopping centre	1968
Galeries Chagnon	Lévis, Quebec	Shopping centre	1974
Georgian Mall	Barrie, Ontario	Shopping centre	1973
Lime Ridge Mall	Hamilton, Ontario	Shopping centre	1981
McAllister Place	Saint John, New Brunswick	Shopping Centre	1978
Place Montréal Trust	Montreal, Quebec	Shopping centre	1988
Promenade Shopping Centre	Thornhill, Ontario	Shopping centre	1986
Promenades St-Bruno	Saint-Bruno-de-Montarville, Quebec	Shopping centre	1978
Regent Mall	Fredericton, New Brunswick	Shopping centre	1976
The Galleria at White Plains	White Plains, New York	Shopping centre	1980
Woodbine Centre	Toronto (Etobicoke, Rexdale), Ontario	Shopping centre	1985
