= Hudson's Bay (department store) =

Canadian department store chain

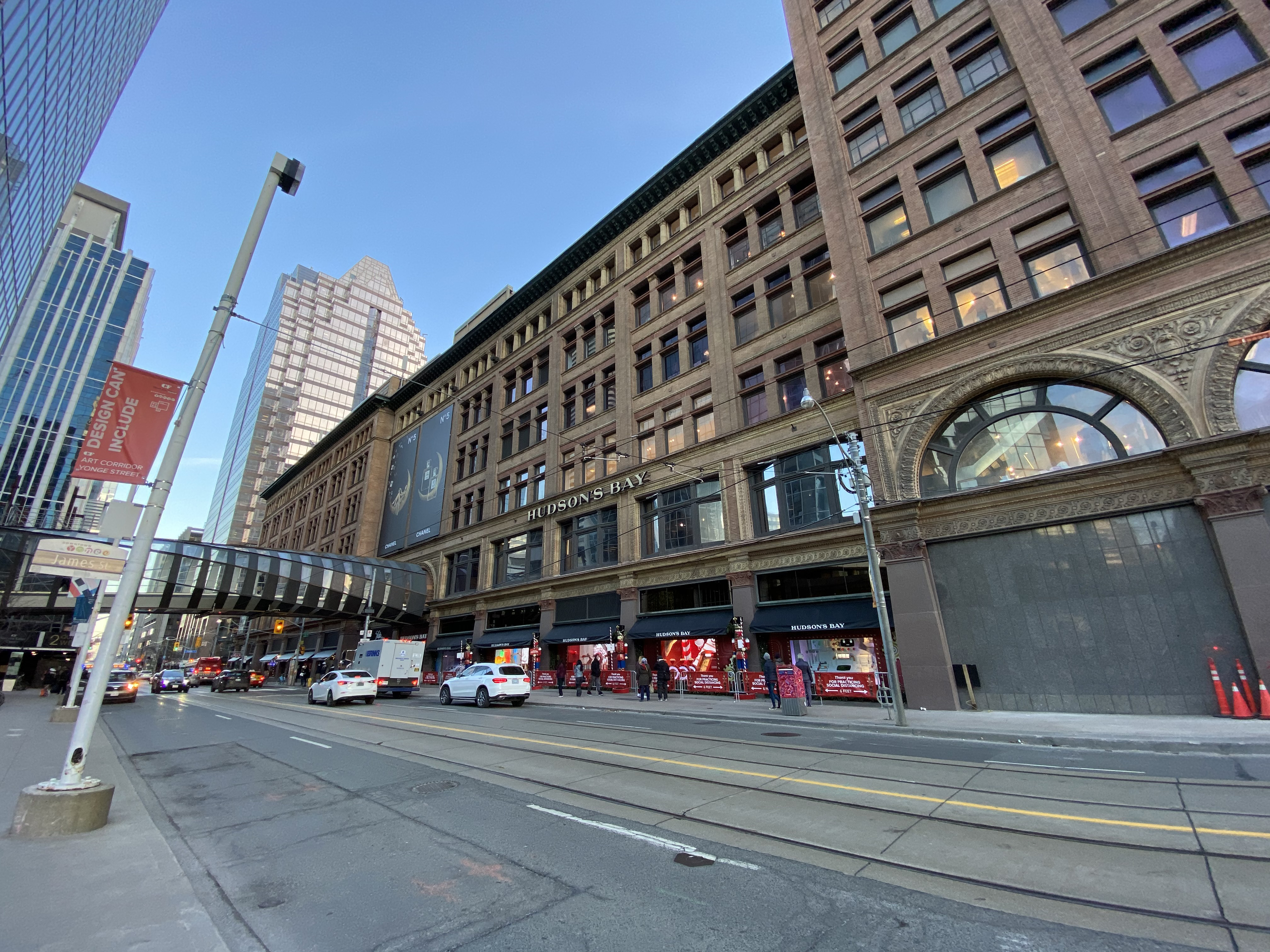
- Exterior of the Hudson's Bay flagship store in downtown Toronto
- Formerly: Hudson's Bay Company (1881–1965); The Bay (1965–2013)
- Type: Division
- Industry: Retail
- Genre: Department stores
- Founded: 2 May 1670; 356 years ago (Hudson's Bay Company); 1881; 145 years ago in Winnipeg, Manitoba (first department store)
- Defunct: 1 June 2025; 17 months ago
- Fate: Creditor protection and liquidation
- Headquarters: Simpson Tower, Toronto, Ontario, Canada
- Number of locations: 80 (at closing, 2025)
- Area served: Canada
- Products: Clothing; footwear; bedding; bath; furniture; jewellery; beauty products; electronics; appliances; housewares; tools
- Parent: Hudson's Bay Company
- Website: thebay.com

Hudson's Bay ("the Bay") (Note: French: La Baie d'Hudson ("la Baie")) (Note: Hudson's Bay was named the Bay from 1965 until 2013, and its online division was named the Bay from 2021 until recombining with the brick-and-mortar division in 2022. The Bay name was used online from 2021 until its liquidation in 2025, and the name is still used colloquially when referencing the department store.) was a Canadian department store chain that was the flagship brand of the Hudson's Bay Company (HBC), the oldest company in North America. The first department store opened in Winnipeg, Manitoba. The chain mainly served Western Canada at first. However, it achieved a national footprint with the acquisition and conversion of the Freimans, Morgan's, Simpsons, and Woodward's department stores in the latter half of the 20th century.

Its headquarters and flagship store were located at the Hudson's Bay Centre in Toronto from 1974 until relocating its headquarters to the Simpson Tower in 1978, and converting the adjacent Simpsons flagship store into the Bay flagship store in 1991. Historical buildings including the former Henry Morgan Building in Montreal and the Bay Building in Vancouver were also flagship stores for the Bay. The flagship stores in Edmonton, Winnipeg, and the Hudson's Bay Centre store closed in the early 2020s due to the COVID-19 pandemic.

HBC filed for creditor protection in March 2025, and began liquidating all but six Hudson's Bay stores in Ontario and Quebec. The remaining stores, however, began liquidating in April 2025 after failing to find a buyer to keep them afloat, and all stores were closed by 1 June 2025. Canadian Tire acquired HBC's intellectual property, including Hudson's Bay.

== History ==
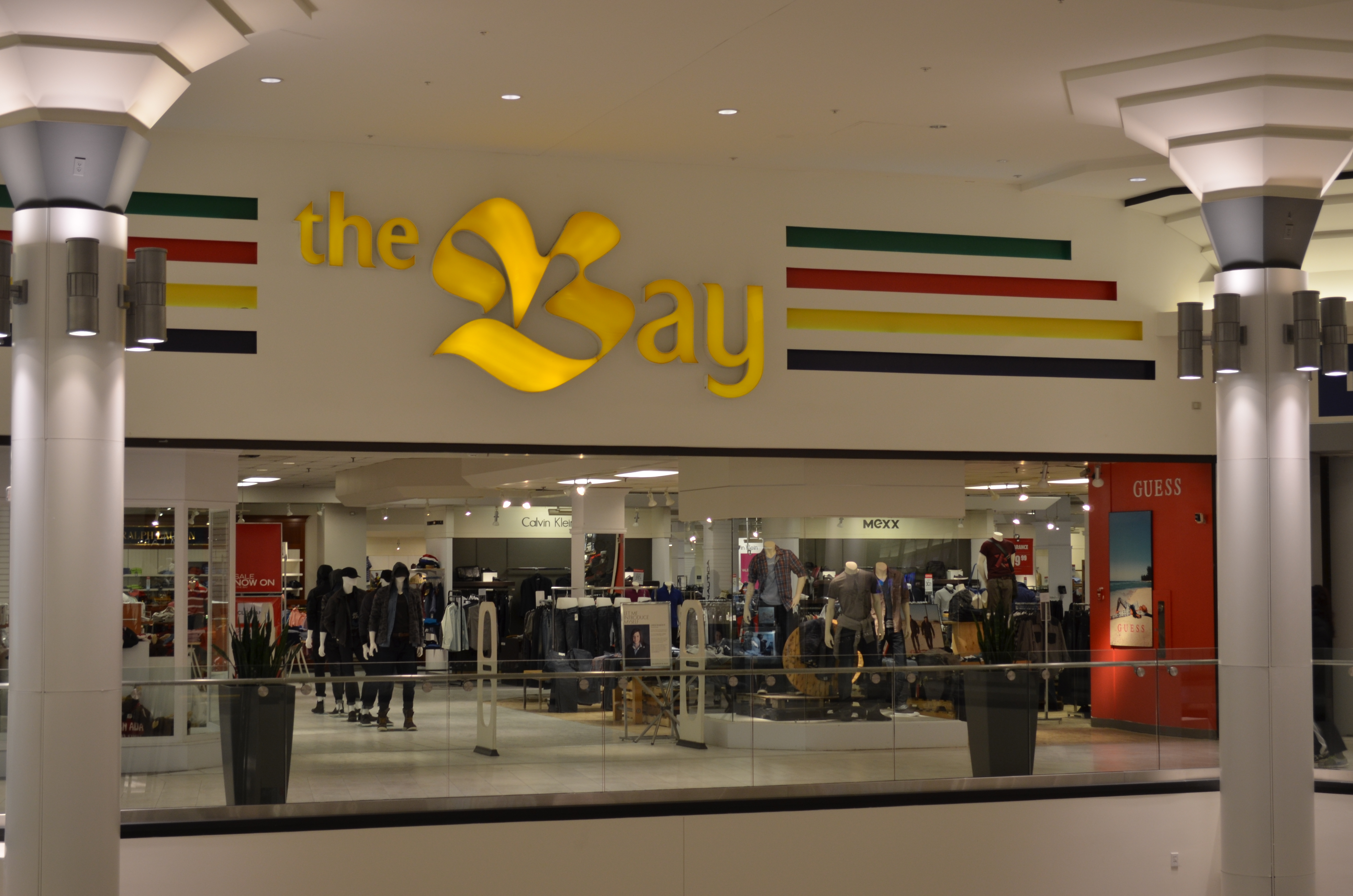
Hudson's Bay (when it was still branded as the Bay) in Markville Shopping Centre, in Markham, Ontario

=== Early history ===
The diversification of the Hudson's Bay Company (HBC) became necessary with the decline of fur trade in the latter half of the 19th century, and the Deed of Surrender in which ownership of the North-Western Territory and Rupert's Land was transferred from HBC to the newly established country of Canada in 1870. The first Hudson's Bay Company store opened in 1881 in Winnipeg, Manitoba, with an inventory consisting of dry goods, groceries, and hardware. HBC reorganized into fur trade, lands sales, and retail divisions in 1910. With the guidance of a director from the British department store Harrods, they began construction of full-line department stores in 1913. This "modernization program" resulted in the "original six" department stores in Calgary and Edmonton in Alberta; Vancouver and Victoria in British Columbia; Winnipeg in Manitoba; and Saskatoon in Saskatchewan.

Hudson's Bay Company made inroads to the provinces of Ontario and Quebec with its acquisition of the Montreal-based Morgan's department store chain in November 1960.

=== Following renaming to the Bay ===
Hudson's Bay Company adopted the name the Bay for its retail stores in 1965. The stores in Quebec continued with the Morgan's banner until they were renamed the Bay in 1972. That same year, Hudson's Bay purchased Ottawa's Freimans department store and moved from the former Morgan's building on Sparks Street to the Freiman building on Rideau Street, closer to competing Ogilvy's and Caplan's.

The Bay further expanded its presence in Eastern Canada by absorbing the Simpsons department store chain in 1991 and in Western Canada by taking over many former Woodward's outlets in 1993. The Toronto Queen Street flagship store was previously a Simpsons department store. In 1998, Hudson's Bay Company acquired the Canadian operations of Kmart and although the vast majority of the 112 locations either converted to Zellers or closed altogether, a few became The Bay stores. Former Kmart locations were turned into the Bay specialty outlets, with the exception of the location at Georgian Mall, which was converted to a regular Bay store. Following the acquisition of the former department store Simpson’s, Hudson’s Bay retained 30% of shares in Simpsons-Sears. This was later sold back to Sears Holdings.

In 1991, Hudson's Bay Company stopped selling fur. In 1997, the company reopened its fur salons, including a wider assortment of high-end designer furs. Fur salons included many exclusive fur designers, including Louis Féraud, Givenchy, Black Diamond Mink, and Grosvenor.

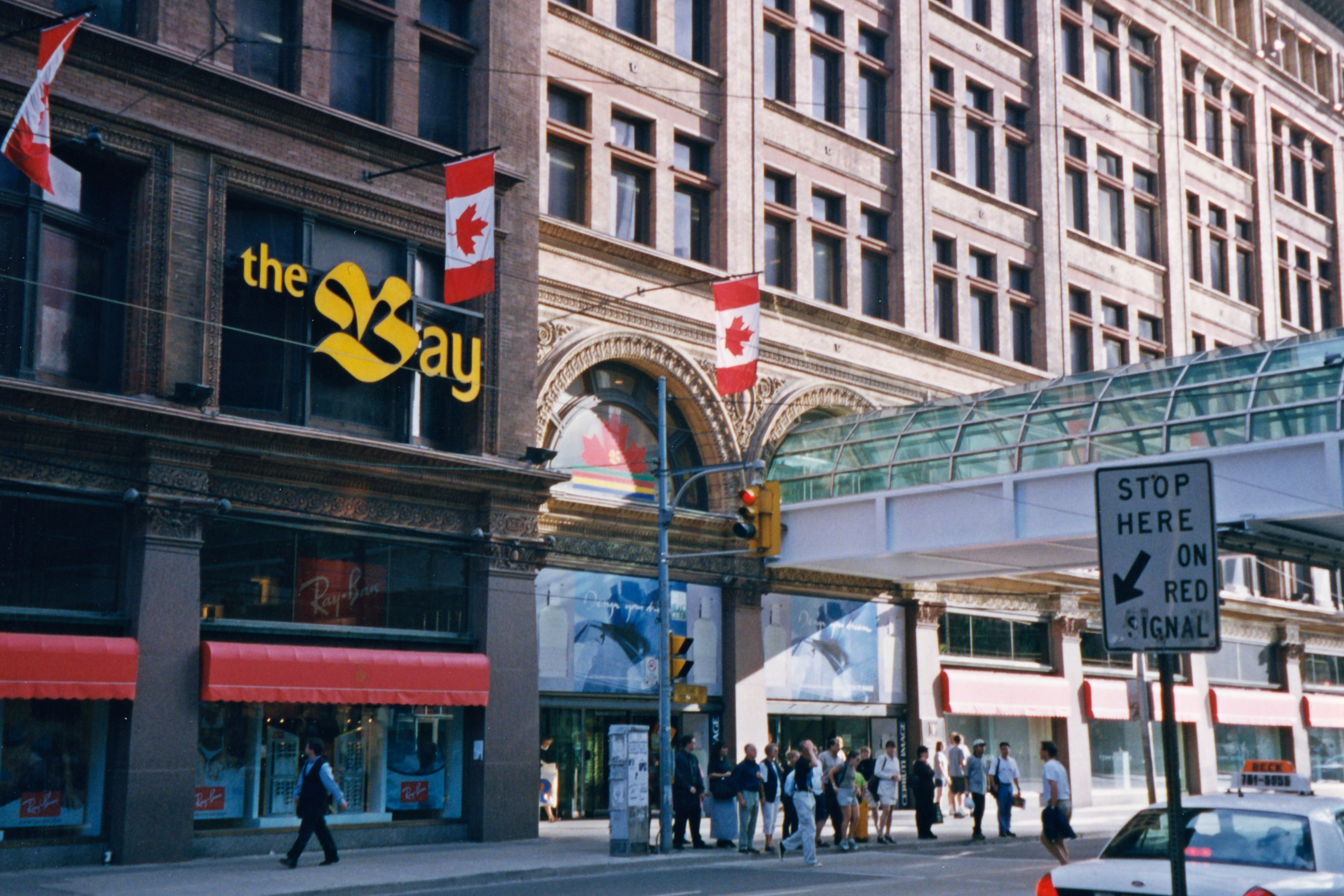
the Bay's flagship store in Toronto, 1999

On 16 July 2008, following the death of CEO Jerry Zucker, the company announced that it had been purchased by the US firm NRDC Equity Partners, which owned Saks Fifth Avenue.

In August 2008, NRDC hired Bonnie Brooks as president and chief executive officer of the Hudson's Bay Company. As the result of market research, Brooks began to focus on bolstering high-end fashion as a growth segment, which included a major revamp of the chain's selection of labels, and a renovation and relaunch of The Room—a luxury women's department at the Queen Street location. During the 2010 Winter Olympics in Vancouver, the company used a heritage-oriented campaign to promote the Bay and an accompanying line of Olympic-themed apparel, which was considered to be a significant success. In 2010, the Queen Street location saw a 22% increase in year-over-year sales. In 2011, the Bay launched White Space—a new younger-skewing "contemporary" department—at selected locations.

=== Following renaming to Hudson's Bay ===
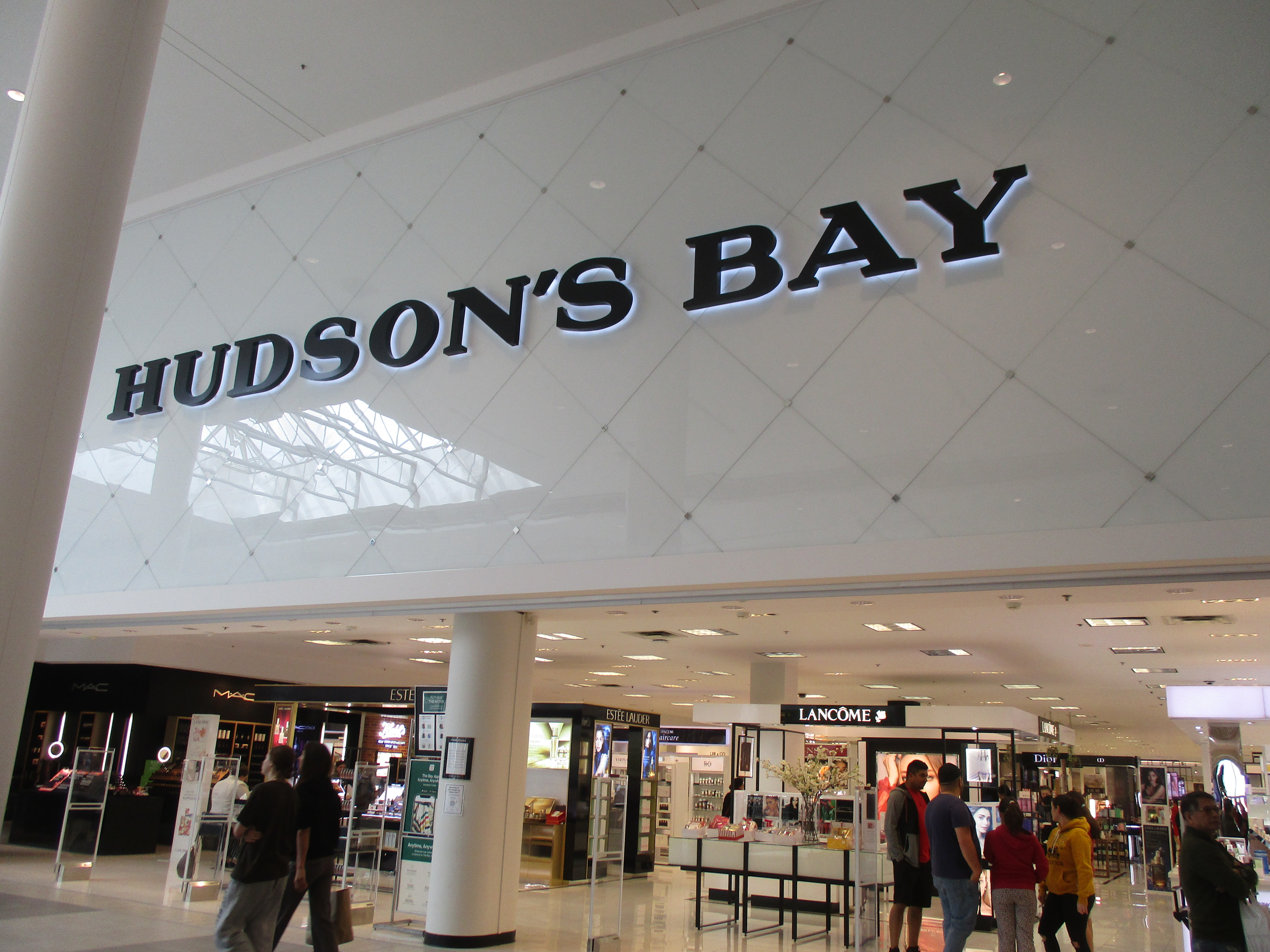
Hudson's Bay in Chinook Centre in Calgary, Alberta

Hudson's Bay Company announced alongside its initial public offering that the Bay stores would be renamed Hudson's Bay beginning in October 2012, replacing the stylized yellow "B" used since 1965 with the Hudson's Bay wordmark and coat of arms. The new Hudson's Bay rebranding campaign was officially launched on 6 March 2013.

On 31 August 2019, the company announced that all 15 of its Dutch locations would be sold by year end, the final chapter of HBC's European venture.

On 4 March 2020, American financier, Richard A. Baker, who had already been governor and executive board chairman of HBC since NRDC seized control, took over as CEO. Commentators noted that this was part of Baker's "consolidation of power" in an effort to sell off property it owned to benefit investors in the short-term. Doug Stephens noted that Baker's ambitions were about "about liquidating real estate holdings and converting any remaining assets to cash".

Hudson's Bay stores were temporarily closed beginning on 17 March 2020 in response to the COVID-19 pandemic in Canada. The stores began gradually reopening on 19 May.

In August 2021, HBC split the online business of Hudson's Bay into its own separate division. The online store was branded as the Bay, while the physical stores retained the Hudson's Bay name. In 2022, the two businesses were reunited in the same division.

In 2023, Hudson's Bay opened Zellers sections of up to 10,000 square feet (930 m^{2}) each in 78 of its locations, using the store-within-a-store format.

=== Liquidation and closure of stores ===
On 7 March 2025, the Hudson's Bay Company filed for creditor protection under the Companies' Creditors Arrangement Act. The company stated it failed to secure financing, as well as constant delays in paying suppliers. Saks Global, parent of the Saks Fifth Avenue stores in the United States and the Neiman Marcus retail chain, was not part of the filing for creditor protection and continues to remain operational.

On 14 March 2025, HBC announced that it intended to liquidate and shutter all 80 Hudson's Bay stores if no financing could be secured, as well as all 3 Saks Fifth Avenue and 13 Saks Off 5th locations in Canada, for a combined total of 96 locations to be shuttered. On 21 March 2025, an Ontario court approved the liquidation of 74 Hudson’s Bay, 2 Saks Fifth Avenue, and all 13 Saks Off 5th locations. Liquidation sales for those stores began on 24 March 2025.

Between 8 and 14 March, HBC recorded almost $21 million in sales, about $7.4 million more than expected. This allowed HBC to repay its $16-million debtor-in-possession loan. HBC had $950 million of debt that it owed to landlords, suppliers, banks, and governments. In total, it has almost 1900 creditors.

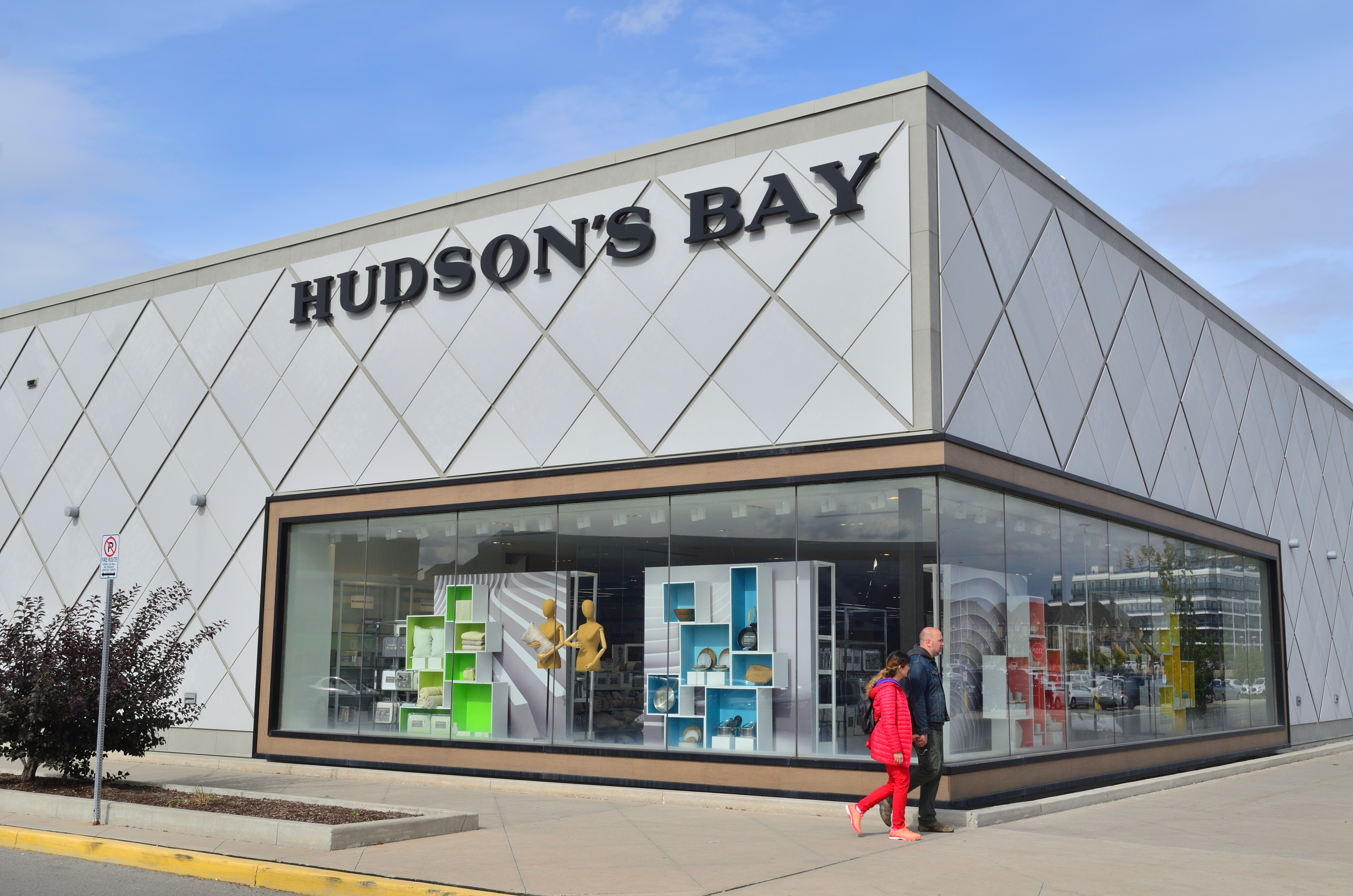
Hudson's Bay in Hillcrest Mall in Richmond Hill, Ontario

Six Hudson's Bay locations with higher sales were initially spared from the liquidation. This included the flagship stores in Toronto and Montreal, and the locations at Yorkdale, Hillcrest Mall, Carrefour Laval and Fairview Pointe-Claire. However, due to court rulings deeming it "low probability" to find a buyer to keep the remaining six stores afloat, HBC announced liquidation of all Hudson's Bay stores in April 2025, with final closures no later than 15 June. All Hudson's Bay stores permanently closed and ceased retail operation on 1 June 2025. Over 8,000 employees were laid off, which was nearly 90 percent of the retailer's workforce. Hudson's Bay kept a small percentage of its employees, nearly 1,000, in order to conclude fixture sales at its stores, who were also terminated when its distribution centres closed two weeks later. As of 16 June 2025, approximately 118 employees remain in order to wind down and dissolve the Hudson's Bay Company.

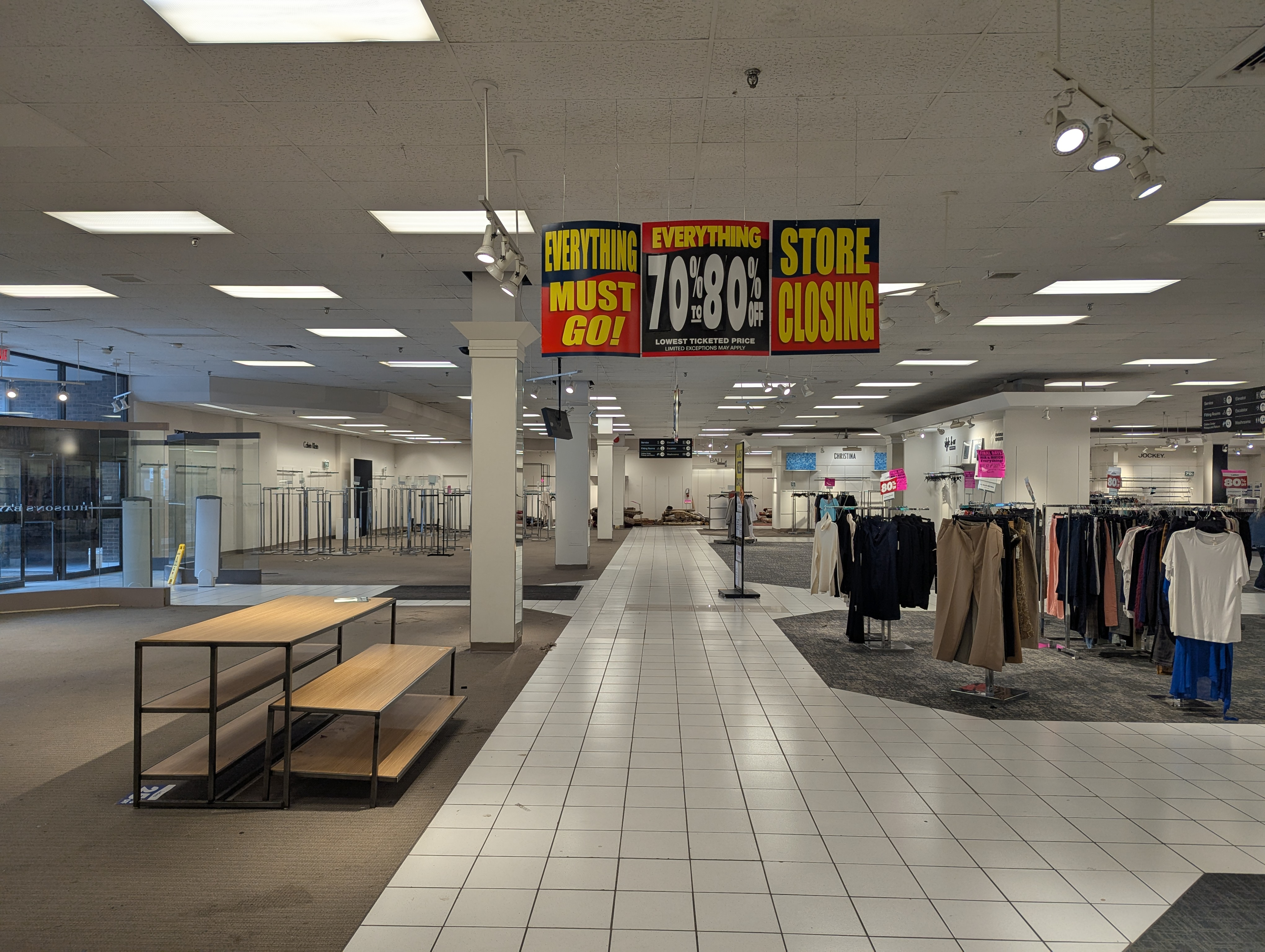
Store closing sale in May, 2025

In May 2025, Canadian Tire acquired the Hudson's Bay's intellectual property pending court approval. Canadian Tire will pay $30 million for the deal, which includes the overall Hudson’s Bay brand, its stripes line, its coat of arms, and brands including Gluckstein, Distinctly Home, and Hudson North. HBC received 17 bids before closing a deal with Canadian Tire. At that time, there were also 12 bids for 39 of the Hudson's Bay store leases, of which Canadian Tire was one of the bidders.

Later in May 2025, businesswoman Ruby Liu placed bids for 28 store leases, pending court or landlord approval. The stores were located in British Columbia, Alberta and Ontario. Liu planned to launch a new department store chain with the acquired leases. Liu's company Central Walk already owned three shopping centres in British Columbia: Tsawwassen Mills Mall, Mayfair Shopping Centre and Woodgrove Centre. On 23 June, the court approved Liu's acquisition of the 3 leases where Liu's company was the landlord. On 24 October, the court sided with landlords for 23 disputed store leases and rejected Liu's bid to acquire them. The judge cited her lack of experience at the leadership level representing a significant risk to the operational viability of launching and managing 25 large department stores in the contemplated timeline.

Ivanhoe Realties Inc. reached a deal to acquire one store lease at Metropolis at Metrotown, a shopping mall in Metrotown, Burnaby that its parent company, Ivanhoe Cambridge, already owned. The purchase price of the lease was $20,000.

In October 2025, Canadian Tire announced they will be marketing Hudson's Bay Point Blankets at their stores.

== Flagship stores ==
Hudson's Bay operated five flagship stores in four provinces. These flagship stores were in multi-storey historic buildings in the downtowns of Canada's largest cities. The largest, the Toronto store building on the southwest corner of Yonge Street and Queen Street West, was converted from Simpsons in 1991. Considered the flagship of the chain, it occupied 70,000 square metres (750,000 sq ft), while a fifth of previously occupied space was converted to the Canadian Saks Fifth Avenue flagship store in 2015. Hudson's Bay Company sold the building to Cadillac Fairview, which owns the adjacent Toronto Eaton Centre, in 2014 and entered into a leaseback agreement through at least 2039. Conversely, the Ottawa store on Rideau Street occupied 31,100 square metres (335,000 sq ft) and was the smallest flagship that remained in a landmark building; it was converted from Freimans in 1973.

Hudson's Bay previously operated a store in the Hudson's Bay Centre, at the intersection of Yonge Street and Bloor Street at the east end of the Mink Mile in Toronto, opened in 1974 and succeeded the Winnipeg location to become the flagship store of the chain (despite being actually smaller in size than the former), until being replaced as the chain's flagship by the Queen Street West store in 1991. The Hudson's Bay Centre store shuttered on 13 May 2022, with the site expected to be redeveloped in conjunction with a major overhaul of the Bloor-Yonge TTC station.

Two flagship stores in the Canadian Prairies were announced to be phased out in the aftermath of the COVID-19 pandemic in Canada. The 1926-built downtown Winnipeg store on Portage Avenue was the flagship of the chain between 1926 and 1974. The Winnipeg building was valued at $0 by Cushman & Wakefield in 2019, due to the expense of renovating the heritage-protected building for other uses, as well as the competition from newer commercial real estate properties in the suburbs like Polo Park. The downtown Edmonton store on Jasper Avenue was built in 1939 on land that had been occupied by Hudson's Bay Company since 1893. It closed in 1995, two years after another the Bay store opened as an anchor tenant of the Edmonton City Centre. The latter eventually relocated to the former Eaton's store of the same shopping mall in 2002. Consequently, at 15,600 square metres (168,000 sq ft), it was the smallest Hudson's Bay flagship. The Winnipeg store closed on 30 November 2020, and the Edmonton store on 3 June 2021.

Due to changing shopping habits towards online purchasing as a result of the COVID-19 pandemic, the parent of Hudson's Bay considered downsizing some stores and redeveloping the surplus space for mixed-use. HBC stated that it was exploring the option of a leaseback agreement for the 1927-built Vancouver store in 2017 which never materialized.

While in March 2025, HBC announced that 90 of its stores would close and 6 flagship stores would remain open (3 in the Toronto area and 3 in the Montreal area, including the Hudson's Bay flagship store in downtown Toronto and its downtown Montreal flagship in the Bay Building, HBC announced in April the permanent closure of all of its stores, including all of its flagship locations, effective 1 June 2025.

List of Hudson's Bay flagship stores
Province	City	Size	Year opened	Year closed	Notes
Alberta	Calgary	42,000 m^{2} (450,000 sq ft)	1913	2025	Liquidated due to creditor protection filed by HBC in March 2025
Alberta	Edmonton	43,000 m^{2} (460,000 sq ft)	1939	1995	Now owned by the University of Alberta, converted into Enterprise Square
Alberta	Edmonton		1993	2002	Converted from Woodward's store
Alberta	Edmonton	15,600 m^{2} (168,000 sq ft)	2002	2021	Relocated to former Eaton's store
British Columbia	Vancouver	59,200 m^{2} (637,000 sq ft)	1927	2025	Bay Building; liquidated due to creditor protection filed by HBC in March 2025
Manitoba	Winnipeg	60,900 m^{2} (656,000 sq ft)	1926	2020	Originally scheduled to close in February 2021, however, closed in November 2020 due to impact of COVID-19
Ontario	Ottawa	31,100 m^{2} (335,000 sq ft)	1973	2025	Converted from Freimans; liquidated due to creditor protection filed by HBC in March 2025
Ontario	Toronto	79,000 m^{2} (850,000 sq ft)	1991	2025	Flagship store; converted from Simpsons, and liquidated due to creditor protection filed by HBC in March 2025
Ontario	Toronto	31,800 m^{2} (342,000 sq ft)	1974	2022	Hudson's Bay Centre; flagship store until 1991
Quebec	Montreal	60,900 m^{2} (655,000 sq ft)	1972	2025	Bay Building; converted from Morgan's, and liquidated due to creditor protection filed by HBC in March 2025

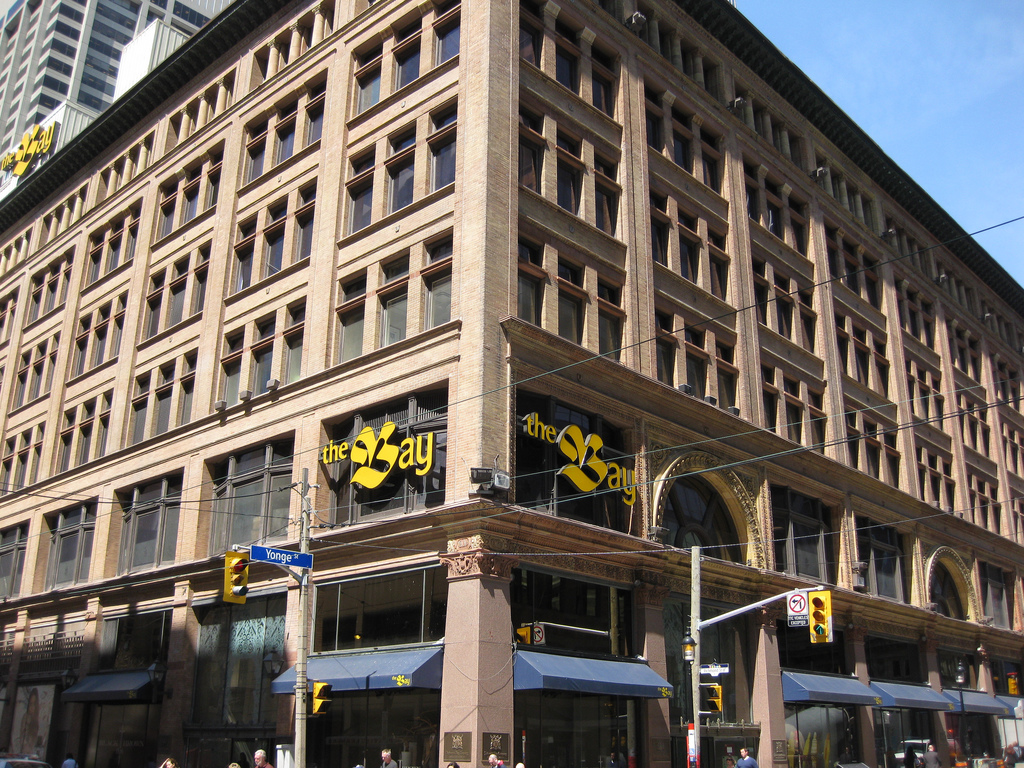
Flagship store in downtown Toronto (2009)

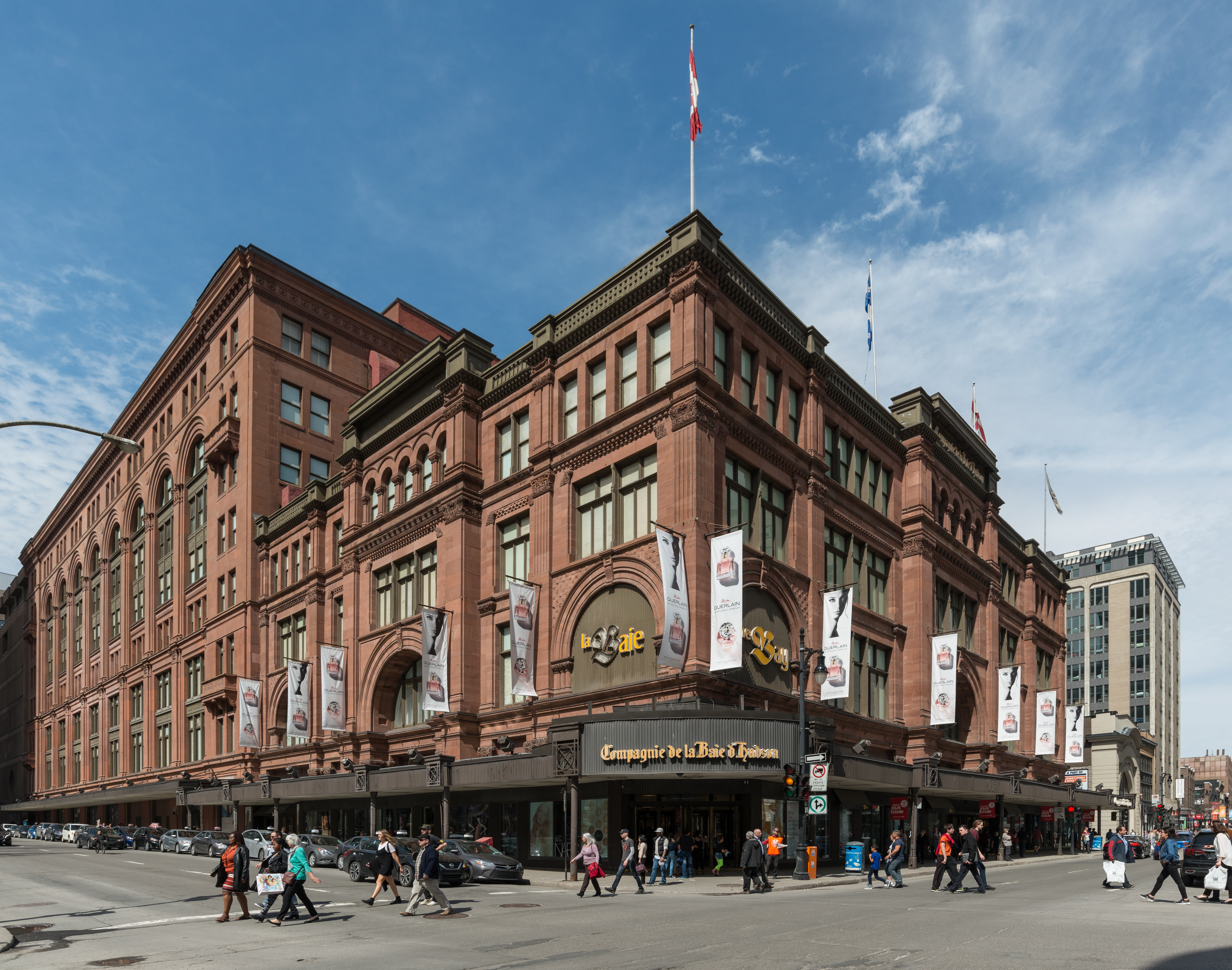
Downtown Montreal store (2017)

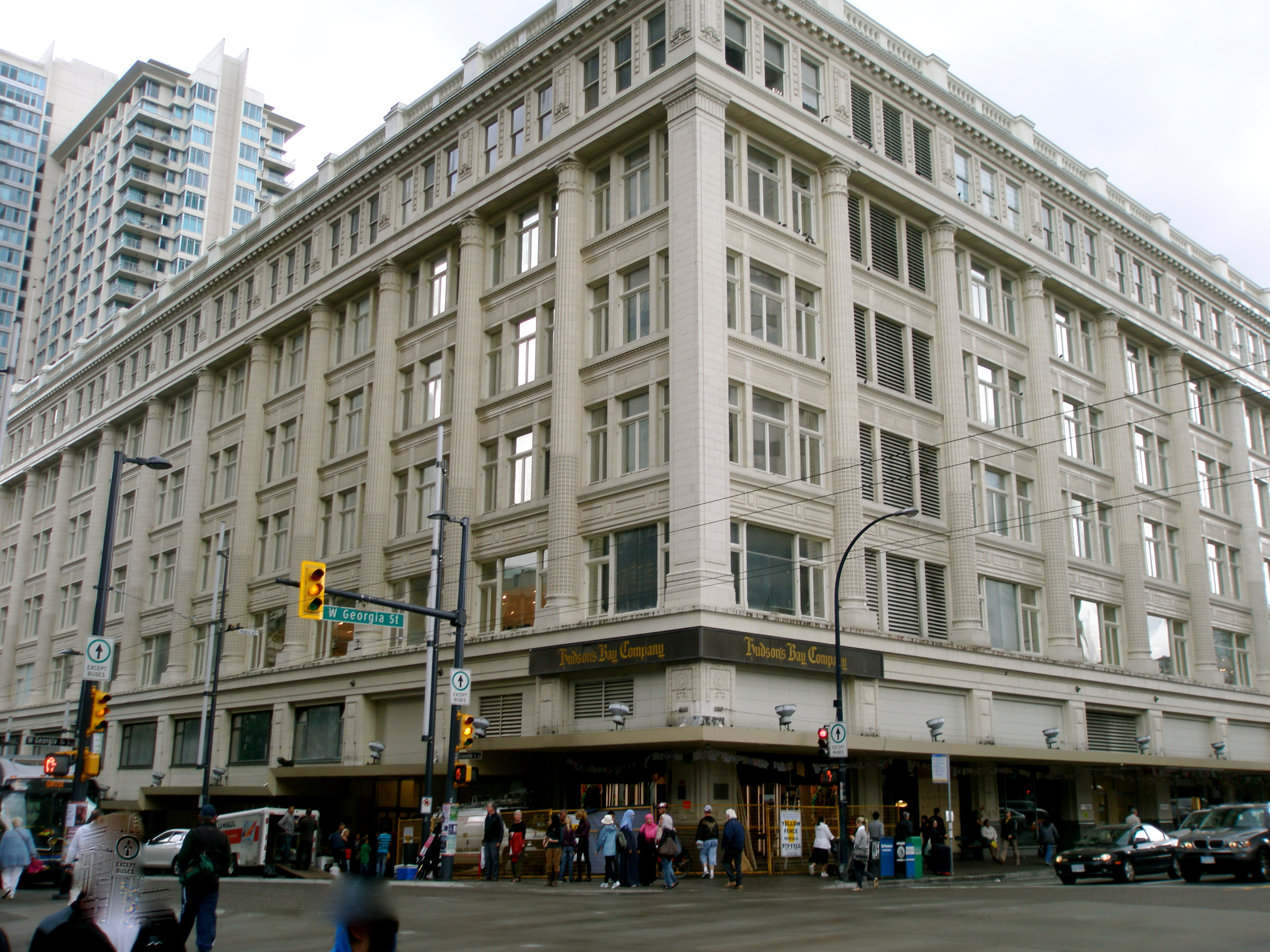
Downtown Vancouver store (2010)

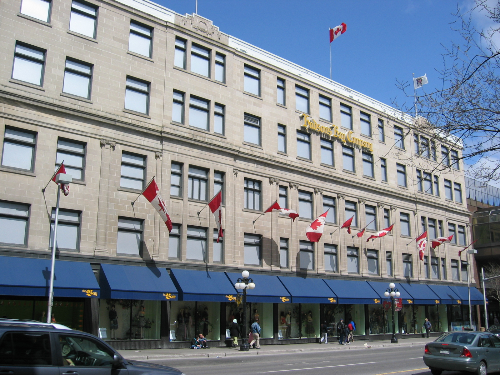
Downtown Ottawa store (2006)

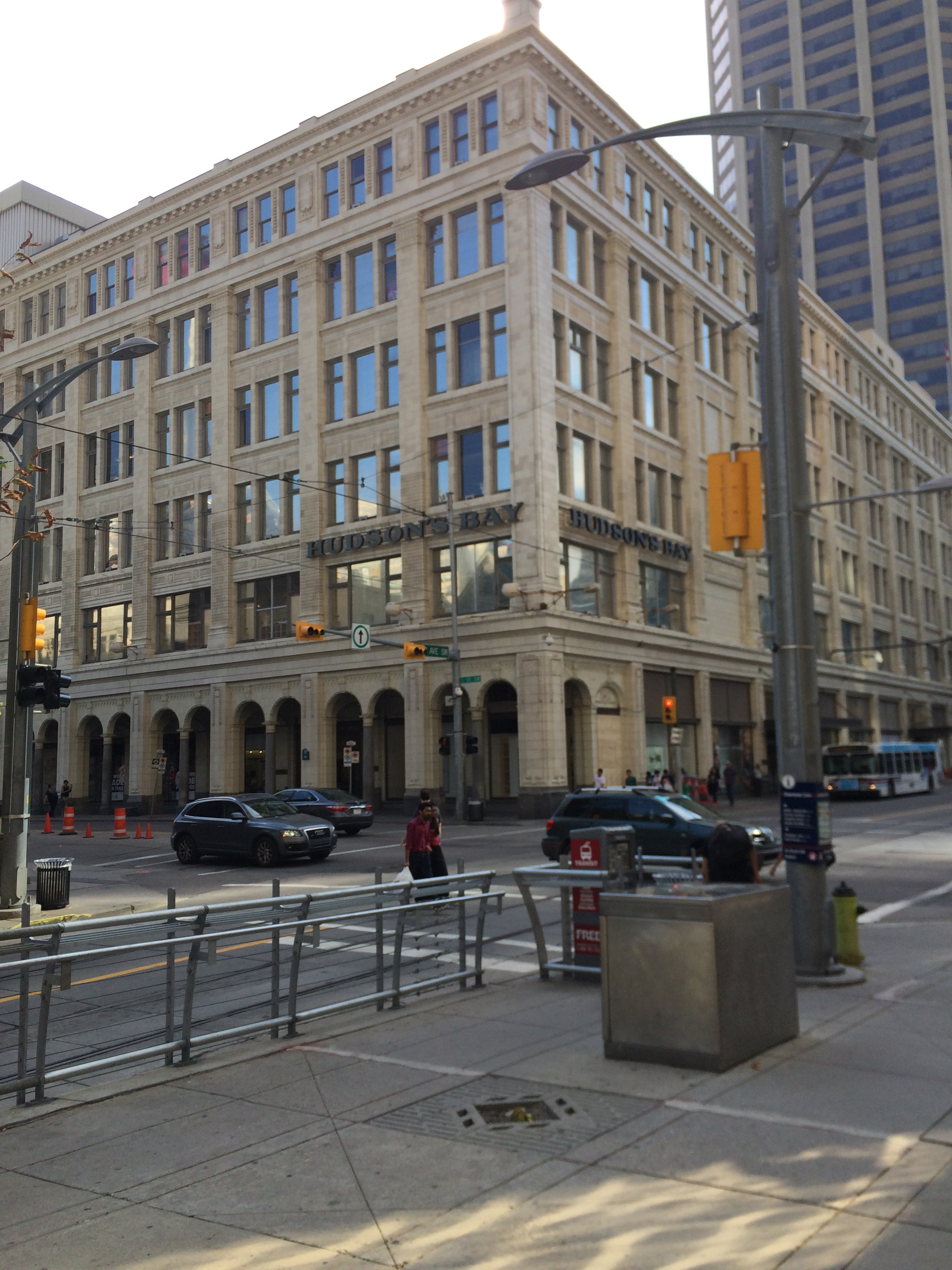
Downtown Calgary store

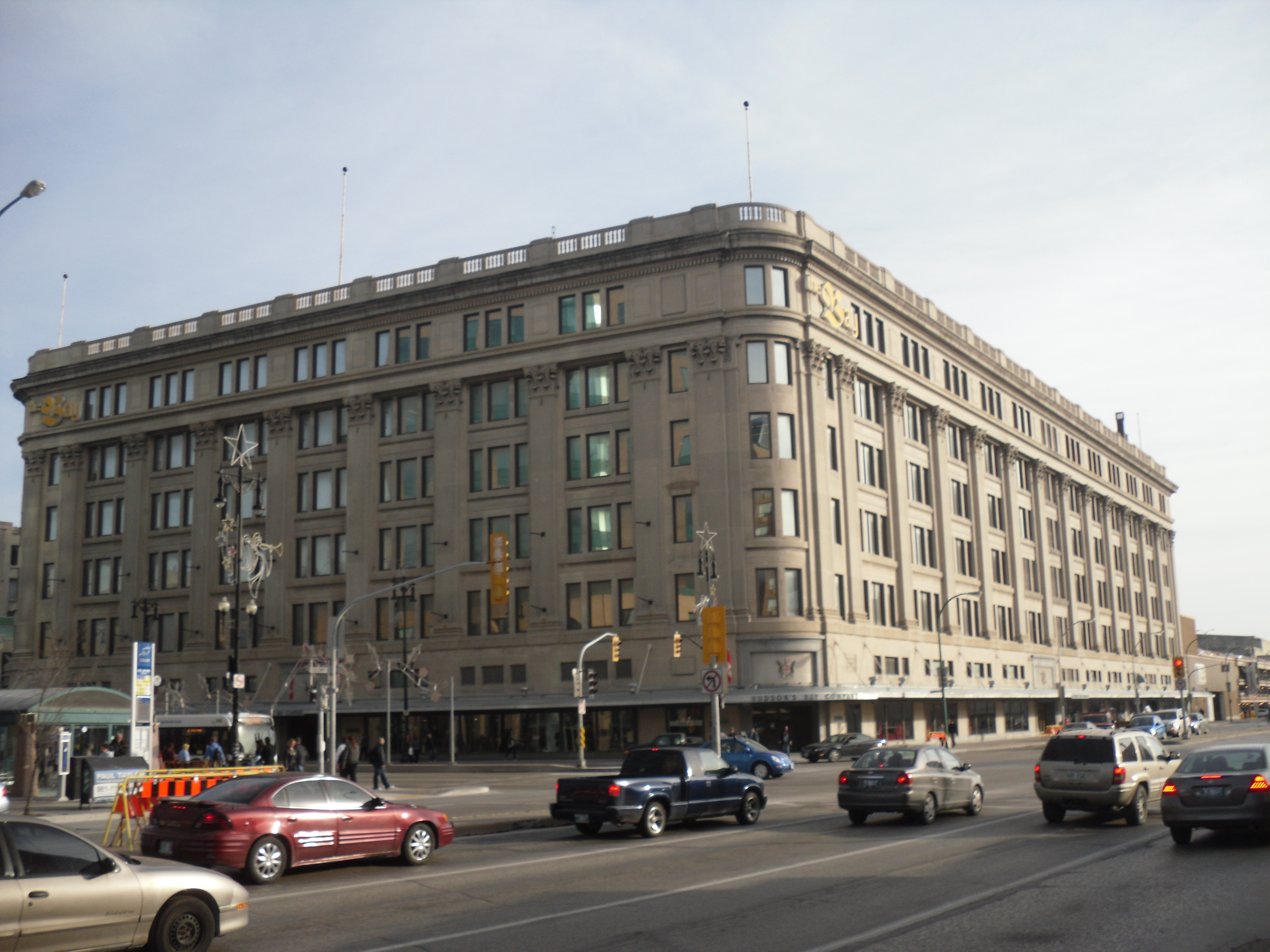
Winnipeg flagship store

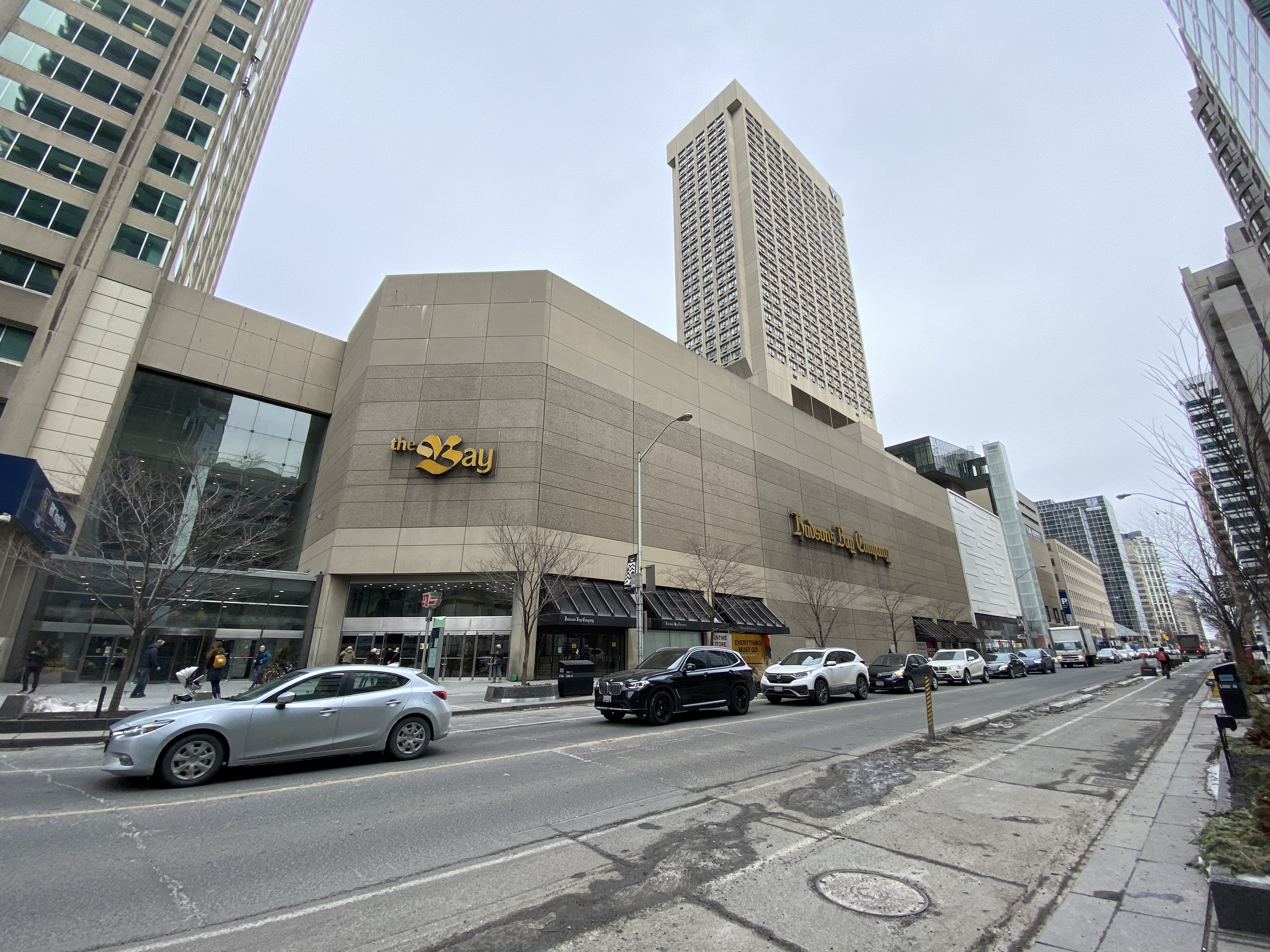
Hudson's Bay Centre flagship store in Yorkville, Toronto

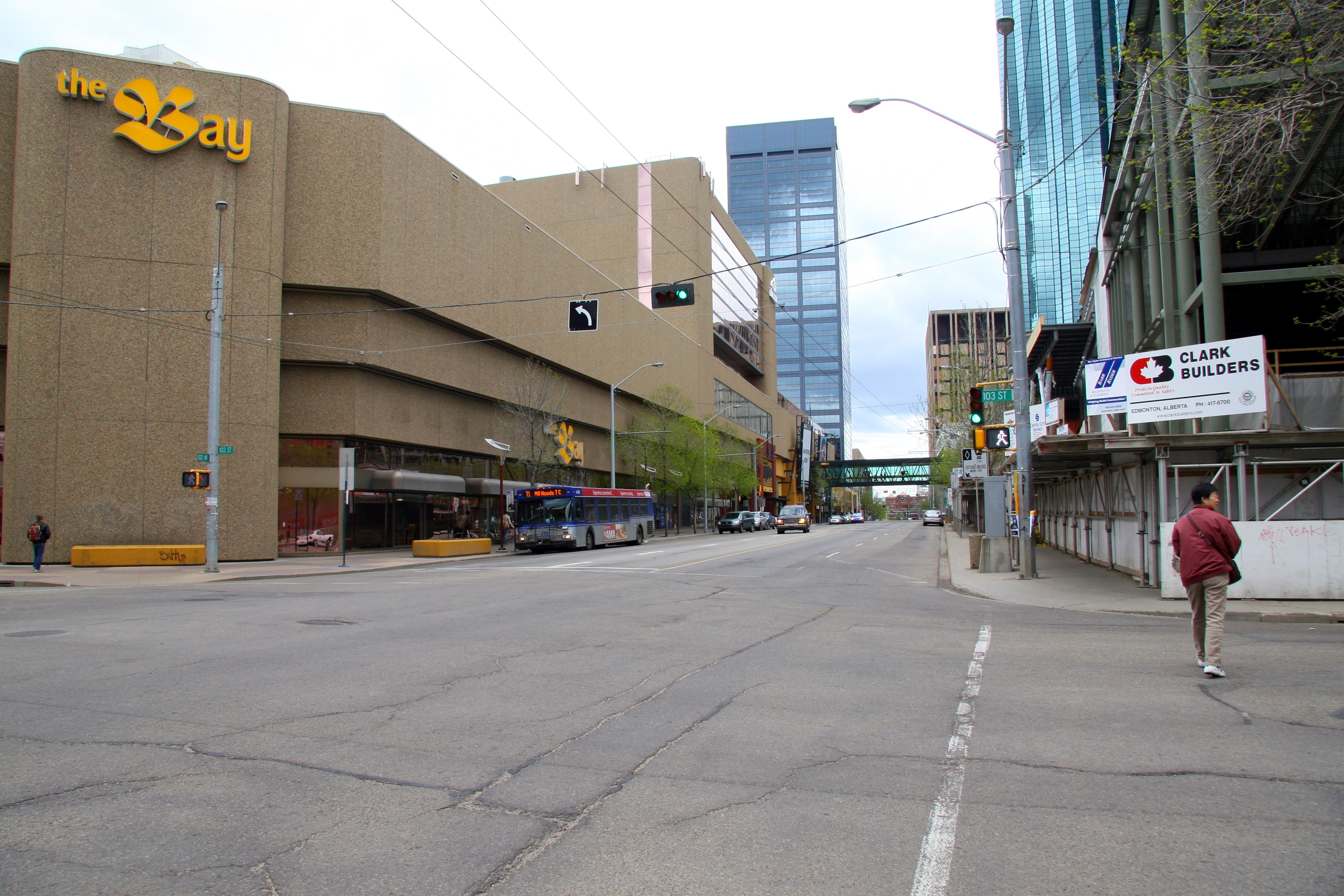
Edmonton City Centre flagship store

== Store format ==
=== The Room and West End Shop ===
The Room was a luxury boutique found in selected Hudson's Bay locations, which featured a curated selection of women's apparel from upscale brands such as Balmain, Emmanuel Ungaro, Halston, Gianfranco Ferre, Giorgio Armani, Moschino, and others. Nicholas Mellamphy is the vice-president and buying director of The Room. Its namesake at the Yonge & Queen location in Toronto was established in the 1930s as the St. Regis Room, dating back to its time as a Simpsons store. It underwent a major renovation in 2009 by the design firm Yabu Pushelberg, with an increase to 2,000 square metres (21,500 sq ft) in floor space, and expanding its stock from around 12 brands to 70 (including more "moderately-priced" options). The $5.3 million renovation was positioned by Brooks as part of a plan to increase the Bay's focus on high-end fashion; there were also plans to expand The Room as a featured department at other flagship locations.

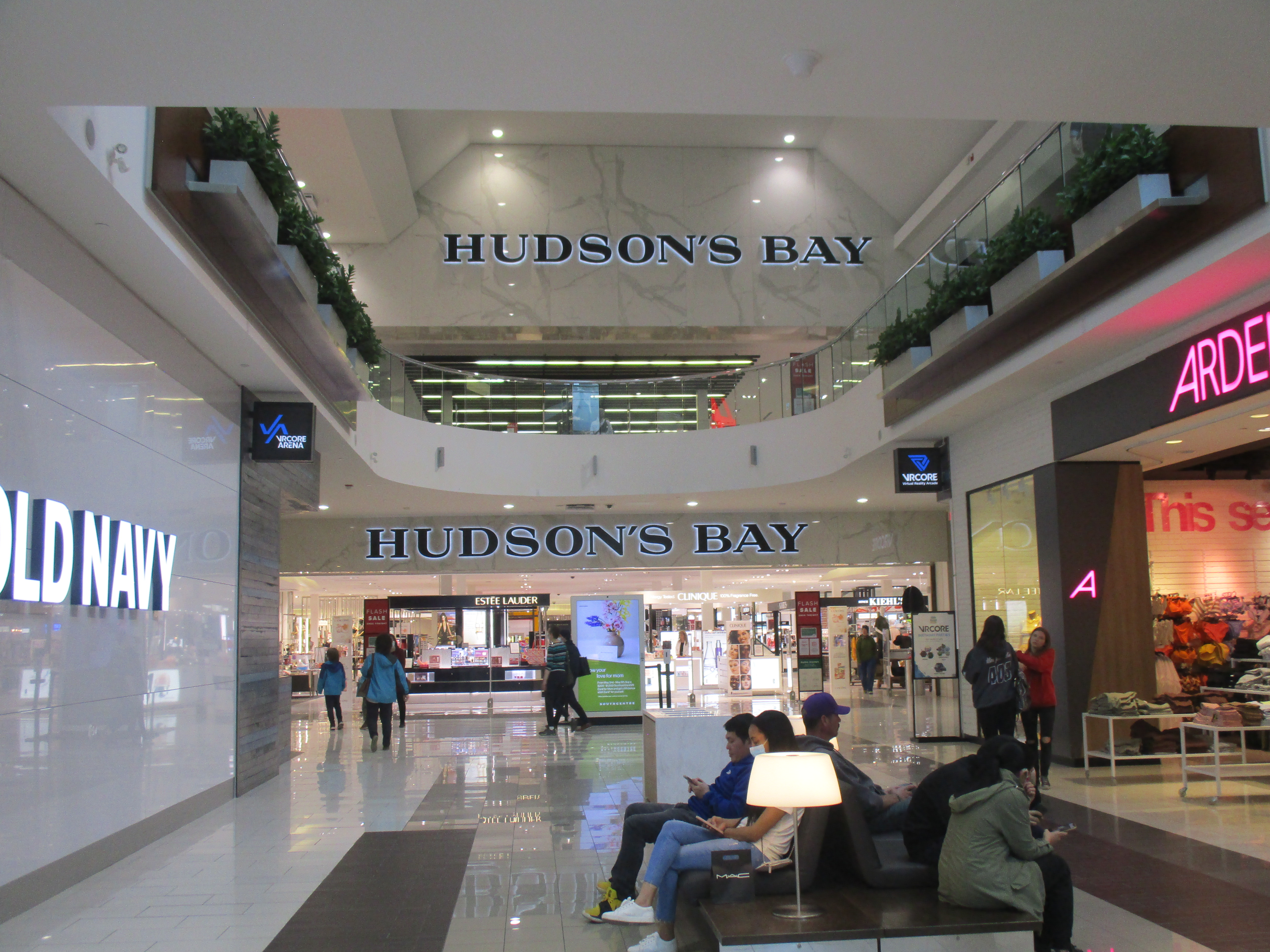
Hudson's Bay in Southcentre Mall in Calgary, Alberta

The Room opened at the downtown Vancouver location in 2011, in the north-east section of the second floor. The 2,100 square metres (23,000 sq ft) department included many of the designers available in the Toronto Queen Street flagship store, and some not available in the flagship store, including DSquared^{2}, Jeremy Liang, and Sid Neigum. The Room opened in the downtown Montreal Hudson's Bay store in late 2013. The Toronto version of The Room was relocated to a different part of the store in 2015 to accommodate a new Saks Fifth Avenue location.

The West End Shop was the men's version of The Room. The Toronto Queen Street and the Vancouver Granville West End Shops underwent an extensive renovation in 2019. The collection contained labels such as Hugo Boss, Ermenegildo Zegna, Armani Collezioni, Ben Sherman, and Strellson.

=== Hudson's Bay Company Signature Shop ===
The Bay offered products from the Hudson's Bay Company Collection in a dedicated store, including items such as the iconic Point Blankets, coats, bed sheets, bags, T-shirts, lotions, scents, and candles. HBC has also partnered with Canadian companies like Virginia Johnson, Pink Tartan, and Klaxon Howl to create exclusive, limited edition merchandise. Customized canoes and oars are also available. HBC has also teamed with international companies for limited edition products, such as Steiff (heritage teddy bear, limited run of 2 500), and Best Made Axe Co. While the Hudson's Bay Company shops appeared mainly in flagship stores and its Banff, Alberta location, products from the Hudson's Bay Company Collection (not including limited edition items) were also available at other locations, most notably the Point Blanket. The four-point stripes have also been trademarked worldwide, and are sold through international retailers which included Lord & Taylor in the US, and Colette in France, in an attempt to market HBC as a brand.

=== Designer label boutiques ===
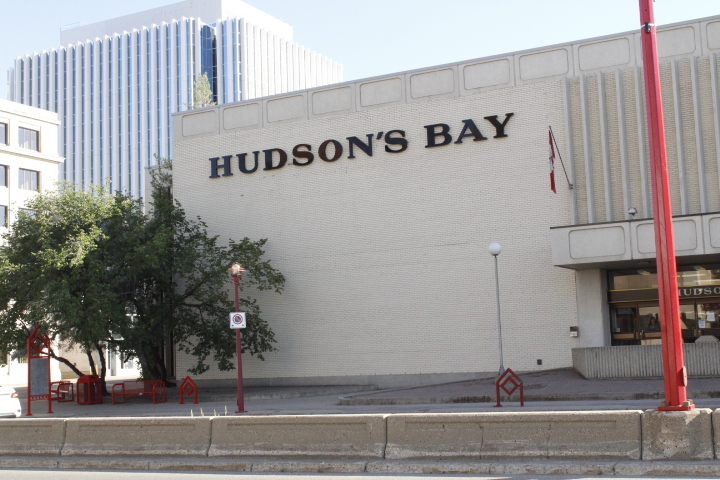
Hudson's Bay in Midtown in Downtown Saskatoon

Boutiques for Ralph Lauren were in select locations, including Queen Street, Yorkdale, Bayshore Ottawa, Carrefour Laval, Galeries d'Anjou, Vancouver Downtown, Victoria Downtown, Laurier Québec, and Montreal Downtown. Each boutique contained customized decor, and dedicated company specialists.

The Toronto Queen Street and Montreal Downtown store opened ground floor boutiques for Burberry, Coach Leathergoods, and See by Chloé. Vancouver and Montreal ground-floor designer boutiques followed. Hudson's Bay has ended its partnership with Saint-Laurent-based Browns Shoes, and closed all Browns locations in its stores, to allow the department store to offer a larger selection of shoes, and to partner with the Montreal-based ALDO Group. Hudson's Bay is now also offering higher-end brands, keeping in line with offerings from The Room and the West End Shop. The partnership with the Aldo Group began in spring 2011 when the revived Pegabo brand of footwear is going to be carried in Hudson's Bay and in Aldo's own FeetFirst and Locale locations. The website includeed online shopping for home fashions and beauty products, and a gift registry.

== Brand identity ==
=== Logo ===
The Hudson's Bay Company wordmark was written in Blackletter script before 1965.

Lippincott & Margulies designed the "folk-friendly" 1965 Bay logo, which features a stylized yellow "B" that was previously seen on the header of Hudson's Bay Company's royal charter from 1670. Morgan's stores in Quebec featured a logo with an "M" stylized similarly to the "B" from 1969 until they were rebranded as the Bay in 1972.

Lipman designed the 2013 Hudson's Bay rebranding campaign; it restored the Hudson's Bay Company's heraldic achievement, redrawn by Mark Summers. The wordmark is used on all public-facing materials, and has been compared to the typeface used by British fashion house Burberry. The coat of arms is reserved for limited occasions. Before the official rebranding launch, the logo appeared on the exterior of the Vancouver flagship store in December 2012.

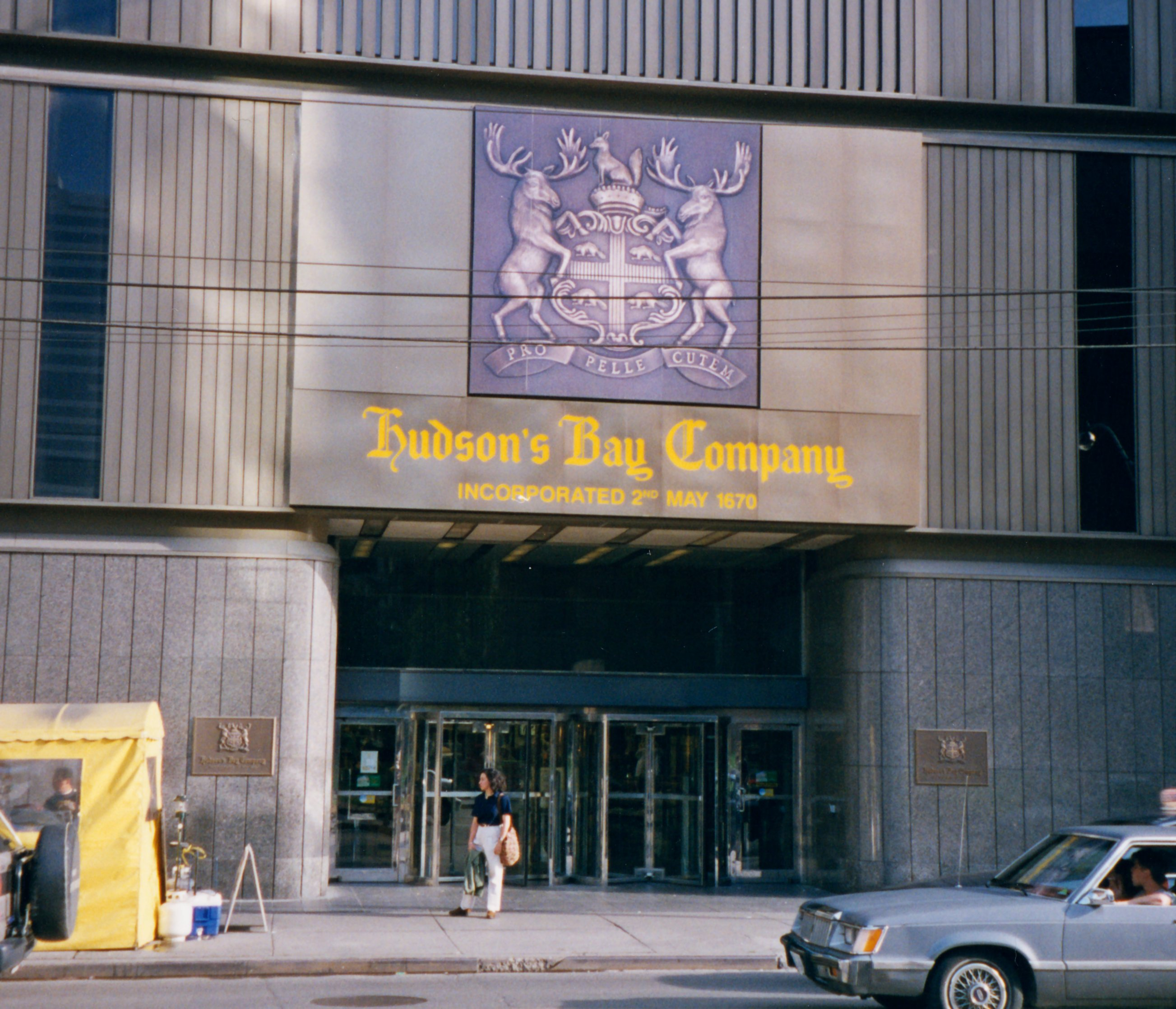
Logo prior to 1965

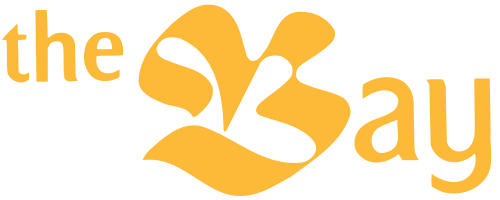
The Bay logo, used from 1965–2013.

Hudson's Bay logo with coat of arms, used from 2013-2025.

=== Blankets and related "bay stripe" products ===
Hudson's Bay point blankets are woollen blankets originally made for the Hudson's Bay Company (HBC) in British North America, now Canada and the United States. Manufactured in England since 1779, historically they served as a form of currency during the North American fur trade exchanged with First Nations for beaver pelts. Sold by HBC trading posts, they were often hand made into winter clothing (specifically capotes and mackinaws) worn extensively by voyageurs (European fur traders) and Indigenous peoples. Beginning in the 20th century, an HBC factory-made "point blanket coat" was popularized amongst the population of Canada to the extent that it was looked on as a national dress. HBC point blankets have become part of the Canadian identity representing a nationally shared cultural symbol.

The colour schemes of the blankets, including the multi-stripe version, historically known as "Queen Anne colours", have expanded into fashion, and lifestyle products. These "Bay 'stripe' branded products" were exclusively sold by Hudson's Bay department stores (the Bay) and affiliates until HBC intellectual property rights were purchased by Canadian Tire in 2025 during the liquidation of HBC assets.

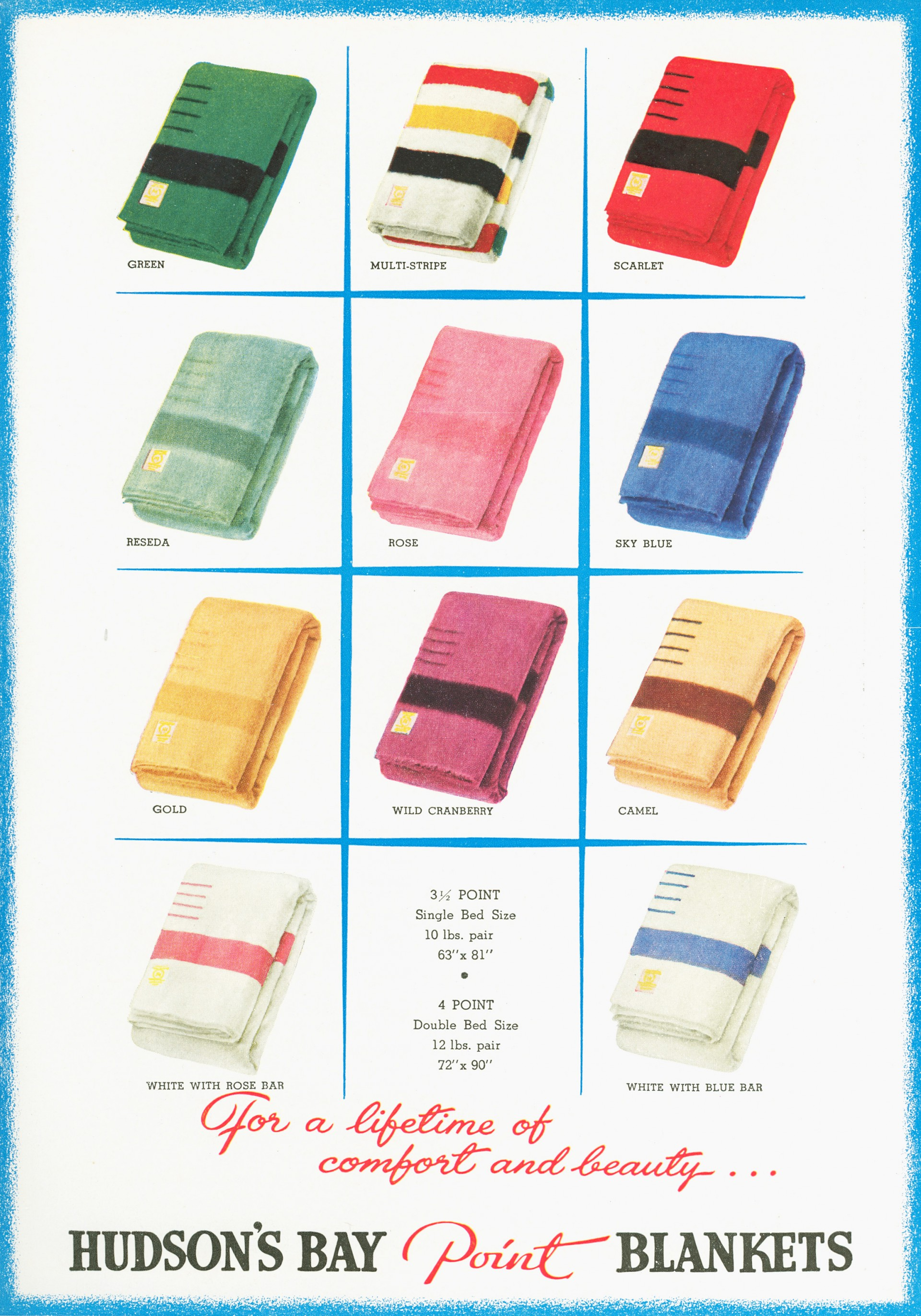
1952 Hudsons Bay Blanket advertisement

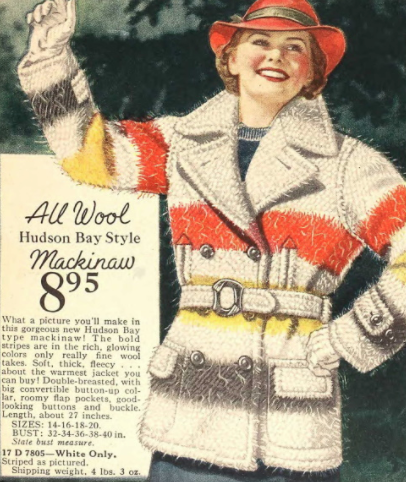
1936 HBC Catalogue

== See also ==
- List of Canadian department stores
