= Timeline of Rupert's Land and North-Western Territory transfer =

- Date: July 15, 1870
- Type: Land transfer by annexation
- Motive: Canadian territorial acquisition
- Organised by: Government of Canada, Government of the United Kingdom, Hudson's Bay Company

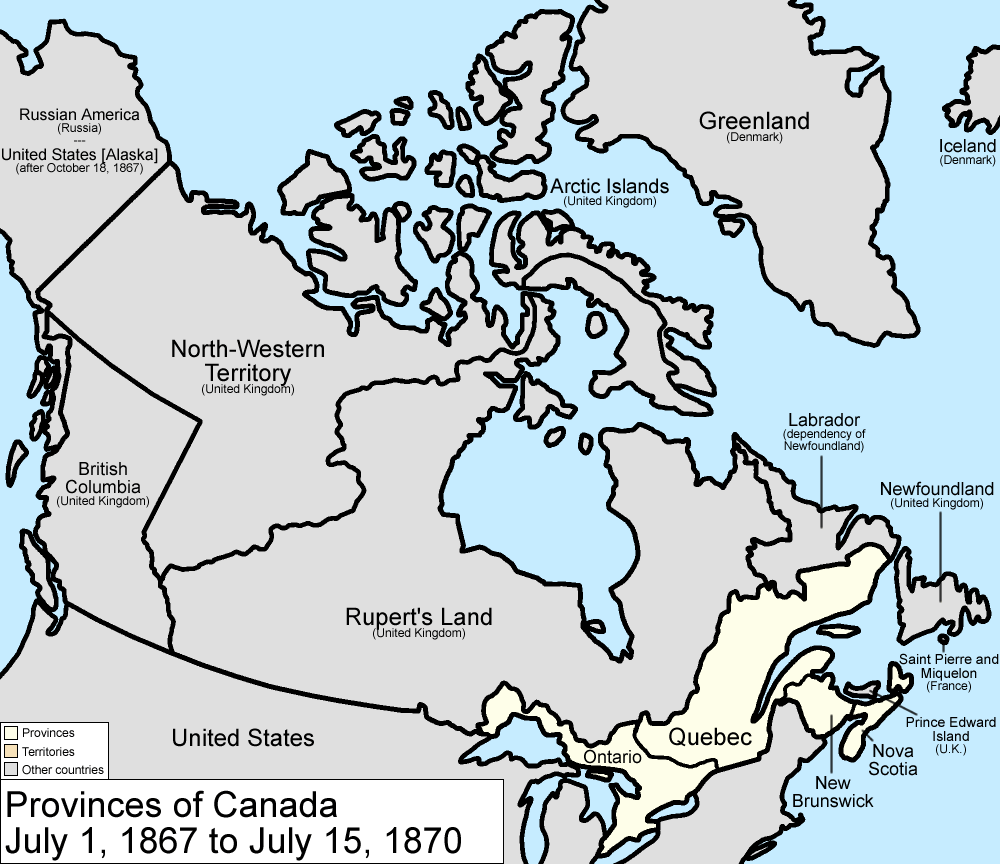
Canada, prior to receiving Rupert's Land and North-Western Territory

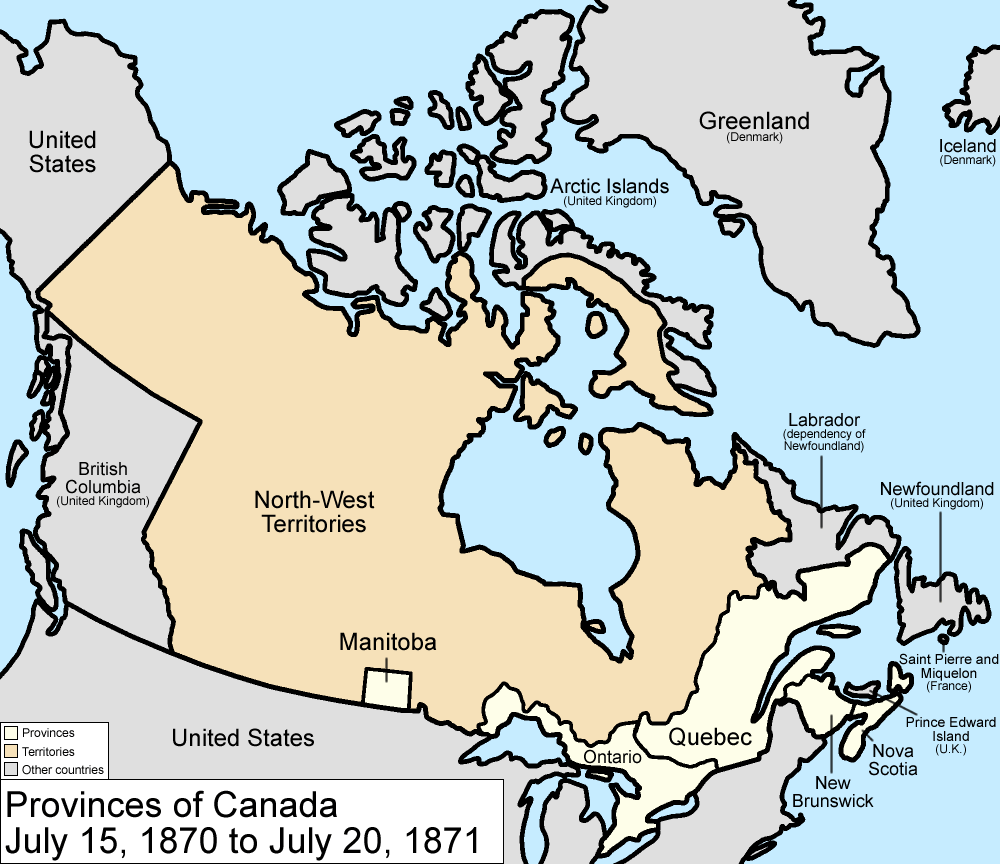
Canada after receiving Rupert's Land and North-Western Territory. Manitoba is also created as a province, simultaneously.

This article outlines the mechanisms and timeline of the transfer of Rupert's Land and North-Western Territory from the Hudson's Bay Company (HBC) back to the Crown and then immediately to the newly federated Canada.

Year	Date	Event	Reference
1670	May 2	King Charles II of England grants HBC a royal charter for "the sole Trade and Commerce of all those Seas, Streights, Bays, Rivers, Lakes, Creeks, and Sounds, in whatsoever Latitude they shall be, that lie within the entrance of the Streights commonly called Hudson's Streights... which are not now actually possessed by any of our Subjects, or by the Subjects of any other Christian Prince or State... and that the said Land be from henceforth... called Rupert's Land".	
1857	February 5	The Parliament of the Province of Canada establishes a committee to investigate the activities of HBC. In particular, whether HBC is effective in promoting settlement of the region. The committee later delivers a report expressing displeasure with the current administrative policies of HBC. The committee recommends transferring land to the Province of Canada, but this is not viewed as appropriate because Canada is still only a province. Little progress is made.	
1864	January	The International Financial Society, an emerging investment company, purchases a controlling interest in the HBC. The society is more interested in leveraging the vast lands for expansion, stating in their prospectus "It has become evident that... the immense resources of the Company's territory... should be developed in accordance with the industrial spirit of the age, and the rapid advancement which colonization has [been] made in the countries adjacent."	
1867	July 1	With the Confederation of Canada, Canada becomes a federated, internally self-governing dominion of the British Empire. The new federal government quickly becomes interested in expanding westward, urged on by American interest in the lands and British desire to maintain a sphere of influence over the region.	
1867	December 21	Charles Stanley Monck, 4th Viscount Monck, Governor General of Canada, sends a despatch to Richard Temple-Nugent-Brydges-Chandos-Grenville, 3rd Duke of Buckingham and Chandos, then Secretary of State for the Colonies with a joint address from both the Senate and House of Commons requesting the annexation of "Rupert's Land and the Red River settlement" to the Dominion of Canada be submitted to the Crown for consideration.	
1868	October 2	George-Étienne Cartier, Minister of Militia and Defence and William McDougall, Minister of Public Works are selected by the Privy Council to negotiate on behalf of Canada.	
1868	October 13	Cartier and McDougall expected to arrive in the UK for negotiations.	
1868	March 9	Granville Leveson-Gower, 2nd Earl Granville, the new Secretary of State for the Colonies, issues an ultimatum to both HBC and the Canadian negotiators. Neither side accepts.	
1868	July 31	Rupert's Land Act is passed by the parliament of the United Kingdom. The act does not complete the transfer but merely confirms the support of the United Kingdom's parliament for negotiations to occur.	
1869	May 8	Cartier and McDougall submit their report to the Canadian Parliament regarding negotiations with HBC and British officials, after their return to Canada.	
1869	June 21	Government of Canada resolves to accept loan from the United Kingdom and pay the HBC company upon transferred to the dominion.	
1869	November 19	Canadian, HBC, and British negotiators sign the Deed of Surrender.	
1869	December 1	The Canadian government ratifies the agreement.	
1870	May 7	HBC forwards the finalized deal to the Colonial Office.	
1870	May 11	Canada finalizes deposits to HBC.	
1870	June 23	Queen Victoria issues an order-in-council, Rupert's Land and North-Western Territory - Enactment No. 3, to take effect on 15 July 1870.	
1870	July 15	Rupert's Land and the North-Western Territory are combined under the new name of the North-West Territories. Simultaneously, the province of Manitoba is created by the Manitoba Act.	
