= Bay Building (Vancouver) =

Building in British Columbia, Canada

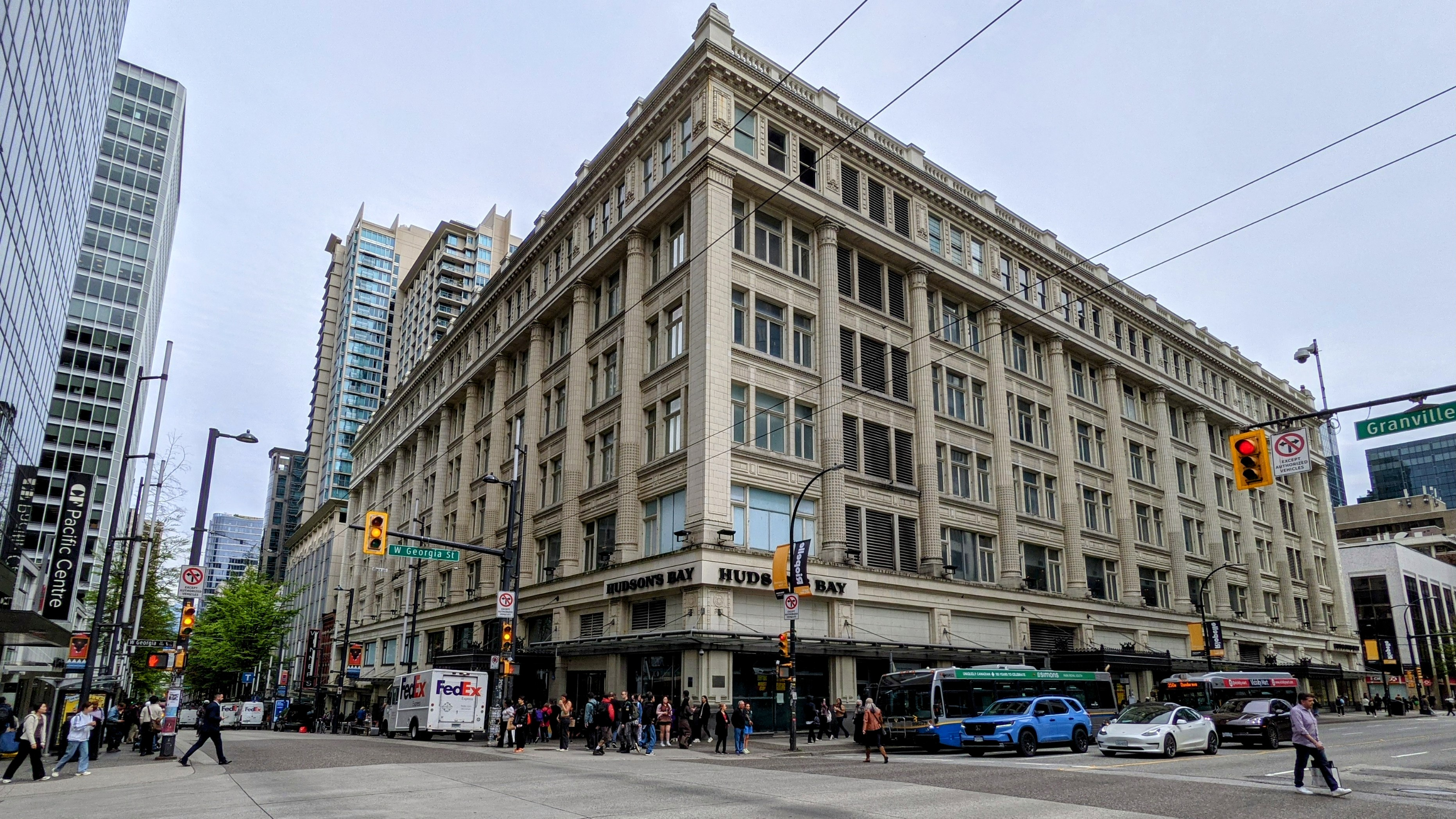
- The exterior of Hudson's Bay Vancouver
- Interactive map of the Bay Building area
- Alternative names: Hudson's Bay Vancouver Downtown

General information
- Architectural style: Edwardian
- Location: 674 Granville Street; Vancouver, British Columbia
- Coordinates: 49°16′57″N 123°7′2″W
- Current tenants: vacant
- Construction started: 1913
- Opened: March 14, 1914
- Closed: June 1, 2025

Technical details
- Floor count: 6

Design and construction
- Architects: Burke, Horwood & White
- Architecture firm: Burke, Horwood & White
- Main contractor: Rourke, MacDonald & Moncreiff

Website
- vancouver.thebaybuilding.ca

The Bay Building is a six-storey building on the corner of Granville Street and Georgia Street in downtown Vancouver, British Columbia, Canada. It was the flagship store of the Hudson's Bay department store chain until the company's closure in June 2025. The cream terra cotta building with Corinthian columns was built in 1914, 1926, and 1927. The last additions were made in 1949. The current store was built on the site of another HBC store from 1893.

== History ==
The original HBC store in Vancouver was a small storefront on Cordova between Carrall and Abbott.

On October 30, 2017, HBC announced plans to sell the building, although the store would continue operating in the location as it was under a long-term lease.

On March 21, 2025, the Hudson's Bay Company announced the permanent closure of 74 HBC stores across Canada, including the Vancouver flagship store. The remaining 15 HBC stores within the province of British Columbia began their liquidation sales on March 24, 2025, with all of the chain's 96 stores closing on June 1, 2025. Although the store closed in June 2025, the signage remained on the building's storefront until January 2026.

== See also ==
- Hudson's Bay Queen Street - flagship in Toronto
- Bay Building (Montreal) - flagship in Montreal
