= Stickeen Territories =

Colony of the British Empire

Coordinates: 58°01′00″N 131°00′00″W

- Territory of British North America
- 1862–1863
- Flag

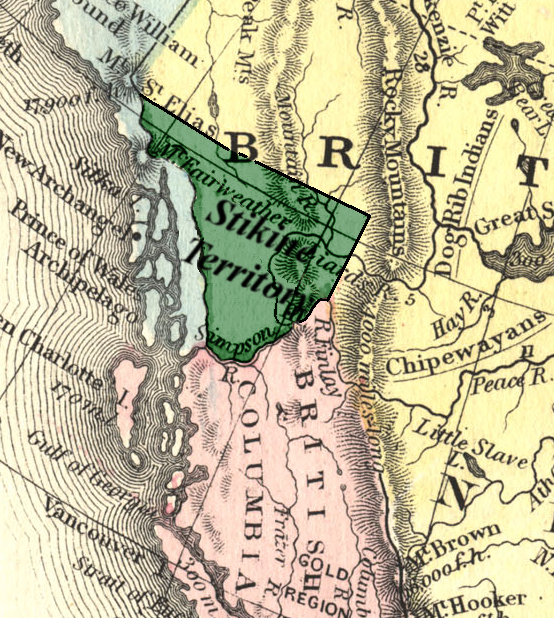
- Government
  - Type: Provisional administration
- Monarch
  - 1862–1863: Victoria
- Administrator of the Government
  - 1862-1863: James Douglas
- History
  - Established: 1862
  - Disestablished: 1863
Preceded by	Succeeded by
North-Western Territory; Russian America	Colony of British Columbia (1858-1866); Russian America

The Stickeen Territories /stɪˈkiːn/, also colloquially rendered as Stickeen Territory, Stikine Territory, and Stikeen Territory, was a territory of British North America whose brief existence began July 19, 1862, and concluded July of the following year. The region was split from the North-Western Territory in the wake of the Stikine Gold Rush. The initial strike attracted large numbers of miners — mostly American — to the region; by detaching the region from the exclusive trade zone of the Hudson's Bay Company, British authorities were able to impose tariffs and licences on the speculators. The new territory, named after the Stikine River, was under the responsibility of the Governor of the Colony of British Columbia, James Douglas, who was appointed "Administrator of the Stickeen Territories" and under British law, within the jurisdiction of the Supreme Court of British Columbia.

The boundaries of the Stickeen Territories were the 62nd parallel to the north, the 125th meridian to the east, the Nass and Finlay Rivers to the south, and the panhandle of Russian America to the west (only vaguely defined by treaty and disputed until resolved with the Alaska Boundary Settlement of 1903).

A year later, the Stickeen Territories was dissolved, most of its former land being added to the Colony of British Columbia, except for the sector north of the 60th parallel, which was returned to the North-Western Territory. In 1895, most of this strip was again redistributed, this time to the District of Yukon, as newly constituted during the midst of the Klondike Gold Rush. The remainder of the strip stayed in the Northwest Territories.

== See also ==
- Alaska boundary dispute
- Fort Stikine
- North-Western Territory
- Stikine Country
- Stikine Gold Rush
- Stikine Region
- Stikine River
