= Rupert's Land and North-Western Territory Order =

Part of the Constitution of Canada adding territory

Rupert's Land and North-Western Territory Order Décret en conseil sur la Terre de Rupert et le territoire du Nord-Ouest

Part of the Constitution of Canada
- Citation: SC 1872 p. lxiii (original citation – English); SC 1872 p. lxiii (original citation – French); RSC 1985, App. II, No. 9 (alternative citation – bilingual)
- Territorial extent: Rupert's Land; North-Western Territory; Canada
- Considered by: Cabinet of Canada; Governors of the Hudson's Bay Company; House of Commons of Canada; Senate of Canada; British government
- Enacted by: Queen-in-Council (UK)
- Enacted: May 16, 1871
- Assented to by: Victoria
- Commenced: July 15, 1870
- Authorizing legislation: Constitution Act, 1867, s. 146; Rupert's Land Act 1868

Amends
- Royal Charter for Incorporating the Hudson's Bay Company, Granted by His Majesty King Charles the Second, In the Twenty-second Year of his Reign, A.D. 1670

Text of statute as originally enacted
- Status: Current legislation

The Rupert’s Land and North-Western Territory Order (French: Décret en conseil sur la Terre de Rupert et le territoire du Nord-Ouest) is one of the enactments which make up the Constitution of Canada. It contains the deed of surrender by which the Hudson's Bay Company (HBC) surrendered ownership of Rupert's Land and the North-Western Territory to Britain. The order then transferred all that territory from Britain to Canada. The order ended 200 years of HBC control over Rupert's Land and began western Canadian expansion.

The deed of surrender is included in the order as it sets out the terms for surrender negotiated between the HBC and the government of Canada, as required by the Rupert's Land Act, 1868. Canada agreed to pay £300,000 to the HBC for the surrender, while the HBC was to retain the land for its existing posts, as set out in the deed. The HBC would also be able to claim additional land in the territory, within the next fifty years. Under the order, the British government accepted the surrender by the HBC, and then transferred the land to Canada.

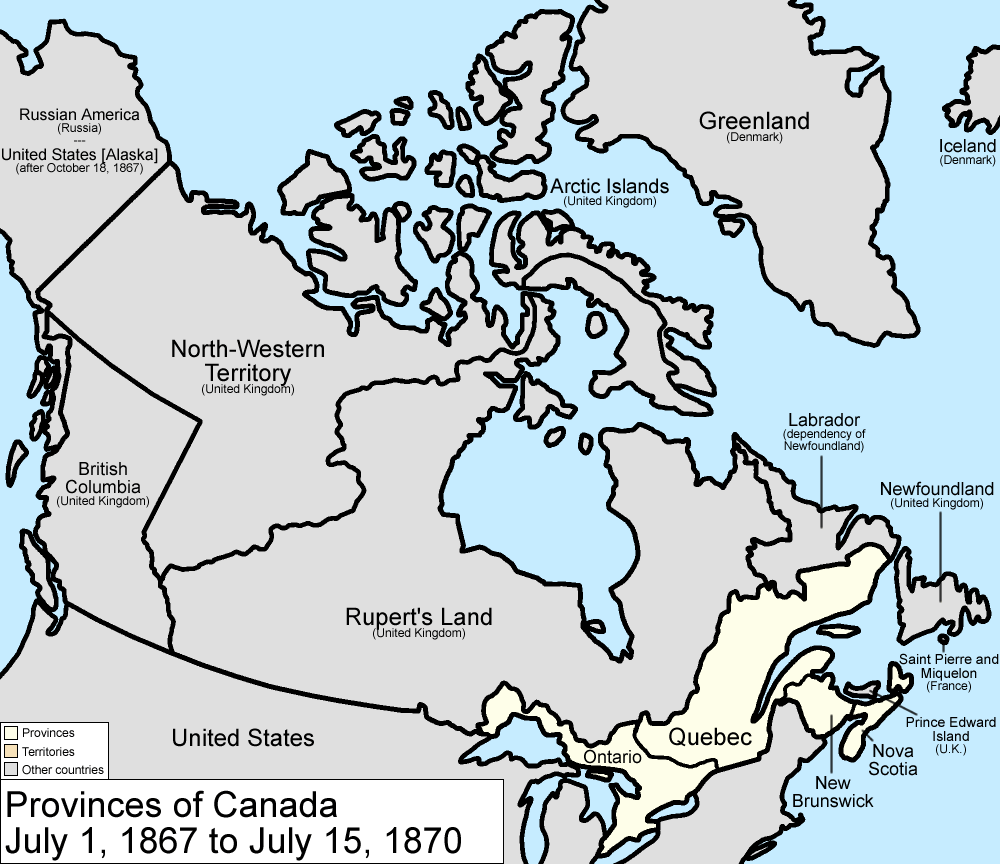
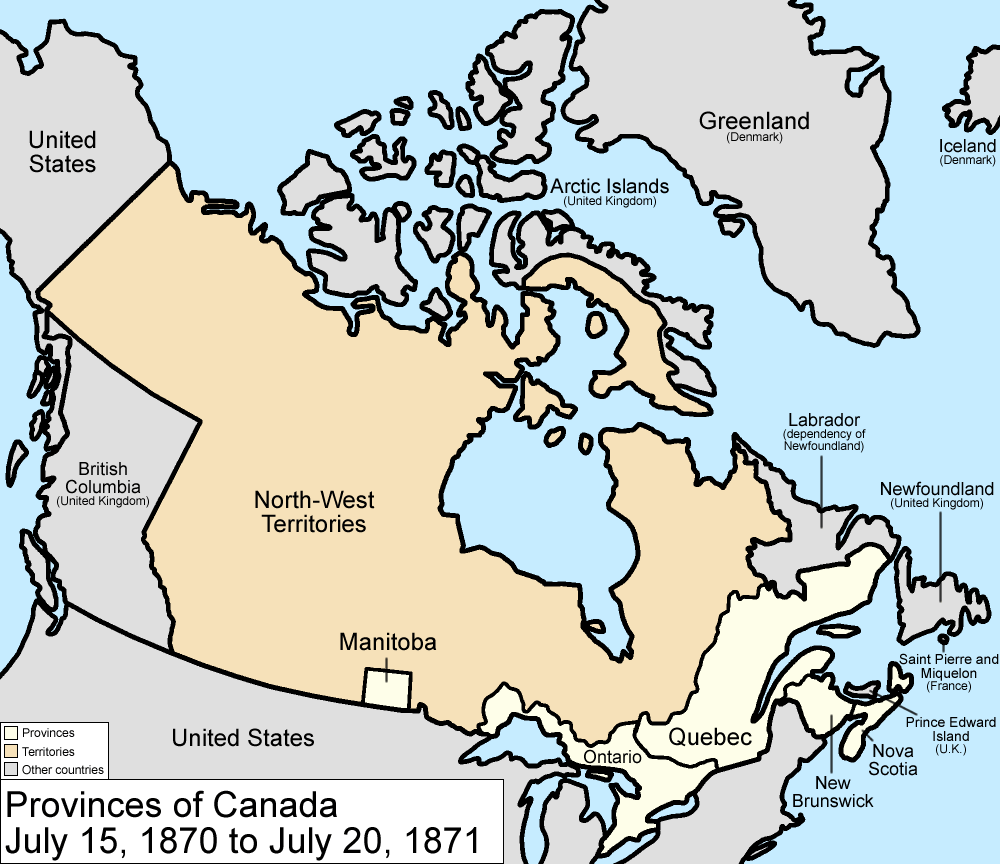
Canada before and after receiving Rupert's Land and the North-Western Territory; the Province of Manitoba and the North-West Territories were created simultaneously

== History ==
On May 2, 1670, King Charles II of England created the HBC by royal charter. The charter granted commercial rights to the HBC, giving it the right to

…the sole Trade and Commerce of all those Seas, Streights, Bays, Rivers, Lakes, Creeks, and Sounds, in whatsoever Latitude they shall be, that lie within the entrance of the Streights commonly called Hudson's Streights... which are not now actually possessed by any of our Subjects, or by the Subjects of any other Christian Prince or State... and that the said Land be from henceforth... called Rupert's Land."

In addition to the grant of commercial rights, the charter also granted property rights to "… all the Lands and Territories upon the Countries, Coasts and Confines of the Seas, Bays, Lakes, Rivers, Creeks, and Sounds aforesaid, that are not already actually possessed," and including "all mines Royal." The basis of this claim and the charter was under the principle of the doctrine of discovery, whereby the lands were considered free to claim if they were not owned already by other European nations. The Supreme Court of Canada has held that the grant also gave the Company ownership of the resources within Rupert's Land.

=== Expansion ===
Using the doctrine of discovery, the British Parliament further extended the company's domain in 1821 to the North-Western Territory as well with the passage of "An act for regulating the fur trade, and establishing a criminal and civil jurisdiction within certain parts of North America."

In 1867, with Confederation, the new Dominion of Canada sought to expand westward. In that same year, Canada's Parliament expressed this desire to the United Kingdom and soon after entered into talks with the HBC to arrange for the transfer of the territory. These talks resulted in the Deed of Surrender, which was part of an order-in-council by the United Kingdom titled "Rupert's Land and North-Western Territory - Enactment No. 3: Order of Her Majesty in Council admitting Rupert's Land and the North-Western Territory into the union, dated the 23rd day of June 1870". The Deed was approved and issued on June 23, 1870, and took effect on July 15, 1870. The Province of Manitoba, the first new province to join Confederation, was created on the same day.
