= Strellson =

Swiss menswear manufacturer

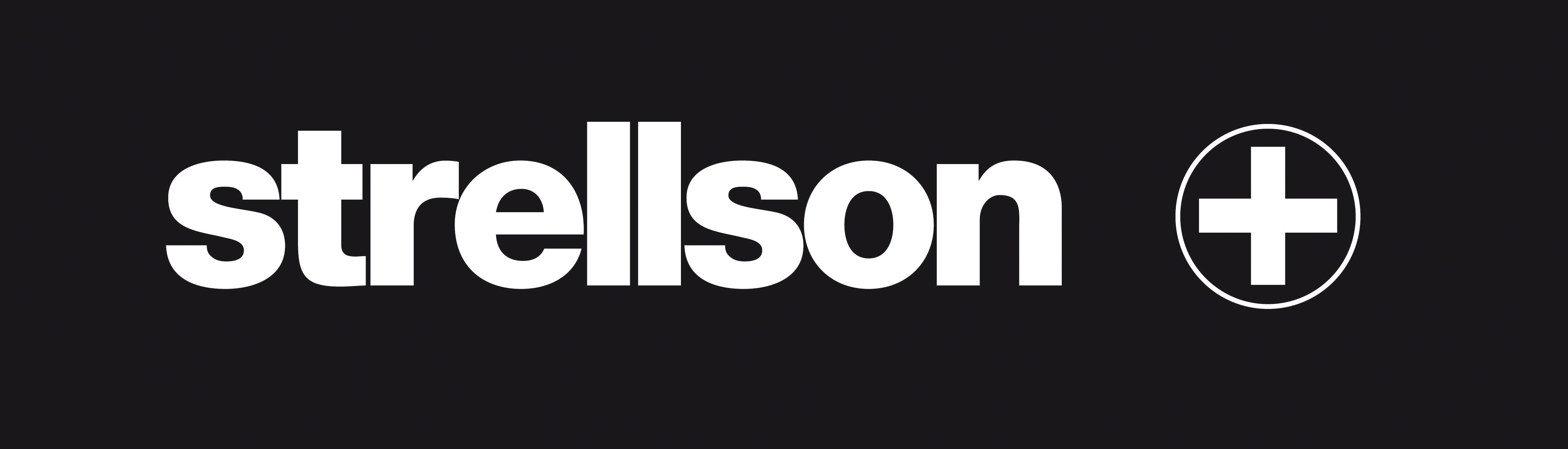
Logo of Strellson

Strellson AG, based in Kreuzlingen (TG), is Switzerland's largest menswear manufacturer.

== History ==
Strellson was founded in 1984 by fashion entrepreneurs and former Hugo Boss owners Uwe and Jochen Holy. They rebranded the coat manufacturer Friedrich Straehl & Co. AG that they had acquired in 1984. In 1985 the first collection including suits, sports jackets and trousers was released. From 1999 to 2012 Strellson held the European licence for Tommy Hilfiger Tailored Clothing. In 2003 Strellson gained prominence when they launched a limited edition of their so-called Swiss Cross jackets that were made from old military blankets. Furthermore, the Strellson AG earned 33% of the JOOP! GmbH in that year. In 2004 the Strellson AG took over the Windsor GmbH. In 2005 the Swiss Cross sportswear label was released and the firms of Strellson AG and Windsor GmbH emerged as one company under the Holy Fashion Group umbrella. In 2007 Strellson granted licences for Strellson shoes and bags to Müller & Meirer Lederwarenfabrik GmbH in Kirn, Germany. In 2008, German member of parliament Cem Özdemir, dubbed "Germany's best-dressed politician" by Men's Health magazine, participated as a model in a Strellson advertising campaign. A hooded jacket made by Strellson caused headlines in the British press in 2008 because it included a Swiss Army-style knife attached by a chain in a pocket. As the sale of knives to minors is illegal in Britain, retailers were forced to withdraw the product. 2008 a Strellson Sportswear monostore in Berlin, Germany and a Strellson monostore in Berne, Switzerland opened. The Luxess GmbH in Ratingen, Germany received a Strellson Eyewear licence. Moreover, the Joop GmbH obtained full ownership of the Strellson AG. In 2009 the Pop Art artist Mel Ramos exclusively painted two pictures for Strellson, which reappeared in the Strellson Sportswear collection spring/summer 2009. Additional monostores were opened in Graz (Austria), Lille (France) and Moscow (Russia) as well as a number of stores in China. Together with their licensing partner Mäurer & Wirtz GmbH & Co. KG, Strellson released its first fragrance line "Strellson No. 1" in 2010. In 2011 the first flagship store opened in Düsseldorf, Germany. Further stores were opened in Lyon (F), Toronto (CA), St. Petersburg (RUS) and Poland. In collaboration with cycle manufacturer Bianchi, Strellson introduced the "Rolling Style - BLACK EDITION" with a black fixed-gear bike. In May 2011 the second Strellson Premium fragrance "D.STRICT" was launched. In 2012 the first Sportswear fragrance "LOADED" and the Strellson meets Bianchi White Edition was released. Furthermore, a flagship store in Toronto, Canada was opened. In 2013 the Strellson Sportswear Edition was launched. In 2013 and 2014 new stores were opened in Munich, Cologne, Frankfurt, Shanghai, Minsk, Hong Kong, Gdansk and Mexico City. Under CEO Reiner Pichler, Strellson was acclaimed by the German business press for its two-figure annual growth during the first ten years of the brand's existence. In 2014 Reiner Pichler left the company and was replaced by Dr. Marcel Braun.

== Magazine ==
Strellson publishes a lifestyle magazine, N°1, which features the work of noted photographers. The magazine had a print run of 45,000 as of 2007 and is sold at kiosks, in bookstores and in Strellson shops.
