= Rupert's Land Act 1868 =

Act of the Parliament of the United Kingdom

Rupert's Land Act 1868 (Note: Section 1.)
- Act of Parliament
- Parliament of the United Kingdom
- Long title: An Act for enabling Her Majesty to accept a Surrender upon Terms of the Lands, Privileges, and Rights of "The Governor and Company of Adventurers of England trading into Hudson's Bay" and for admitting the same into the Dominion of Canada.
- Citation: 31 & 32 Vict. c. 105
- Territorial extent: United Kingdom

Dates
- Royal assent: 31 July 1868
- Commencement: 31 July 1868 (Note: The Acts of Parliament (Commencement) Act 1793.)
- Repealed: 9 June 1893
Other legislation
Repealed by	Statute Law Revision Act 1893
Relates to	Deed of Surrender

Status: Repealed

Text of statute as originally enacted

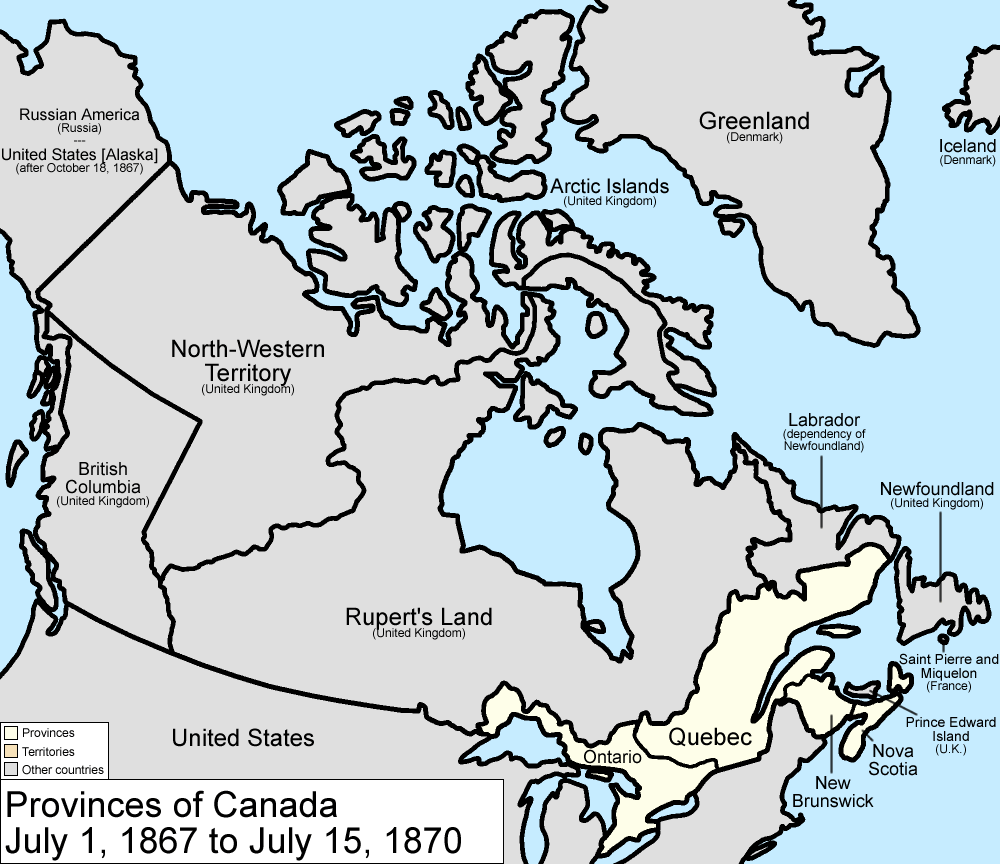
Canada, prior to receiving Rupert's Land and North-Western Territory

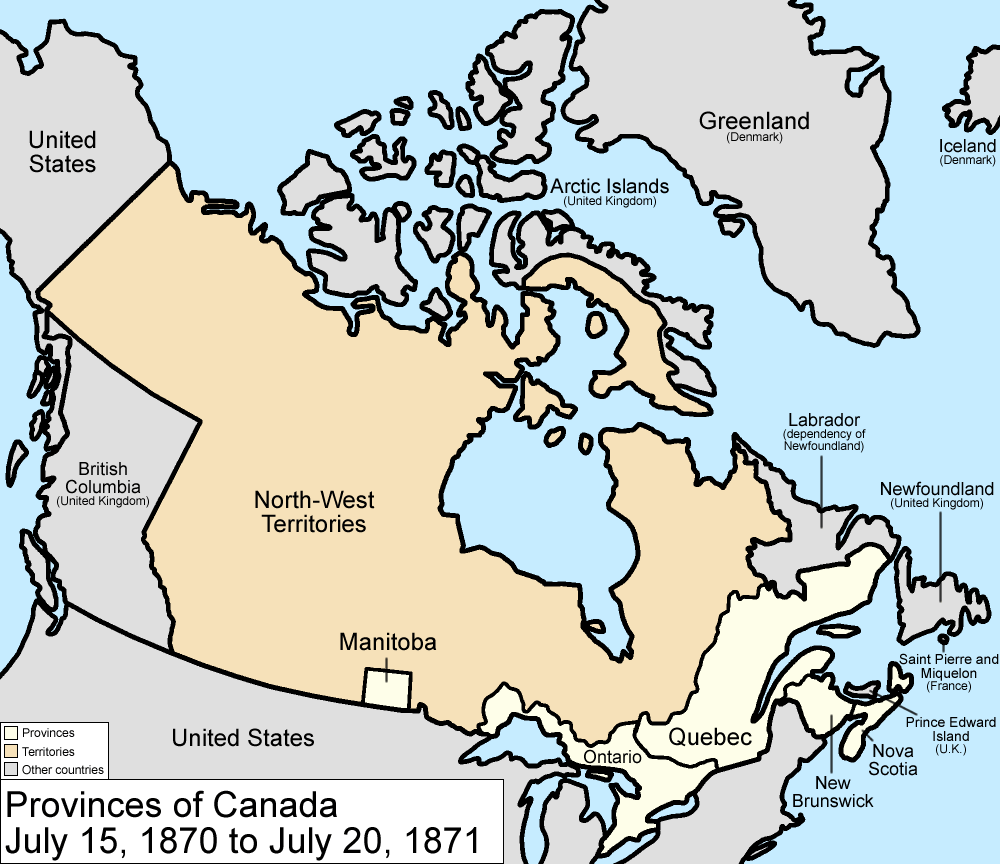
Canada after receiving Rupert's Land and North-Western Territory. Manitoba is also created as a province, simultaneously.

The Rupert's Land Act 1868(31 & 32 Vict. c. 105) was an act of the Parliament of the United Kingdom authorising the transfer of Rupert's Land from the control of the Hudson's Bay Company to the Dominion of Canada. Often confused with the Deed of Surrender, the act is different as it only expressed that the United Kingdom and Canada permitted the transfer but did not settle on the details of exchange with HBC which were then outlined in the deed.

== Subsequent developments ==
The whole act was repealed by section 1 of, and the schedule to, the Statute Law Revision Act 1893 (56 & 57 Vict. c. 14), which came into force on 9 June 1893.

== See also ==
- Legislation creating the three Canadian provinces that had been part of Rupert's Land:
  - Manitoba Act, 1870
  - Alberta Act 1905
  - Saskatchewan Act 1905
- Deed of Surrender 1870
