= North-Western Territory =

Region of British North America (1821–1870)

- Territory of British North America
- 1821–1870
- The generic red British colonial ensign

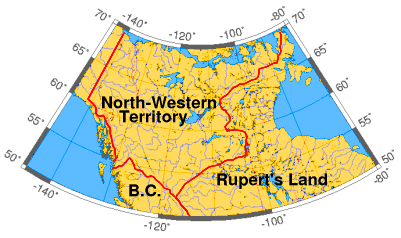
- Map of North-Western Territory, including more of Rupert's Land
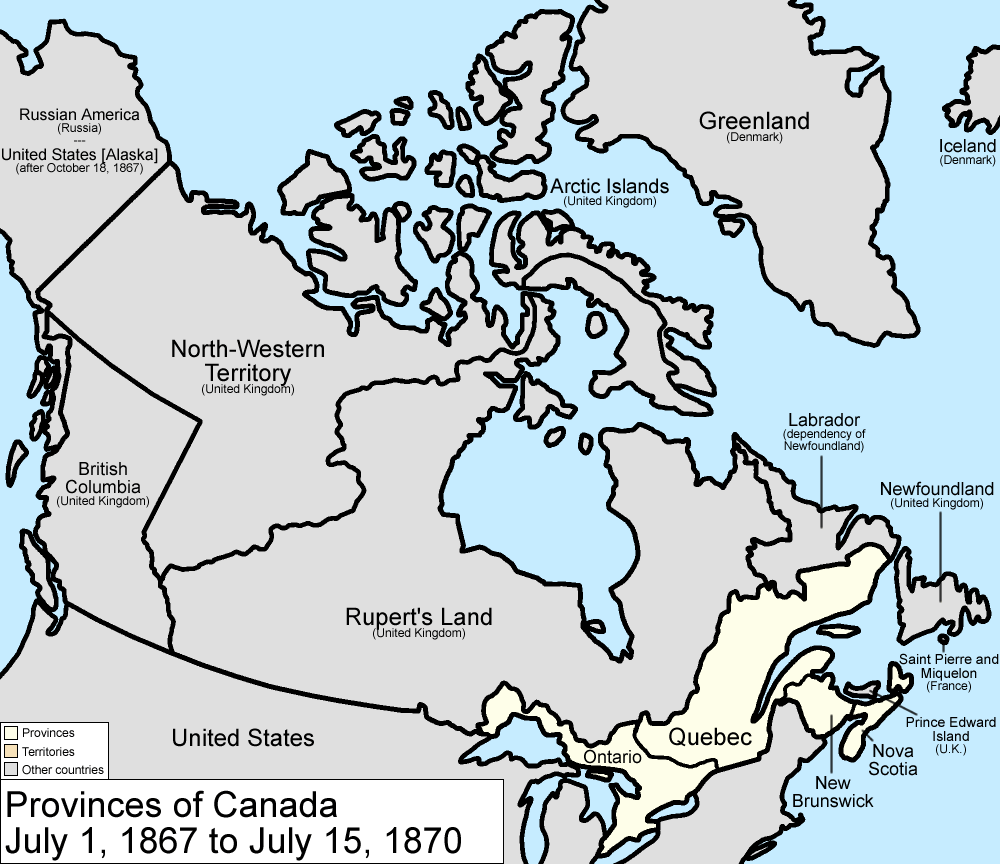
- Map of North-Western Territory, including less of Rupert's Land
- Government
  - Type: Colony under de facto company rule
- Historical era: Age of Discovery
  - Established: 1821
  - Disestablished: July 15 1870
Succeeded by
Canada
Stickeen Territories
Russian America
- Today part of: the Canadian provinces / territories of: Alberta; British Columbia; Northwest Territories; Nunavut; Saskatchewan; Yukon the U.S. state of: Alaska

The North-Western Territory was a region of British North America extant until 1870 and named for where it lay in relation to Rupert's Land.

Because of the lack of development, exploration, and cartographic limits of the time, the exact boundaries, ownership, and administration of the region were not precisely defined when the territory was extant. There is also not a definitive date when the British first asserted sovereignty over the territory. However the first assertion of jurisdiction by the British Parliament was in 1821, when it enacted An Act for regulating the fur trade, and establishing a criminal and civil jurisdiction within certain parts of North America, which clearly applied to the territory. Maps vary in defining the boundaries of the territory; however, in modern usage, the region is generally accepted to be the region bounded by modern-day British Columbia, the continental divide with Rupert's Land, Russian America (later Alaska), and the Arctic Ocean. The territory included lands that later became the Yukon, mainland Northwest Territories, northwestern mainland Nunavut, northwestern Saskatchewan, and northern Alberta.

The North-Western Territory was not technically within the area of land granted to the Hudson's Bay Company in May 1670, as the region did not drain into Hudson's Bay. However, the Hudson's Bay Company (HBC) was still the de facto administrator of the region and the territory was included in the same process of transferring Rupert's Land to Canada from the HBC, effective on July 15, 1870.

== History ==
It is obscure when exactly Great Britain first asserted sovereignty over the territory; however, after France accepted British sovereignty over the Hudson Bay coast by the Treaty of Utrecht (1713), Britain was the only European power with practical access to that part of the continent. The Hudson's Bay Company, despite the royal charter assigning only Rupert's Land to the company, had long used the region as part of its trading area. The North West Company also hunted and trapped on the land and this led to frequent conflicts between the companies. To ease tensions, the British government assigned administrative duties to the HBC, while still allowing The North West Company to hunt on the lands with the passage of "An act for regulating the fur trade, and establishing a criminal and civil jurisdiction within certain parts of North America", in 1821. As well, large areas of Rupert's Land were not accurately mapped then to know the precise boundaries. The British made almost no effort to assert sovereignty over the aboriginal peoples of the area. In accordance with the Royal Proclamation of 1763, large-scale settlement by non-aboriginal people was prohibited until the lands were surrendered by treaty.

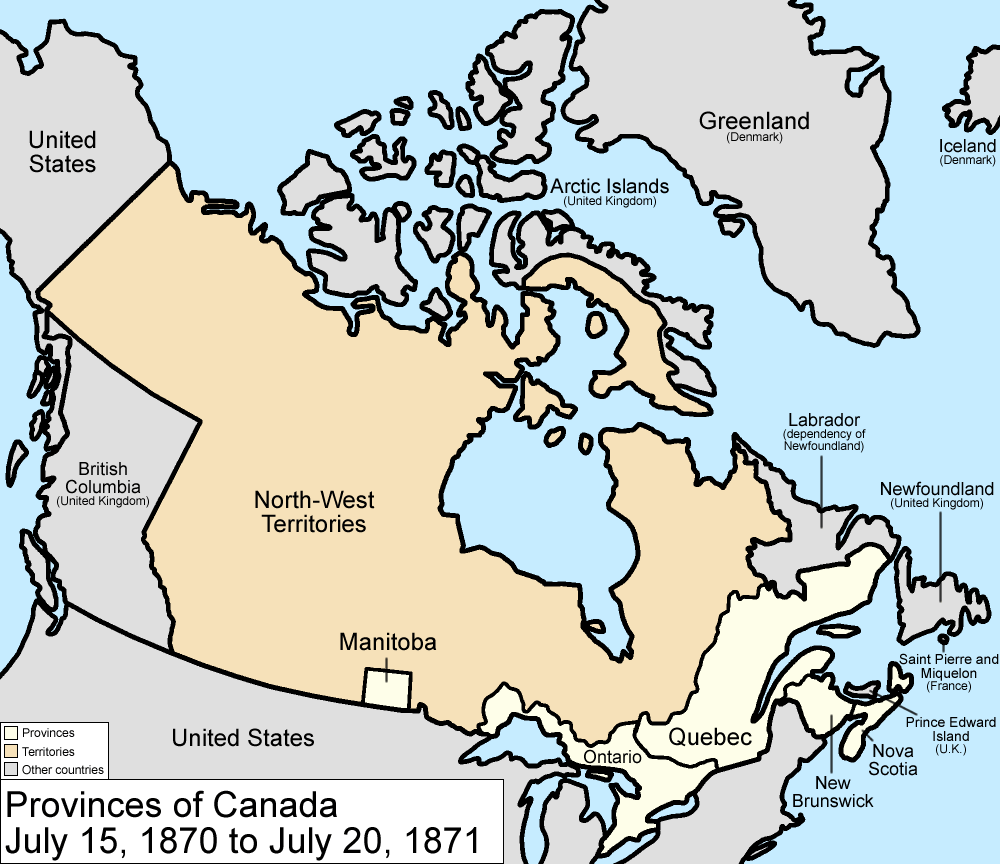
Canada provinces 1870–1871, showing the succeeding divisions of the North-Western Territory. The Northwest Territories is stylized as the North-West Territories during this period.

In 1862 during the Stikine Gold Rush, part of the North-Western Territory became the Stickeen (Stikine) Territory when the Stikine became inundated by American miners and, to prevent any resulting American claims to or agitation for the region, Governor James Douglas of the Vancouver Island and British Columbia colonies declared the area a British territory. The coastal area at the mouth of the Stikine was part of Russian America at the time, but the British had rights of free navigation to the Stikine by treaties in 1825 and 1839 as well as a lease of coastal lands to the south of it. The boundary of the North-Western Territory in this region, and likewise the Stickeen Territories created from it, south of and northwards from the Stikine, had been set as "ten marine leagues" from the sea, but this remained undefined until the Alaska Boundary Settlement of 1903. The North-Western Territory's boundary with Russian America north of the 60th Parallel had been set at the 141st line of longitude by the Treaty of St. Petersburg in 1825. The year following the creation of the Stickeen Territories, part of the Stikine returned to the North-Western Territory when boundaries were adjusted and the Colony of British Columbia was extended to the 60th parallel north, a measure which also brought into British Columbia its portion of the Peace River Block, which had not been part of the Stikine Territory. In 1868, shortly after Canadian Confederation, the Hudson's Bay Company agreed to surrender its vast territories to the new dominion. However, it was not until July 15, 1870, that the transfer to Canada was made.

On that date the North-Western Territory became part of the newly created Northwest Territories (often stylized as the North-West Territories).

In 1880, the British Arctic Territories were claimed by Canada and later formed the Northwest Territories and Nunavut.

In 1898 the Yukon Territory was formed when the areas west of the Mackenzie Mountains were removed from the Northwest Territories during the Klondike Gold Rush, again as with the Stickeen Territory to prevent efforts at American takeover and also to enable easier governance.

The North-West Territories Council was formed in 1870 and became active in 1872 when the Government of Canada appointed the first Council members.

The 1st North-West Territories Council was formed in 1876, and lasted until 1888. The 2nd Council lasted to 1891 when the NWT Legislative Assembly was formed.

== See also ==
- Former colonies and territories in Canada
- Territorial evolution of Canada after 1867
- Stikine Territory
- History of Canada
- Alaska boundary dispute
