= List of MiWay bus routes =

MiWay buses at Kipling Bus Terminal in 2025

This article lists all bus routes and their branches operated by and for MiWay, the municipal public transport agency serving Mississauga, Ontario, Canada.

== Routes ==
MiWay operates three types of routes: local, express, and high-school routes.

Legend		Designation
1–99	Regular Service	MiLocal
300s	School Service	MiLocal
100s	Express Service	MiExpress

Route		Direction and termini				Availability
1	Dundas	EB	To Kipling Terminal; Via University of Toronto Mississauga	WB	To Ridgeway Drive; Via University of Toronto Mississauga	All week, 24 hours
2	Hurontario	NB	To City Centre	SB	To Port Credit GO Station	All week, 24 hours
3	Bloor	EB	To Kipling Terminal	WB	To City Centre	All week, 24 hours
4	North Service Road	EB	To Sherway Gardens; Via Huron Park (off-peak only)	WB	To Cooksville GO Station; Via Huron Park (off-peak only)	All week
5	Dixie	NB	To Cardiff Boulevard	SB	To Long Branch Loop	All week
6	Credit Woodlands	EB	To City Centre	WB	To Westdale Mall	All week
7	Airport	NB	To Westwood Square; Via Renforth Station	SB	To City Centre; Via Renforth Station	All week, 24 hours
8	Cawthra	NB	To City Centre	SB	To Port Credit GO Station	Mon–Sat
9	Rathburn	EB	To City Centre; Via Erindale GO Station (peak hours only)	WB	To Churchill Meadows Community Centre; Via Erindale GO Station (peak hours only)	All week
10	Bristol	NB	To Meadowvale Town Centre	SB	To City Centre	All week
11	Westwood	NB	To Westwood Square	SB	To Kipling Terminal	All week
13	Glen Erin	NB	To Meadowvale Town Centre; Via South Common Centre	SB	To Clarkson GO Station; Via South Common Centre	All week
14	Lorne Park	EB	To Port Credit GO Station	WB	To Clarkson GO Station	Mon–Fri off-peak only
14A	Lorne Park	EB	To Port Credit GO Station	WB	To Winston Churchill Boulevard	Peak hours
15	Drew	EB	To Westwood Square	WB	To Cardiff Boulevard	Mon–Fri (No mid-day service)
16	Malton	CCW	To Westwood Square			Mon–Sat
16A	Malton	CW	To Westwood Square			All week
17	Hurontario	NB	To Hurontario & 407 Park and Ride	SB	To City Centre	All week, 24 hours
18	Derry	EB	To Westwood Square	WB	To Sheridan College Brampton	Peak hours
20	Rathburn	EB	To Kipling Terminal	WB	To City Centre	All week
22	Finch	EB	To William Osler Health Centre via Humber Polytechnic	WB	To Westwood Square	All week
23	Lakeshore	EB	To Long Branch Loop	WB	To Clarkson GO Station	All week
24	Northwest	NB	To Westwood Square	SB	To Renforth Station	Peak hours
25	Traders Loop	CW	To Matheson Boulevard			Peak hours
26	Burnhamthorpe	EB	To Kipling Terminal; Via City Centre (weekends only) and Islington Station	WB	To South Common Centre; Via Islington Station and City Centre (weekends only)	All week
28	Confederation	NB	To City Centre; Via Cooksville GO Station (PM peak only)	SB	To Trillium Health Centre; Via Cooksville GO Station (AM peak only)	All week
29	Park Royal	NB	To South Common Centre	SB	To Clarkson GO Station	All week
30	Rexdale	EB	To Bergamot Avenue; Via Malton GO Station (peak hours only)	WB	To Westwood Square; Via Malton GO Station (peak hours only)	Mon–Sat
31	Ogden	NB	To Dixie GO Station	SB	To Long Branch Loop	All week
35	Eglinton	EB	To Kipling Terminal	WB	To Churchill Meadows Community Centre	All week
36	Ridgeway	NB	To Winston Churchill Station	SB	To South Common Centre	All week
38	Creditview	NB	To Meadowvale Town Centre	SB	To Cooksville GO Station	All week
39	Britannia	EB	To Renforth Station; Via Paramount Centre (off-peak only)	WB	To Meadowvale Town Centre; Via Paramount Centre (off-peak only)	All week
42	Derry	EB	To Westwood Square	WB	To Meadowvale Town Centre	All week
43	Matheson	NB	To Meadowvale Town Centre	SB	To Renforth Station	Peak hours (northbound AM service only; southbound PM service only)
44	Mississauga Road	NB	To Meadowvale Town Centre	SB	To University of Toronto Mississauga	All week
45	Winston Churchill	NB	To Meadowvale Town Centre	SB	To Clarkson GO Station	All week
45A	Winston Churchill	NB	To Meadowvale Town Centre	SB	To Clarkson GO Station	Peak hours
46	Tenth Line	NB	To Meadowvale Town Centre	SB	To Erin Mills Station	All week
48	Erin Mills	NB	To Meadowvale Town Centre	SB	To University of Toronto Mississauga	All week
49	McDowell	EB	To Erin Mills Town Centre	WB	To Ninth Line	Mon–Fri (no peak hour service)
49A	McDowell	EB	To Streetsville GO Station	WB	To Ninth Line	Peak hours
51	Tomken	NB	To Bramalea GO Station	SB	To Dixie GO Station	Mon–Sat
52B	Lawrence West (TTC Contracted)	EB	To Lawrence Station via Lawrence West Station	WB	To Westwood Mall	Mon–Fri
52D	Lawrence West (TTC Contracted)	EB	To Lawrence Station via Lawrence West Station	WB	To Victory Crescent / McNaughton Avenue	Sat & Sun, Holidays
53	Kennedy	NB	To Hurontario & 407 Park and Ride	SB	To Cooksville GO Station	Mon–Fri
57	Courtneypark	EB	To Renforth Station	WB	To Sheridan College Brampton	Mon–Fri
57A	Courtneypark	EB	To Renforth Station	WB	To Sheridan College Brampton	Mon–Fri
61	Mavis	NB	To Sheridan College Brampton	SB	To City Centre	All week
66	McLaughlin	NB	To Sheridan College Brampton	SB	To City Centre	All week
68	Terry Fox	NB	To Bancroft Drive	SB	To City Centre	All week
70	Keaton	EB	To Kipling Terminal	WB	To Milverton Drive	Peak hours (northbound PM service only; southbound AM service only)
71	Sheridan	EB	To Kipling Terminal	WB	To Sheridan Research Park	Peak hours (westbound AM service only; eastbound PM service only)
73	Kamato	NB	To Ambler Drive (Kamato Loop)	SB	To Dixie Station	Peak hours
74	Explorer	EB	To Renforth Station	WB	To Dixie Station	Peak hours
90	Terragar-Copenhagen Loop	EB	To Meadowvale Town Centre; Via Meadowvale GO Station (peak hours only)	WB	To Meadowvale Town Centre	Mon–Fri
101	Dundas Express	EB	To Kipling Terminal; Via University of Toronto Mississauga	WB	To Ridgeway Drive; Via University of Toronto Mississauga	All week
103	Hurontario Express	NB	To Brampton Gateway Terminal	SB	To Trillium Health Centre	All week
107	Malton Express	NB	To Humber Polytechnic	SB	To City Centre	All week
108	Financial Express	NB	To Meadowvale Business Park	SB	To Kipling Terminal	Peak hours (northbound AM service only; southbound PM service only)
109	Meadowvale Express	NB	To Meadowvale Town Centre; Via City Centre	SB	To Kipling Terminal; Via City Centre	All week
110	University Express	NB	To City Centre; Via University of Toronto Mississauga	SB	To Clarkson GO Station; Via University of Toronto Mississauga	All week
126	Burnhamthorpe Express	EB	To Kipling Terminal	WB	To University of Toronto Mississauga	Peak hours
135	Eglinton Express	EB	To Kipling Terminal	WB	To Winston Churchill Station	Peak hours
302	Philip Pocock Secondary School	EB	N/A	WB	To City Centre; Via Bloor Street	Regular school year
304	Father Goetz Secondary School	EB	N/A	WB	To Father Goetz Secondary School	Regular school year
305	Streetsville Secondary School	NB	To Old Derry Road	SB	To Streetsville Secondary School	Regular school year
306	Streetsville Secondary School	NB	To Streetsville Secondary School	SB	To Mavis Road	Regular school year
307	Philip Pocock Secondary School	EB	To Kipling Terminal	WB	To Philip Pocock Secondary School	Regular school year
312	Glenforest Secondary School	EB	To Glenforest Secondary School	WB	To City Centre	Regular school year
313	Streetsville Secondary School	NB	To Meadowvale Town Centre	SB	To Streetsville Secondary School	Regular school year
314	Rick Hansen Secondary School	NB	To Rick Hansen Secondary School	SB	To Creditview Road & Bristol Road West	Regular school year
315	Rick Hansen Secondary School	NB	To Rick Hansen Secondary School	SB	To City Centre	Regular school year
321	Stephen Lewis Secondary School	NB	To Stephen Lewis Secondary School and St. Joan of Arc Secondary School	SB	To Winston Churchill Boulevard	Regular school year

=== TTC-contracted route ===
One Toronto Transit Commission (TTC) route, 52B/52D Lawrence West, is operated by the TTC contracted on behalf of the City of Mississauga. The fare payment method is the same as for regular MiWay buses; via a Presto card, contactless, or cash. As a result of the One Fare program, transfers between the two systems are now free.

From 2002 to 2010, another route 32B Eglinton West, operated to Explorer Drive in a similar arrangement.

== See also ==
- MiWay
- List of Toronto Transit Commission bus routes
