= Erin Mills Town Centre =

Shopping mall in Canada

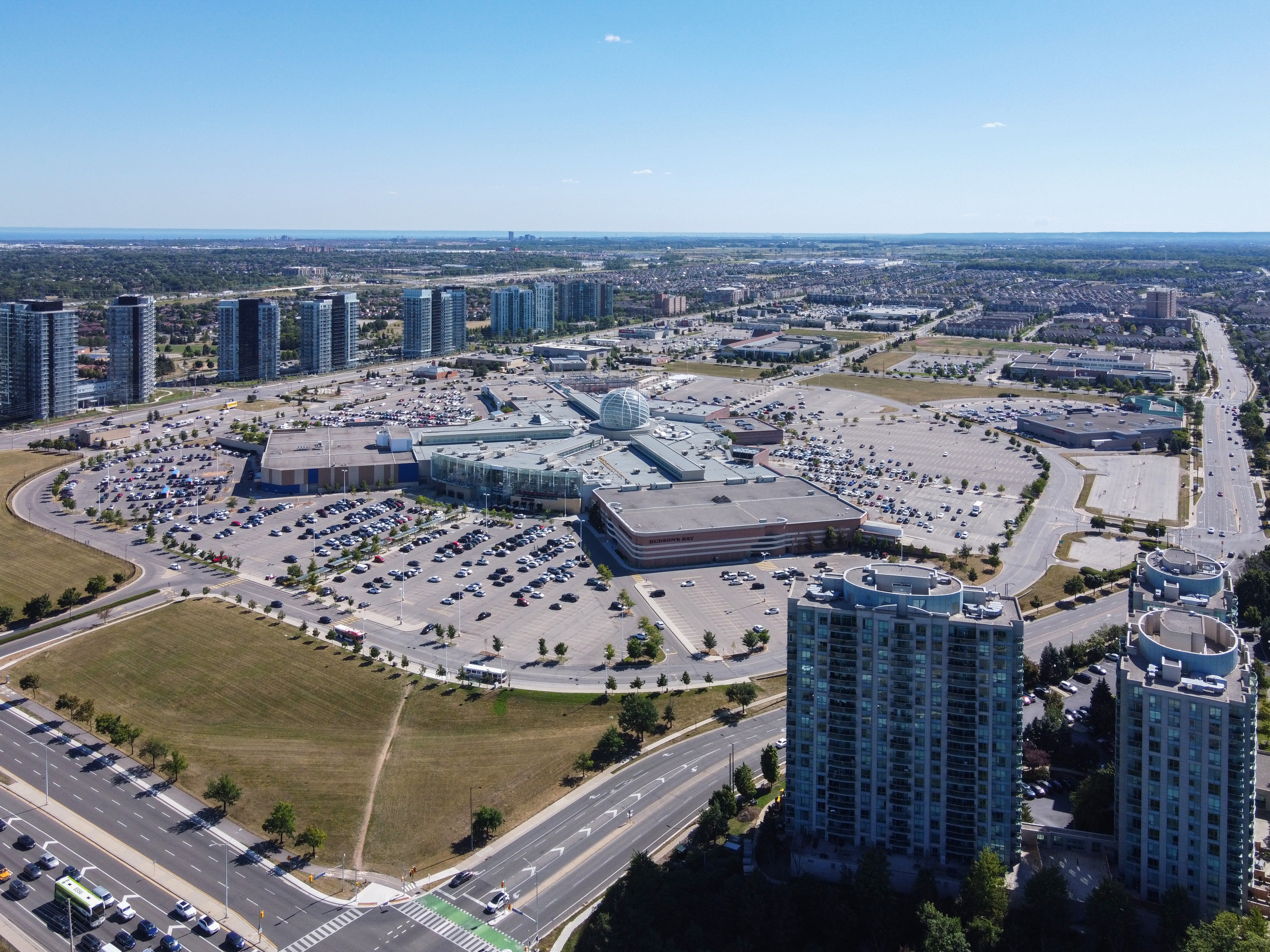
- Erin Mills Town Centre
- Location: Mississauga, Ontario, Canada
- Coordinates: 43.558509°N 79.712452°W
- Address: 5100 Erin Mills Parkway
- Opened: 1989
- Developer: Cadillac Fairview
- Manager: Cushman & Wakefield Asset Services
- Owner: Ontario Pension Board
- Num. of stores: 220
- Num. of anchor tenants: 5
- Floor area: 799,000 square feet (70,000 m^{2})
- Floors: 2
- Parking: 4,517 spaces
- Public transit: Erin Mills Town Centre Bus Terminal
- Website: erinmills.ca

Erin Mills Town Centre is a shopping mall located in Erin Mills, Mississauga, Ontario, Canada, at the corner of Erin Mills Parkway and Eglinton Avenue West. It is the second largest mall in Mississauga after Square One Shopping Centre. The mall can be accessed from highways 401, 403, and 407. Erin Mills Town Centre Bus Terminal is located directly at the back of the mall.

== History ==
Erin Mills Town Centre was built on a land that had been accumulated by E. P. Taylor's "Don Mills Developments" in 1954. The mall opened in 1989 and was owned and managed by Cadillac Fairview until it was purchased by the Ontario Pension Board in 2010 for $370 million (CAD). Excavation for the mall was started in 1987, and completed in 1989. There was a large clock tower at the centre of the mall, though this was replaced with a glass sphere during the (CAD) $100 million redevelopment. A Cineplex Odeon movie theatre was closed in 2000 and was replaced by Old Navy and Sport Chek stores. In addition, there was a daycare which was converted to retail space in 2005. The mall also had a mini-golf course located in the centre court, but it was converted into an upscale café. In 2008, a plaza outside the mall, but on the mall grounds was built. The plaza consisted of Indigo Books, LCBO, and more. There was also an older plaza located on mall grounds (which was previously a Loblaws grocery store opened in 1992) which consisted of Dollarama, HomeSense, Menchies, and also a salon.

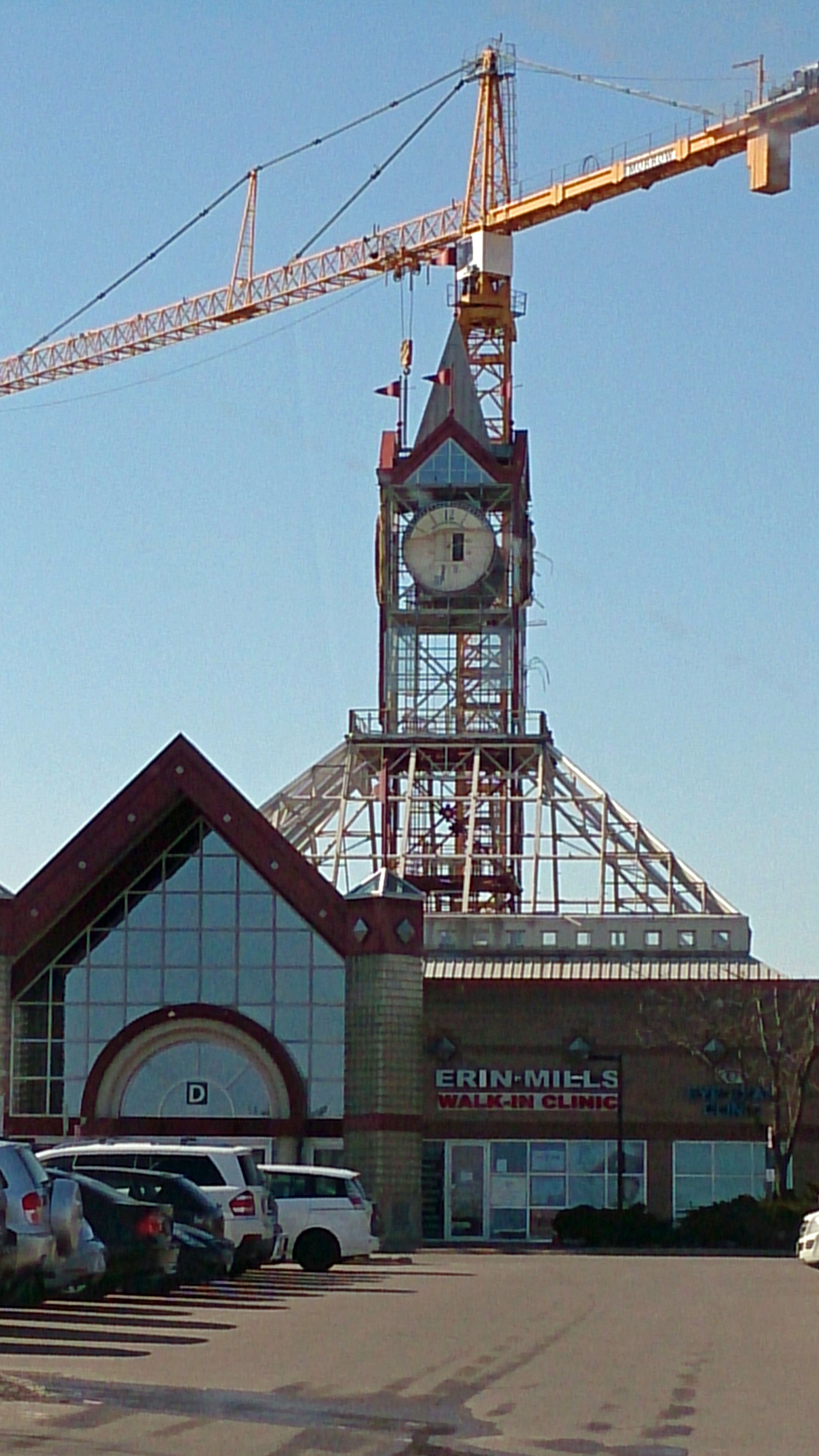
The original clock tower over the centre court being dismantled in 2014

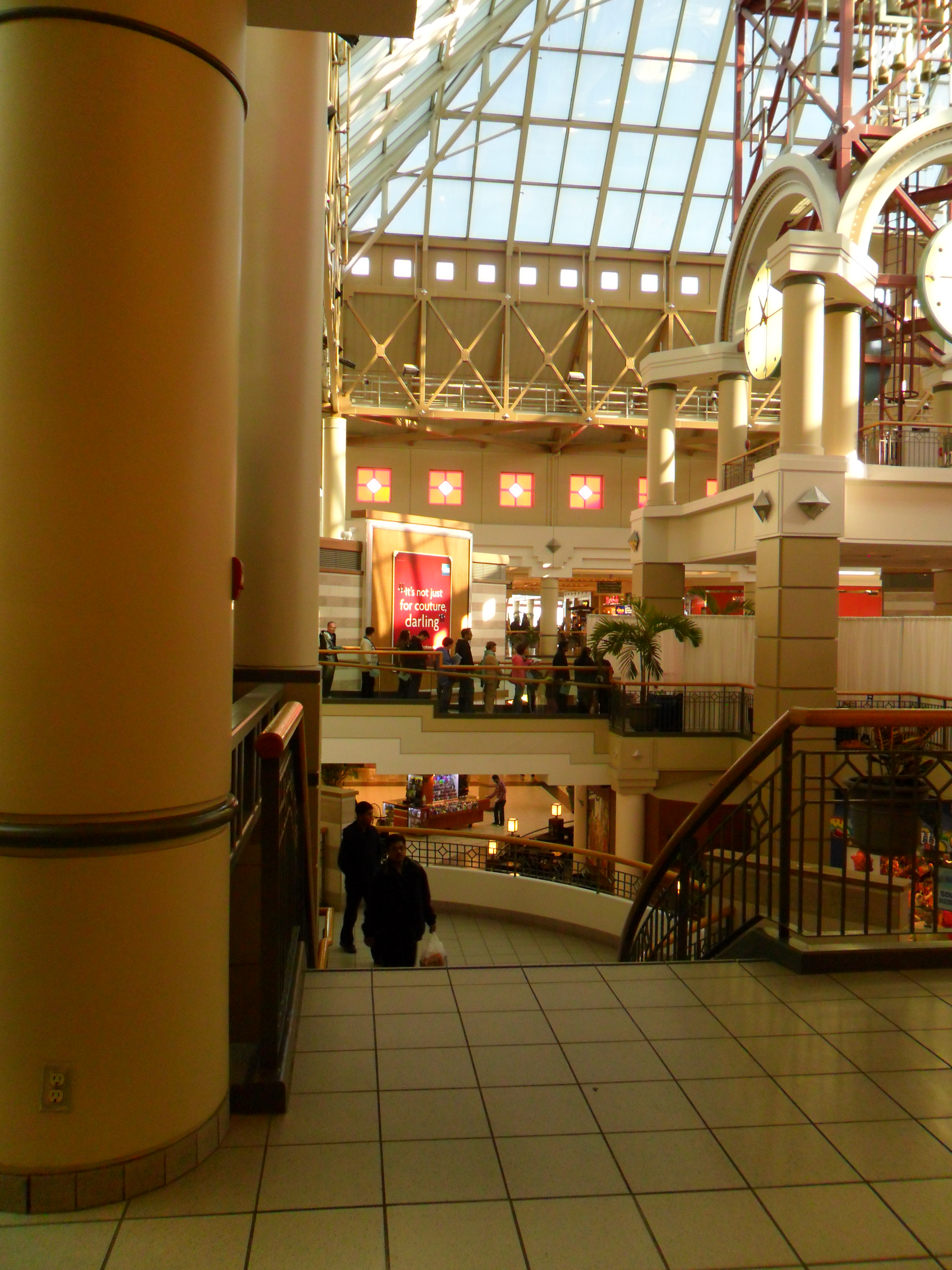
Atrium of the clock before redevelopment (2011)

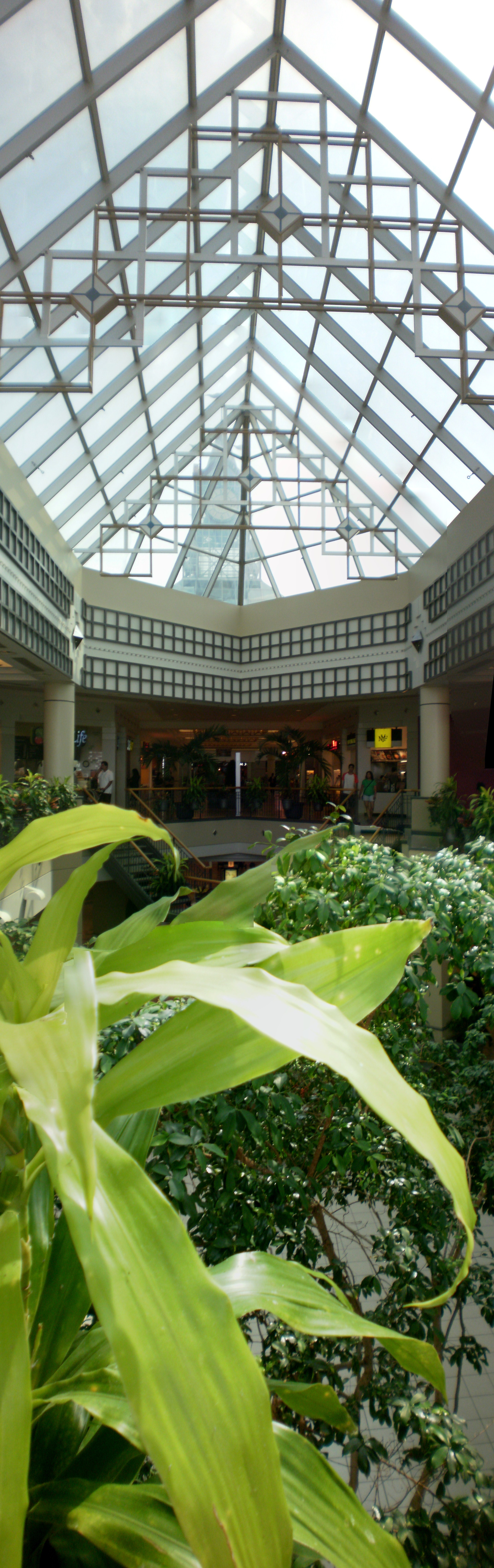
View from the second floor food court down to the centre of the mall prior to redevelopment (2011)

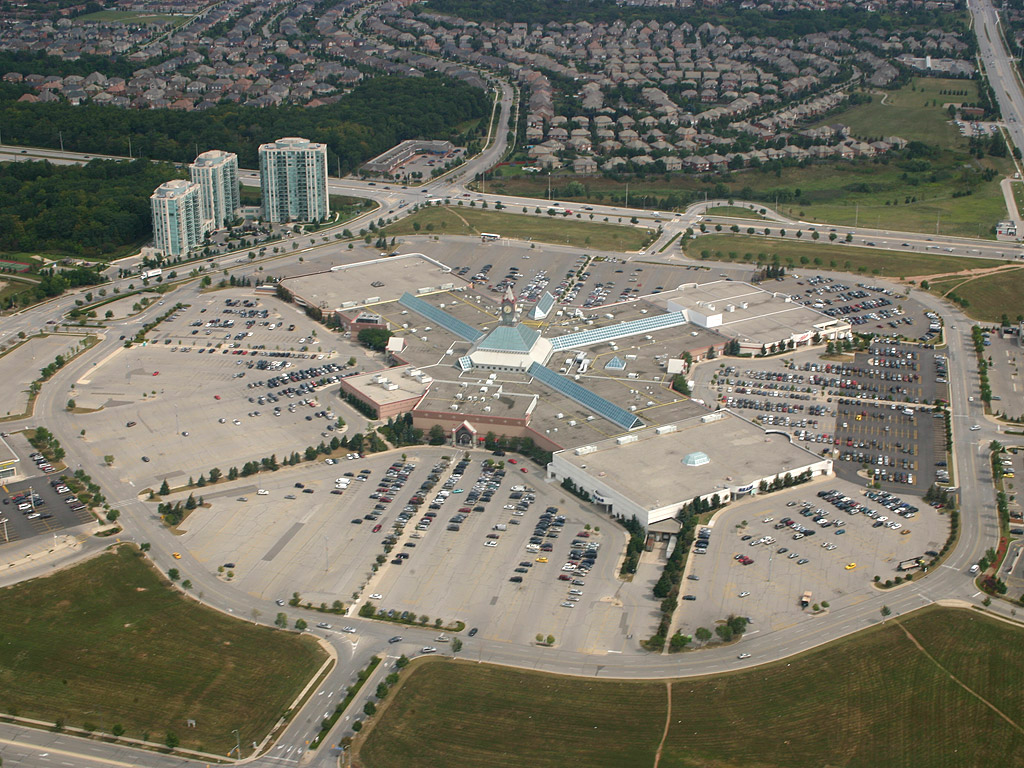
Aerial view of the mall in 2006

=== Redevelopment ===
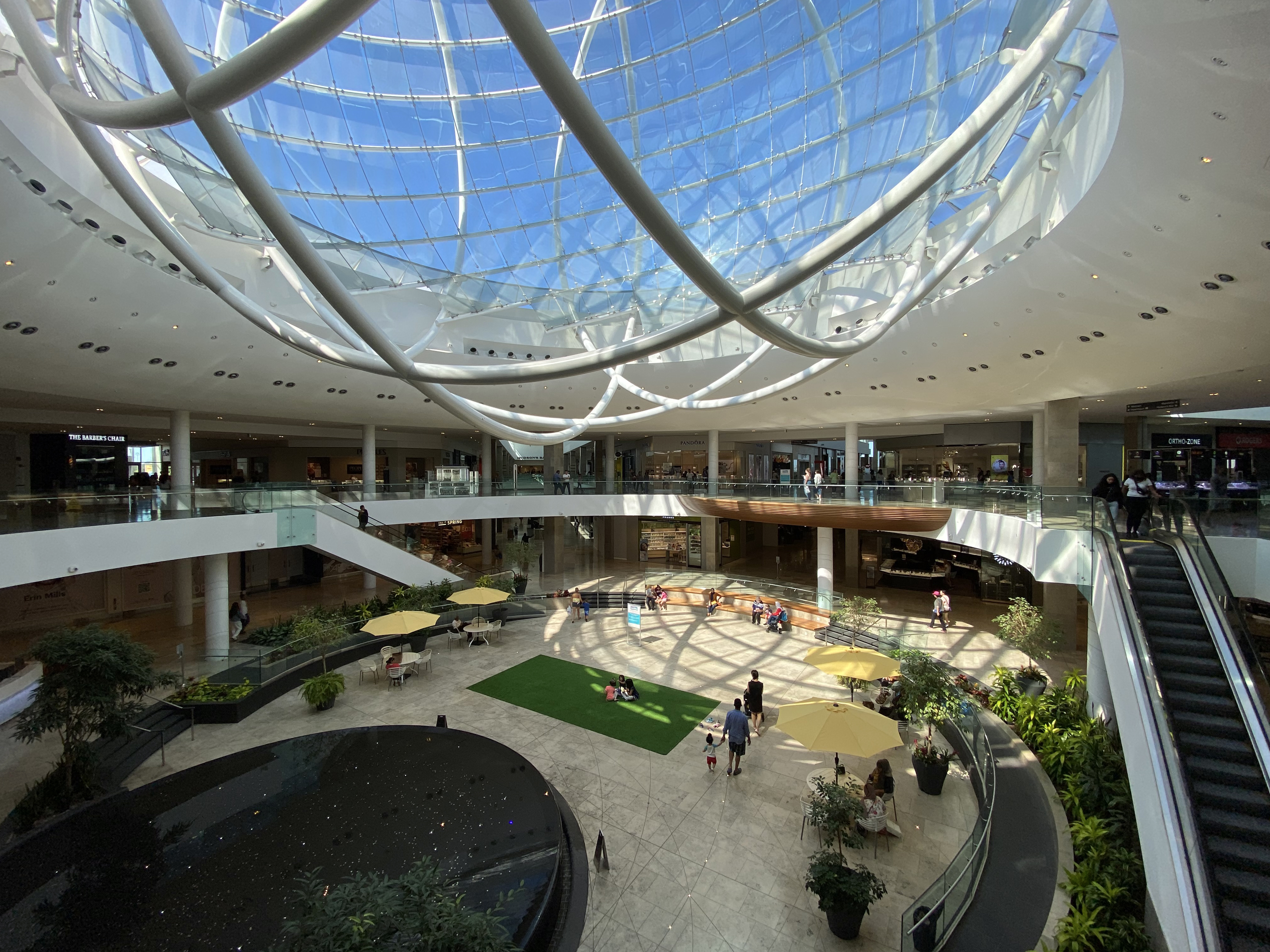
Atrium of Erin Mills Town Centre after renovation

In July 2013, a $100 million redevelopment was announced which would include the replacement of the centre court clock tower with a glass sphere 283 feet in circumference that would open up sightlines and increase the amount of natural light. The removal of the clock tower also allowed for a true centre court and infinity fountain to be installed. The centre court is also used to host events and activities, as well as a Christmas tree and Santa village during the holidays. This renovation would be the first major renovation since mall opening in 1989. Other renovations would include elevating the skylights and replacing them with modern clerestory windows, new LED lighting, new European limestone flooring and a new main entrance. The food court was completed in Spring 2015 and was completely redesigned and expanded. It featured high ceilings and large windows. Many stores, including Shoppers Drug Mart, were renovated for a modern look, matching the redevelopment.

The construction developer was Broccolini Construction Inc. and mandated by 20Vic Management, renovating approximately 800,000 square feet (74,000 m^{2}) and adding an extra 25,000 square feet (2,300 m^{2}) of expansion through the food court and other shopping areas. Erin Mills Town Centre remained open throughout the redevelopment, but opened at 8:00 AM every weekday.

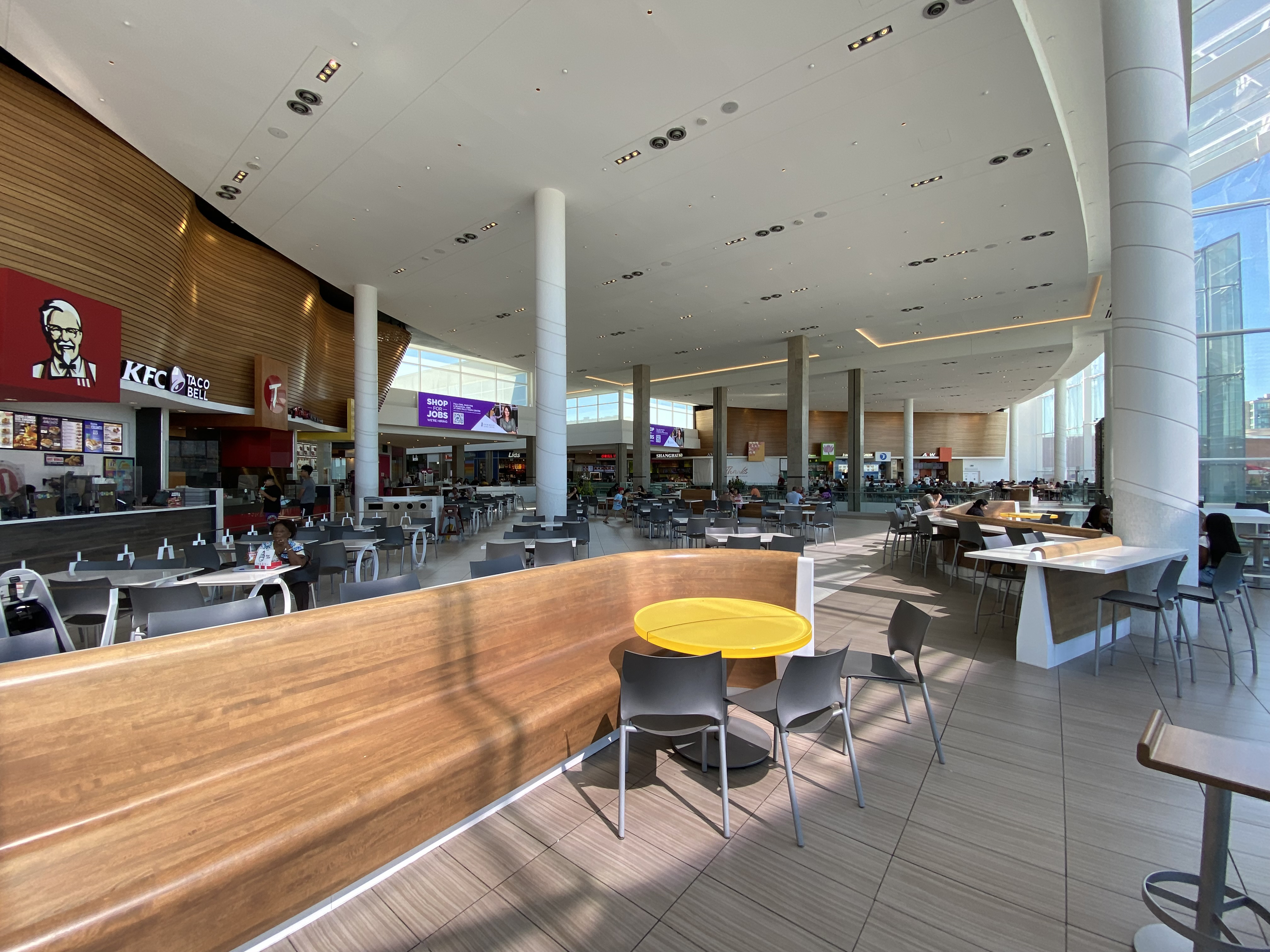
Food Court after renovation

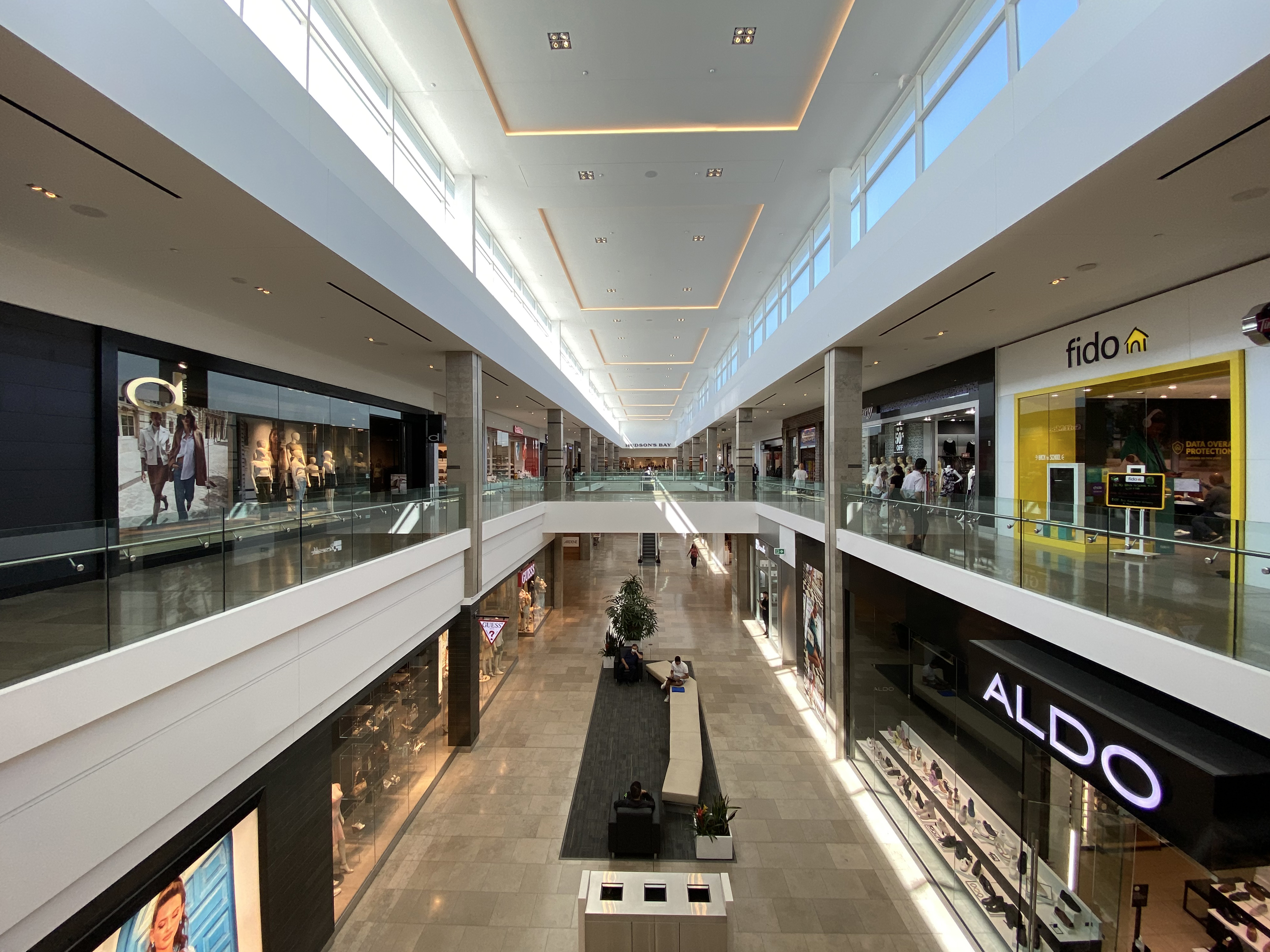
Interior of the mall

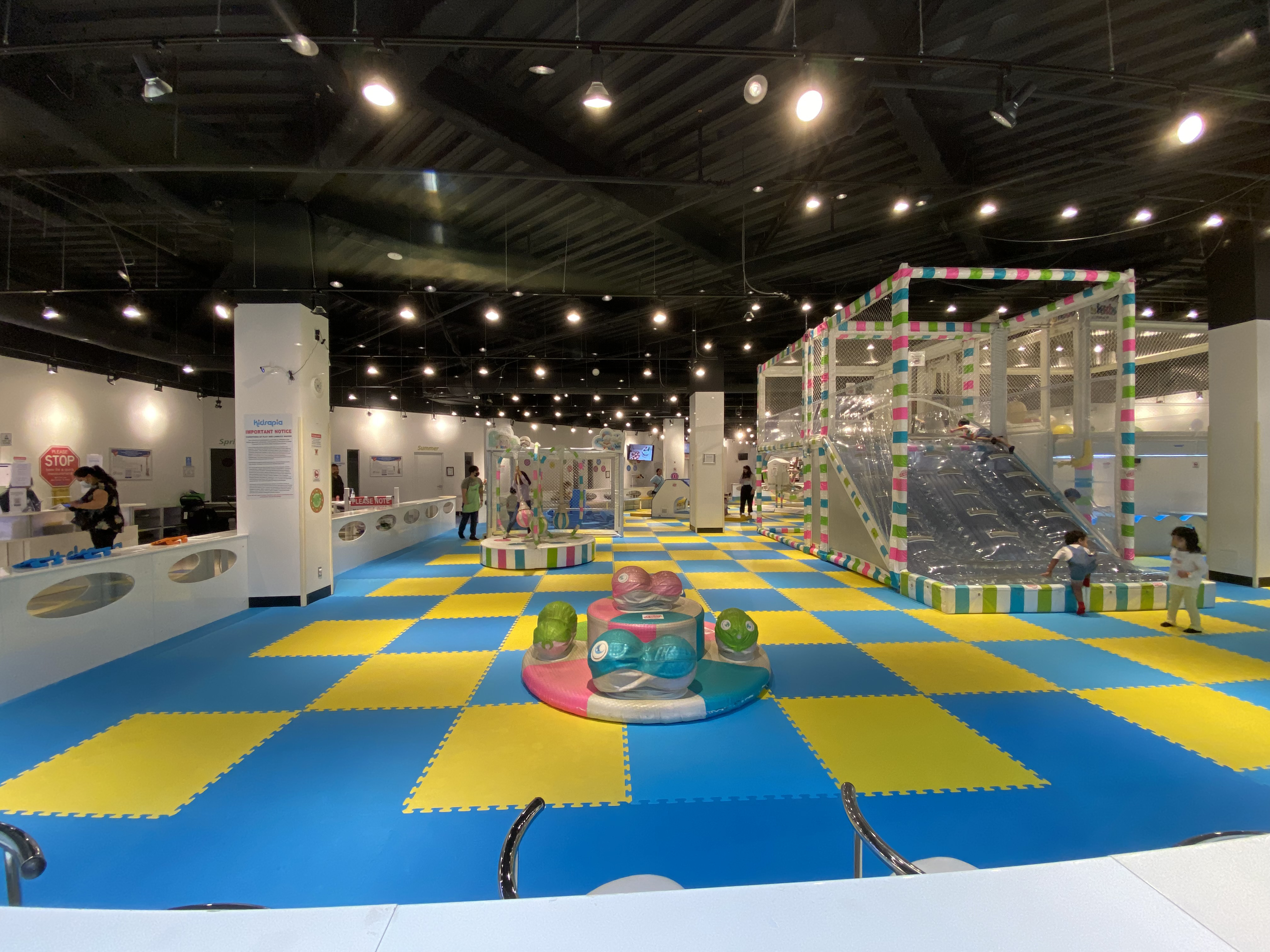
Kidsapia

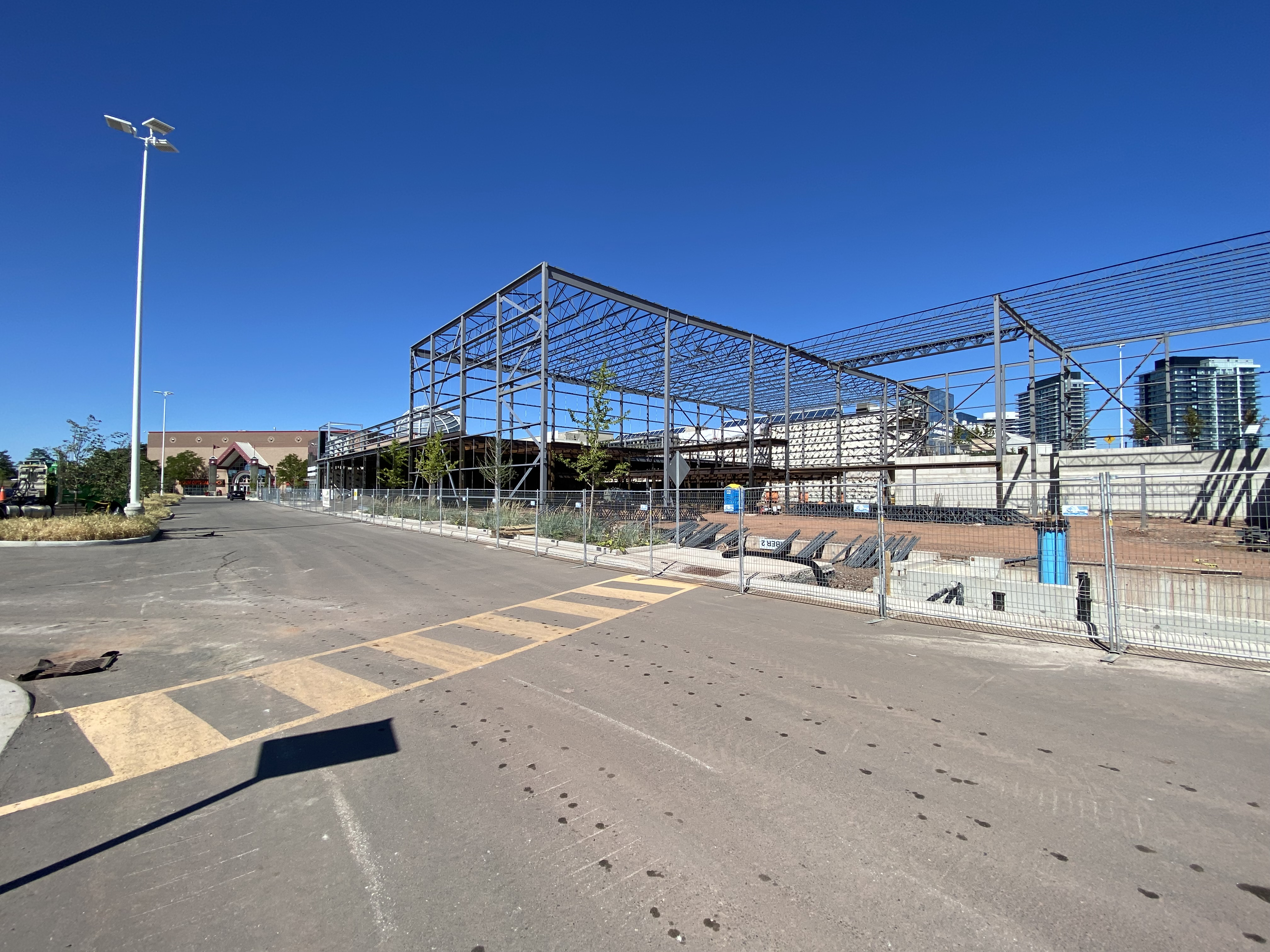
Cineplex Cinema construction site in August 2022

=== Incidents ===
Shortly after 8 p.m. on October 16, 2012, a robbery occurred at the mall's Peoples Jewellers store. The robbers managed to take an undisclosed amount of money, and jewellery. There were no injuries.

On June 11, 2014, during the $100 million mall renovation, there was an incident, injuring a worker. Shortly after 11 p.m., a roof truss collapsed, causing other beams to fall, one falling on the worker, pinning him under a steel beam. The worker was airlifted from Credit Valley Hospital, by Ornge air ambulance to a nearby trauma centre in Toronto.

Shortly after 3 p.m. on January 19, 2025, a robbery occurred at the mall's Charm Diamond Centre store. The robbers managed to take an undisclosed amount of money, and jewellery.

== Anchors ==
Current anchors:

- Walmart - formerly Target, Zellers, and Eaton's

Former anchors:

- Sears - redeveloped as mall space, including Marshalls and Cineplex
- Hudson's Bay - closed on June 1, 2025

== Films & TV ==
Erin Mills Town Centre has been used as a filming location for several films, including Noam Chomsky's Manufacturing Consent: Noam Chomsky and the Media (1992), Hedwig and the Angry Inch (2001), and Confessions of a Teenage Drama Queen (2004) starring Lindsay Lohan. The now-closed Erin Mills Cineplex Odeon theatre was also used as a set for the film Dirty Work (1998).

Erin Mills Town Centre has served as the scene for the Canadian game show Instant Cash.

== See also ==
- List of largest shopping malls in Canada
