= Your Dollar Store with More =

Canadian variety store chain

- Industry: Retail, variety, discount
- Founded: 1998 in Merritt, British Columbia, Canada
- Founders: Russ Meszaros; Sherry Meszaros
- Headquarters: 160 Dougall Road South; Unit 200; Kelowna, British Columbia; V1X 3J4
- Number of locations: 163 (2003); 175 (2004)
- Area served: Most of Canada
- Website: dollarstore.ca

Your Dollar Store with More Inc. is a Canadian chain of variety stores based in Kelowna, British Columbia.

== History ==
The chain began with a single store in 1998, founded by Russ and Sherry Meszaros. The chain expanded quickly in the early 2000s, and by 2003 it had grown to 140 stores in Canada. The chain's expansion was fueled by a combination of a low franchise fee ($15,000 CAD), and a wide selection of products, including those above $1, which the company claims is part of what makes it a "higher-end concept". By 2004, the chain had grown to 175 stores, becoming the second-largest franchised dollar store in the country, then behind the Ontario-based A Buck or Two. The chain is now considered the largest franchised dollar store in Canada. (Dollarama, with 1,400 locations in Canada, is also a dollar store, but it is not a franchise.)
