= Erin Mills Town Centre Bus Terminal =

Bus terminal in Mississauga, Ontario, Canada

Erin Mills Town Centre

General information
- Location: 5100 Erin Mills Parkway; Mississauga, Ontario; Canada
- Coordinates: 43°33′38″N 79°42′38.7″W
- Owner: City of Mississauga
- Bus stands: 3
- Bus operators: MiWay

Construction
- Parking: Yes, Erin Mills Town Centre parking lot, not overnight.
Location

Erin Mills Town Centre is a MiWay bus terminal located in western Mississauga, Ontario, Canada. It is situated on the northeast end of Erin Mills Town Centre.

Despite being a major bus terminal, it does not contain a building. Instead, it is composed of benches and one bus shelter on the opposite side. It is also not directly connected to the mall and requires walking through the parking lots. The terminal, along with South Common Centre, could possibly be relocated to Erin Mills station of the Mississauga Transitway, for more connectivity with other routes that are planned to serve the station.

== Bus routes ==
Bus service within the terminal itself is exclusively by MiWay.

=== Directly serving the terminal ===
All routes are wheelchair-accessible.

| Route | | Destination |
|---|---|---|
| 9 | Rathburn | Churchill Meadows Community Centre to City Centre via Credit Valley Hospital and Erindale GO Station |
| 13 | Glen Erin | Meadowvale Town Centre to Clarkson GO Station via South Common Centre |
| 46 | Tenth Line | Meadowvale Town Centre to Erin Mills Station |
| 48 | Erin Mills | Meadowvale Town Centre to University of Toronto Mississauga via Credit Valley Hospital, Erin Mills Station, and South Common Centre |
| 49 | McDowell | Ninth Line |

=== Indirectly serving the terminal ===
| Route | | Destination | Connects at |
|---|---|---|---|
| 35 | Eglinton | Churchill Meadows Community Centre to Kipling Bus Terminal | Eglinton Avenue |
| 135 | Eglinton Express | Winston Churchill Station to Kipling Bus Terminal | Eglinton Avenue |
