= South Common Centre Bus Terminal =

Bus terminal in Mississauga, Ontario, Canada

South Common Centre
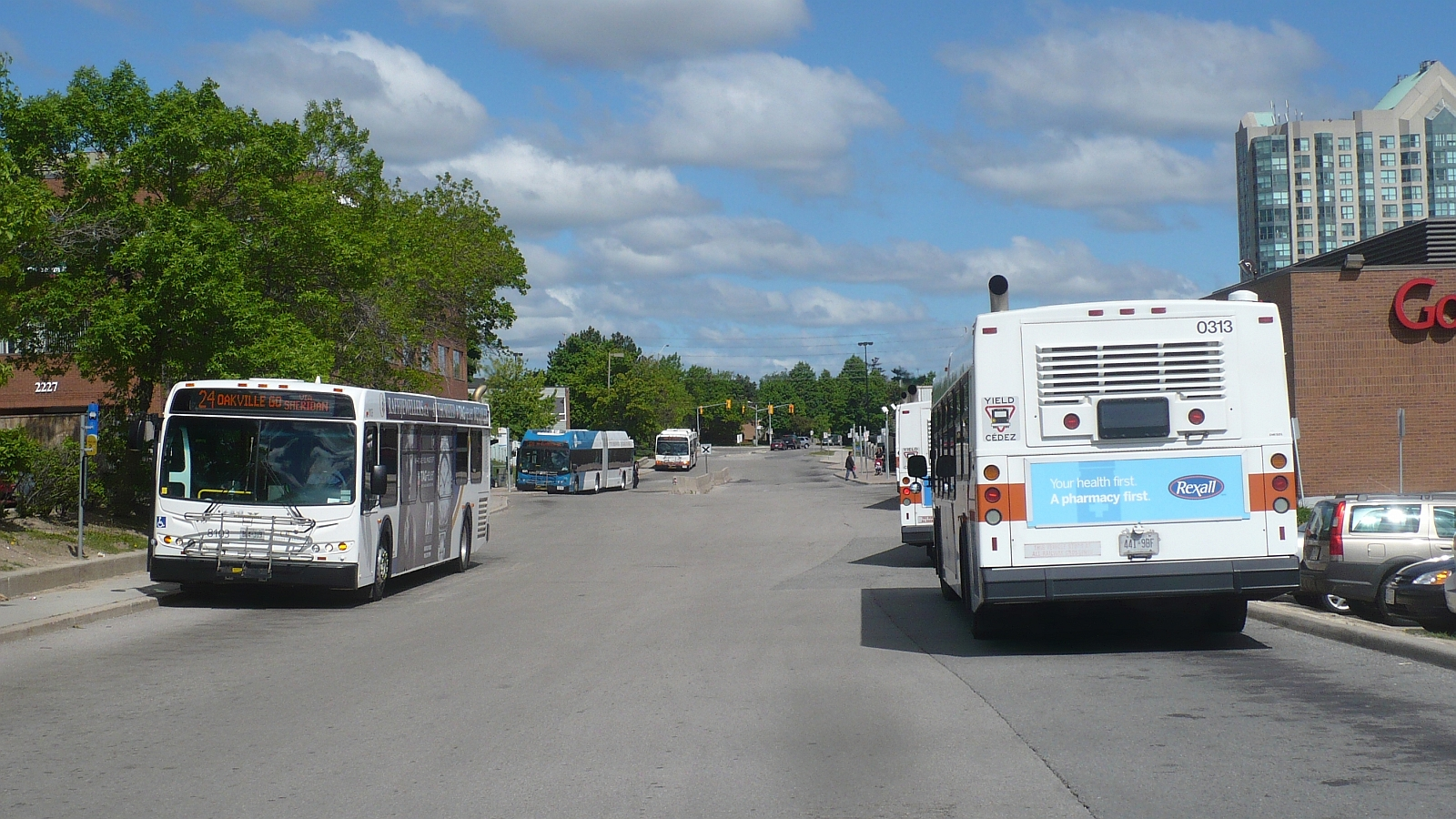

General information
- Location: 2150 Burnhamthorpe Road West; Mississauga, Ontario
- Coordinates: 43°32′36″N 79°41′02″W
- Owner: City of Mississauga
- Bus stands: 11
- Bus operators: MiWay

Construction
- Structure type: Transit mall
Location

South Common Centre is a MiWay bus terminal located in western Mississauga, Ontario, Canada. It is situated on the western side of the shopping centre of the same name.

The terminal does not contain a building, partly due to having direct connection to the mall and to the nearby buildings such as South Common Library. Instead, it is formatted as a transit mall, with benches and bus shelters on either side of the terminal.

The terminal, along with Erin Mills Town Centre, could possibly be relocated to Erin Mills station of the Mississauga Transitway, for more connectivity with other routes that are planned to serve the station.

== Bus routes ==
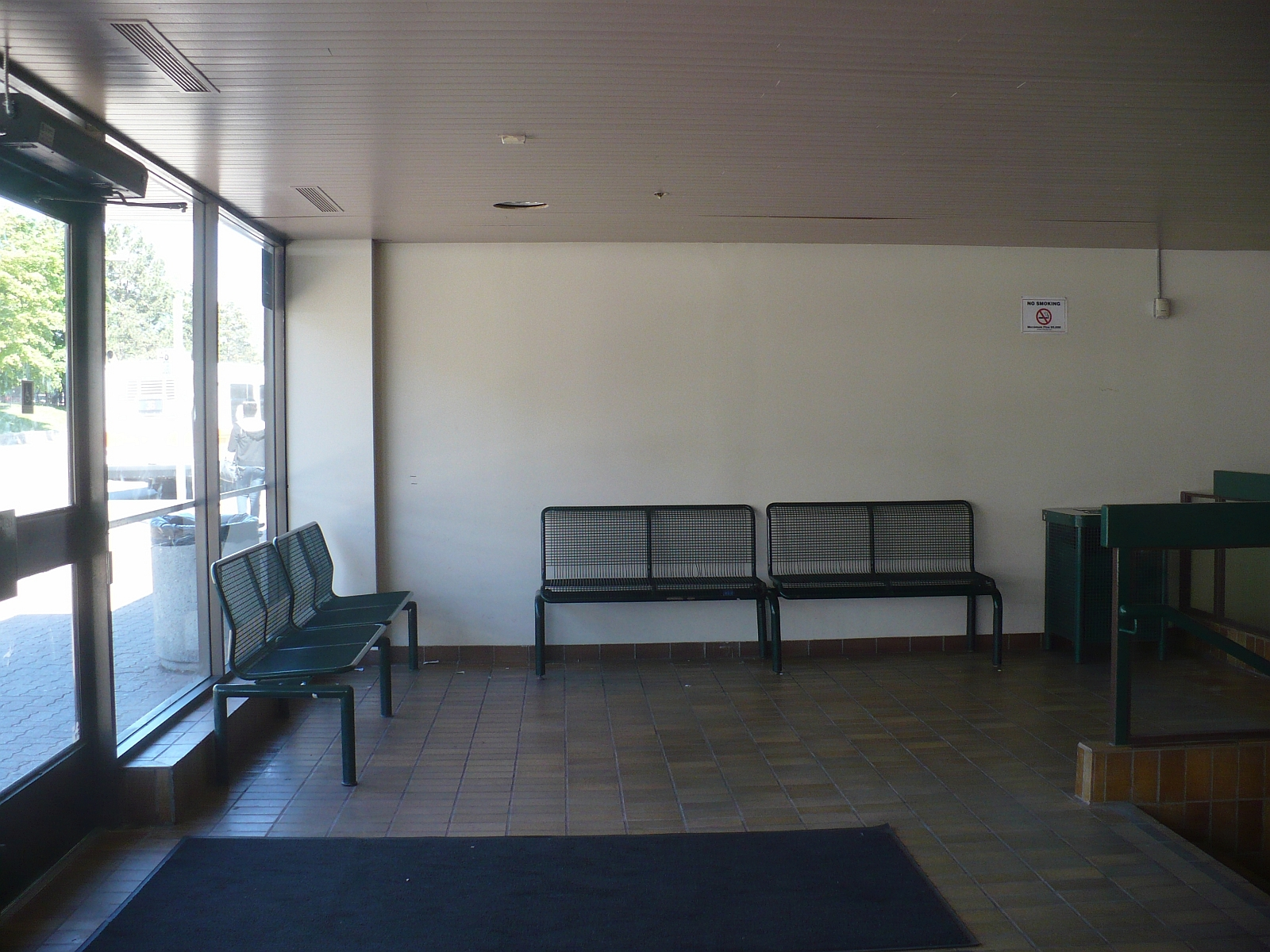
A waiting area is located inside the entrance to South Common Centre.

Bus service within the terminal itself is by MiWay.

=== MiWay ===
All routes are wheelchair-accessible.

Route		Destination
13	Glen Erin	Meadowvale Town Centre to Clarkson GO Station
26	Burnhamthorpe	Kipling Bus Terminal via City Centre (Weekends Only) and Islington Subway Station
29	Park Royal	Clarkson GO Station
36	Ridgeway	Winston Churchill Station
48	Erin Mills	Meadowvale Town Centre to University of Toronto Mississauga
110	University Express	City Centre to Clarkson GO Station via University of Toronto Mississauga
