= Dollarama =

Canadian dollar store retail chain

Dollarama Inc.
- Type: Public
- Traded as: TSX: DOL; S&P/TSX 60 component
- Industry: Retail
- Founded: 1992; 34 years ago
- Founder: Larry Rossy
- Headquarters: Mount Royal, Quebec
- Number of locations: Dollarama: 1684 (2025); Dollarcity: 632 (2024); The Reject Shop: 393 (2025)
- Key people: Neil Rossy, CEO
- Products: Cleaning supplies, toys, candy, grocery, gifts, healthcare products, kitchenware, stationery, party supplies, hardware
- Revenue: ▲$5.052 billion CAD (2023)
- Operating income: ▲$1.523 billion CAD (2023)
- Net income: ▲$1.191 billion CAD (2023)
- Number of employees: Around 28,000 (2024, Dollarama only)
- Subsidiaries: The Reject Shop; Dollarcity
- Website: dollarama.com

Dollarama Inc. is a Canadian dollar store retail chain headquartered in Mount Royal, Quebec. The business was established in 1992 by Larry Rossy. Since 2009, Dollarama has been Canada's largest retailer of items for five dollars or less. It has over 1400 stores across all provinces of Canada and the Northwest Territories; Ontario has the most stores. The company also owns The Reject Shop, an Australian discount variety store chain, and is the majority owner of Latin American dollar store chain, Dollarcity.

== History ==
=== Rossy ===
The first all-dollar store was founded in Montreal in 1910 by Salim Rassy, a Lebanese immigrant, whose name became Rossy. His son George took over the retailer in 1937 and led the company until his death in 1973 when grandson Larry Rossy assumed leadership of it when it had 20 stores. The discount retailer grew to 44 stores by 1992 which until then operated under the corporate name S.Rossy Inc. but traded simply as Rossy (not to be confused with Rossy Michael Ltd., a similar chain founded in 1949 by another son of Salim Rassy).

=== Dollarama ===
In 1992, Larry Rossy opened the first Dollarama at the shopping center "Les Promenades du St-Laurent" in Matane. The Dollarama division rapidly overtook S.Rossy as the primary source of revenue for the Rossy family. Locations of S.Rossy were rare after 1997 and the chain quietly disappeared by the turn of the new millennium with all of its stores either closed outright or converted into Dollarama branches. After converting all locations to the dollar store concept, Larry Rossy continued to open new stores eventually reaching 1,000 stores in 2015.

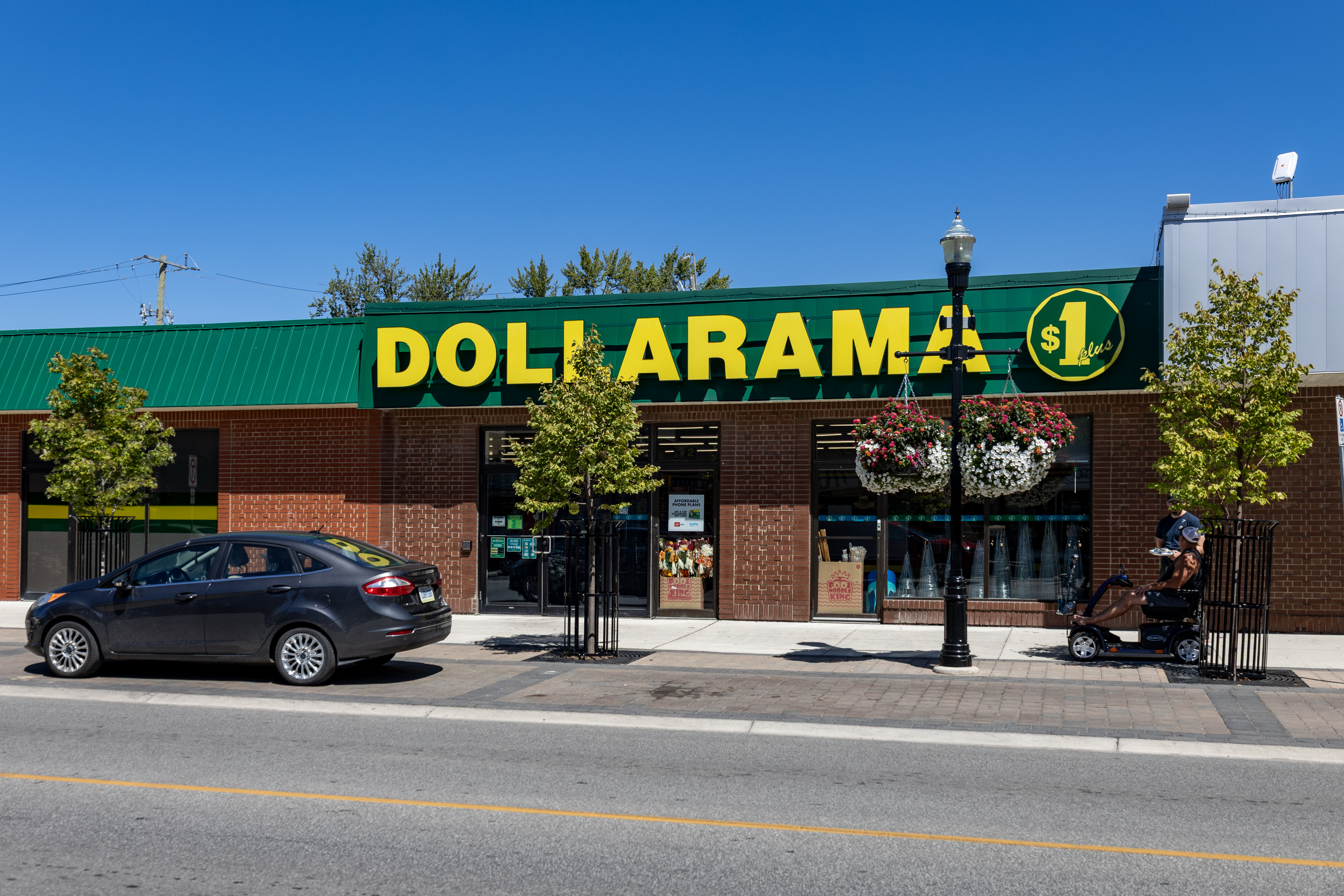
Dollarama store in Essex, Ontario

In November 2004, 80 percent of the chain was sold to a private equity fund Bain Capital for US$850 million. Dollarama's initial public offering took place on 9 October 2009. In 2016, Dollarama established a partnership with the Marco G. R. Enterprise, resulting in the sponsorship of the first edition of the Formula Windsor Championship. In 2018, Dollarama recalled over 50,000 children's toys due to dangerous levels of phthalates.

The number of stores in October 2021 was 539 in Ontario, 379 in Québec, 134 in Alberta, 111 in British Columbia, 42 in New Brunswick, 41 in Manitoba, 40 in Nova Scotia, 40 in Saskatchewan, 25 in Newfoundland and Labrador, and 5 in Prince Edward Island. There is also a Dollarama location in the Northwest Territories The company announced that it would open 700 new locations across Canada (including a few replacements for some of the Great Canadian Dollar Store locations) in the aforementioned provinces as well as their first store in the Yukon Territory.

=== Dollarcity ===
In 2013, Dollarama signed an eight-year agreement to share its business expertise and provide sourcing services to Dollarcity, a 15-outlet dollar store chain in El Salvador and Guatemala. By March 2019, Dollarcity had grown to 180 stores (44 in El Salvador, 54 in Guatemala and 82 in Colombia). In July 2019, Dollarama acquired a 50.1 percent stake in Dollarcity. Dollarcity expanded to Peru in 2021. Dollarama purchased an additional 10 percent stake in Dollarcity in 2024, bringing its total ownership to 60.1 percent. Dollarcity expanded into Mexico in 2025 through a new entity called Inversiones Comerciales Mexicanas (ICM) which is 80 percent owned by Dollarama. As of 31 December 2024, there were 632 Dollarcity stores.

=== The Reject Shop ===
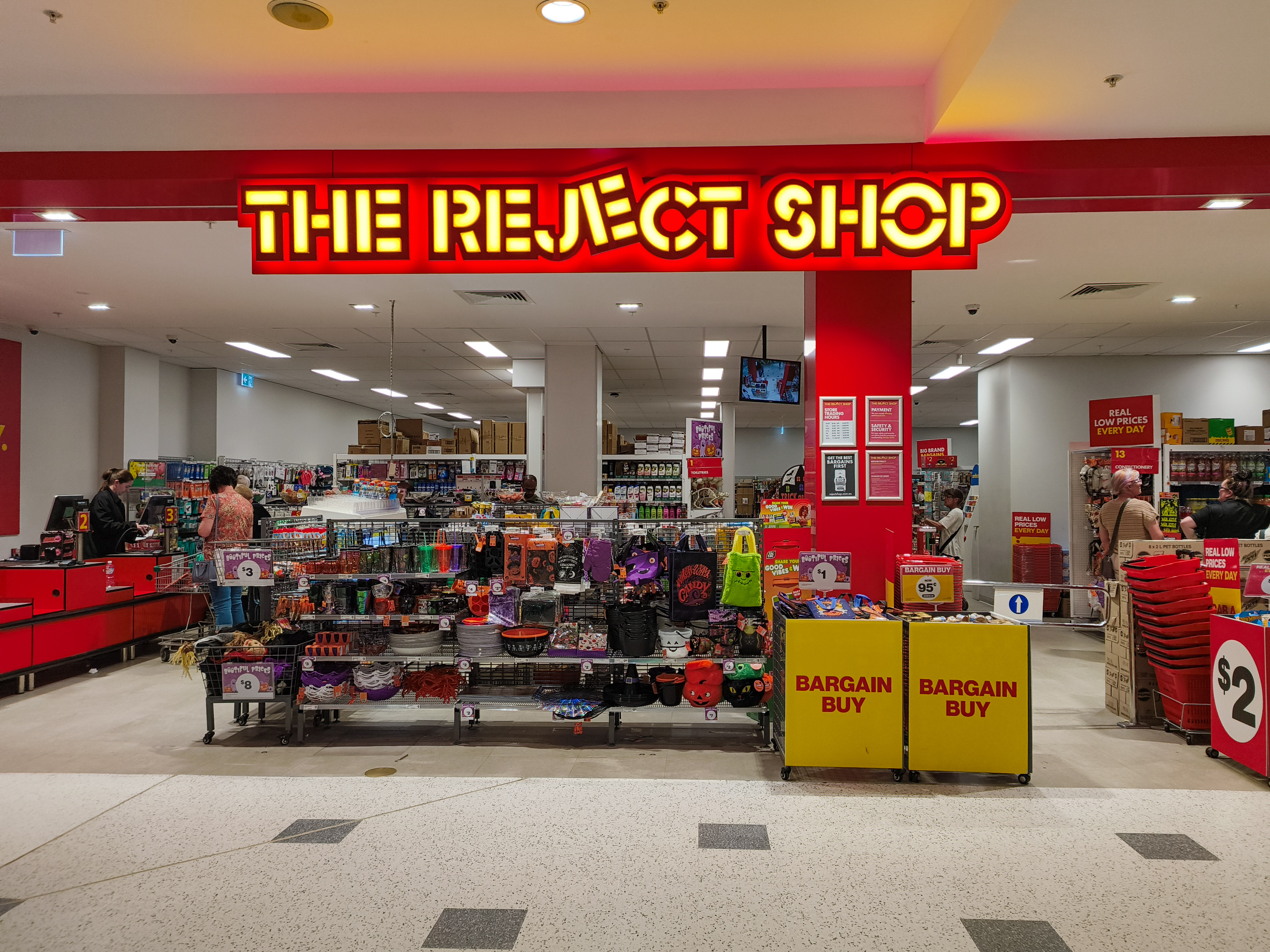
The Reject Shop store in Hillarys, Western Australia

On 26 March 2025, Dollarama announced they would be acquiring Australian discount retailer The Reject Shop for CA$233 million (A$259 million). The investor presentation said it will deliver a “dollarama shopping experience” with a new store layout, design and merchandising experience. The Reject Shop stores would be rebadged as Dollarama.

== Business practices ==
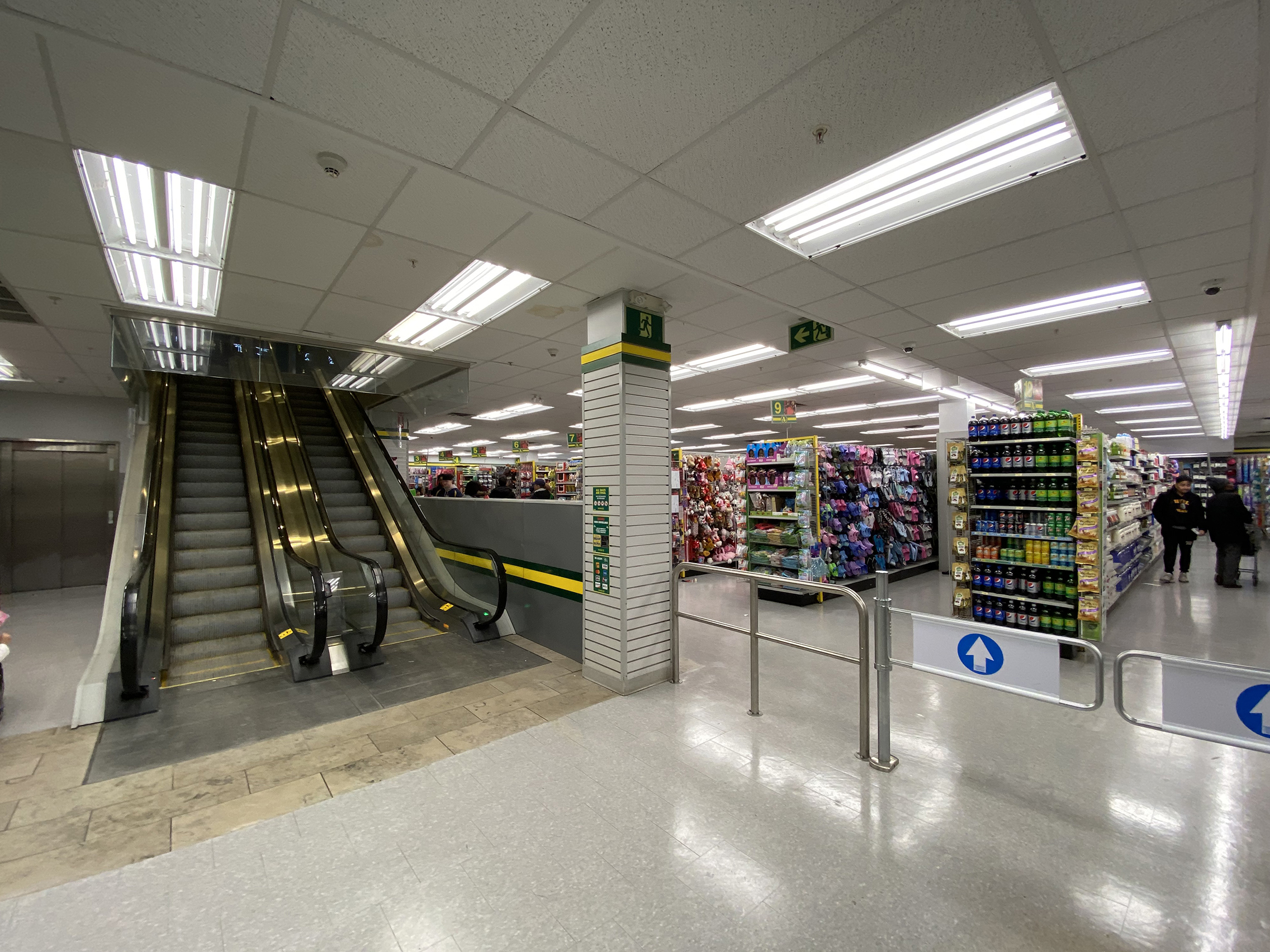
Dollarama in Square One, Mississauga, Ontario

Many items are priced at $1.00 or less, and initially almost all items were priced as such. In early 2009, Dollarama began to introduce items priced up to $2.00 (including $1.25 and $1.50 price points). The stores introduced items at $2.50 and $3.00 in August 2012. It again increased price points to include $3.50 and $4.00 items in August 2016. In 2022, Dollarama announced that its maximum price point would be increasing to $5.00. This price level increase allowed the chain to acquire products from a greater variety of sources, including closeout sales. Adjustments may eventually happen to all prices. Dollarama has always had a No Return and No Exchange Policy, stating an item cannot be given back to the store once a purchase is complete.

Payment in Dollarama stores was once by cash only, until Interac debit cards were added as a payment option beginning in 2008. Gift cards began to be offered in 2011. As of 2015, all Dollarama stores also support contact-less Interac Flash payments. In March 2017, Dollarama announced that credit cards would be offered as a payment option at all stores by the end of summer 2018.

Many Dollarama stores were opened in place of former locations of the now defunct BiWay, which closed after a series of dubious financial transactions involving a new owner of the parent operation. Dollarama launched its online store on 21 January 2019 where it will sell many of its products in bulk. Only 1000 of the roughly 4000 products offered in Dollarama stores will be sold online, namely items that are easily purchased in bulk.

== See also ==
- A Buck or Two
- Dollar Tree
- Great Canadian Dollar Store
- Your Dollar Store with More
