= Westwood Square Mall =

Shopping mall in Mississauga, Ontario, Canada

Westwood Square
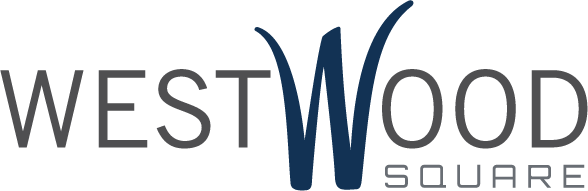
- Location: Mississauga, Ontario, Canada
- Coordinates: 43.719°N 79.638°W
- Address: 7205 Goreway Drive
- Opened: 1968-2014 (Westwood Mall) 2014-present (Westwood Square)
- Developer: Fieldgate Commercial Properties Ltd.
- Manager: Fieldgate Commercial Properties Ltd.
- Owner: Fieldgate Commercial Properties Ltd.
- Num. of stores: 80 plus
- Num. of anchor tenants: 2
- Floor area: 425,000 sq ft (39,484 m^{2})
- Floors: 1-2
- Public transit: MiWay
- Website: www.westwoodsquare.ca

Westwood Square is a shopping centre located in the Malton neighbourhood of Mississauga, Ontario. The mall is located on Goreway Drive between Etude and Morning Star Drive, approximately 1.25 km west of Highway 427. The mall is 425,000 sq ft (39,484 m^{2}). The north side of the mall hosts a 64,000 sq ft (5,946 m^{2}) transit terminal with 15 operational platforms servicing the cities of Brampton, Mississauga, and Toronto.

== History ==
Westwood Square was opened in December 1968, one of Mississauga's earliest enclosed malls. The intention was to build a small area for residents to shop, the mall started to renovate and expand. In the late 1980s, Westwood Square opened the first food court, hosting several vendors such as Subway and Tim Horton's along with various restaurants serving food from other cultures. Major retailer Zellers opened in the late 80's along with the food court; however, only a decade later, Zellers was closed down and replaced with Bi-way. Many retailers were replaced through Westwood Square's history; Into Fashion replaced Society, Fine Furniture replaced Bi-way and Price Choppers was replaced with FreshCo in 2010.

In 2013, one of the parking lots on the west side of the building was removed and replaced with a retail store. The former area of the mall that hosted Zellers, was renovated for new washrooms, retail space, and a brand new food court. Many stores were introduced since then.

== Westwood Square bus terminal ==
On the northwest side of the mall is a terminal servicing routes from MiWay, Brampton Transit, and the Toronto Transit Commission. The 64,000 sq ft (5,946 m^{2}) terminal contains 13 platforms in operation. All platforms and the buses that service Westwood Mall are wheelchair accessible with ramps, kneeling buses, and external announcements on buses.

=== MiWay - Local ===
Route		Direction	Destination	Destination	Destination	Westwood Mall Platform
7	Airport	SB	Pearson Airport Terminal 1	Renforth Station	City Centre Transit Terminal (Square One)	C
11	Westwood	SB	Woodbine Centre	Cloverdale Mall	Kipling Subway Station	B
15	Drew	WB	Tomken/Derry			A
16	Malton	CCW	Goreway/Nashua			D
16A	Malton	CW	Goreway/Nashua			D
18	Derry	WB	Malton GO Station	Sheridan College Brampton Davis Campus		H
22	Finch	EB	Humber Polytechnic	Etobicoke General Hospital		F
24	Northwest	SB	Viscount Terminal Link station	Renforth station		A
30	Rexdale	EB	Malton GO Station	Woodbine Centre	Islington Ave & Rexdale Blvd	E
42	Derry	WB	Malton GO Station	Meadowvale Town Centre		H

=== MiWay - Express ===
Route		Direction	Destination	Destination	Destination	Westwood Mall Platform
107	Malton Express	NB	Humber Polytechnic			I
107	Malton Express	SB	Viscount Terminal Link station	Renforth station	City Centre Transit Terminal (Square One) via Mississauga Transitway	G

=== Brampton Transit ===
Route		Direction	Destination	Destination	Westwood Mall Platform
5	Bovaird	WB	Trinity Common Terminal	Mount Pleasant GO Station	South of Platform H
14/14A	Torbram	NB	Malton GO Station	Countryside Drive	South of Platform H
30	Airport Road	NB	Mayfield Road	AMB Distribution Centre (Limited service)	South of Platform H

=== TTC ===
Route		Direction	Destination	Westwood Mall Platform
52B	Lawrence West^{‡}	EB	Lawrence Subway Station	South of Platform I

‡ Operates weekdays only.
