= City Centre Transit Terminal =

Transit terminal in Mississauga, Canada

City Centre
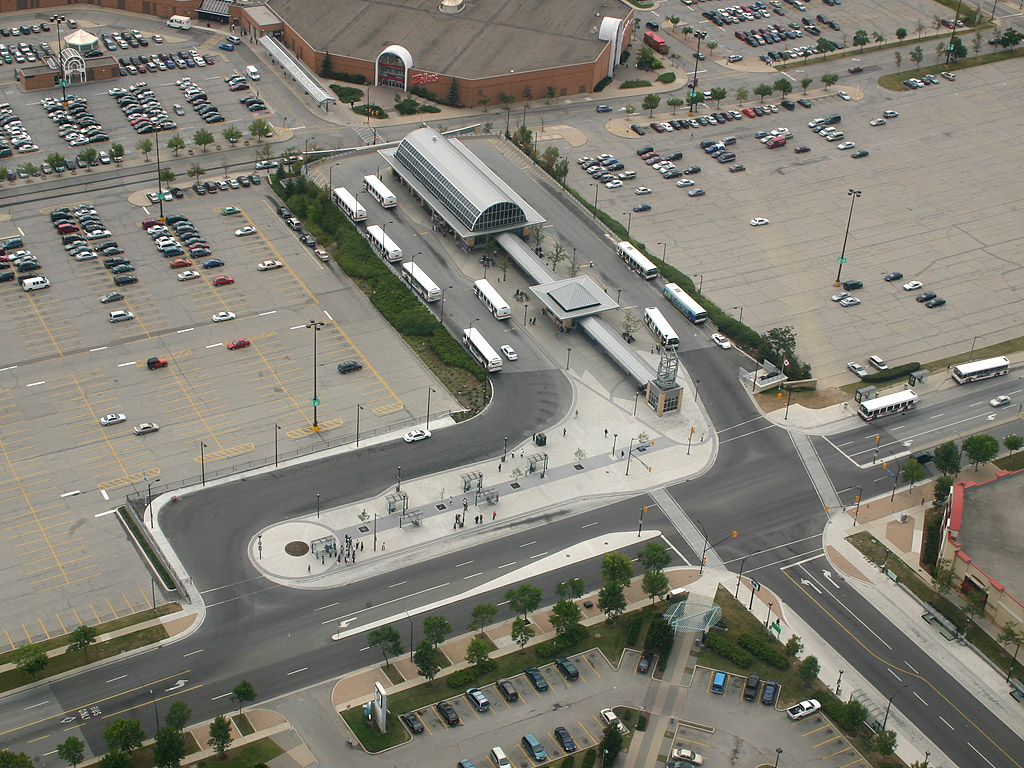
- Aerial overview, showing Square One to the south (top) and the GO Transit terminal to the north (bottom-right)

General information
- Location: 200 Rathburn Road West, Mississauga, Ontario, Canada
- Coordinates: 43°35′38″N 79°38′47.6″W
- Owner: City of Mississauga
- Platforms: 13
- Bus operators: MiWay; Züm (Brampton Transit)
- Connections: GO Transit at Square One Bus Terminal

Construction
- Platform levels: 2
- Cycle facilities: Bike racks
- Accessible: Yes

Other information
- Website: Official website

History
- Opened: Buses: November 1997; 29 years ago; Hurontario LRT: TBD

Services
Preceding station	Metrolinx	Following station
Erin Mills toward Winston Churchill	Mississauga Transitway	Central Parkway toward Renforth

Future services
Preceding station	Metrolinx	Following station
Eglinton toward Brampton Gateway	Hurontario LRT	Robert Speck toward Port Credit
Location

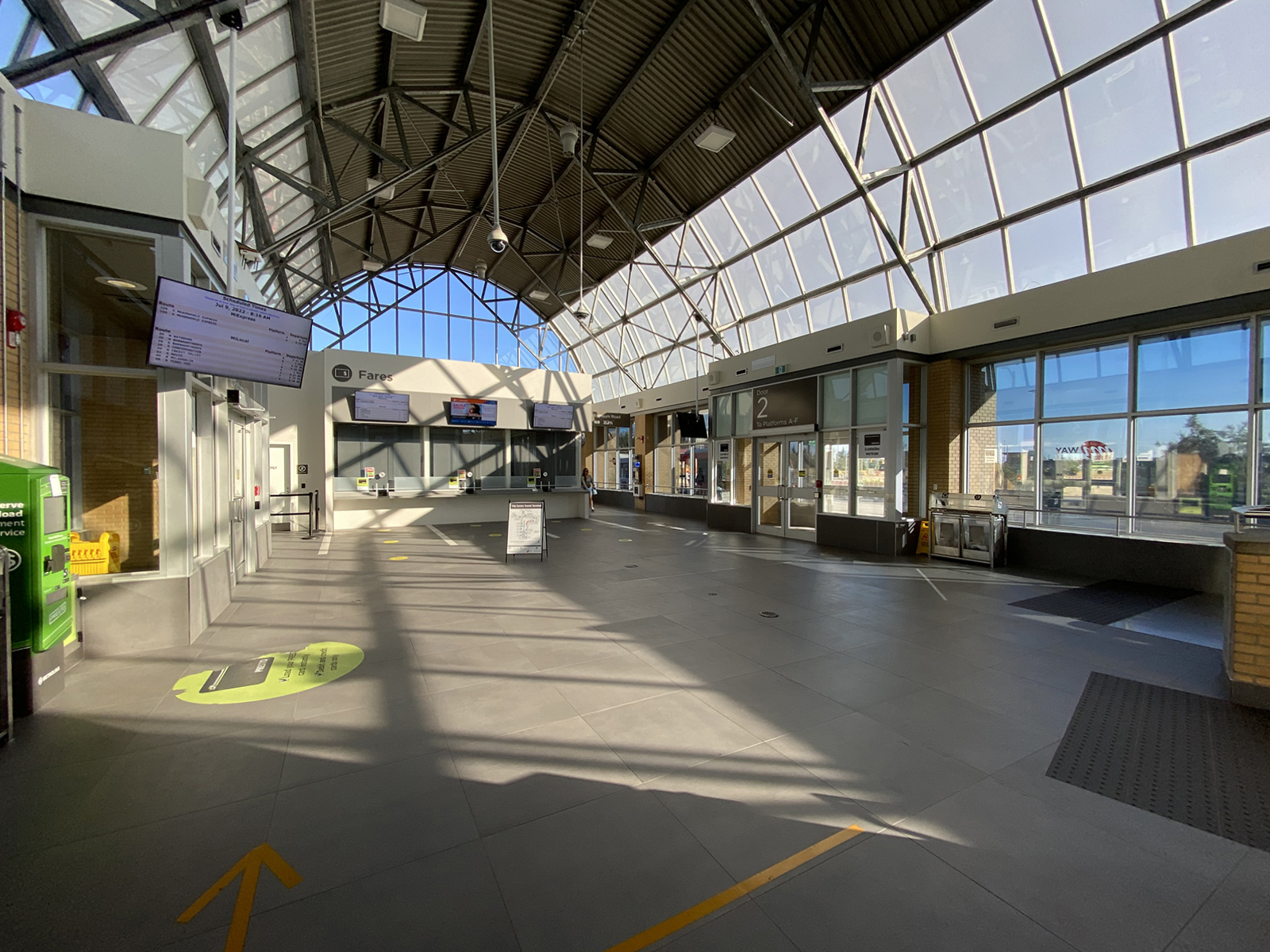
Interior of the terminal's main level

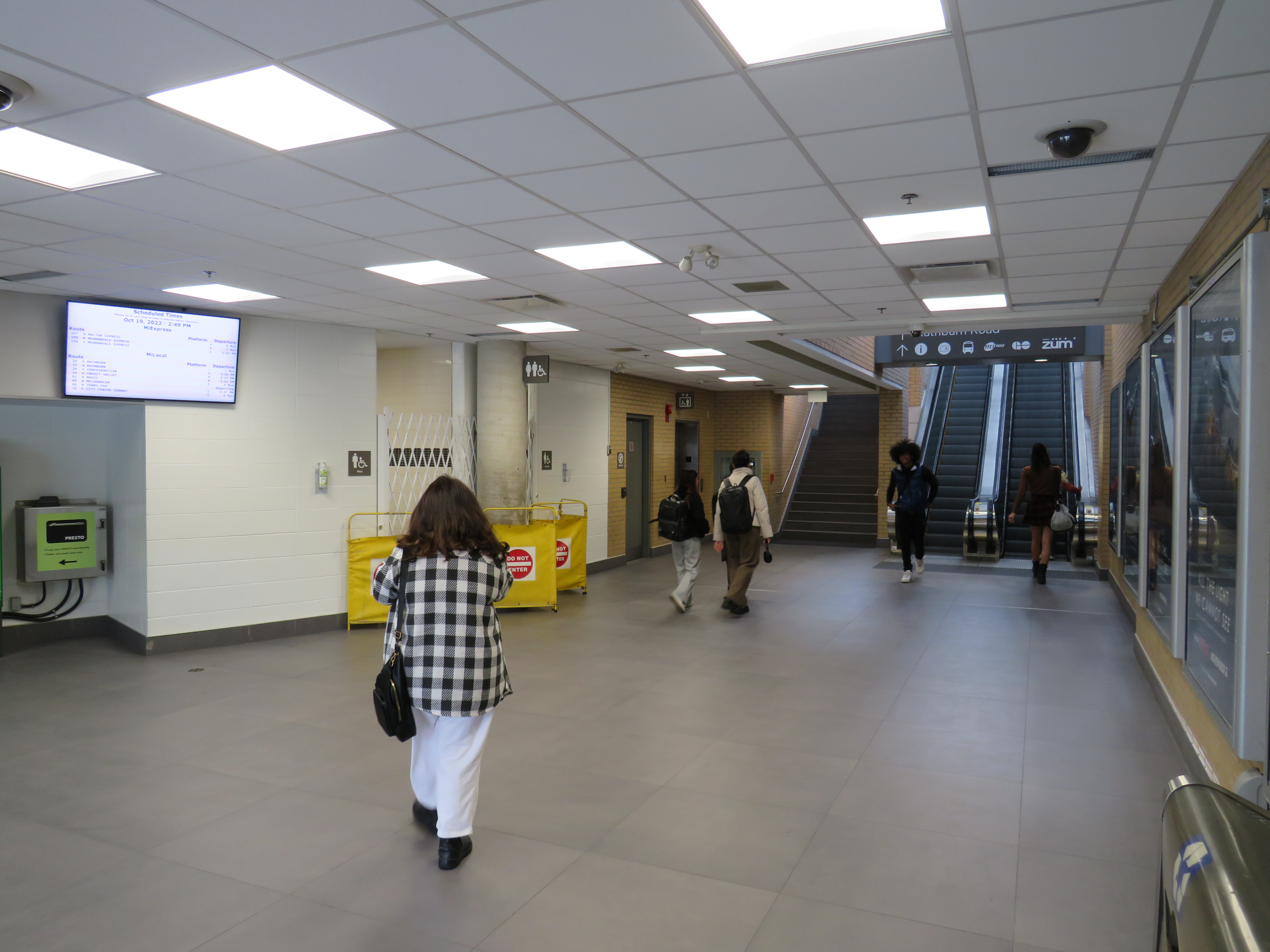
Lower level, at the entrance leading to and from Square One

The City Centre Transit Terminal (CCTT) in Mississauga, Ontario, Canada is the main transit hub and bus station for MiWay, the city's public transit system. The station is situated in Mississauga City Centre at the north side of Square One Shopping Centre. Prior to 2024, buses using the terminal displayed "Square One" on their destination signs.

Buses use the upper level, while access from the mall is through the lower level via a signalized crosswalk (no indoor connection), where a taxi stand and kiss and ride are located. Services provided on the upper level of the building include ticket sales, information booth, and lost and found, while washroom facilities and MiWay transit police holding cells are located on the lower level. The terminal is accessible by both elevator and escalator.

GO Transit's regional Square One Bus Terminal is located directly north, across Rathburn Road, on Station Gate Road.

== History ==
The terminal opened in November 1997, replacing an overcrowded loop on the southeast side of the mall. Seventy five percent of the cost of the $6.5 million project was covered by subsidies from the Ministry of Transportation of Ontario, with the balance of funds coming from the city's capital budget. Platforms were extended east along Rathburn Road in the mid to late 2000s.

In 2015, public washrooms were renovated.

In 2016, the bus terminal was closed except the building for repairs. Buses at that time had to be boarded along Rathburn Road.

== Bus routes ==
Along with MiWay buses, the terminal is served by one Brampton Transit Züm bus rapid transit route. All routes are wheelchair-accessible.

=== MiWay ===
Route		Destination
2	Hurontario	Port Credit GO Station
3	Bloor	Kipling Bus Terminal
6	Credit Woodlands	Westdale Mall
7	Airport	Westwood Square Mall via Renforth station
8	Cawthra	Port Credit GO Station
9	Rathburn	Churchill Meadows Community Centre via Erindale GO Station, Credit Valley Hospital, and Erin Mills Town Centre
10	Bristol	Meadowvale Town Centre
17	Hurontario	Hurontario & 407 Park and Ride
20	Rathburn	Kipling Bus Terminal
26	Burnhamthorpe	South Common Centre to Link to Kipling Bus Terminal via Islington subway station (weekends)
28	Confederation	Mississauga Hospital
61	Mavis	Sheridan College Brampton
66	McLaughlin	Sheridan College Brampton
68	Terry Fox	Bancroft Drive
107	Malton Express	Humber Polytechnic via Renforth station, Viscount Terminal Link station & Westwood Square Mall
109	Meadowvale Express	Meadowvale Town Centre to Kipling subway station
110	University Express	Clarkson GO Station via South Common Centre and University of Toronto Mississauga

=== Brampton Transit ===
Route		Destination
502	Züm Main	Northbound to Sandalwood Loop via Brampton Gateway Terminal

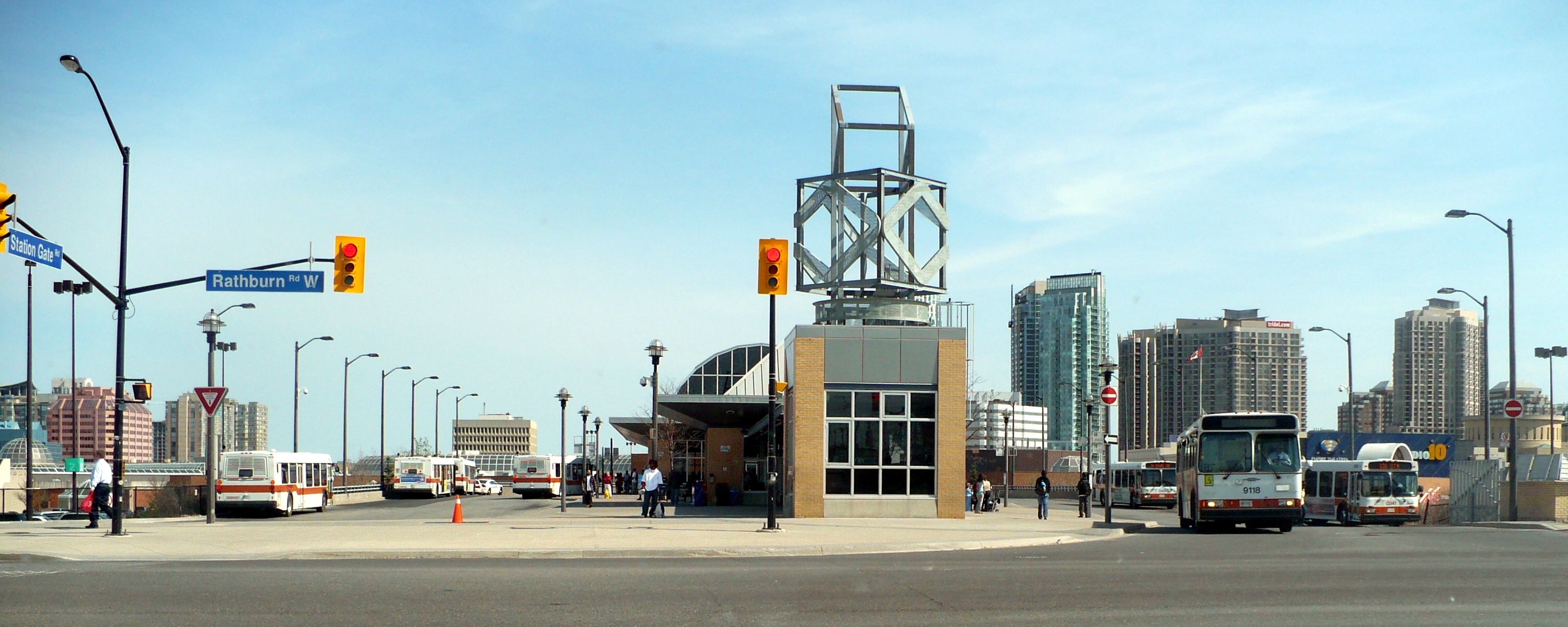
A view of Mississauga City Centre Transit Terminal from Station Gate Road.
