= Square One Shopping Centre =

Shopping mall in Mississauga, Ontario

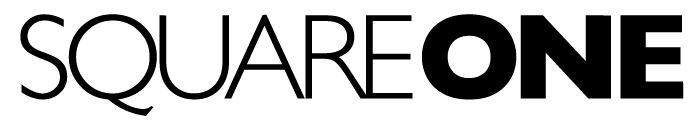

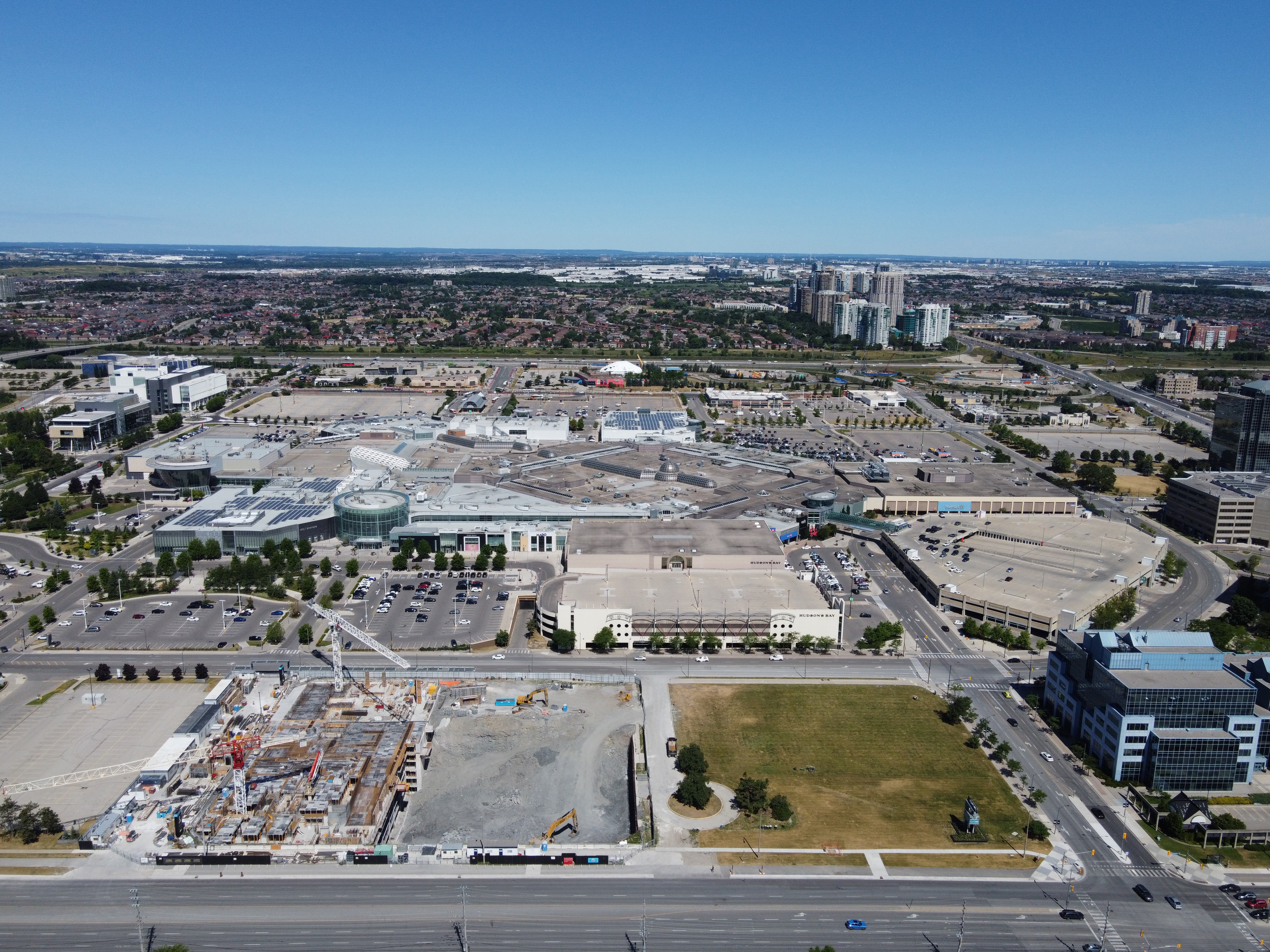
- Aerial view of Square One Shopping Centre (2022)

General information
- Status: Open
- Type: Shopping mall
- Location: 100 City Centre Drive; Mississauga, Ontario, Canada
- Coordinates: 43°35′35″N 79°38′34″W
- Opened: October 3, 1973; 53 years ago
- Owner: AIMCo; OMERS
- Operator: Oxford Properties

Technical details
- Floor count: 2
- Floor area: 200,000 square metres (2,200,000 sq ft) of gross leasable area

Other information
- Number of stores: 360+
- Number of anchors: 4
- Public transit: City Centre Transit Terminal; Square One Bus Terminal

Website
- shopsquareone.com

Square One Shopping Centre, or simply Square One, is a Canadian shopping mall located in the city centre of Mississauga, Ontario. It is the largest shopping centre in Ontario and the second largest shopping centre in Canada, after the West Edmonton Mall. It has over 2,200,000 square feet (200,000 m^{2}) of retail space, with more than 360 stores and services. On average, the mall serves over 24 million customers each year. It operates on most holidays (the exceptions being Good Friday, Easter Sunday and Christmas Day), making it the only shopping mall in the city and one of the few in the Greater Toronto Area that does so.

Square One is located in Mississauga City Centre adjacent to the interchange of Highway 403 and Hurontario Street, near the Mississauga Civic Centre, the Living Arts Centre, and the Mississauga Central Library; and has many condominium towers surrounding it. Located adjacent to the mall is the City Centre Transit Terminal; the central hub of MiWay; Mississauga's municipal transit system, Square One Bus Terminal (serving regional GO Transit buses), and a Peel Regional Police community station.

== History ==
Excavation of the Square One site began in 1969. Construction was finished in 1973, where the mall was first opened to the public. The four original anchors included Woolco, Sears at the time Simpson-Sears, The Bay, and Dominion.

Some stores such as Ashbrook's and Mark & Spencer's were closed in the late 1990s order to make way for the Cityside expansion, which was completed in the early 2000s. In 1999, Eaton's filed for bankruptcy, closing their location at Square One. Zellers took over the space in 2000.

During January 2011, Target acquired the leases of most Zellers stores, including their location at Square One. Zellers closed in June 2012 and the store was renovated into a Target, which opened to the public on March 30, 2013. In January 2013, Square One started a major renovation on the main corridor from the Target store to the centre court/food court. Burger King and Bowring were forced to close down due to the expansion of the food court across from the existing food court. The scenic elevator, along with the fountain, were removed and replaced with two escalators. This renovation was completed in Fall 2013. Square One also expanded by adding its concept, Grand Centre Court, which added at least (220,000 sq ft (20,439 m^{2})) square feet extra.

Sears Canada announced on June 14, 2013, that it would be closing its store at Square One and Yorkdale as of March 9, 2014. On June 27, Empire Theatres announced that they would be selling their theatre at Square One to Landmark Cinemas, which closed one year later.

It was announced on December 6, 2013, that La Maison Simons would take over most of the space occupied by Sears, with a flagship store which opened in Spring 2016.

In January 2015, Target Canada announced that it would close all their stores, including their location at Square One. Target's location at Square One closed in April 2015.

The South Expansion was completed on March 1, 2016, adding numerous retailers and a Holt Renfrew anchor store, along with removing the Dollarama and Home Outfitters stores.

In June 2018, Square One announced the West Expansion, which took place in the former Target location that closed in 2015. The expansion opened between Fall 2018 and Spring 2019 and added several brands like Uniqlo and The Rec Room, as well as a 34,000 sq. ft. local food emporium, The Food District. Retailer Uniqlo had opened a store in the mall on November 2, 2018.

== Future Hurontario LRT connection ==
The Hurontario LRT is a light rail line under construction that will run along Hurontario Street from Port Credit GO Station in the south to Brampton in the north. The LRT will have an intermediate stop at City Centre and connect to the MiWay City Centre Bus Terminal, as well as the Square One GO Bus Terminal.

== List of anchor stores ==
Name	No. of floors	Area	Year opened	Year closed	Notes
Ashbrook's				c. 1990	Currently part of Cityside Expansion
Dominion			1973	1986	Demolished and replaced with mall expansion
Eaton's			1988	1999	
HMV					
Holt Renfrew		130,000 square feet (12,000 m^{2})	2016	—N/a	
Hudson's Bay			1973	2025	
Marks & Spencer				c. 1990	
Sears		145,202 square feet (13,490 m^{2})	1973	2014	
Simons			2016	—N/a	Replaced part of Sears
Sport Chek			2016	—N/a	Replaced part of Sears
Target		163,733 square feet (15,211.3 m^{2})	2013	2015	Incorporated into mall space
Uniqlo			2018	—N/a	Replaced Target
Walmart			1994	—N/a	Replaced Woolco
Woolco			1973	1994	
Zellers			2000	2012	Replaced Eaton's

== Gallery ==
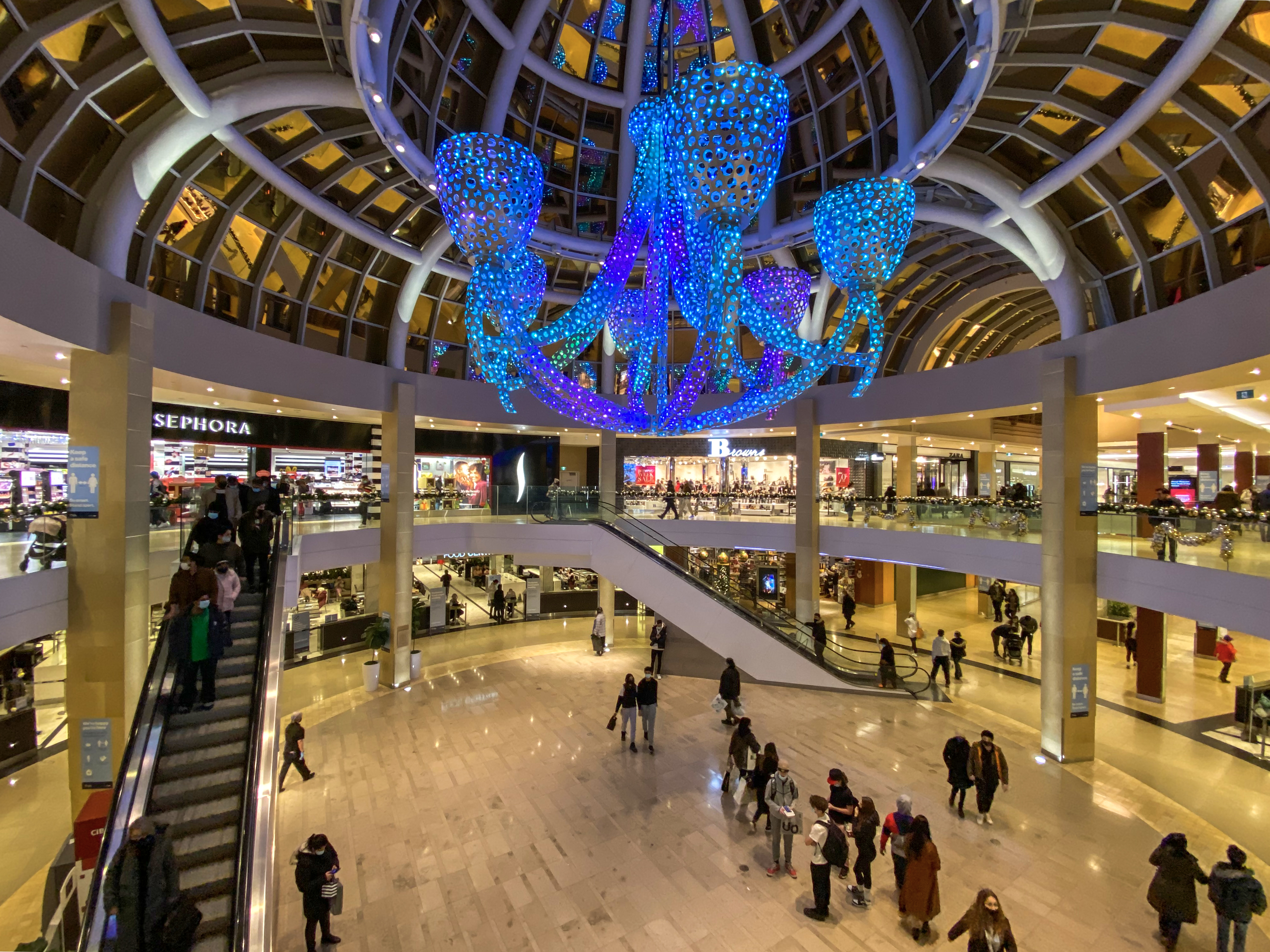
Square One Chandelier

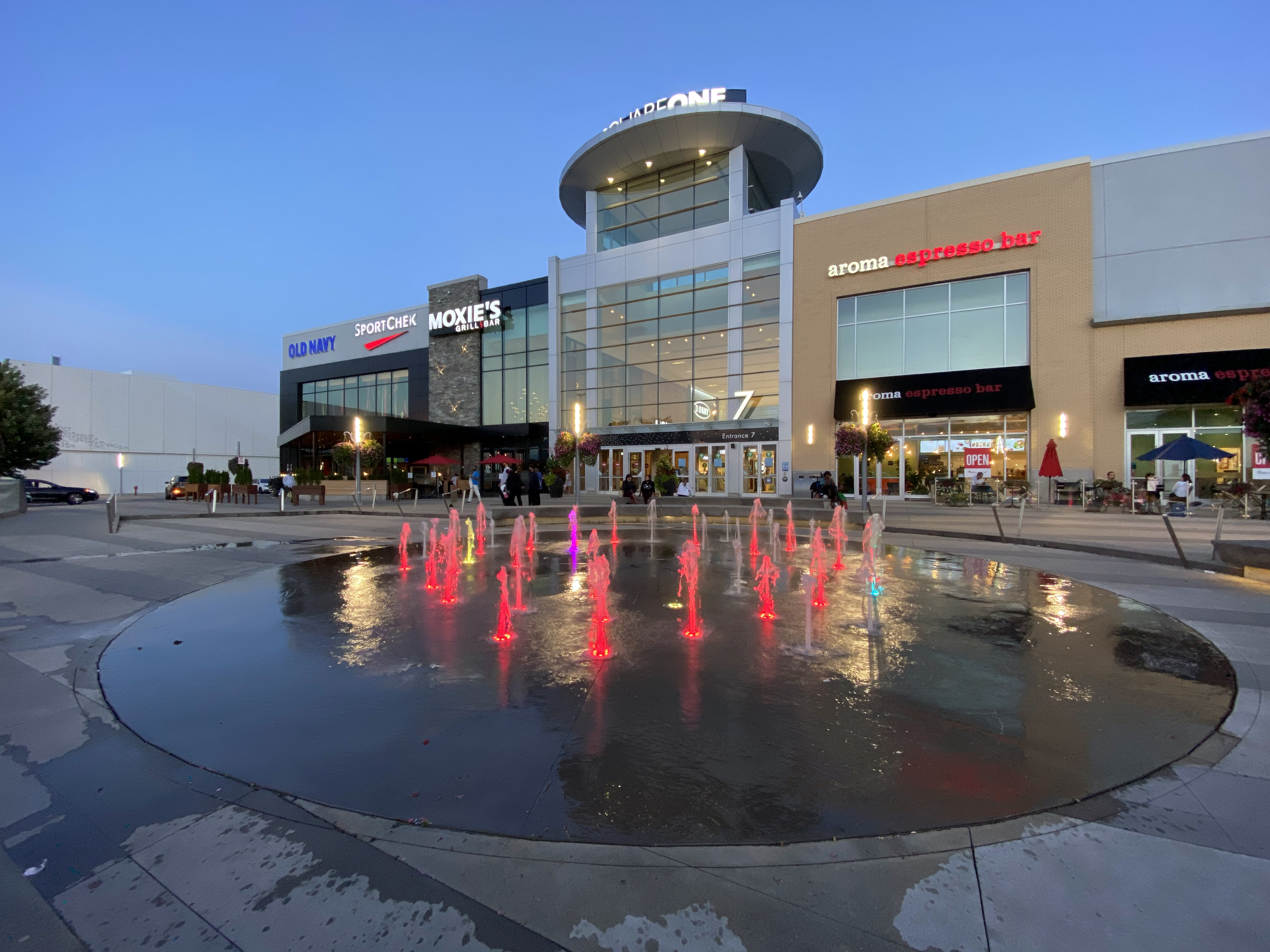
Square One Entrance 7

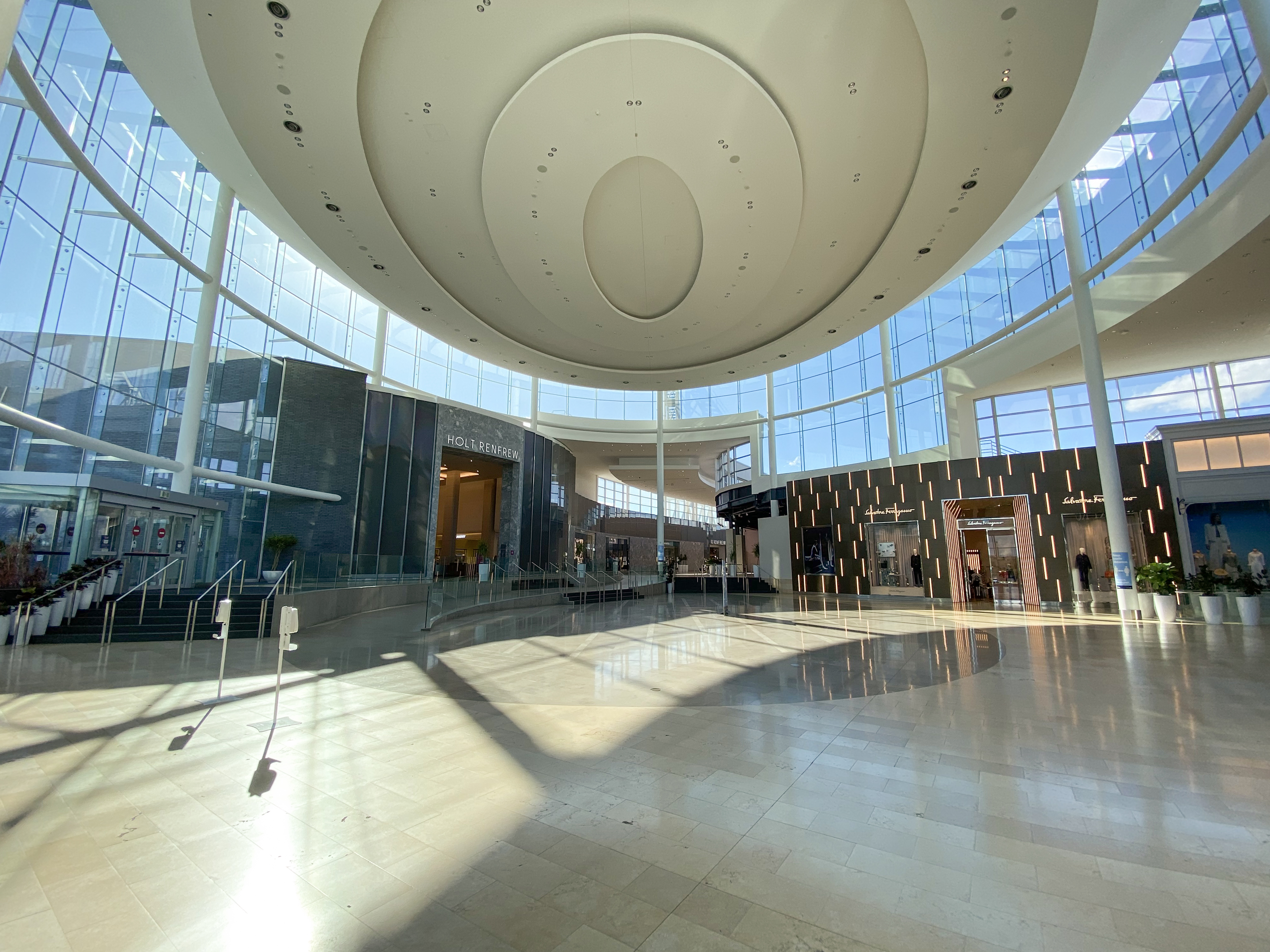
Entrance lobby.

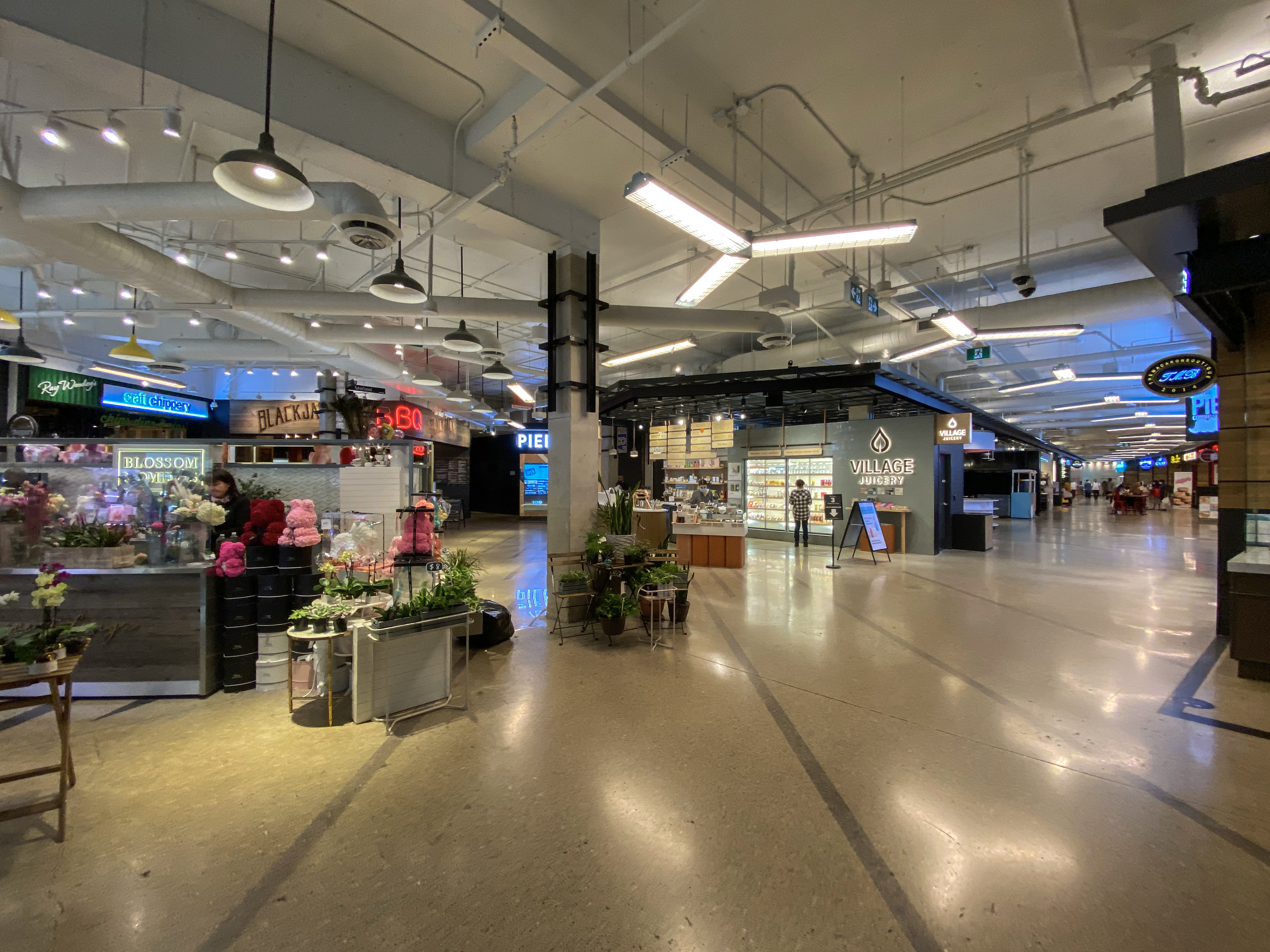
The Food District

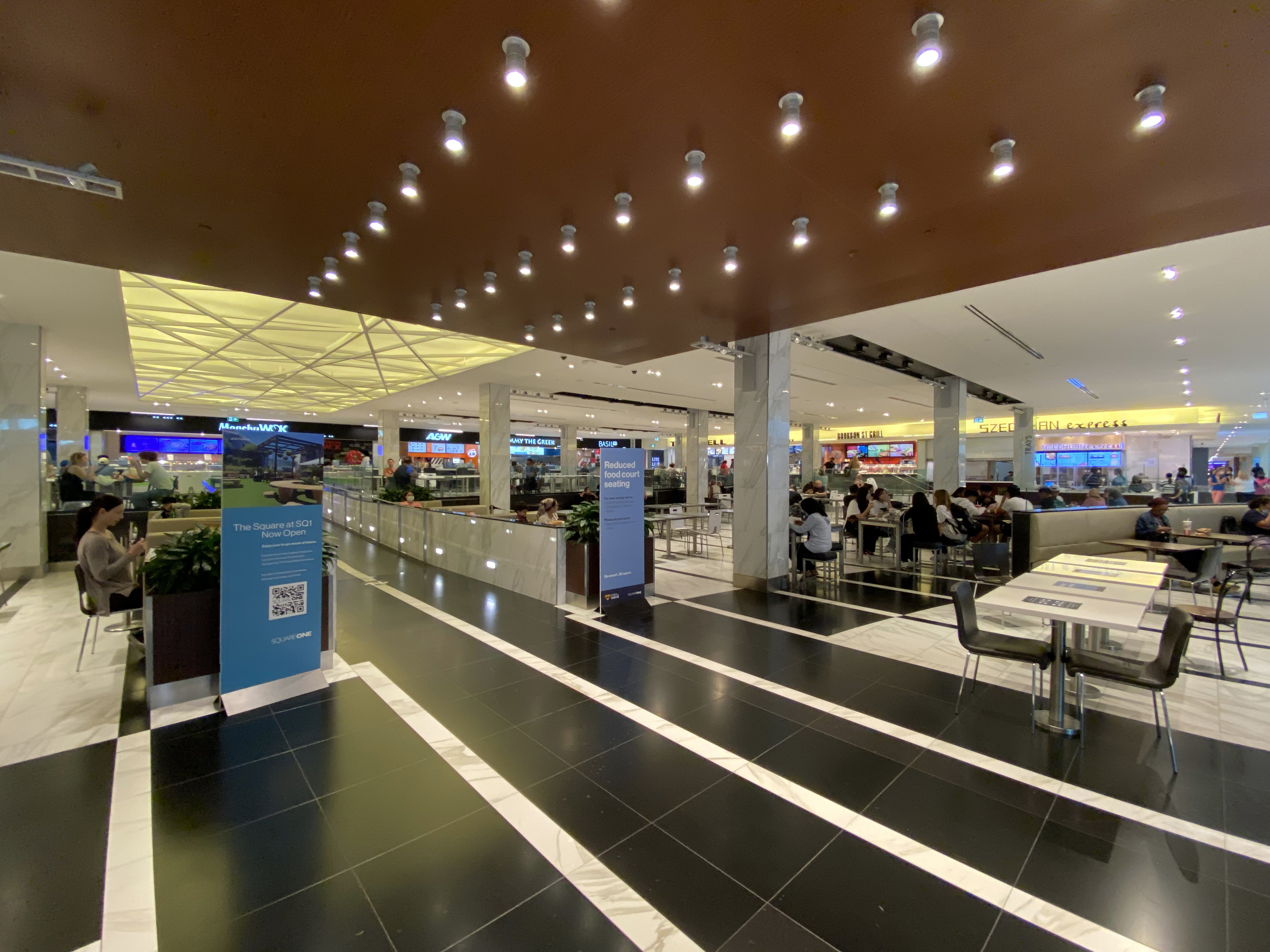
The Food Central, part of the South Expansion.

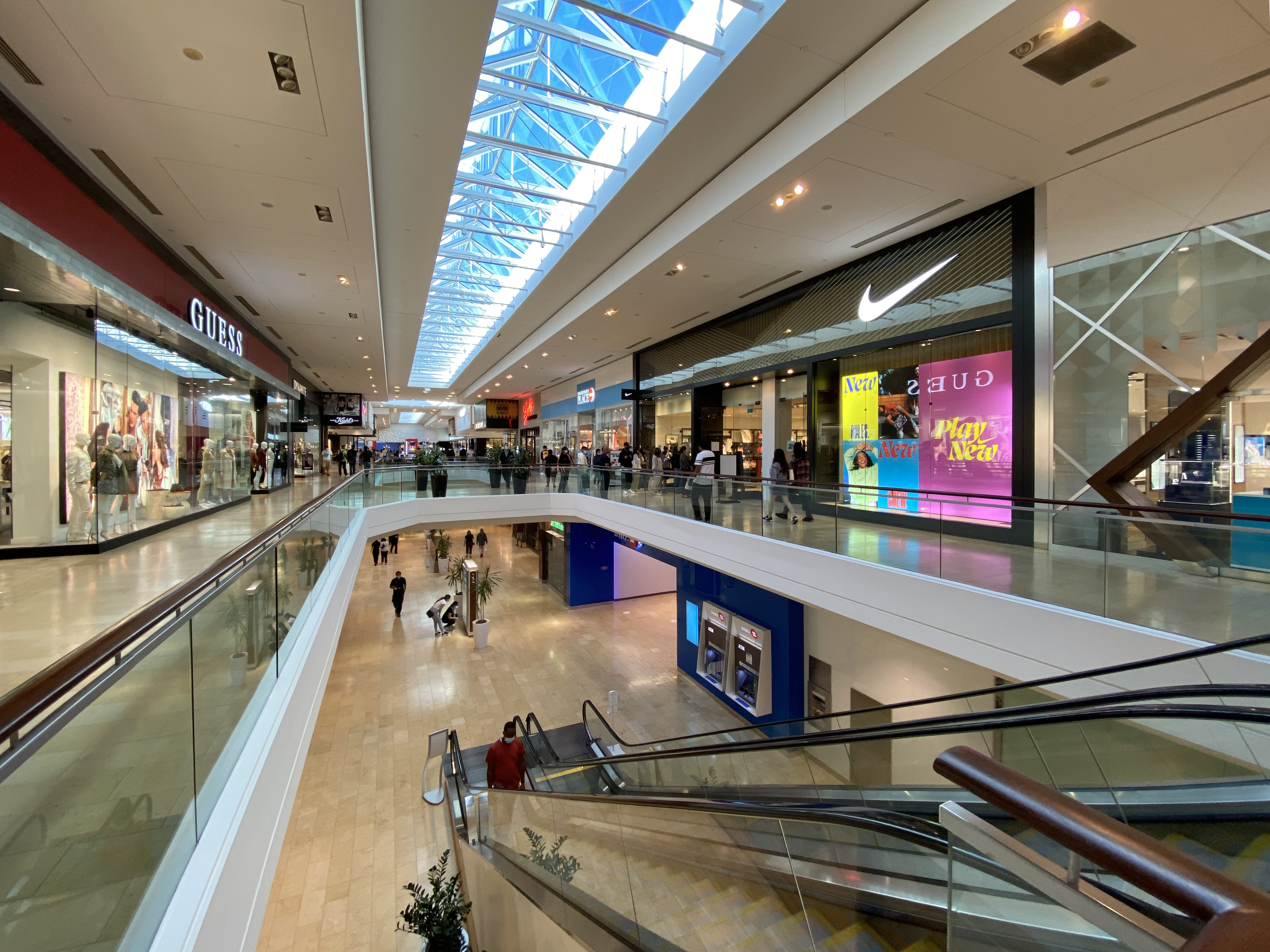
Shops

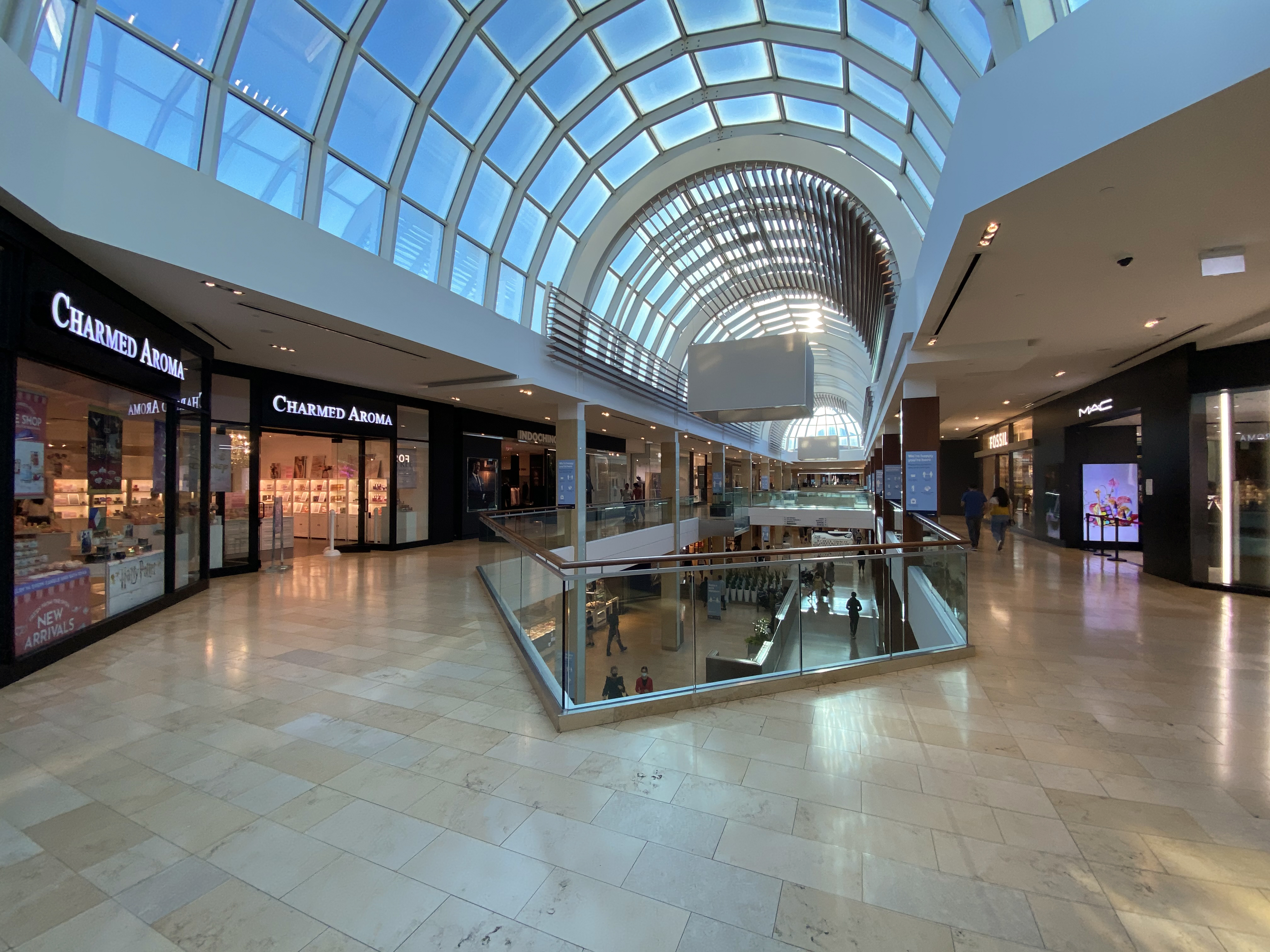
The mall level 2 shops

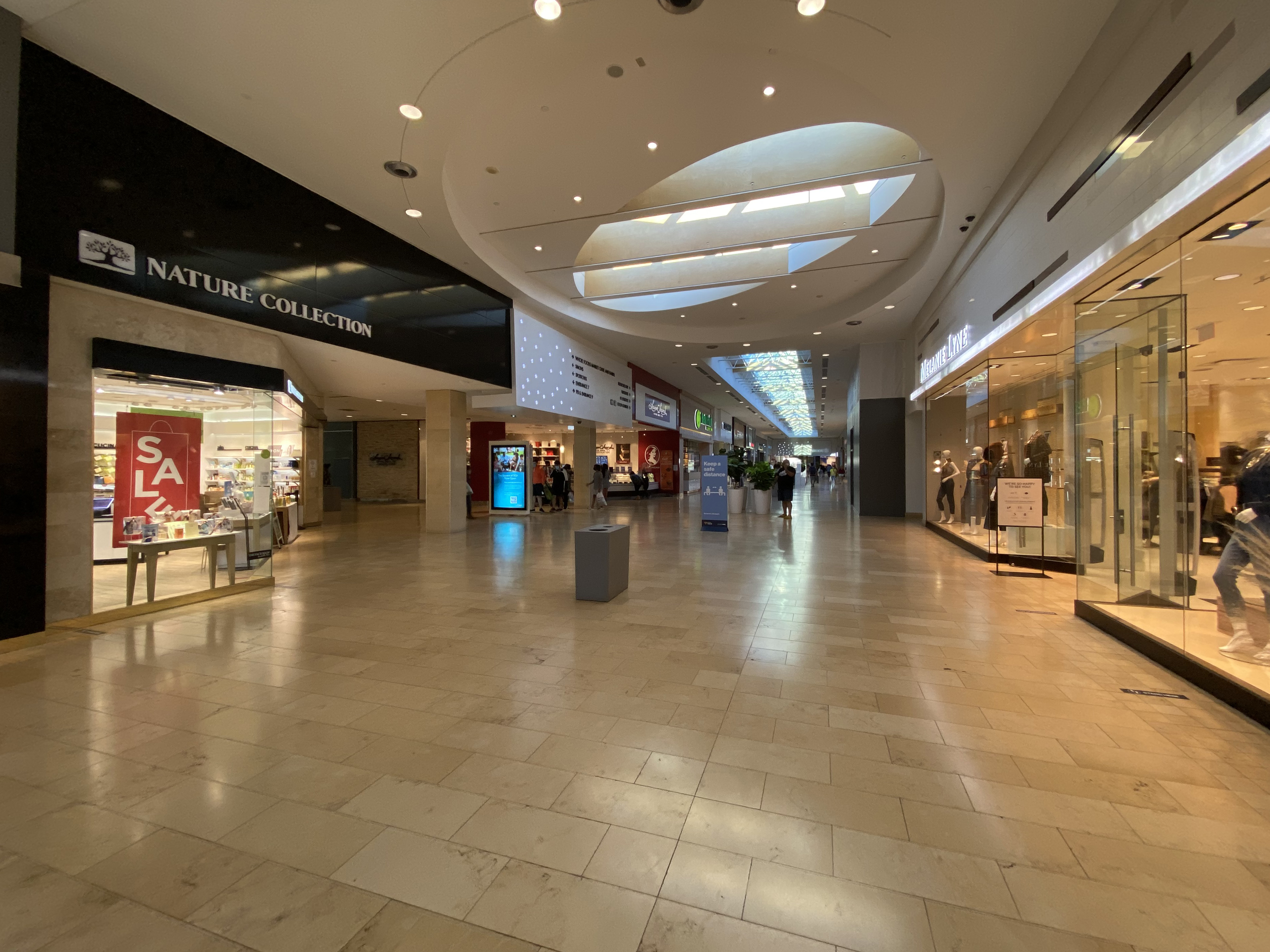
Square One Access

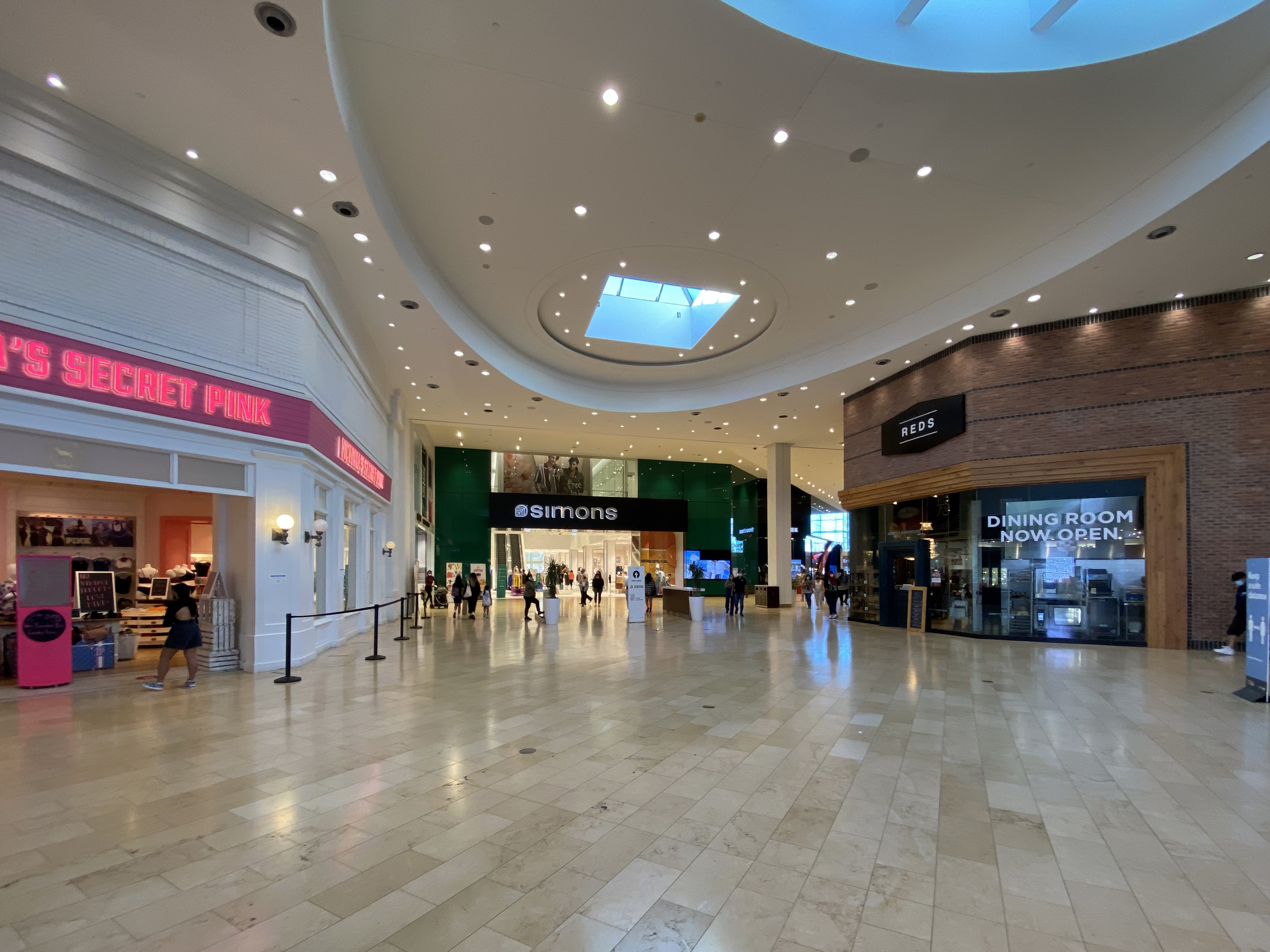
Square One Simons
