= Meadowvale Town Centre Transit Terminal =

Bus terminal in Mississauga, Canada

Meadowvale Town Centre
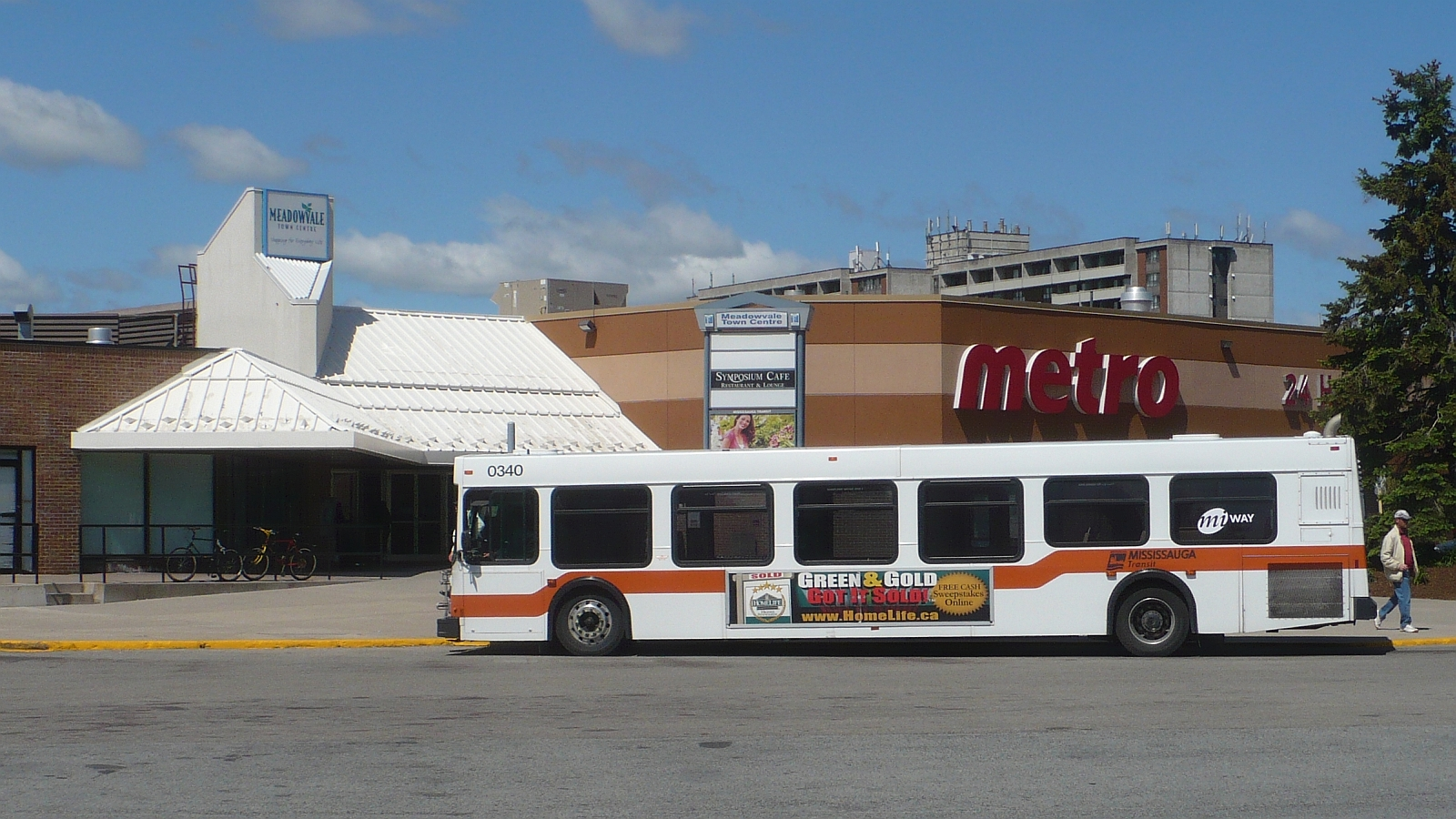

General information
- Location: 6677 Meadowvale Town Centre Circle, Mississauga ON
- Coordinates: 43°35′00″N 79°45′31″W
- Owner: City of Mississauga
- Bus stands: 10
- Bus operators: MiWay

Construction
- Structure type: bus loop
Location

The Meadowvale Town Centre Transit Terminal is the main, inter-regional transit hub for the community of Meadowvale located in northwestern Mississauga, Ontario, Canada. It is the third-largest terminal served by MiWay, the second-largest in Mississauga after City Centre Transit Terminal. It is situated on the eastern side of Meadowvale Town Centre, which is a community mall.

The terminal does not contain a building, partly due to the terminal being located directly beside the mall. Instead, it is composed of a big bus loop with benches and bus shelters surrounding it. MiWay buses lay over in the middle of the bus loop.

MiWay tickets and passes can be bought either at Shoppers Drug Mart, which is located within Meadowvale Town Centre; or at the Meadowvale Community Centre, located at the intersection of Glen Erin Drive and Aquitaine Avenue. The nearest GO Transit ticket agency for this terminal is at a branch of Rabba Fine Foods located at the intersection of Derry Road and Glen Erin Drive, just north of the Meadowvale Community Centre.

== Bus routes ==
Bus service within the terminal itself is exclusively by MiWay. However, GO Transit stops at the intersection of Aquitaine Avenue and Formentera Avenue, which requires a short walk from the bus loop.

All routes are wheelchair-accessible.

Route		Destination
10	Bristol	City Centre
13	Glen Erin	Clarkson GO Station via South Common Centre
38	Creditview	Cooksville GO Station
39	Britannia	Renforth station
42	Derry	Westwood Square Mall
43	Matheson	Renforth station
44	Mississauga Road	University of Toronto Mississauga
45	Winston Churchill	Clarkson GO Station
45A	Winston Churchill	Clarkson GO Station via Speakman Drive
46	Tenth Line	Erin Mills Station
48	Erin Mills	University of Toronto Mississauga via South Common Centre
90	Terragar-Copenhagen Loop	Terragar Boulevard to Copenhagen Road
109	Meadowvale Express	Kipling Bus Terminal via City Centre

== Connections ==
GO Transit buses stop at the intersection of Aquitaine Avenue and Formentera Avenue. Standard bus shelters are located along both directions of Aquitaine Avenue.

Route		Destination
21	Milton Train-Bus	Milton GO Station and Union Station Bus Terminal
27	Milton - Highway 401	Milton GO Station and Finch Bus Terminal via Keele Street & Hwy. 401 and Yorkdale Bus Terminal
27A	Milton - Highway 401	Milton GO Station and Finch Bus Terminal via Meadowvale Business Park
27C	Milton - Highway 401	Milton GO Station and Finch Bus Terminal
48	Guelph - Highway 407	University of Guelph and Highway 407 Bus Terminal
