= A Buck or Two =

Canadian owned and operated chain of discount retail stores

A Buck or Two Stores Ltd.
- Trade name: Buck or Two Plus!
- Company type: Private
- Industry: Retail
- Founded: 1988
- Headquarters: Woodbridge, Ontario, Canada
- Products: Party, Cards, Wrap, Seasonal, Housewares, Stationery, Food & Confection, Hardware, HBA, Pet
- Website: www.buckortwo.com

A Buck or Two Stores Ltd. is a Canadian owned and operated chain of discount retail stores that sell party supplies, cards and wrap, confection, school & office supplies, toys and crafts, seasonal items, housewares, hardware, and other essentials. It has been open since 1988.

Merchandise is mostly priced at $2.00 or less, and consists of both new merchandise (usually imported, though sometimes of Canadian origin) and closeouts. It has locations across Canada.

- Alberta (5)
- British Columbia (2)
- Newfoundland (10)
- Ontario (20)
- Quebec (6)
