= University of Toronto Mississauga bus terminal =

Bus terminal in Mississauga, Ontario, Canada

University of Toronto Mississauga
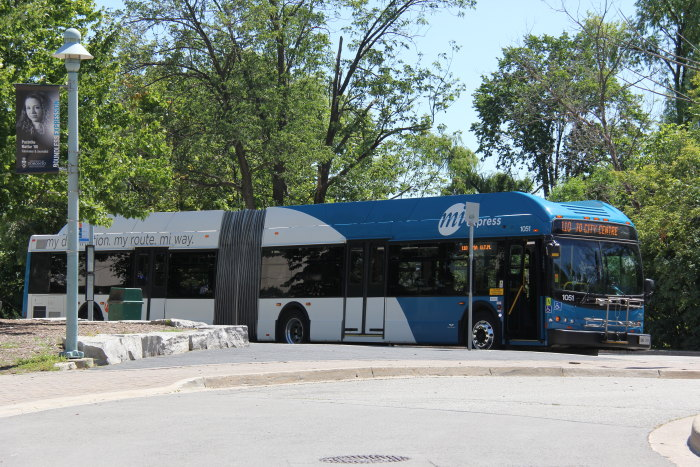
- A MiWay express bus at UTM in 2013

General information
- Location: University of Toronto Mississauga; Mississauga, Ontario; Canada
- Coordinates: 43°32′52″N 79°39′48″W
- Bus stands: 5
- Bus operators: MiWay; Brampton Transit

Construction
- Structure type: Bus shelters
- Cycle facilities: No
- Accessible: Yes

Other information
- Station code: MiWay: 0490, 0910, 0991, 4800
Location

University of Toronto Mississauga (also displayed as UTM) is a MiWay bus terminal serving the campus of the same name in Mississauga, Ontario, Canada. The terminal serves several local and express routes operated by MiWay and one Brampton Transit route.

The terminal is located adjacent to the Kaneff Centre on Inner Circle, a one-way street loop within Outer Circle. It has four MiWay bus stands and two heated bus shelters.

MiWay and the UTM Students' Union have provided a universal transit pass (U-Pass) since 2007 for full-time students at the University of Toronto Mississauga to ride city busses for free.

== Routes served ==
MiWay routes serving the terminal connect UTM to places such as Mississauga City Centre and Meadowvale. Connections to GO Transit can be made at Erin Mills station for regional buses or at stations including Clarkson, Erindale and Kipling for the Lakeshore West and Milton rail lines. The latter station also serves Line 2 Bloor–Danforth of the Toronto subway.

The single Brampton Transit route that stops at the University of Toronto Mississauga has limited service during weekdays and runs between UTM and Brampton Gateway Terminal. It has a dedicated stop near Residence Road adjacent to the MiWay stops.

=== MiWay ===
Route		Direction and destination	Availability
1	Dundas	East to Kipling Terminal; West to Laird Rd at Ridgeway Dr	All week
44	Mississauga Road	North to Meadowvale Town Centre	All week
48	Erin Mills	North to Meadowvale Town Centre	All week
101	Dundas Express	East to Kipling Terminal; West to Laird Rd at Ridgeway Dr	All week
110	University Express	North to City Centre; South to Clarkson GO Station	All week
126	Burnhamthorpe Express	East to Kipling Terminal	Mon–Fri

=== Brampton Transit ===
Route		Direction and destination	Availability
199	UTM Express	Northbound to Brampton Gateway Terminal	Mon–Fri (limited)

== See also ==
- MiWay Terminals and junctions
- Transportation in Mississauga
