= Pearson Airport station =

Railway station in Mississauga, Ontario, Canada

Pearson Airport
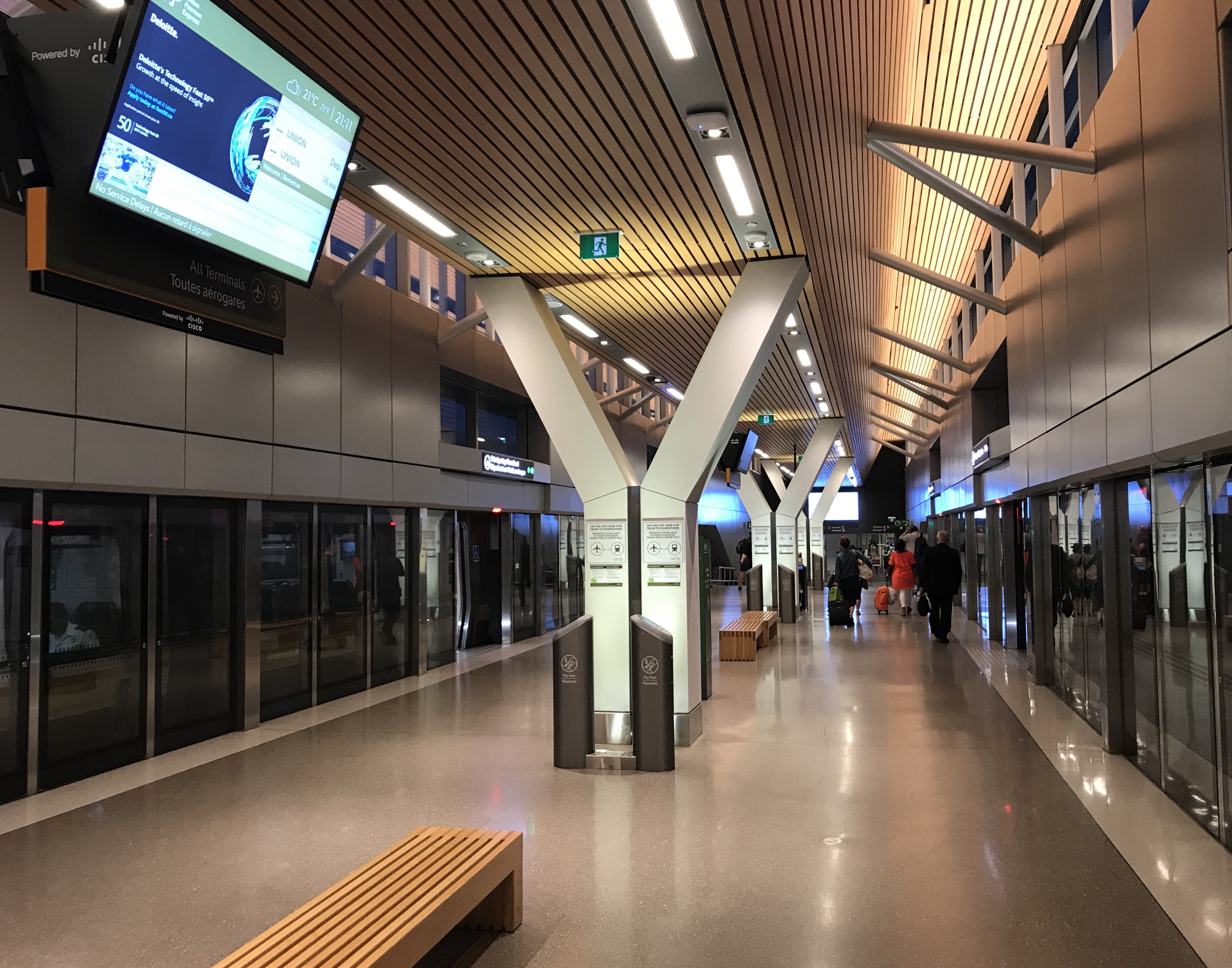
- The Union Pearson Express platform at the station

General information
- Location: Pearson International Airport, Mississauga, Ontario; Canada
- Coordinates: 43°40′59″N 79°36′49″W
- Owner: Greater Toronto Airports Authority
- Operator: Metrolinx and Greater Toronto Airports Authority
- Platforms: 1 island platform
- Tracks: 4 (2 Union Pearson Express, 2 Terminal Link)
- Connections: See connections

Construction
- Structure type: Elevated
- Accessible: Yes

Other information
- Station code: GO Transit: PA
- Website: Pearson Station

History
- Opened: Terminal Link: July 6, 2006; 20 years ago Union Pearson Express: June 6, 2015; 11 years ago
- Rebuilt: Terminal Link: 2015

Services
Preceding station	Metrolinx	Following station
Terminus	Union Pearson Express	Weston toward Union
Track layout
Location

Pearson Airport (also referred to as Pearson) is a railway station located at Terminal 1 at Toronto Pearson International Airport in Mississauga, Ontario, Canada. It is the western terminus of the Union Pearson Express. It is also served by the airport people mover system, Terminal Link, which refers to the station as Terminal 1, and serves as its southern terminus.

== Overview ==
The station consists of two connected island platforms serving four tracks. The innermost pair of tracks terminates halfway along the station and serves the Union Pearson Express on the northern platform, while the outermost pair of tracks runs the full length of the station and serves the Terminal Link on the southern platform. Both platforms are climate controlled and access to trains is via platform screen doors.

== History ==
The station initially opened in July 2006 as a terminus of the three-station Link Train (now known as the Terminal Link). The structure included support pillars allowing the station to be expanded to serve a future airport rail link to downtown Toronto.

In July 2010, Metrolinx, Toronto's regional transport agency, announced it would create a mainline rail connection to Pearson Airport from Union Station. Construction of the spur began in June 2012 at a budget of C$128.6 million. By June 2013, the bulk of the structure – including caissons, columns and girders – were complete, and the first beam of the new station was poured. The station shell was completed by December 2013.

The line opened on June 6, 2015, in time for the 2015 Pan American Games.

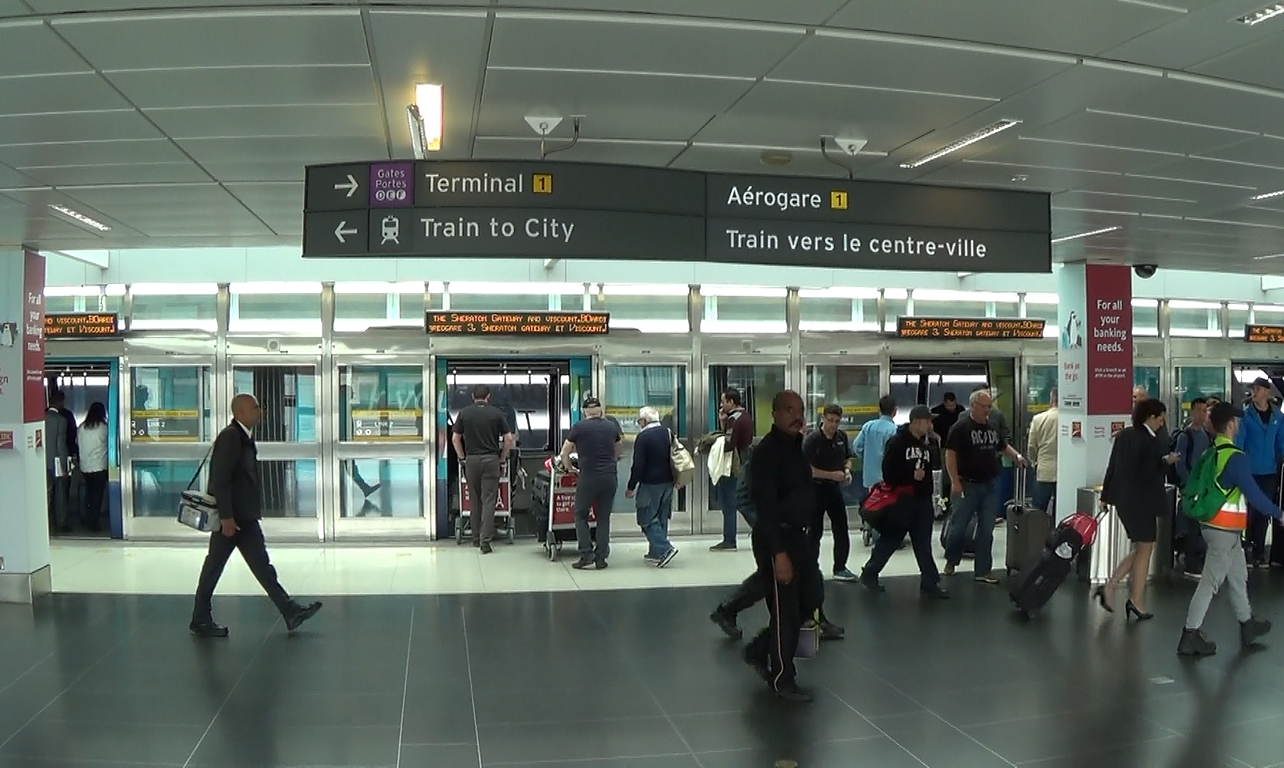
Terminal Link section of platform

== Services ==
The Union Pearson Express operates every 15 minutes throughout the day, with a 25-minute travel time to Union Station in downtown Toronto.

The Terminal Link operates every four minutes throughout most of the day, and every eight minutes between 7:30am and 11:30am, and between 11:30pm and 3:30am. The full trip to Viscount station takes under four minutes.

Ticket vending machines for UP Express are found at the entrance from the airport. There is a cold beverage vending machine located at the end of the platform.

== Connections ==
Several local transit systems provide bus service to Pearson at Terminal 1, which operate from the ground level of Terminal 1 (second curb, Column R4), two floors below the train station.

- Toronto Transit Commission (these buses make an additional stop at Terminal 3 after leaving Terminal 1)
  - Route 900 Airport Express to Kipling station (Line 2 Bloor–Danforth), and route 52A Lawrence West to Lawrence West and Lawrence stations (Line 1 Yonge–University) running during normal service periods
  - Route 952 Lawrence West Express to Lawrence West and Lawrence stations (Line 1 Yonge–University) running during rush hours service periods
  - Routes 300A, 332, and 352 provide overnight TTC service
- MiWay (Mississauga Transit) route 7 (SB to Mississauga City Centre Transit Terminal & NB to Westwood Mall)
- Brampton Transit route 115 (to Bramalea Terminal)
- GO Transit
  - Route 94 (Sheppard–Yonge and Yorkdale stations on Line 1 Yonge–University, as well as GO Transit Yorkdale Bus Terminal, Scarborough Centre Bus Terminal, Square One Bus Terminal and Pickering GO Station on Lakeshore East line and Durham Region Transit connection at Pickering GO Station)
  - Route 40 (Highway 407 station on Line 1 Yonge–University, York Region Transit connection at Highway 407 station and Richmond Hill Centre Terminal and Hamilton Street Railway connections at Hamilton GO Centre)
