= Greater Toronto Airports Authority =

Canadian airport operator

- Type: Non-profit organization
- Industry: Air Transport
- Founded: December 2, 1996
- Headquarters: Toronto Pearson International Airport; Mississauga, Ontario
- Key people: Deborah Flint, CEO and President
- Products: Airport operations and services
- Revenue: CAD $1.1 billion
- Number of employees: 1900
- Website: www.torontopearson.com

The Greater Toronto Airports Authority (GTAA; French: Autorité aéroportuaire du Grand Toronto) is a Canadian non-profit organization that operates Toronto Pearson International Airport in Mississauga, Ontario, Canada. The airport is Canada's largest, which handled 49.5 million passengers in 2018. The headquarters of the GTAA are at 6301, Silver Dart Drive.

The GTAA was formed in 1996 by the Government of Canada, which was divesting its direct control of airports across the country to similar operating agencies. Previously, Pearson International Airport was operated directly by a ministry of the Government of Canada. Its mission is to operate the airport in a self-sufficient fashion. It receives its revenues from landing fees on airlines, departure fees on passengers, parking revenues, and facility rentals. The revenues are used for operating and capital expenses. The GTAA completed a CA$4.4 billion (US$314) redevelopment of Toronto Pearson from 1998 to 2008 to enable the airport to handle increases in traffic into the future. A second international airport for Toronto was proposed since the 1970s, with a planned location in Pickering and would have been under the ownership of the GTAA. However, the proposal had never advanced to the construction phase.

== See also ==
- GTAA Cogeneration Plant
- Union Pearson Express
- Terminal Link
- Transport Canada
