= Terminal Link =

Automated people mover at Toronto's Pearson Airport

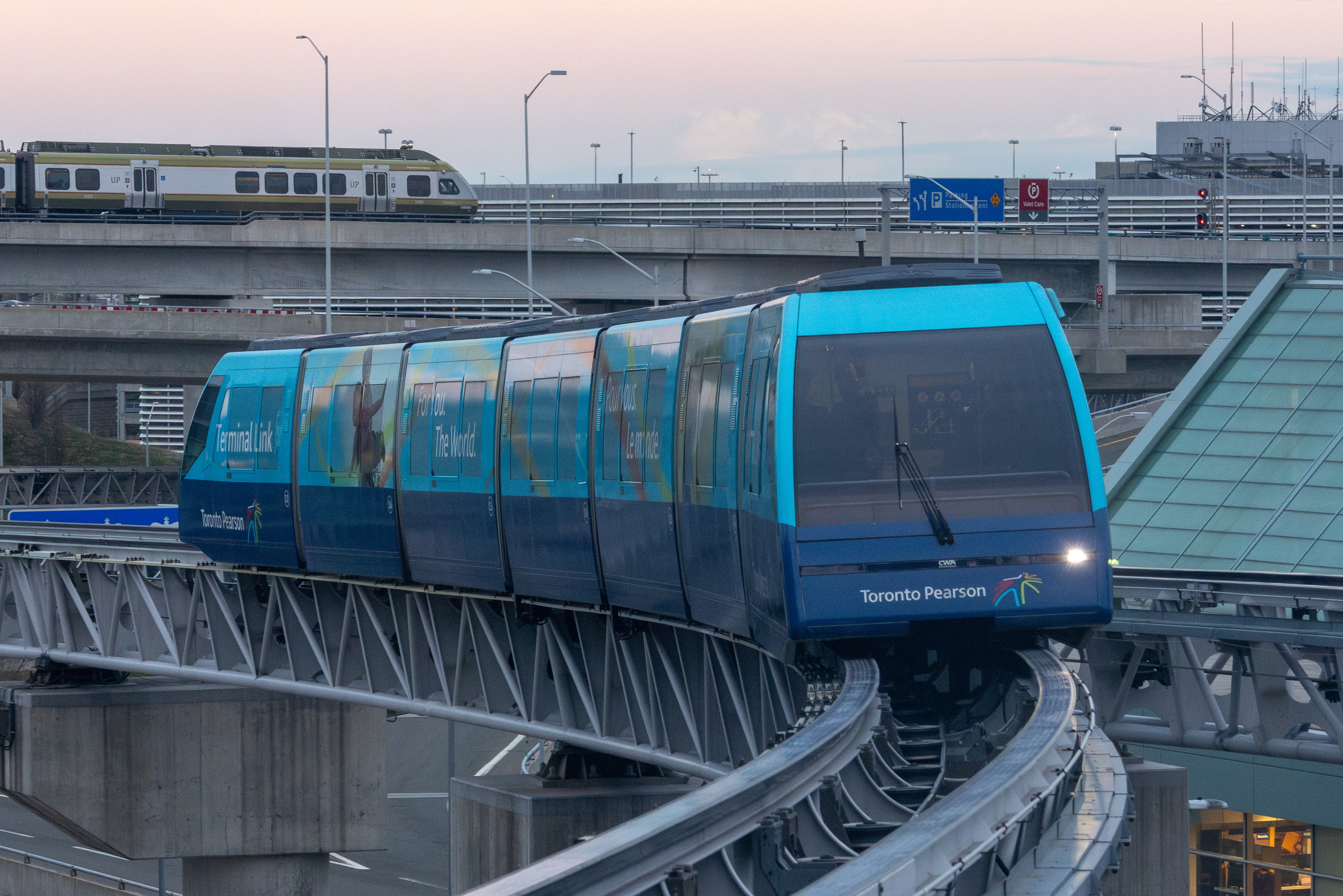
- Terminal Link train arriving at Terminal 3 station

Overview
- Status: Operational
- Owner: Greater Toronto Airports Authority
- Locale: Toronto Pearson International Airport, Mississauga, Ontario, Canada
- Termini: Terminal 1; Viscount
- Stations: 3

Service
- Type: Automated people mover
- Operator: Greater Toronto Airports Authority
- Rolling stock: DCC Cable Liner
- Daily ridership: 17,000 (2012)

History
- Opened: July 6, 2006; 20 years ago

Technical
- Line length: 1.5 km (0.9 mi)
- Num of tracks: 2 parallel shuttles
- Character: Elevated
- Track gauge: Automated guideway transit
- Electrification: 36 mm (1.4 in) cable propelled transit
- Operating speed: 43.2 km/h (26.84 mph)

The Terminal Link, formerly known as the Link Train, is an automated people mover at Toronto Pearson International Airport in Mississauga, Ontario, Canada. The wheelchair-accessible train runs 24 hours a day, seven days a week and is completely free-of-charge to ride. In 2012, it transported 17,000 passengers daily, 60 to 70% of whom were airport staff.

== History ==
The original proposal for an automated people mover system at Pearson Airport was submitted in May 2002. Six months later, on November 15, 2002, a CA$55-million contract was signed with DCC Doppelmayr Cable Car GmbH of Wolfurt, Austria, followed by four years of construction. The system opened to the public on July 6, 2006 at a cost of $150 million. The service initially operated alongside its predecessor, the Link shuttle bus system.

On March 30, 2009, the Link Train was put out of service for extensive maintenance due to engineering design flaws. During this time, service was replaced by an inter-terminal shuttle bus. Normal service resumed in July 2009.

On March 16, 2013, the Link Train was shut down for approximately eight months during construction of the Union Pearson Express. The trains were refurbished during this time and received a seventh car, new seats, and a new paint scheme.

== Design and rolling stock ==
The Terminal Link uses a pair of Cable Liner trains, each composed of seven permanently-coupled cars. They use a cable-hauled, drive and tension system. Each train has capacity for 175 passengers with baggage (25 per car: 17 standing, 8 seated) or 2,500 passengers per hour per direction (pphpd).

The two trains, plus a small work car, cost a total of CA$56 million when delivered. They were refurbished in 2013, and received a new paint scheme, new seats, and a seventh car (they were originally delivered and used as six-car trains).

== Stations and connections ==
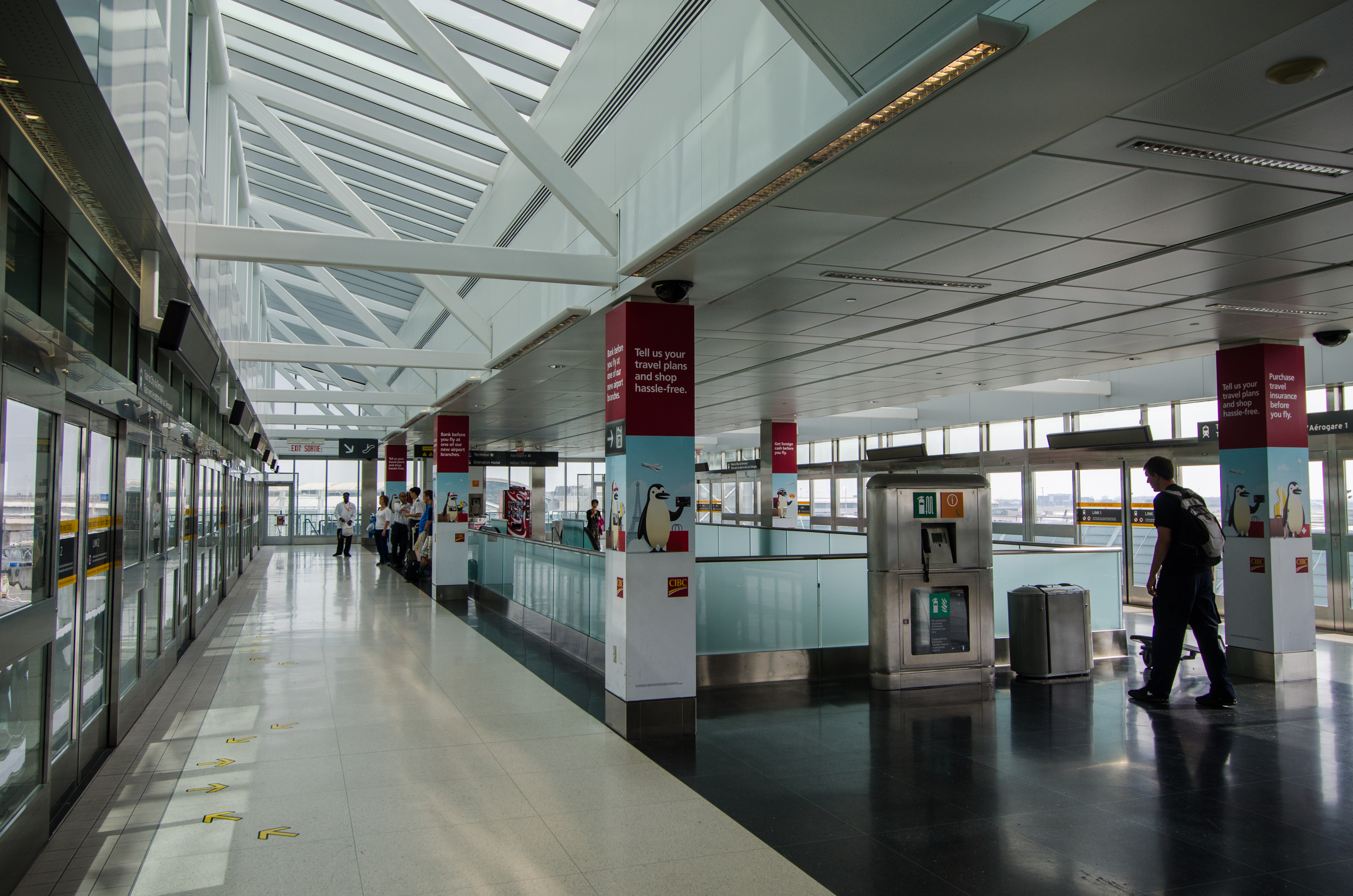
Terminal 3 station

The two fully elevated lines, running side-by-side, are 1.5 kilometres (0.9 mi) long, and have a one-way travel time of four minutes. They serve three stations: Terminal 1, Terminal 3, and Viscount (long-term parking on Airport Road). Each station consists of a single island platform, with platform screen doors separating the tracks.

Stations
Station	Transit connections
Terminal 1	Union Pearson Express; GO Transit buses; TTC buses; MiWay; Brampton Transit
Terminal 3	TTC buses
Viscount	TTC buses; MiWay; Brampton Transit

The Union Pearson Express airport rail link service between Pearson Airport and Union Station in Downtown Toronto opened on June 6, 2015, in time for the 2015 Pan American Games. It directly serves Terminal 1 with its station integrated with the Terminal Link.

A number of public transport bus services in the GTA have a stop on the lower level of Terminal 1; these include the Toronto Transit Commission (TTC), MiWay, Brampton Transit, and GO Transit. The TTC has an additional stop on the lower level at Terminal 3, served after departing Terminal 1. At Viscount station, connections to MiWay and Brampton Transit's Züm can be made.

As originally proposed, Line 5 Eglinton was to connect Pearson Airport with Scarborough by 2018 as part of the Transit City plan. However, when the four Transit City lines were found to be $2.4 billion over their funding envelope in January 2010, parts of the network were deferred, including the western section of the Eglinton LRT. A future extension could eventually reach the airport, completing the line as envisioned. As of 2020, planning for the western extension is underway and Metrolinx hopes to complete the line by 2030–31.

== Operations ==
Both lines operate independently in shuttle mode with a total capacity of up to 2,180 pphpd. The trains run on rubber tires on a smooth steel surface and all propulsion is provided by the cable. The absence of onboard motors, braking systems and gearboxes eliminates excessive noise, oil spills from the trains, and dust from brakes. Doppelmayr asserts that a cable-driven APM is the most environmentally responsible solution for transportation in high density applications.

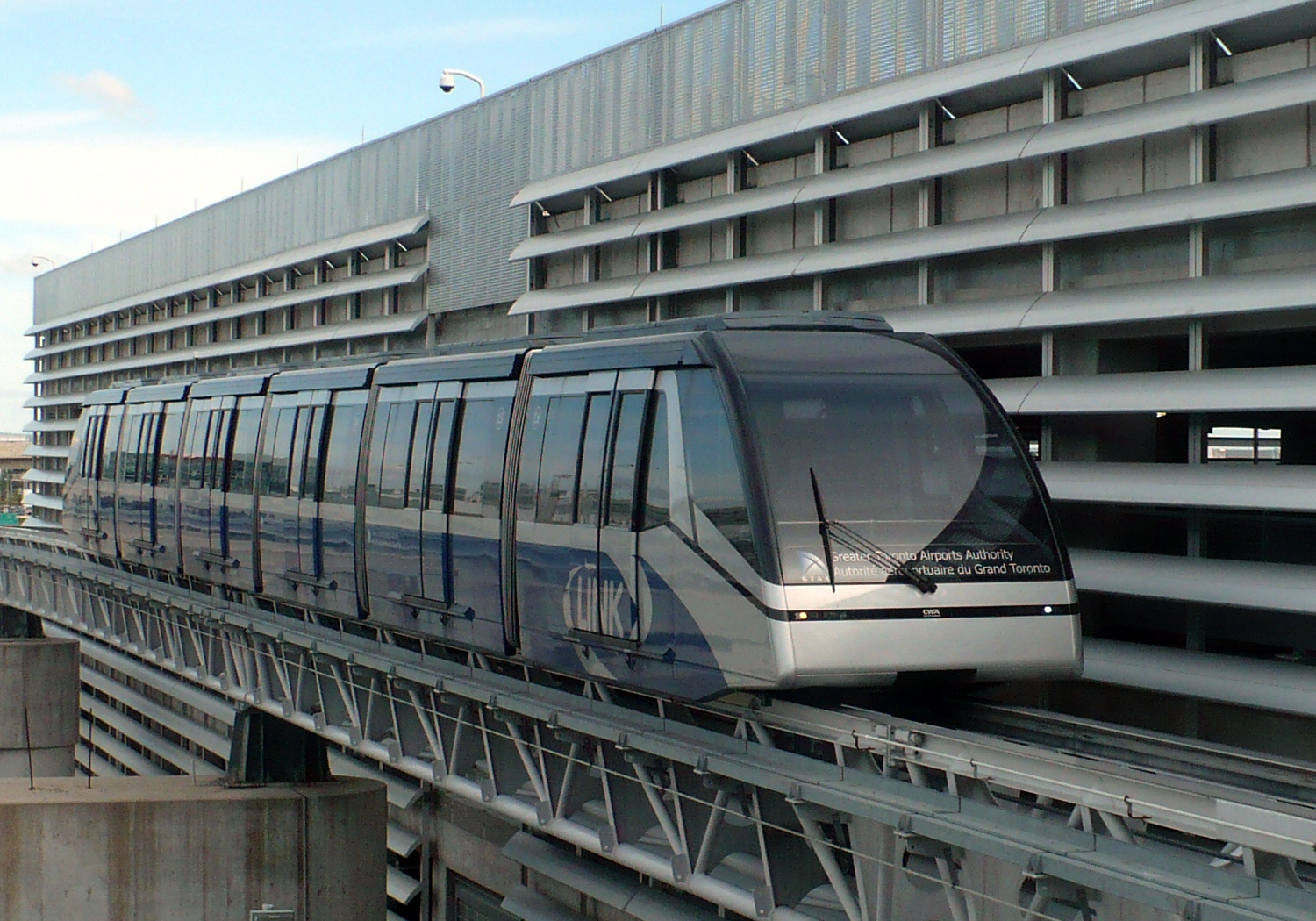
Terminal Link train approaching Terminal 1 station in 2012, in old livery

Specifications
Length	1,473 metres (4,833 ft)
Configuration	Dual track shuttle with two trains operating independently
Operating speed	43.2 kilometres per hour (26.8 mph)
Headway	250 s
Dwell time	36 s
Guideway	Elevated steel tube truss
System capacity	2,500 pphpd
Stations	3
Trains	Two 7-car trains
Train capacity	25 passengers/vehicle, 175 passengers/train

== See also ==
- Union Pearson Express
- Transportation in Mississauga
