= Toronto Pearson International Airport =

Airport in Toronto, Ontario, Canada

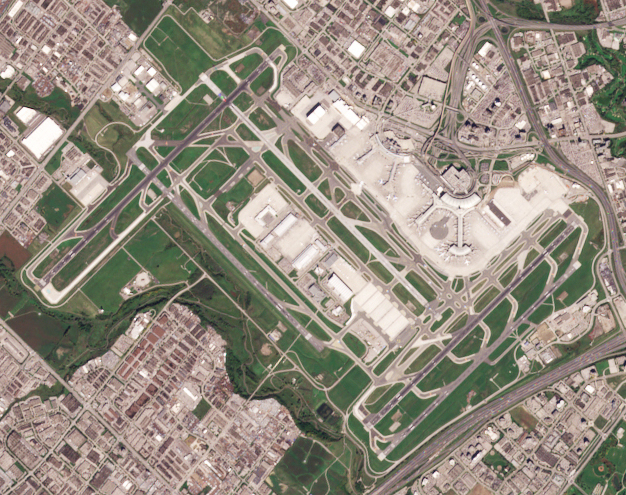
- Aerial view of Toronto Pearson International Airport in 2018
- IATA: YYZ; ICAO: CYYZ; WMO: 71624

Summary
- Airport type: Public
- Owner: Transport Canada
- Operator: Greater Toronto Airports Authority
- Location: Mississauga / Toronto, Ontario, Canada (Note: Most of the airport is located in Mississauga, with a small portion located within Toronto.)
- Opened: August 29, 1938; 88 years ago
- Hub for: Air Canada; Porter Airlines; WestJet; Air Transat
- Operating base for: Flair Airlines
- Time zone: EST (UTC−05:00)
  - Summer (DST): EDT (UTC−04:00)
- Elevation AMSL: 569 ft (173 m)
- Coordinates: 43°40′34″N 079°37′50″W
- Public transit access: Pearson Airport station
- Website: www.torontopearson.com

Maps
- Airport Diagram (2024)
- Interactive map of Toronto Pearson International Airport

Runways
Direction	Length		Surface
Direction	ft	m	Surface
05/23	11,120	3,389	Asphalt
06L/24R	9,697	2,956	Asphalt
06R/24L	9,000	2,743	Asphalt
15L/33R	11,050	3,368	Asphalt
15R/33L	9,088	2,770	Asphalt

Statistics (2025)
- Passengers: 47,300,000 ▲1.1%
- Aircraft movements: 392,500 ▲0.7%
- Cargo (metric tons): 441,500
- Sources: Greater Toronto Airports Authority Greater Toronto Airports AuthorityCanada Flight Supplement; Environment Canada; Transport Canada; Movements from Statistics Canada; Toronto Pearson Traffic Summary

Toronto Pearson International Airport (Note: originally Malton Airport, simply Toronto Pearson or Pearson, and officially Lester B. Pearson International Airport) (IATA: YYZ, ICAO: CYYZ) is an international airport primarily located in Mississauga, Ontario, Canada. It is the main airport serving Toronto, its metropolitan area, and the surrounding region known as the Golden Horseshoe. Pearson is the largest and busiest airport in Canada, and the 49th-busiest airport in the world, handling 47.3 million passengers in 2025. It is named in honour of Lester B. Pearson (1897–1972), the 14th Prime Minister of Canada and 1957 Nobel Peace Prize laureate.

Pearson International Airport is situated 20 km (12 miles) northwest of downtown Toronto in the adjacent city of Mississauga, with a small portion of the airfield extending into Toronto's western district of Etobicoke. It has five runways and two passenger terminals along with numerous cargo, maintenance, and aerospace production facilities on a site that covers 1,867 hectares (4,613 acres).

Toronto Pearson is the primary global hub for Air Canada. It also serves as a hub for Porter Airlines and WestJet, as a focus city for Air Transat, and a base of operations for Flair Airlines. Pearson is operated by the Greater Toronto Airports Authority (GTAA) as part of Transport Canada's National Airports System and is supported by around 50,000 workers. The airport maintains facilities for United States border preclearance.

An extensive network of non-stop domestic flights is operated from Toronto Pearson by several airlines to all major and many secondary cities across all provinces and territories of Canada. As of 2026, more than 50 airlines operate non-stop or direct flights from Pearson to more than 180 destinations across all six inhabited continents.

== History ==
In 1937, the Government of Canada agreed to support the building of two airports in the Toronto area. One site selected was on the Toronto Islands, which is the present-day Billy Bishop Toronto City Airport. The other site selected was at Elmbank, northwest of Toronto near the town of Malton in what was then Toronto Township (which would later become Mississauga to avoid confusion with the nearby city of Toronto), which was originally intended to serve as an alternate to the downtown airport but instead would become its successor due to having a much larger space without being constrained by Lake Ontario and Toronto Inner Harbour. The first scheduled passenger flight at the Malton Airport was a Trans-Canada Air Lines DC-3 that landed on August 29, 1939.

During the Second World War, the Royal Canadian Air Force established a base at the airport as a component of the British Commonwealth Air Training Plan. RCAF Station Malton was home to several training schools and was in operation between 1940 and 1946.

In 1958, the municipal government of Toronto sold the Malton Airport to the Government of Canada, which subsequently renamed the facility to Toronto International Airport, under the management of Transport Canada. The airport was officially renamed Lester B. Pearson International Airport on January 2, 1984, in honour of Toronto-born Lester B. Pearson, the 14th prime minister of Canada and recipient of the 1957 Nobel Peace Prize. The Greater Toronto Airports Authority (GTAA) assumed management, operation, and control of the airport in 1996, and has used the name Toronto Pearson International Airport for the facility since the transition.

Since Toronto has more than one airport, YTO is used for the area designation. At the same time, Pearson is coded YYZ, Billy Bishop Toronto City Airport is YTZ, and Toronto/Buttonville Municipal Airport in Markham, until its closure on November 24, 2023, was YKZ. YZ was the code for the station in Malton, Ontario, where Pearson Airport is located, and hence the IATA code for Pearson Airport is YYZ. The telegraph station in Toronto itself was coded TZ, which is why Toronto's smaller Billy Bishop Airport is coded YTZ.

== Terminals ==
Toronto Pearson International Airport has two active public terminals, Terminal 1 and Terminal 3. Both terminals handle the three main sectors of air travel—domestic, transborder (to the United States), and international. As a result, terminal operations at Toronto Pearson are organized primarily by airline and airline alliance rather than by the type of route.

The former Terminal 2, which opened in 1972, was permanently closed and demolished in 2008 to allow for the expansion of the current Terminal 1.

=== Terminal 1 ===
Terminal 1 is a 346,000 m^{2} (3,724,000 ft^{2}) facility with 58 gates. It was designed by a joint venture known as Airports Architects Canada, consisting of Skidmore, Owings & Merrill, Adamson Associates Architects, and Moshe Safdie and Associates. The terminal opened in 2004, replacing the former Aeroquay One (also referred to as the original Terminal 1).

Terminal 1 is primarily used by Air Canada and its subsidiaries, all members of Star Alliance, Oneworld member Royal Air Maroc, and several non-alliance airlines including Air North, Emirates, and Etihad Airways.

The terminal contains three concourses: D, E, and F. Concourse D is used for domestic flights, Concourse E for international flights, and Concourse F for transborder flights to the United States. Concourse F functions as a United States border preclearance area.

Terminal 1 also includes multiple airline lounges and passenger facilities. Two gates (E73 and E75) are designed to accommodate the Airbus A380 aircraft, which has been used on flights to Toronto by airlines such as Emirates and Etihad Airways.

=== Terminal 3 ===
Terminal 3 is a 178,000 m^{2} (1,916,000 ft^{2}) facility with 46 gates, designed by B+H Architects and Scott Associates Architects Inc. The terminal opened in 1991 and previously served as a major hub for the now-defunct airline Canadian Airlines.

Terminal 3 is used by most Oneworld airlines except Royal Air Maroc, as well as all SkyTeam airlines. Other airlines operating from the terminal include Air Transat, Flair Airlines, Porter Airlines, and WestJet.

The terminal contains three concourses—A, B, and C. Concourse A is used for transborder flights to the United States and includes a United States border preclearance facility. Concourses B and C handle domestic and international flights and are connected airside.

=== Infield Concourse ===
The Infield Concourse (IFC) was originally built to handle passenger traffic during the construction of the current Terminal 1. Its 11 gates opened gradually between 2002 and 2003. In 2009, the facility was closed for regular operations after the completion of the new Terminal 1, although the Greater Toronto Airports Authority retained it for potential future use.

The terminal was renovated in 2015 to serve as a reception facility for government-sponsored refugees of the Syrian civil war. Additional renovations were completed in 2018, and the concourse was reactivated as an extension of Terminal 3 to accommodate seasonal demand. Passengers traveling through the IFC are transported by bus between Terminal 3 and the concourse.

=== VIP Terminal ===
Skyservice operates a private FBO terminal at Toronto Pearson located on Midfield Road in the airport's infield area. The facility handles most private aircraft arriving and departing from the airport and provides services such as concierge assistance, private customs and immigration processing, catering, baggage handling, and ground transportation for passengers.

== Infrastructure and operations ==
=== Runways ===
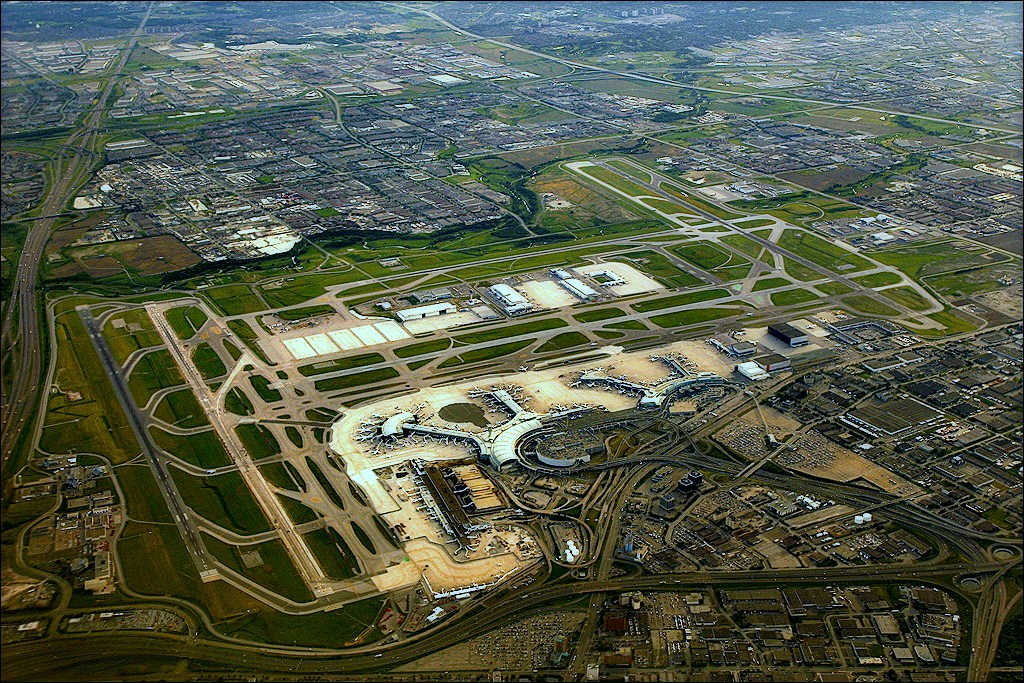
Aerial view of the airport in 2007 after permanent closure of Terminal 2. Two of the airport's three east–west runways are visible in the left foreground, whereas its north–south runways are visible in the centre.

Toronto Pearson has five runways, three of which are aligned in the east–west direction, and two in the north–south direction. A large network of taxiways, collectively measuring over 40 km (25 miles) in length, provides access between the runways and the passenger terminals, air cargo areas, and airline hangar areas.

Number	Length	Width	ILS	Alignment
05/23	11,120 ft (3,390 m)	200 ft (61 m)	Cat. IIIa (05), Cat. I (23)	East–west
06L/24R	9,697 ft (2,956 m)	200 ft (61 m)	Cat. IIIa (6L), Cat. I (24R)	East–west
06R/24L	9,000 ft (2,700 m)	200 ft (61 m)	Cat. I (both directions)	East–west
15L/33R	11,050 ft (3,370 m)	200 ft (61 m)	Cat. I (both directions)	North–south
15R/33L	9,088 ft (2,770 m)	200 ft (61 m)	Cat. I (both directions)	North–south

=== Airfield operations ===
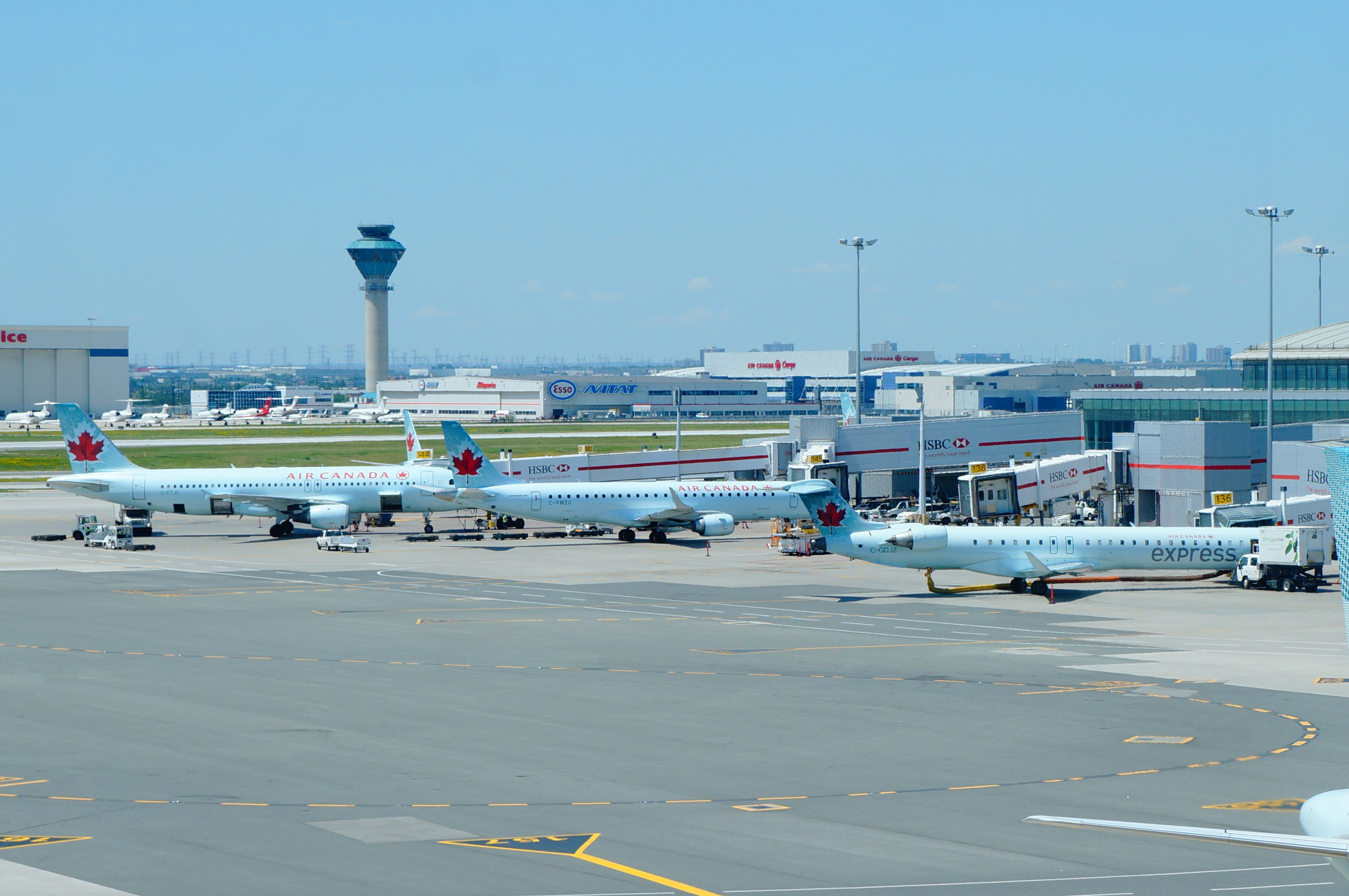
Airport apron of Pearson Airport in 2013, with the airport's infield operations and main control tower visible in the background

Toronto Pearson is home to the Toronto Area Control Centre, one of seven area control centres in Canada operated by Nav Canada. The airport uses a Traffic Management Unit (TMU), located in the apron control tower at Terminal 1, to control the movement of aircraft and other airport traffic on the ground. The main air traffic control tower at Toronto Pearson is located within the infield operations area of the airport.

The airfield maintenance unit is responsible for general maintenance and repairs at Toronto Pearson. During the winter months, the unit expands into a dedicated 24-hour snow removal team of more than 200 workers tasked with ensuring normal operations at the airport, as Toronto Pearson regularly experiences 110 to 130 cm (43 to 51 inches) of total snow accumulation in a typical winter season. The airport employs over 94 pieces of snow removal equipment, including 11 Vammas PSB series, four Oshkosh Corporation Snow Products HT-Series snowplow units, and 14 snowmelters.

The airport's central de-icing facility is the largest in the world, servicing over 10,500 aircraft each winter. The six de-icing bays, covering a total area of 24 hectares (60 acres), can handle 12 aircraft simultaneously and take between 2 and 19 minutes to de-ice each aircraft depending on factors such as weather and aircraft specifications.

The Toronto Pearson Fire and Emergency Services, operated by the Greater Toronto Airports Authority (GTAA) maintains three stations at the airport; one to the north, one to the south, and one offsite to the east, with more than 80 firefighters providing fire and rescue operations at Toronto Pearson. They are equipped with six crash tenders as well as several pumpers, aerial ladders, and heavy rescue units. The Toronto Pearson Fire and Emergency Services operates in conjunction with the Fire and Emergency Services Training Institute, located at the northwest end of the airport grounds.

=== Cargo facilities ===
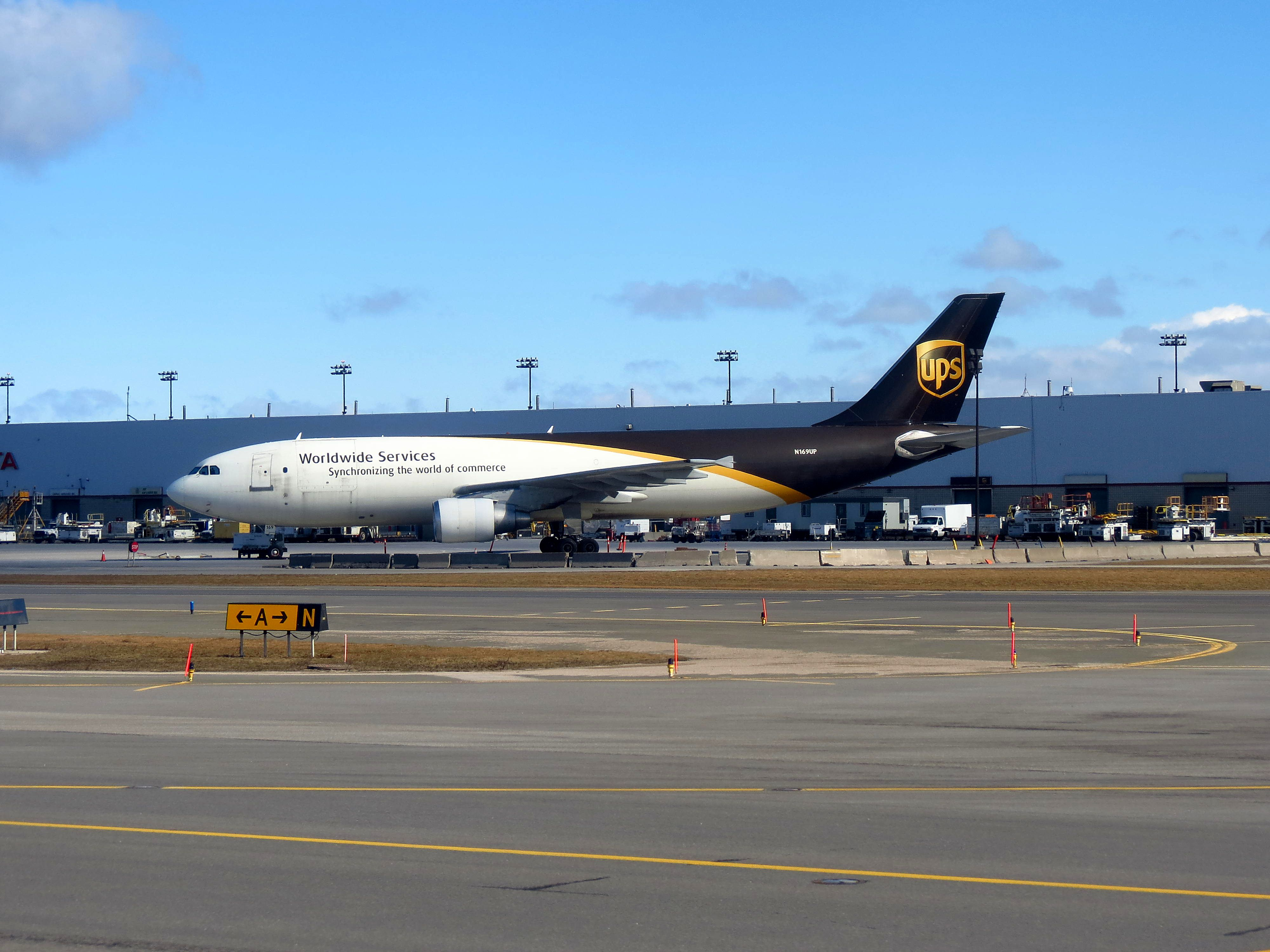
UPS Airbus A300 unloading cargo at the airport's VISTA cargo facility in 2015

Toronto Pearson handles approximately half of all the international air cargo in Canada. The airport has three main cargo facilities, known as Cargo West (Infield), Cargo East (VISTA), and Cargo North (FedEx).

The Cargo West facility (also known as the Infield Cargo Area) is located between runways 15L/33R and 15R/33L. It is a multi-tenant facility including three large buildings with 52,600 m^{2} (566,000 ft^{2}) of warehouse space, a common use cargo apron, vehicle parking, and a truck maneuvering area. A four-lane vehicle tunnel connects the Infield Cargo Area to the passenger terminal area of the airport.

The Cargo East facility (also known as the VISTA cargo area) is located north of Terminal 3. The VISTA cargo area is a multi-tenant facility of several buildings organized in a U-shape, with 29,500 m^{2} (318,000 ft^{2}) of warehouse space and an adjacent common-use cargo apron.

The Cargo North facility is the Canadian hub for FedEx Express. The site occupies an area on the north side of the airport near runway 05/23 and is home to two buildings operated exclusively by FedEx with 32,100 m^{2} (346,000 ft^{2}) of warehouse space and a dedicated cargo apron.

=== Security ===
The Peel Regional Police is the primary law enforcement agency at Pearson Airport. The Royal Canadian Mounted Police (RCMP) also maintain a Toronto Airport Detachment at Pearson Airport, which provides federal law enforcement services.

The Canadian Air Transport Security Authority (CATSA) is responsible for security screening procedures at Pearson Airport. Other government agencies with security operations at Pearson include the Canada Border Services Agency (CBSA), Immigration, Refugees and Citizenship Canada (IRCC), the Canadian Security Intelligence Service (CSIS), and Transport Canada. In addition, U.S. Customs and Border Protection (CBP) and United States Citizenship and Immigration Services (USCIS) from the United States also conduct operations at the airport to facilitate United States border preclearance.

=== Other facilities ===
Pearson Airport has seven aircraft maintenance hangars, operated by Air Canada, Air Transat, WestJet, and the GTAA, which are used for line maintenance and routine aircraft inspections. At the north end of the airfield are numerous independently operated hangars for charter aircraft and personal private aircraft based at Pearson Airport, along with passenger and maintenance facilities to service them.

The Greater Toronto Airports Authority maintains administrative offices on Convair Drive, near the southeast corner of the airfield. Gategourmet and CLS Catering Services both operate dedicated flight kitchen facilities at Pearson Airport for airline catering services. Aviation fuel is supplied by Esso Avitat (Jet A-1) and Shell Aerocentre (Jet A and A-1), both located in the infield operations area of the airport.

Bombardier Aviation's Bombardier Global Express business jet final assembly is completed at the Bombardier Aerospace Campus located on the north side of the airfield.

== Airlines and destinations ==
=== Passenger ===
Airlines	Destinations
Aer Lingus	Dublin
Aeroméxico	Mexico City–Benito Juárez
Air Canada	Amsterdam, Austin, Barbados, Bogotá, Boston, Buenos Aires–Ezeiza, Calgary, Cancún, Chicago–O'Hare, Copenhagen, Dallas/Fort Worth, Delhi–Indira Gandhi, Denver, Dubai–International (resumes March 27, 2027), Dublin, Edmonton, Fort McMurray, Frankfurt, Grenada, Guadalajara, Guatemala City (begins December 1, 2026), Halifax, Houston–Intercontinental, Las Vegas, Liberia (CR), Lisbon, London–Heathrow, Los Angeles, Manchester (UK), Mexico City–Benito Juárez, Miami, Montego Bay, Monterrey, Montréal–Trudeau, Munich, Nashville, Nassau, New Orleans, New York–LaGuardia, Newark, Ottawa, Paris–Charles de Gaulle, Port of Spain, Providenciales, Puerto Vallarta, Québec City, Regina, Rome–Fiumicino, St. John's (NL), San Diego, San Francisco, San José (CR), São Paulo–Guarulhos, Saskatoon, Seattle/Tacoma, Seoul–Incheon, Shanghai–Pudong, Sint Maarten, Sydney–Kingsford Smith, Tel Aviv (resumes November 30, 2026), Thunder Bay, Tokyo–Haneda, Tokyo–Narita, Vancouver, Victoria, Vienna, Winnipeg, Zurich; Seasonal: Athens, Barcelona, Brussels, Budapest, Cartagena, Edinburgh, Fort-de-France, Fort Lauderdale, George Town, Honolulu, Lima, Madrid, Mérida , Minneapolis/St. Paul, Moncton, Nice (begins June 16, 2027), Orlando, Osaka–Kansai, Oslo (begins June 2, 2027), Palm Springs, Philadelphia, Phoenix–Sky Harbor, Pointe-à-Pitre, Ponta Delgada, Prague, Punta Cana, Quito (begins December 5, 2026), Raleigh/Durham, Reykjavík–Keflavík, Rio de Janeiro–Galeão, Roatán (begins December 13, 2026), Sacramento, San Antonio, San José del Cabo, Saint John (NB), St. Louis, Santiago de Chile, Sarasota, Shannon (begins June 10, 2027), Stockholm–Arlanda, Tenerife–South Tulum, Venice, West Palm Beach
Air Canada Express	Atlanta, Boston, Charlotte, Chicago–O'Hare, Cincinnati, Cleveland, Columbus–Glenn, Detroit, London (ON), Minneapolis/St. Paul, Montréal–Trudeau, New York–LaGuardia, Newark, Philadelphia, Pittsburgh, Raleigh/Durham, St. Louis, Saint John (NB), Sault Ste. Marie (ON), Sudbury, Sydney (NS), Timmins, Washington–Dulles, Washington–National, Windsor; Seasonal: Deer Lake, Gander, Indianapolis, Jacksonville (FL), Louisville (begins April 28, 2027)
Air Canada Rouge	Antigua, Aruba, Bermuda, Cancún, Charlottetown, Curaçao, Deer Lake, Fort Lauderdale, Fort Myers, Fredericton, Grand Cayman, Kelowna, Kingston–Norman Manley, Las Vegas, Miami, Moncton, Orlando, Phoenix–Sky Harbor, Puerto Plata, Punta Cana, St. John's (NL), St. Lucia–Hewanorra, St. Vincent–Argyle, Tampa, Seasonal: Belize City, Cozumel, Huatulco, Puerto Escondido, St. Kitts, Saint John (NB), Salt Lake City, Samaná, San Juan, Thunder Bay
Air China	Beijing–Capital
Air France	Paris–Charles de Gaulle
Air India	Delhi–Indira Gandhi; Seasonal: Mumbai–Shivaji
Air North	Whitehorse, Yellowknife
Air Serbia	Seasonal: Belgrade
Air Transat	Cancún, Cartagena, Faro, Glasgow, Istanbul, Lima, Lisbon, London–Gatwick, Manchester (UK), Medellín–JMC, Montego Bay, Montréal–Trudeau, Paris–Charles de Gaulle, Porto, Puerto Plata, Punta Cana, Samaná; Seasonal: Amsterdam, Athens, Birmingham (UK) (begins June 22, 2027), Dublin, Fort-de-France (begins December 19, 2026), Georgetown–Cheddi Jagan, Gran Canaria (begins December 13, 2026), Lamezia Terme, La Romana, Liberia (CR), Puerto Vallarta, Rio de Janeiro–Galeão, Río Hato, Rome–Fiumicino, San José (CR), Sint Maarten, Tirana, Venice, Zagreb
Alaska Airlines	Seattle/Tacoma
American Airlines	Charlotte, Dallas/Fort Worth, Miami
American Eagle	Charlotte, Chicago–O'Hare, New York–LaGuardia, Philadelphia, Washington–National
Arajet	Punta Cana
Avianca	Bogotá
Avianca El Salvador	San Salvador
Azores Airlines	Ponta Delgada; Seasonal: Funchal, Terceira
BermudAir	Bermuda; Seasonal: Anguilla, Providenciales (both begin December 19, 2026)
Biman Bangladesh Airlines	Dhaka
British Airways	London–Heathrow
Caribbean Airlines	Georgetown–Cheddi Jagan, Kingston–Norman Manley, Port of Spain, Tobago
Cathay Pacific	Hong Kong
China Eastern Airlines	Shanghai–Pudong
China Southern Airlines	Guangzhou
Condor	Frankfurt
Copa Airlines	Panama City–Tocumen
Delta Air Lines	Atlanta; Seasonal: Salt Lake City
Delta Connection	Detroit, Minneapolis/St. Paul, New York–JFK, New York–LaGuardia
Egyptair	Cairo
Emirates	Dubai–International
Ethiopian Airlines	Addis Ababa
Etihad Airways	Abu Dhabi
EVA Air	Taipei–Taoyuan
Finnair	Seasonal: Helsinki
Flair Airlines	Abbotsford, Calgary, Cancún, Edmonton, Fort Lauderdale, Guadalajara, Halifax, Kingston–Norman Manley, Mexico City–Benito Juárez, St. John's (NL), Vancouver, Winnipeg; Seasonal: Moncton, Montego Bay, Orlando, Palm Springs, Puerto Plata (begins December 19, 2026), Puerto Vallarta, Punta Cana, Saint John (NB), Thunder Bay
Hainan Airlines	Beijing–Capital
Iberia	Seasonal: Madrid
Icelandair	Reykjavík–Keflavík
ITA Airways	Seasonal: Rome–Fiumicino
KLM	Amsterdam
Korean Air	Seoul–Incheon
LOT Polish Airlines	Warsaw–Chopin
Lufthansa	Frankfurt; Seasonal: Munich
Pakistan International Airlines	Islamabad, Karachi, Lahore
Philippine Airlines	Manila
Porter Airlines	Austin, Boston, Calgary, Cancún, Edmonton, Fort Lauderdale, Halifax, Kelowna, Las Vegas, Los Angeles, Montréal–MET, Montréal–Trudeau, New York–LaGuardia, Orlando, Ottawa, Phoenix–Sky Harbor, Québec City, St. John's (NL), San Francisco, Saskatoon, Thunder Bay, Vancouver, Victoria, Winnipeg; Seasonal: Aruba, Charlottetown, Deer Lake, Fort Myers, Grand Cayman, Liberia (CR), Miami, Moncton, Montego Bay (begins November 23, 2026), Nassau, Palm Springs, Providenciales, Puerto Vallarta, San José del Cabo, San José (CR) (begins December 2, 2026), Tampa, West Palm Beach
Qatar Airways	Doha
Royal Air Maroc	Casablanca
Royal Jordanian	Amman–Queen Alia
Saudia	Jeddah
Scandinavian Airlines	Copenhagen
Sun Country Airlines	Seasonal: Minneapolis/St. Paul
Swiss International Air Lines	Seasonal: Zurich
TAP Air Portugal	Lisbon
Turkish Airlines	Istanbul
United Airlines	Chicago–O'Hare, Denver, Houston–Intercontinental, San Francisco
United Express	Chicago–O'Hare, Newark, Washington–Dulles
Virgin Atlantic	London–Heathrow
WestJet	Antigua, Aruba, Barbados, Calgary, Cancún, Edmonton, Fort Lauderdale, Fort Myers, Grand Cayman, Halifax, Kelowna (resumes March 25, 2027), Kingston–Norman Manley, Liberia (CR), Montego Bay, Montréal–Trudeau, Nassau, Orlando, Ottawa, Puerto Plata, Puerto Vallarta, Punta Cana, Regina, St. Lucia–Hewanorra, San José del Cabo, Saskatoon, Sint Maarten, Tampa, Vancouver, Winnipeg; Seasonal: Belize City, Bonaire, Cardiff, Comox, Cozumel, Curaçao, Dublin, Edinburgh, Freeport, Grenada, Huatulco, Mérida, Nashville, Ponta Delgada, Providenciales, Roatán, St. John's (NL), Samaná, San Juan, Tulum
Zipair Tokyo	Tokyo–Narita (begins March 2, 2027)

=== Cargo ===
Airlines	Destinations
Air Canada Cargo	Atlanta, Bogotá, Chicago–O'Hare, Dallas/Fort Worth, Guadalajara, Lima, Mexico City–Felipe Ángeles, Miami, Quito, San José (CR), San Juan,
Cathay Pacific Cargo	Hong Kong
China Airlines Cargo	Taipei–Taoyuan
Emirates SkyCargo	Dubai–Al Maktoum
EVA Air Cargo	Taipei–Taoyuan
FedEx Express	Edmonton
FedEx Express operated by Morningstar Air Express	Edmonton
Korean Air Cargo	Anchorage, New York–JFK, Seoul–Incheon
Lufthansa Cargo	Frankfurt
Qatar Airways	Doha

== Ground transportation ==
=== Train ===
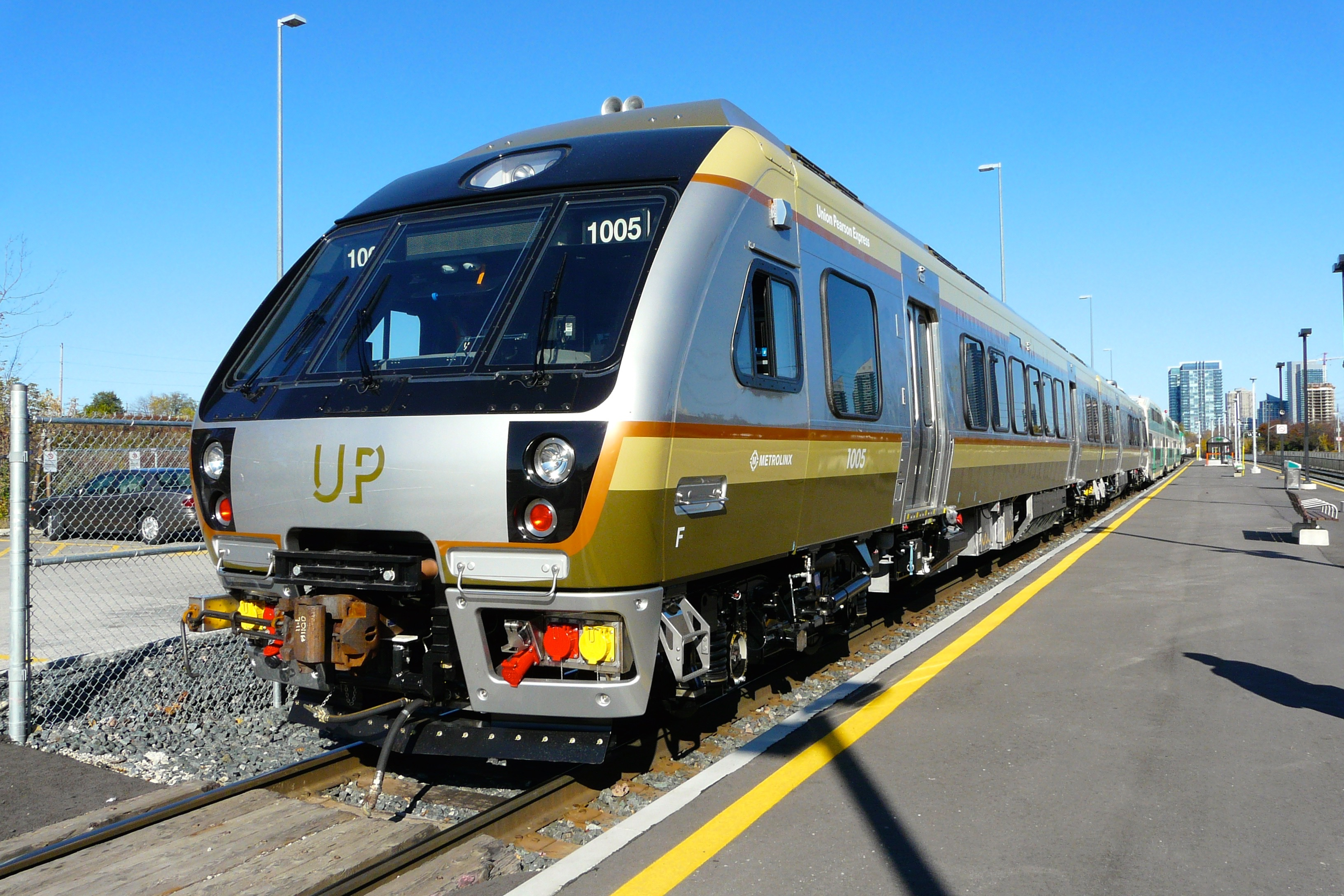
Union Pearson Express

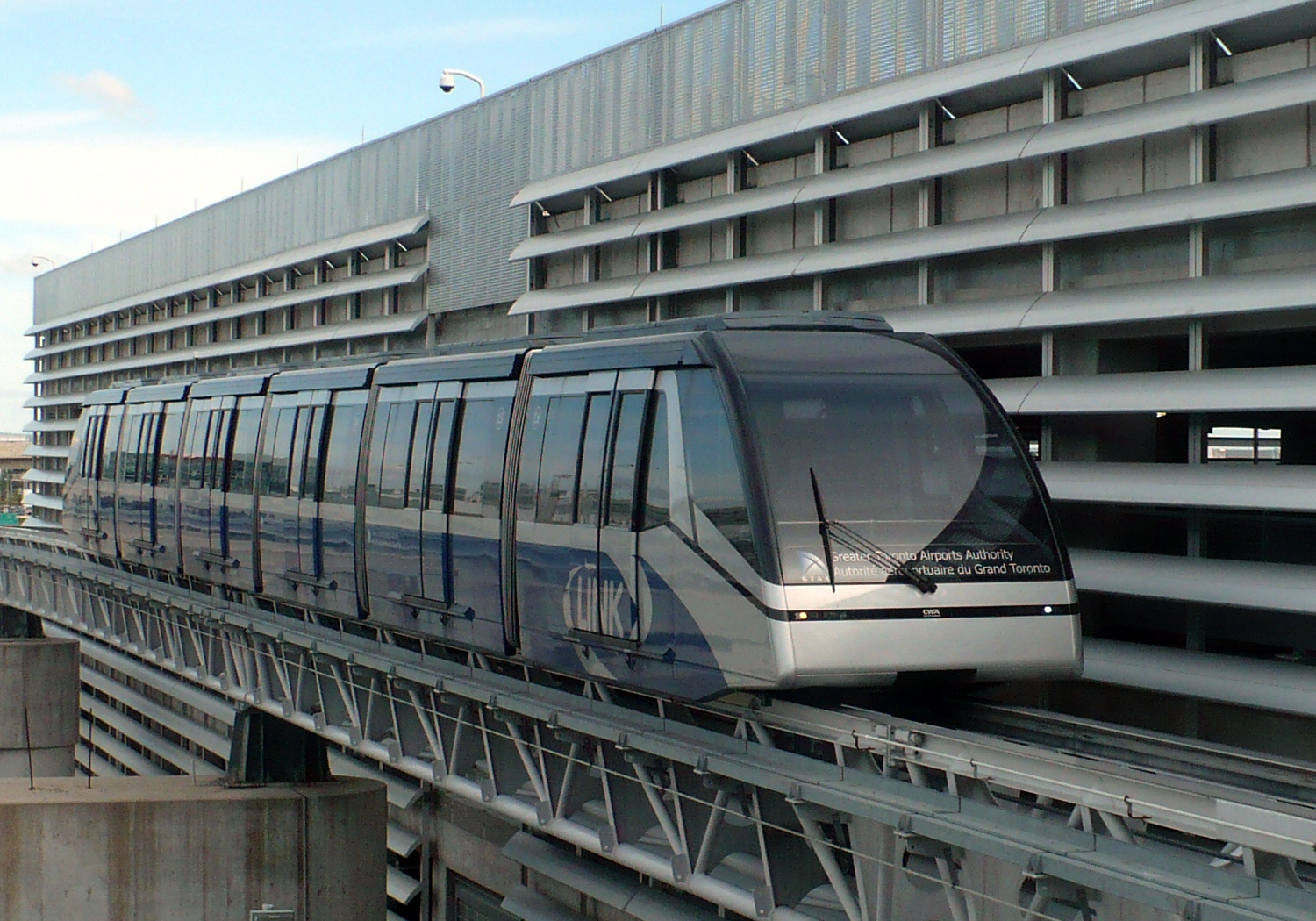
Terminal Link

Two train services have stops at the airport. The Union Pearson Express is an airport rail link that runs to Union Station in downtown Toronto, whereas the Terminal Link is a localized people mover (within airport property) formerly known as the Link Train.

==== Union Pearson Express ====
The Union Pearson Express (UP Express) is an airport rail link running between Pearson Airport and Union Station in Downtown Toronto, with intermediate stops at Weston, Mount Dennis, and Bloor GO Train stations. Trains depart every 15 minutes from Pearson Airport station and provide a 28-minute travel time to Union Station, the busiest intermodal transportation facility in Canada. Union Station offers connections to numerous GO Transit regional rail and bus services as well as inter-city rail links on Via Rail's Quebec City–Windsor Corridor. Combined UP Express and inter-city tickets may be purchased from Via Rail. The UP Express operates daily between 5:27 am and 12:57 am of the next calendar day.

==== Terminal Link ====
The Terminal Link (formerly the Link Train) is an automated people mover that facilitates inter-terminal transportation at Pearson Airport. It runs between Terminal 1, Terminal 3, and Viscount station located at the Viscount Value Park Lot. The Terminal Link train operates free daily, 24-hour service with trains departing all stations every 4 to 8 minutes.

=== Bus ===
==== Public transit ====
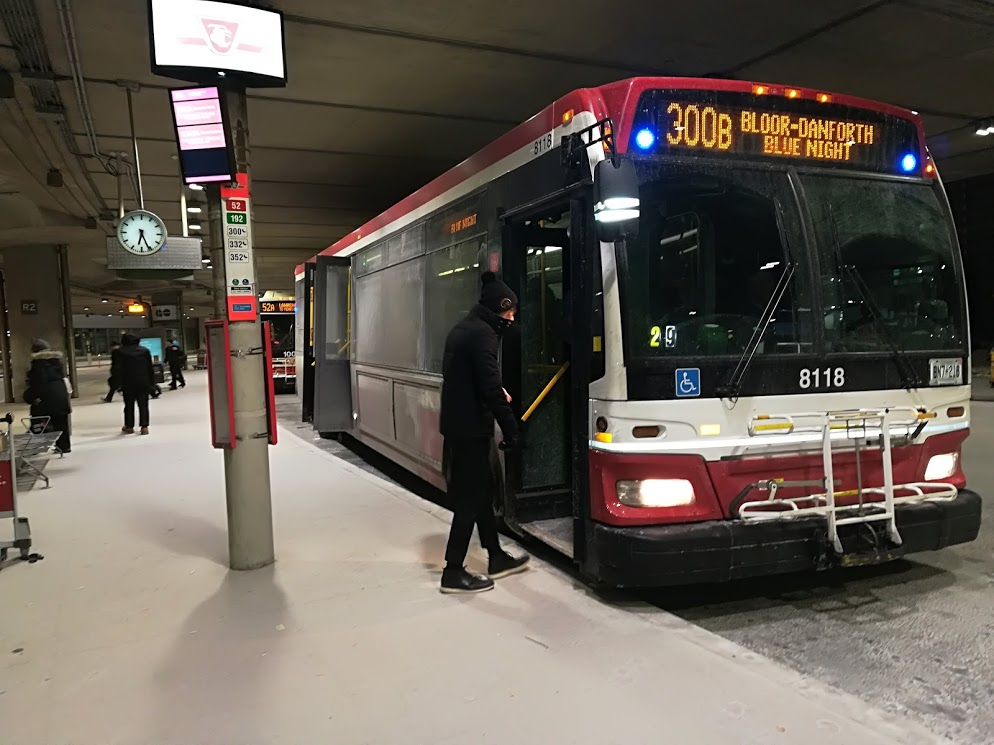
Blue Night Network Toronto Transit Commission bus at Terminal 1 in 2018

Several public transit bus services operate bus routes to Toronto Pearson International Airport. Toronto Transit Commission (TTC) operates daily, 24-hour public transit bus service from Pearson Airport to various subway stations in Toronto, with route 900 Airport Express being the main express bus service to the airport from Kipling station on Line 2 Bloor–Danforth of the Toronto subway, and route 52 Lawrence West / 352 Lawrence West Night / 952 Lawrence West Express operate service along Lawrence Avenue to Lawrence and Lawrence West stations on each leg of the subway's Line 1 Yonge–University. Additionally, route 900 Airport Express buses have a unique airport-themed livery and luggage racks. The TTC Blue Night Network operates local night bus routes to Warden Avenue in Toronto's east end via Bloor Street and Danforth Avenue, Eglinton station via Eglinton Avenue and Sunnybrook Hospital. TTC route 906 Airport-Humber College Express connects the airport at Viscount station of the Terminal Link with Line 6 Finch West LRT at Humber College station. Although the airport terminals and Viscount station are situated outside of the Toronto city limits, TTC bus services at Pearson Airport and Viscount station do not require a supplementary fare. With the exception of route 906, all TTC buses that serve the airport directly serve both Terminals 1 and 3.

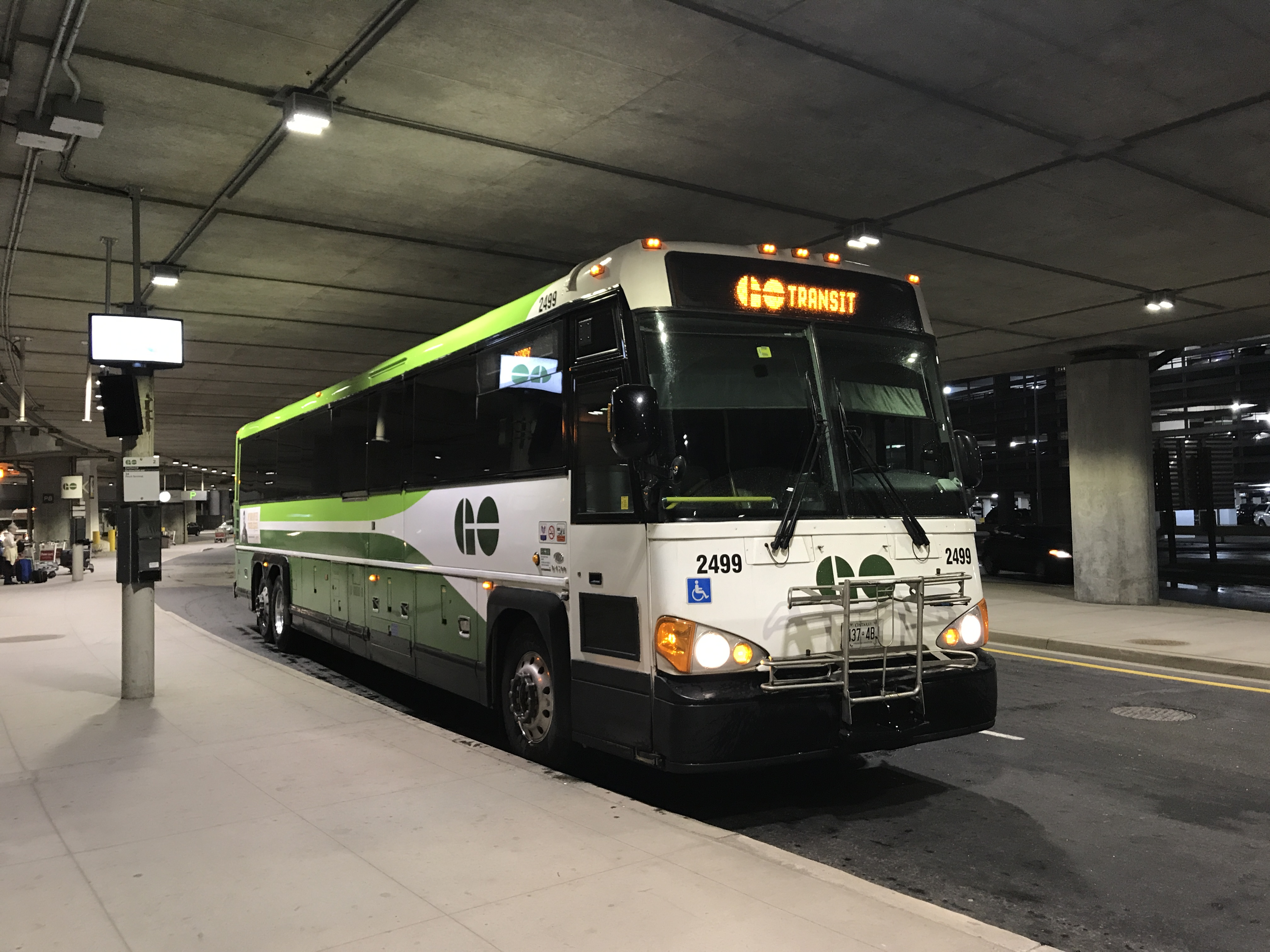
GO Transit bus outside Terminal 1, providing coach service to areas across the Greater Toronto Area

Two public transit operators based in Peel Region also operate routes to the airport: Brampton Transit and MiWay. Brampton Transit operates all-day public transit bus service from Pearson Airport to the city of Brampton, with express service operating to Bramalea Terminal. Brampton Transit buses arrive and depart from Terminal 1. MiWay operates all-day public transit bus service from Pearson Airport to the city of Mississauga, with express service to City Centre Transit Terminal, Humber College station, and Winston Churchill Transitway Station, and local routes to Westwood Square Terminal, Renforth station, and Meadowvale Town Centre Terminal. MiWay buses arrive and depart from Terminal 1, Terminal 3, Viscount, and the infield operations area of the airport.

GO Transit operates two 24-hour bus routes from the airport to cities across the Greater Toronto Area: route 40 to Richmond Hill Terminal and Hamilton GO Centre and route 94 to Pickering GO Station and Square One Bus Terminal. GO Transit coaches arrive and depart from Terminal 1.

==== Airline coaches ====
Operator	Destinations
Air Canada (operated by Landline)	Hamilton (ON), Kingston–Norman Rogers, Kitchener/Waterloo, Muskoka, Sarnia, St. Catharines/Niagara

Air Canada operates "land-air" motorcoach connection services between Pearson Airport and several nearby airports that are deemed too close geographically for regularly scheduled flights to be operated economically. The service provides ticketed Air Canada and other Star Alliance airline passengers with multiple daily non-stop ground connections between their respective departure/arrival airports and Terminal 1 at Pearson.

==== Other operators ====
The airport is served by several long-distance coach, van and minibus shuttle operators, which provide transportation from the airport to various municipalities and regional airports throughout Southern Ontario and to select cities and towns in the U.S. states of New York and Michigan.

Coach Canada's Megabus service provides bus service between Pearson Airport and Hamilton International Airport to the west as well as between Pearson Airport and destinations east of Toronto, such as Port Hope, Trenton, Belleville, Napanee, Kingston, and Cornwall.

=== Car ===
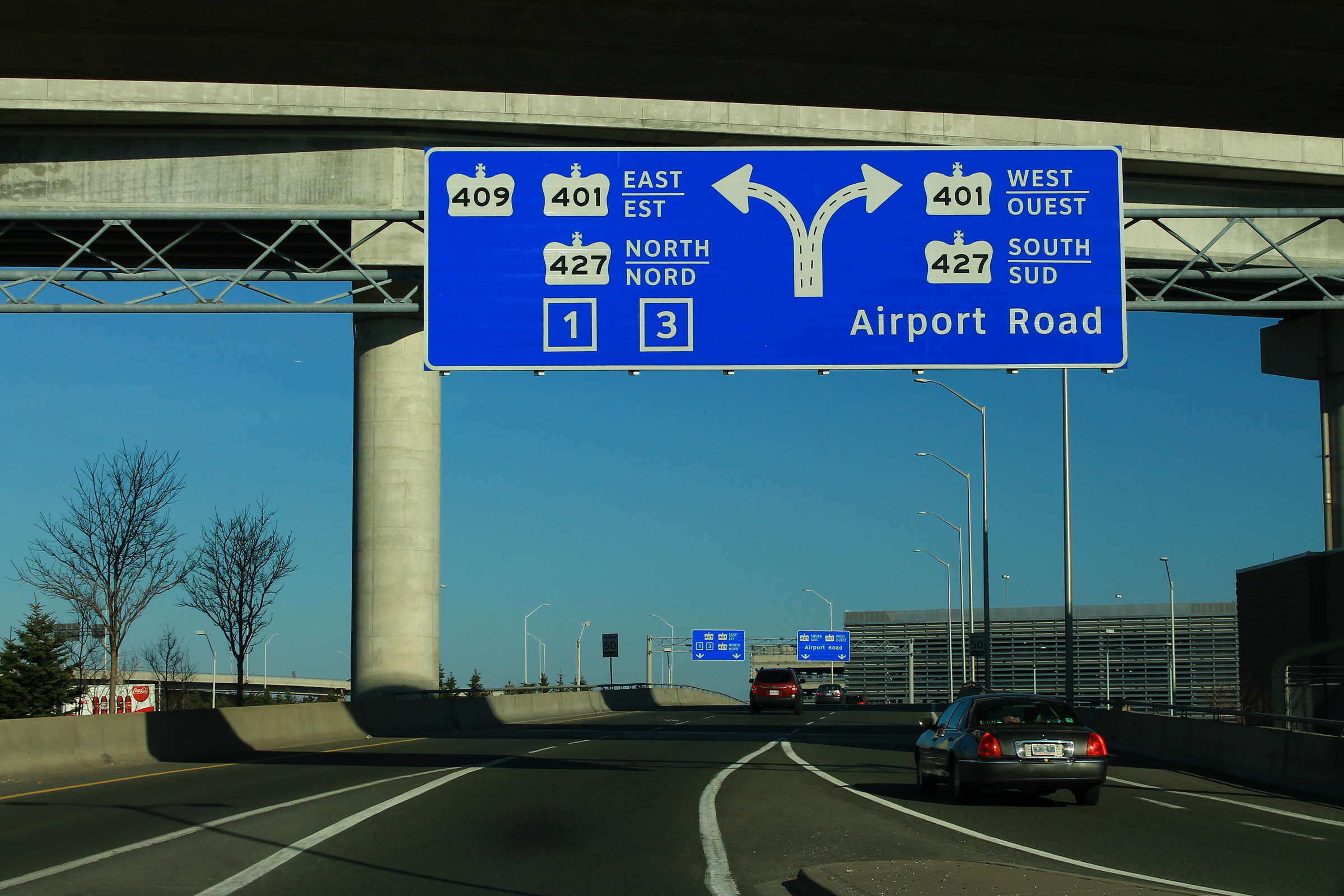
The roadway exiting the airport provides access to several 400-series freeways at a spaghetti junction.

Toronto Pearson is directly accessible from Highway 427 and Highway 409 with Airport Road and Dixon Road providing local access to the airport. There are 12,200 parking spaces available in parking garages adjacent to Terminal 1 and Terminal 3, in addition to several other parking lots located in the immediate area.

Car rentals are available from various major car rental agencies located in the parking garages adjacent to both terminals. Car rentals are also available from off-airport car rental agencies located near Viscount station, accessible from both terminals via the Terminal Link.

==== Taxi ====
Taxis and limousines can be accessed at designated taxi stands located outside of both Terminal 1 and Terminal 3. Only official airport-licensed taxis and limousines can legally pick up passengers at Toronto Pearson, and all airport-licensed taxi and limo companies use GTAA-authorized flat rate fares for travel from the airport.

==== Rideshare ====
Ridesharing services Uber and Lyft are available at Pearson Airport. Designated rideshare pickup zones are located at both Terminal 1 and Terminal 3. Terminal 1 pickup is from the ground level, while Terminal 3 pickup is from the arrivals level.

=== Future ===
In February 2017, the GTAA announced a proposed transit hub to be located across from Terminal 3 that would connect with Union Pearson Express and may connect with other transit lines extended to the airport. They include Line 5 Eglinton LRT of the Toronto subway and GO Expansion (formerly known as GO Transit Regional Express Rail). This proposal would eliminate the Terminal Link connecting Terminals 1 and 3 with a bridge from the transit hub to Terminal 3 and another bridge connecting Terminal 3 to Terminal 1.

Since 2020, Metrolinx has been planning the second phase of the Eglinton Crosstown west extension, which is a western extension of the under-construction Line 5 Eglinton to a proposed transit hub at Pearson Airport across the terminals at the site of Viscount station. The extension is scheduled to open in 2030–2031. As of 2020, the extension to Pearson Airport is under study by Metrolinx and the GTAA. The line will connect the airport to Midtown Toronto and Scarborough with additional transfers to downtown Toronto via Line 1 Yonge–University. Metrolinx is also studying a potential connection with Line 6 Finch West to the transit hub with additional transfers on Line 1 Yonge–University to York University and Vaughan Metropolitan Centre. Other connections, such as the Mississauga Transitway, which would connect the airport to Mississauga City Centre, are being studied.

== Statistics ==
=== Annual traffic ===
Annual passenger traffic at Toronto Pearson International Airport (2003 to present)
Year	Total passengers	% change	Domestic^{c}	% change	Transborder^{c}	% change	International^{c}	% change
2025	47,300,000	▲0.5%	17,200,000	▲0.8%	^{d}	^{d}	30,100,000	▼0.3%
2024	46,800,000	▲4.4%	16,400,000	▼0.6%	^{d}	^{d}	30,400,000	▲6.6%
2023	44,800,000	▲25.8%	16,500,000	▲15.3%	^{d}	^{d}	28,500,000	▲32.9%
2022	35,600,000	▲180.0%	14,300,000	▲111.5%	^{d}	^{d}	21,300,000	▲260.1%
2021	12,700,000	▼ -4.5%	6,800,000	▲24.4%	^{d}	^{d}	5,900,000	▲25.66%
2020	13,307,077	▼73.65%	5,449,924	▼70.39%	3,032,582	▼78.09%	4,824,571	▼73.56%
2019	50,499,431	▲2.0%	18,108,953	▲1.2%	13,847,414	▲1.9%	18,543,064	▲2.9%
2018	49,507,418	▲5.0%	17,860,337	▲2.2%	13,570,570	▲5.6%	18,076,511	▲7.6%
2017	47,130,358	▲6.3%	17,475,217	▲3.4%	12,855,891	▲6.6%	16,799,250	▲9.3%
2016	44,335,198	▲8.0%	16,906,560	▲6.6%	12,054,296	▲8.1%	15,374,342	▲9.6%
2015	41,036,847	▲6.4%	15,859,289	▲4.4%	11,154,435	▲6.2%	14,023,123	▲8.9%
2014	38,571,961	▲6.8%	15,192,126	▲5.6%	10,506,070	▲6.8%	12,874,220	▲8.3%
2013	36,107,306	▲3.4%	14,385,001	▲5.4%	9,838,121	▲3.9%	11,884,184	▲0.7%
2012	34,911,850	▲4.4%	13,646,163	▲4.3%	9,464,858	▲5.4%	11,800,829	▲3.7%
2011	33,435,277	▲4.7%	13,078,513	▲2.7%	8,979,103	▲4.1%	11,377,661	▲7.6%
2010	31,936,098	▲5.2%	12,730,680	▲0.1%	8,628,851	▲6.9%	10,576,567	▲10.6%
2009	30,368,339	▼ −6.0%	12,730,047	▼ −7.8%	8,074,027	▼ −8.3%	9,564,265	▼ −1.5%
2008	32,334,831	▲2.8%	13,812,866	▲0.5%	8,805,898	▼ −0.8%	9,716,067	▲10.1%
2007	31,446,199	▲2.1%	13,744,155	▲3.3%	8,879,180	▼ −0.3%	8,822,864	▲2.8%
2006	30,794,581	▲2.9%	13,309,531	▲3.1%	8,906,324	▲1.2%	8,578,726	▲4.6%
2005	29,914,750	▲4.5%	12,906,457	▲2.1%	8,803,505	▲4.5%	8,204,788	▲8.6%
2004	28,615,981	▲15.7%	12,636,748	▲14.6%	8,422,537	▲15.1%	7,556,696	▲18%
2003	24,739,312	––––	11,021,760	––––	7,316,287	––––	6,401,265	––––

Notes

- ^c: Before 2021, a distinction was made for operational and statistical purposes between "transborder" and "international" flights at Toronto Pearson, and at any other airport in Canada with United States border preclearance. A "transborder" flight was a flight between Canada and a destination in the United States, while an "international" flight was a flight between Canada and a destination that is not within the United States or Canada. A "domestic" flight is defined as a flight within Canada's borders only.
- ^d: As of 2021, "transborder" and "international" passenger statistics have been combined by the GTAA as "international".

== Accidents and incidents ==
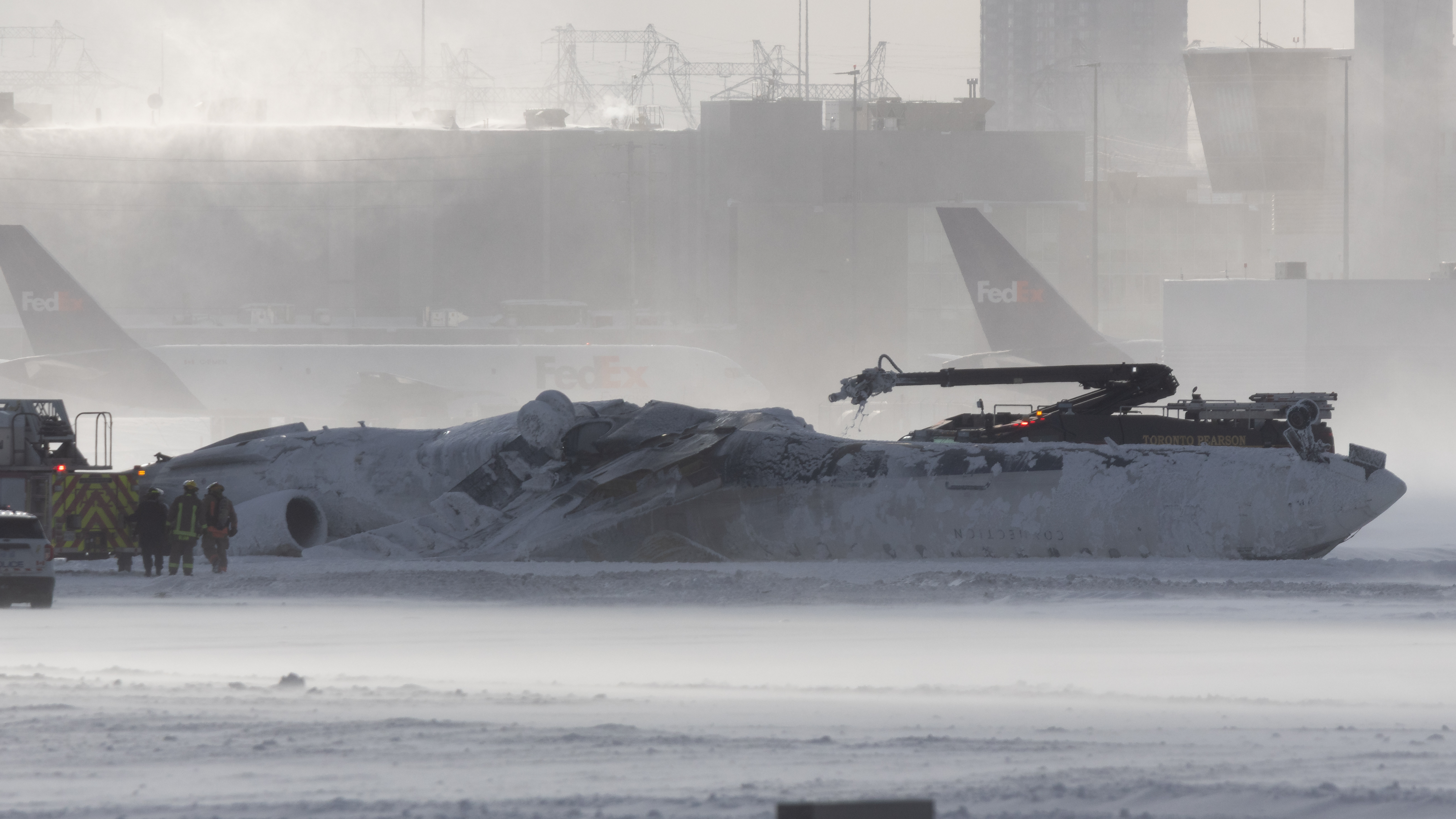
The overturned wreckage of Delta Connection Flight 4819 on the runway in 2025.

- The airport's deadliest accident occurred on July 5, 1970, when Air Canada Flight 621, a DC-8 jet, flew on a Montreal–Toronto–Los Angeles route. The pilots inadvertently deployed spoilers before the plane attempted landing, forcing the pilots to abort landing and takeoff. Damage to the aircraft that was caused during the failed landing attempt caused the plane to break up in the air during the go-around, killing all 100 passengers and nine crew members on board when it crashed into a field southeast of Brampton. Controversy remains over the cleanup effort following the crash, as both plane wreckage debris and human remains from the crash are still found on the site.
- On June 26, 1978, Air Canada Flight 189 to Winnipeg overran the runway during an aborted takeoff, and crashed into the Etobicoke Creek ravine. Two of the 107 occupants on board the DC-9 were killed.
- On July 9, 1981, a KF Cargo Howard 500, pitched nose up after takeoff, stalled, and crashed due to improper loading of parcels, exceeding the centre of gravity. All three crew members were killed.
- On January 11, 1983, a Sun Oil Co. North American Sabreliner crashed approximately 8 miles from runway 24R on an ILS approach to YYZ after descending steeply from the clouds and losing control, before crashing to the ground. All two crew members and three passengers died. Cause is unknown.
- On June 22, 1983, Douglas C-47A C-GUBT of Skycraft Air Transport crashed on takeoff roll at Toronto International Airport while on an international cargo flight from Cleveland Hopkins International Airport in northeastern Ohio. Both of the crew members were killed.
- On August 2, 2005, Air France Flight 358, an Airbus A340-300 (registration F-GLZQ) inbound from Paris, landed on runway 24L during a severe thunderstorm, failed to stop, and ran off the runway into the Etobicoke Creek ravine. It came to a stop next to busy Highway 401. In the ensuing fire, there were 12 serious injuries, but no fatalities. The investigation predominantly blamed pilot error when faced with severe weather conditions.
- On July 25, 2014, Sunwing Airlines Flight 772, which had taken off from Toronto bound for Scarlett Martínez International Airport, in Río Hato, Panama, was forced to return to Toronto after a passenger made a bomb threat; the plane was escorted back to Toronto by US Air Force planes. After it landed safely, the passenger was arrested and underwent a mental examination.
- On January 5, 2018, WestJet Flight 434, a 737-800, was struck by an inactive Sunwing aircraft, also a 737-800, being towed from the terminal. The plane caught fire, and the pilots ordered an evacuation. No serious injuries were reported. The Sunwing aircraft suffered significant damage.
- On May 10, 2019, Air Canada Flight 8615, a Bombardier DHC-8-300 (registration C-FJXZ), was struck by a fuel truck while taxiing on the tarmac. Five people were injured, and the plane was deemed a write-off.
- On March 7, 2020, two Air Canada aircraft were involved in a runway incursion. Air Canada Flight 1037, an Embraer E-190 (registration C-FMZW), was taking off from Runway 06L at Toronto when the takeoff was rejected due to a bird strike. An improper transponder showed the tower controller that the E-190 was airborne after 50 knots (93 km/h; 58 mph), and, therefore, sent an Air Canada Boeing 777-300 (registration C-FJZS), operating as Air Canada Flight 606, to depart. The pilots of the E-190 were transmitting on a frequency that they had rejected their takeoff due to a birdstrike, but at the same time, the pilots of the 777 were reading back their takeoff clearance. As the 777 was accelerating, the pilots observed that the Embraer-190 was still on the runway and initiated a rejected takeoff. A Nav Canada report stated that the use of this data by NAV Canada's runway incursion monitoring and conflict alert sub-system (RIMCAS) led to the inaccurate identification of the Embraer 190 and the Boeing 777 as in the air while these two aircraft were still on the ground. This resulted in late and inaccurate RIMCAS alerts and delayed the air traffic controller's response to the risk of collision.
- On April 17, 2023, a robbery occurred, with over $20 million worth of gold and other high-value items being stolen. A container was offloaded from a reported Air Canada aircraft during the evening hours and was unloaded under normal procedures. The cargo was taken to a holding facility before it was stolen. The goods were being handled by an American private security and protection company Brink's.
- On January 8, 2024, a man having a mental crisis boarded a Boeing 777 operated by Air Canada, and during the boarding process, tried to open the door of the plane, resulting in him falling onto the tarmac. He was injured and arrested.
- On February 17, 2025, Delta Connection Flight 4819, a Bombardier CRJ-900LR operated by Endeavor Air (registration N932XJ), crashed and flipped upside down while attempting to land on runway 23, injuring at least 21 of the 80 occupants aboard. The preliminary report indicates the rate of descent was -1100fpm and the First Officer was the pilot flying (PF). With 1.6 seconds to impact, the landing rate decreased to -1072fpm.

== In popular culture ==
A photograph taken by George Hunter of the original Terminal 1 (Aeroquay One) at Toronto Pearson International Airport is included on the Voyager Golden Record, carried on the Voyager 1 and Voyager 2 interstellar space probes.

=== Rush ===
Canadian rock trio Rush had an instrumental piece titled "YYZ," which is on their 1981 album Moving Pictures. Two of the band's members, Geddy Lee and Alex Lifeson, are natives of Toronto. The song, often requested by fans, was frequently played by the band in concert as an encore.

A VHF omnidirectional range system at the airport broadcasts the YYZ identifier code in Morse code, which the band once heard when Lifeson was flying them into the airport. The band's drummer, Neil Peart, said in interviews that the rhythm stuck with them. Peart and Lee have both said, "It's always a happy day when YYZ appears on our luggage tags."

The piece's introduction repeatedly renders "Y-Y-Z" in Morse code using various musical arrangements.

In 2023, a Rush-themed specialty bar opened in the airport's Terminal 1. The bar, Henderson Brewing@YYZ, is run by the craft brewery Henderson Brewery, based at the southern end of Junction Triangle in Toronto. It also features original Rush artifacts.

Rush also released a music video in 2022 of the band performing "YYZ" atop the CN Tower to mark the 40th anniversary of the release of Moving Pictures.

== See also ==
- List of airports in Ontario
- CFBN, former radio station operated by the airport that provided travel information
- List of airports in the Greater Toronto Area
- List of international airports by country
- World's busiest airports by cargo traffic
- World's busiest airports by international passenger traffic
- World's busiest airports by passenger traffic
- World's busiest airports by traffic movements
