= Union Pearson Express =

Airport rail link in Ontario, Canada

Coordinates: 43.677°N 79.470°W

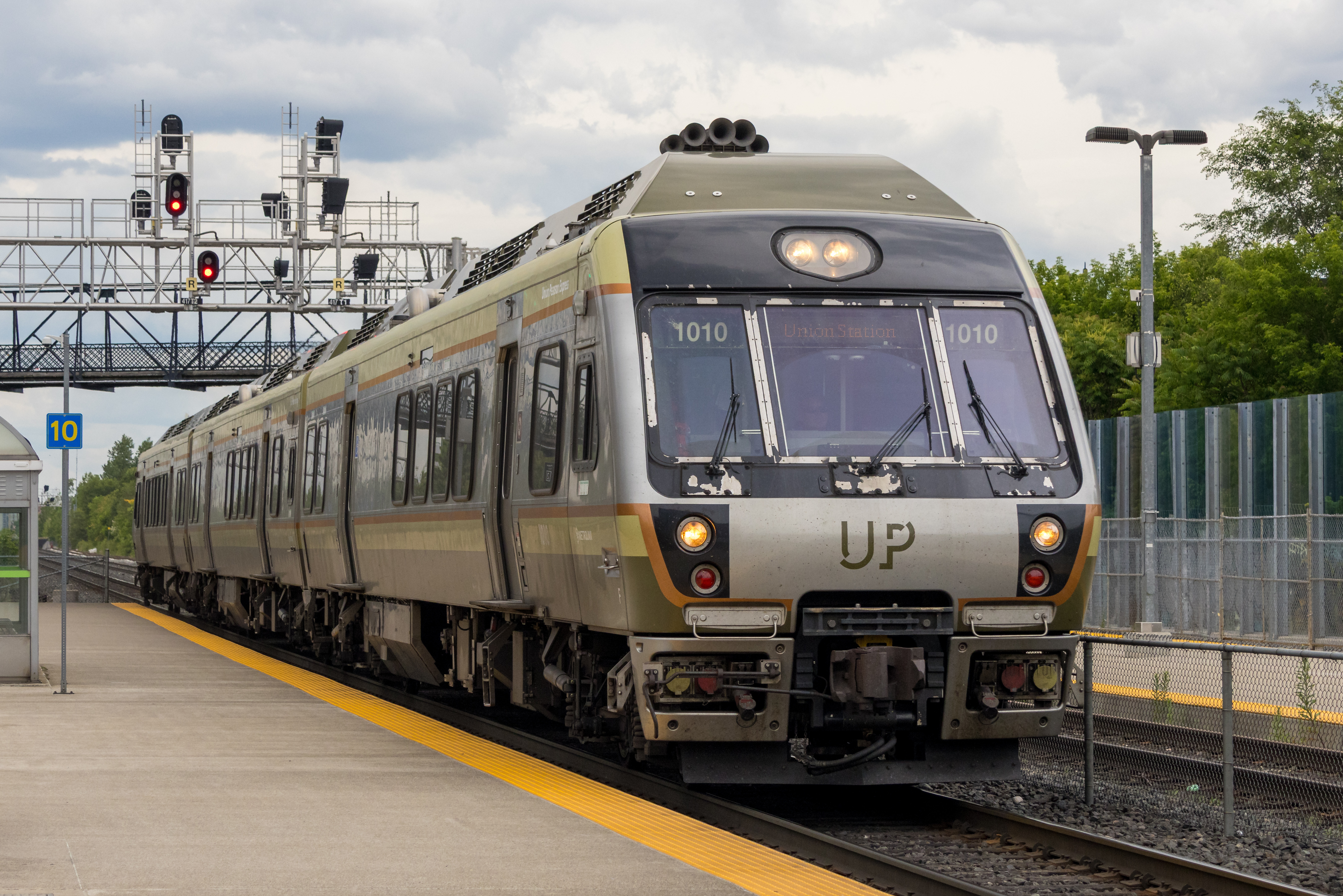
- A Nippon-Sharyo DMU at Bloor GO Station

Overview
- Service type: Airport rail link
- Status: Operational
- Locale: Greater Toronto
- First service: 6 June 2015; 11 years ago
- Current operator: Alstom (contracted by Metrolinx)
- Daily ridership: 12,000 average (2018–2019)
- Website: www.upexpress.com

Route
- Termini: Union; Pearson Airport
- Stops: 5 (1 under construction)
- Distance travelled: 23.3 km (14.5 mi)

Technical
- Rolling stock: Nippon Sharyo DMU
- Track gauge: 1,435 mm (4 ft 8 1/2 in) standard gauge
- Operating speed: 145 km/h (90 mph)
- Track owner: Metrolinx

The Union Pearson Express (UP Express or simply UP) is an airport rail link connecting Union Station in downtown Toronto to Toronto Pearson International Airport. The UP Express began operation on 6 June 2015, in time for the 2015 Pan American Games. The UP Express travels between Union and Pearson in 28 minutes departing every 15 minutes, seven days a week. At the launch announcement, it was stated that the UP Express was projected to carry 2.35 million passengers annually and eliminate approximately 1.2 million car trips in the first year. As of 2019, it carried 4.5 million passengers annually.

The UP Express is operated as an independent division of Metrolinx, similarly to GO Transit. An airport rail link was one of the priority projects identified in Metrolinx's regional transportation plan, The Big Move. Construction began in 2011 as part of the Georgetown South Project, which expanded the rail corridor the UP Express shares with GO Transit and Via Rail. UP Express uses diesel multiple unit (DMU) trains that meet United States Environmental Protection Agency Tier 4 emission standards. Metrolinx plans to electrify the UP Express along with the Kitchener line, as well as use a unified train set with the rest of the GO network, although as of 2019, the project was still in its early stages. The UP Express has been criticized for not using electric trains from the outset, and for its initial fare prices that were very high compared with other North American airport–city connections.

The Union Pearson Express' maximum operating speed is 145 km/h (90 mph), and its average speed is 56 km/h (35 mph). The line initially operated with four stations but a fifth was added in November 2025.

== History ==
=== Early proposals ===
Improved transit connections to Pearson Airport had been of interest since the late 1980s. Before pursuing the airport rail link, three formal studies were conducted, in 1989, 1990 and 1991. The last two presented options for either making a connection from the GO Georgetown (later extended and renamed Kitchener) train line or the Toronto Transit Commission's Bloor–Danforth line (since renamed "Line 2 Bloor–Danforth").

=== SNC-Lavalin era ===
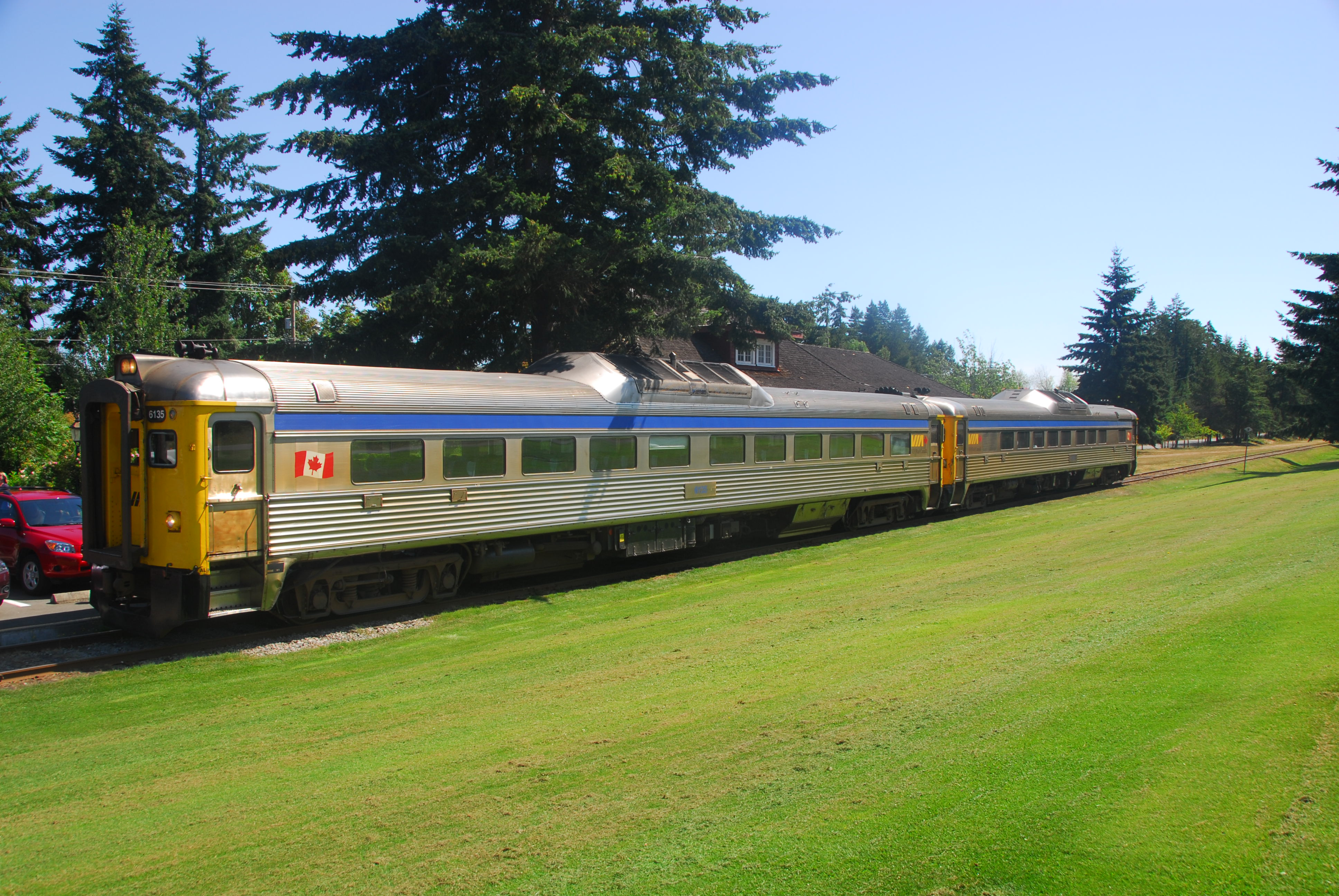
The original Blue22 service proposed by SNC-Lavalin would have used refurbished Budd Rail Diesel Cars. Pictured are two cars used by Via Rail.

Transport Canada made a request for proposal for an airport rail link in April 2001. In May 2003, the bidding parties were shortlisted to four consortia, who were invited to submit business cases. On 13 November 2003, the Union Pearson AirLink Group, a subsidiary of SNC-Lavalin, was selected to finance, design, construct, operate and maintain an airport rail link. The service was to be called Blue22, as a trip would take 22 minutes to or from Pearson with a stop at the Bloor GO Station (within walking distance of the Dundas West Toronto Transit Commission station). Trains were to be refurbished Budd Rail Diesel Cars and were expected to begin running between 2008 and 2010.

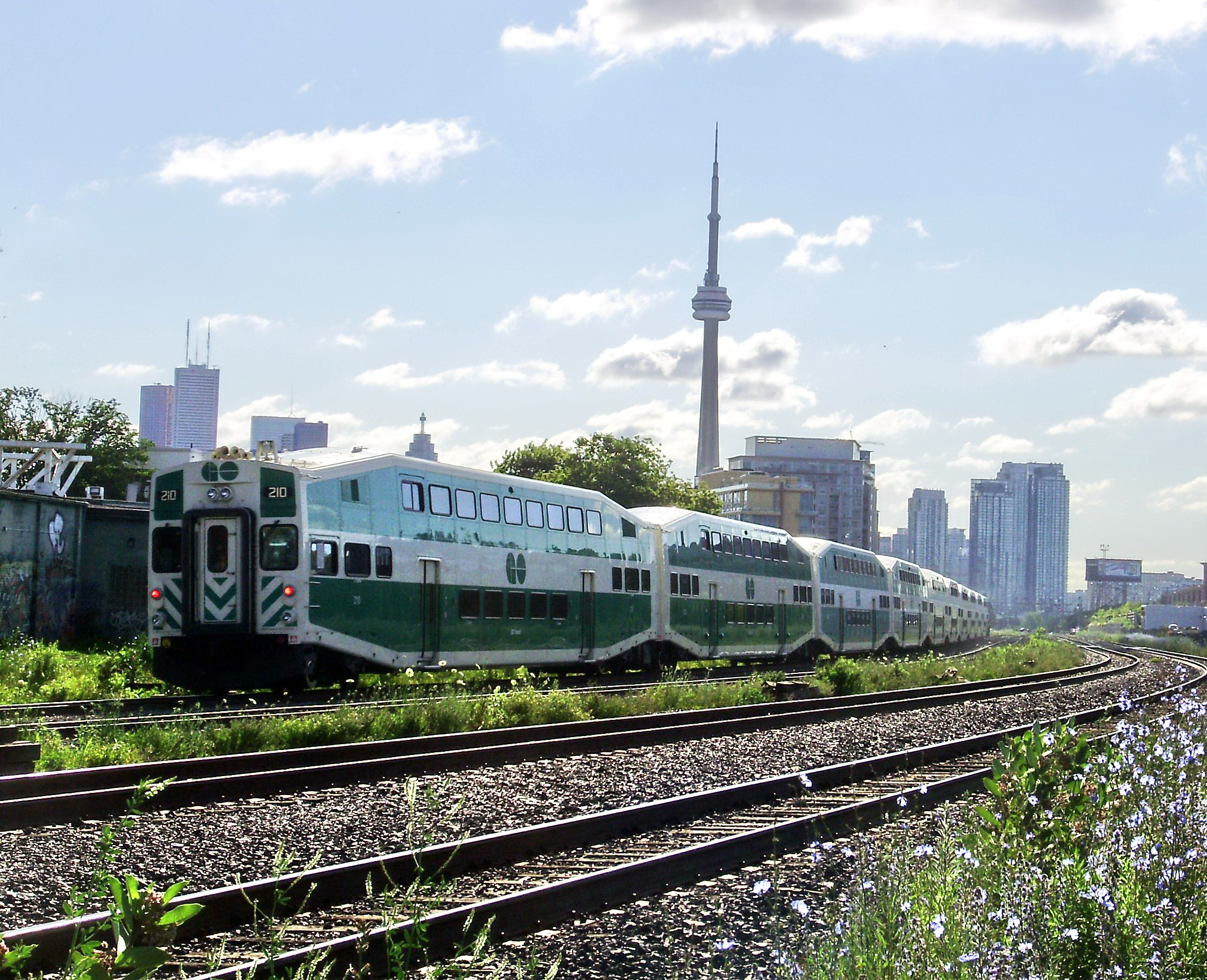
A GO Train operating along the Kitchener line. The UP Express project is combined with the Georgetown South Project, which is improving the infrastructure along the line for future GO Train service and the UP Express.

By 2008, there had not been significant progress on the project because of failed consensus in negotiations, regulatory hurdles and community opposition. In June 2008, the Ontario government revised the environmental assessment process from a required three-year period to six months, and later that summer it resumed negotiations with Union Pearson AirLink Group on terms for a public-private partnership. Furthermore, the high-speed link received public statements of strong support from Premier of Ontario Dalton McGuinty, Toronto Mayor David Miller and the federal government.

In November 2008, Metrolinx, the Ontario government agency for Greater Toronto and Hamilton transportation, released its regional transportation plan titled The Big Move, outlining how an airport rail link was part of a strategy to establish multi-directional high-order transit connectivity to the Pearson Airport district, in addition to the Mississauga Transitway, rapid transit corridors along Highways 427 and 407, and light rail transit lines along Eglinton and Finch Avenues. In December 2008, Metrolinx became the proponent of new EA that would simultaneously assess a combination of both the UP Express and GO Transit's Georgetown South expansion. The final Environmental Project Report was released on 30 July 2009.

=== Metrolinx takeover ===
After two years of failed negotiations and financing difficulties, the public-private partnership between Ontario and the Union Pearson AirLink Group was called off in July 2010, and Metrolinx was handed responsibility to directly own and operate the service. Metrolinx established the new operating division that would become Union Pearson Express. Until November 2012, when the official name was announced, the name "Air Rail Link" was used as a placeholder name; "UPX" was an occasionally used acronym.

Metrolinx largely preserved the same project scope as had been approved in the environmental assessment, with the service designed for air travellers rather than for conventional commuters. Changes from SNC Lavalin's former proposal included refinements to take into account synergies with GO Transit. Metrolinx engaged Sumitomo Corporation of America to supply Diesel Multiple Units (DMUs) for the line. Kathy Haley was named the first president of the division in July 2011.

=== Construction ===
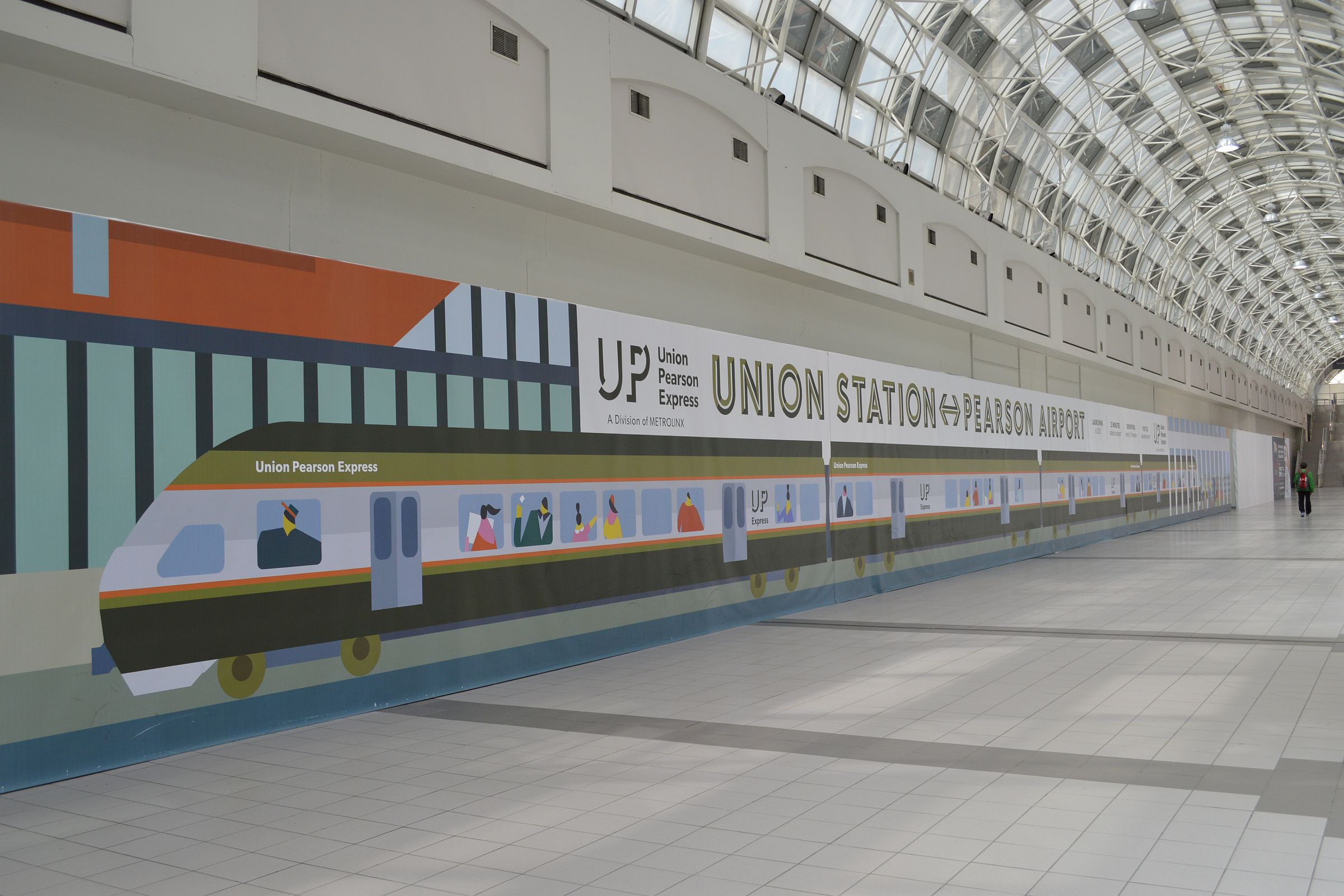
Station construction in the SkyWalk beside Union Station in downtown Toronto.

In October 2011, the consortium AirLinx Transit Partners was selected to complete building the UP Express. The consortium was made up of some of Canada's largest construction companies such as Aecon and Dufferin Construction. Construction on the spur line and passenger station at Pearson airport began in the spring of 2012, at a cost of $128.6 million. At the time, the entire project was expected to cost $456 million.

Undertaken as part of the Georgetown South Project, the work consisted of five new road overpasses and two road underpasses, one railway grade separation, one bridge reconstruction and the widening of 15 other bridges, construction or re-construction of four stations, major track and grading construction, signal installations utility relocations, as well as the new 3.3-kilometre (2.1 mi) elevated spur to and from the airport. The work was conducted while minimizing disruption to existing train operations, local residents and businesses. A new rail tunnel under Highway 401 was still required at a later date to meet future ridership demands. Construction of tunnels for two tracks began in July 2019 and is expected to be completed in late 2021.

=== Initial operation ===
Service began on 6 June 2015, operated by the Union Pearson Express division of Metrolinx. With an adult one-way fare of $27.50 cash or $19.00 with a Presto card, the service was criticized for being the most expensive airport rail link service in North America. Amid public concern, fares were drastically reduced on 9 March 2016 to $12.00 cash and $9.00 with a Presto card. The change also introduced GO pricing between Bloor, Weston, and Union stations. President Kathy Haley, who was heading up the project, stepped down on 31 March 2016, in a shakeup of the ranks that resulted in changes to the line's management approach.

In 2017, the Discounted Double Fare program was introduced, which offered UP Express and GO Transit customers a discount of $1.50 when transferring to or from the Toronto Transit Commission (TTC), equal to a 50 percent reduction of the $3.00 TTC cash fare at the time. The arrangement ended in March 2020 when the Government of Ontario terminated funding for the program.

On 16 November 2025, a fifth station at Mount Dennis opened.

== Service ==
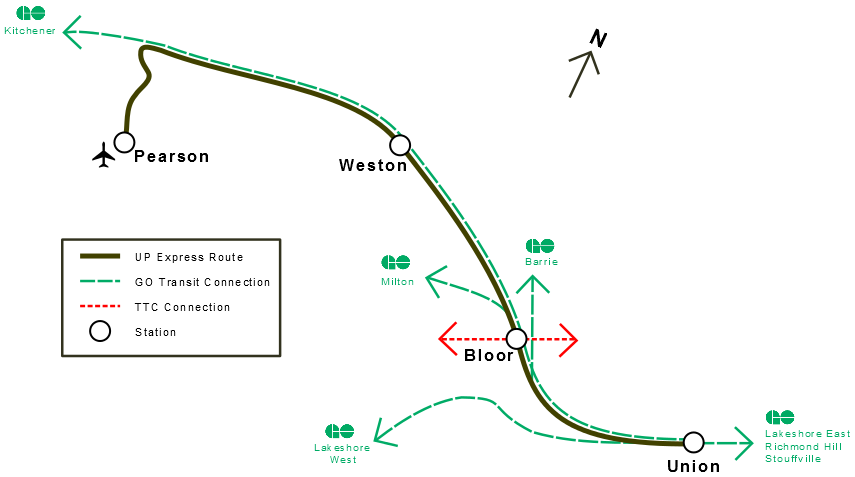
Map of the Union Pearson Express route prior to the opening of Mount Dennis in 2025.

Union Pearson Express operates every 15 minutes between 4:55 am (6:00 am on weekends) and 1:00 am, making approximately 80 trips per day.

=== Route ===
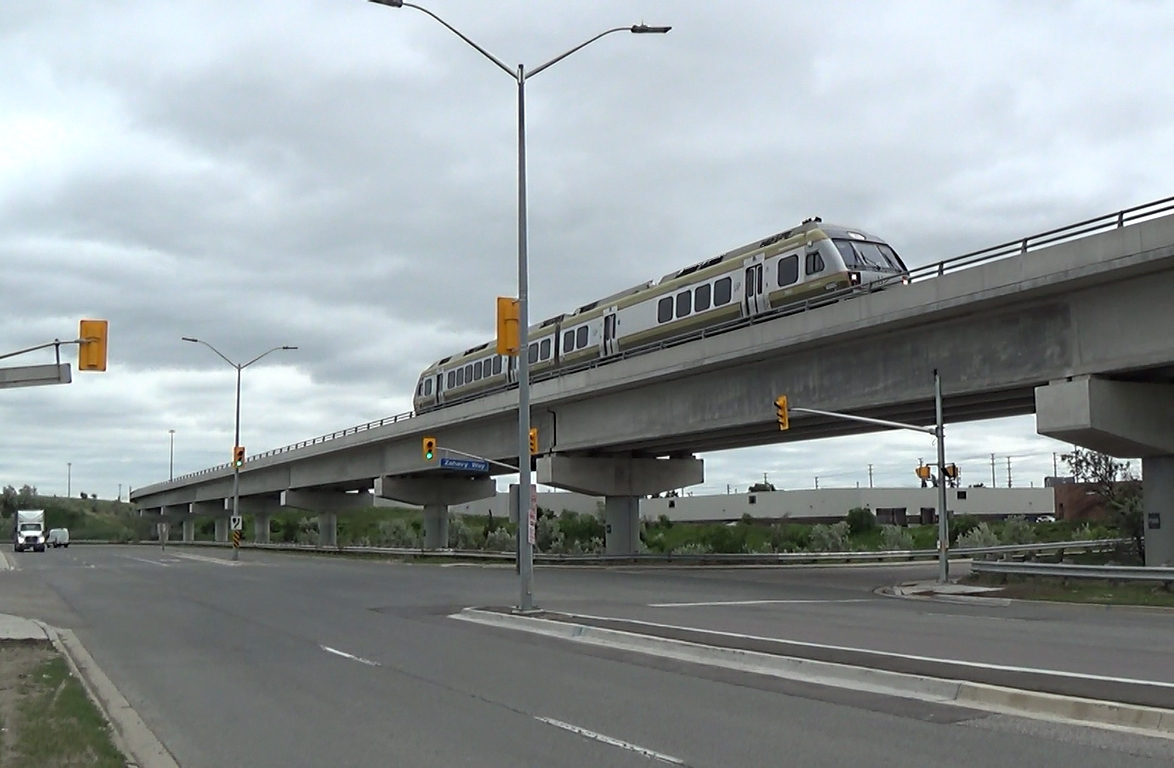
The elevated track structure of the UP Express along Goreway Drive in Mississauga

From Union Station, the UP Express heads northwest along the existing GO Transit Kitchener line. This 22-kilometre (14-mile) section of track between Bathurst Street and Highway 427 was upgraded as part of GO's Georgetown South Project, which improved infrastructure along the route to accommodate the UP Express, GO Transit, Canadian National, and Via Rail services. The UP Express makes three intermediate stops at Bloor, Mount Dennis, and Weston GO stations. Bloor station was redesigned for better access and connection to GO Transit, and Metrolinx is constructing a direct connection to the Dundas West subway station.

Beyond Highway 427, a newly constructed 3.3 km (2.1 mi) rail spur carries the UP Express from the Kitchener line to the airport, forming the longest elevated rail line in Ontario. The elevated spur to Pearson Airport reaches a maximum height of 28 metres (92 feet), offering a view of the Downtown Toronto and Mississauga City Centre skylines. At Pearson, the UP Express arrives at Terminal 1, where riders can transfer to the airport's Terminal Link people mover to connect with Terminal 3 and the Viscount parking garage.

=== Stations ===
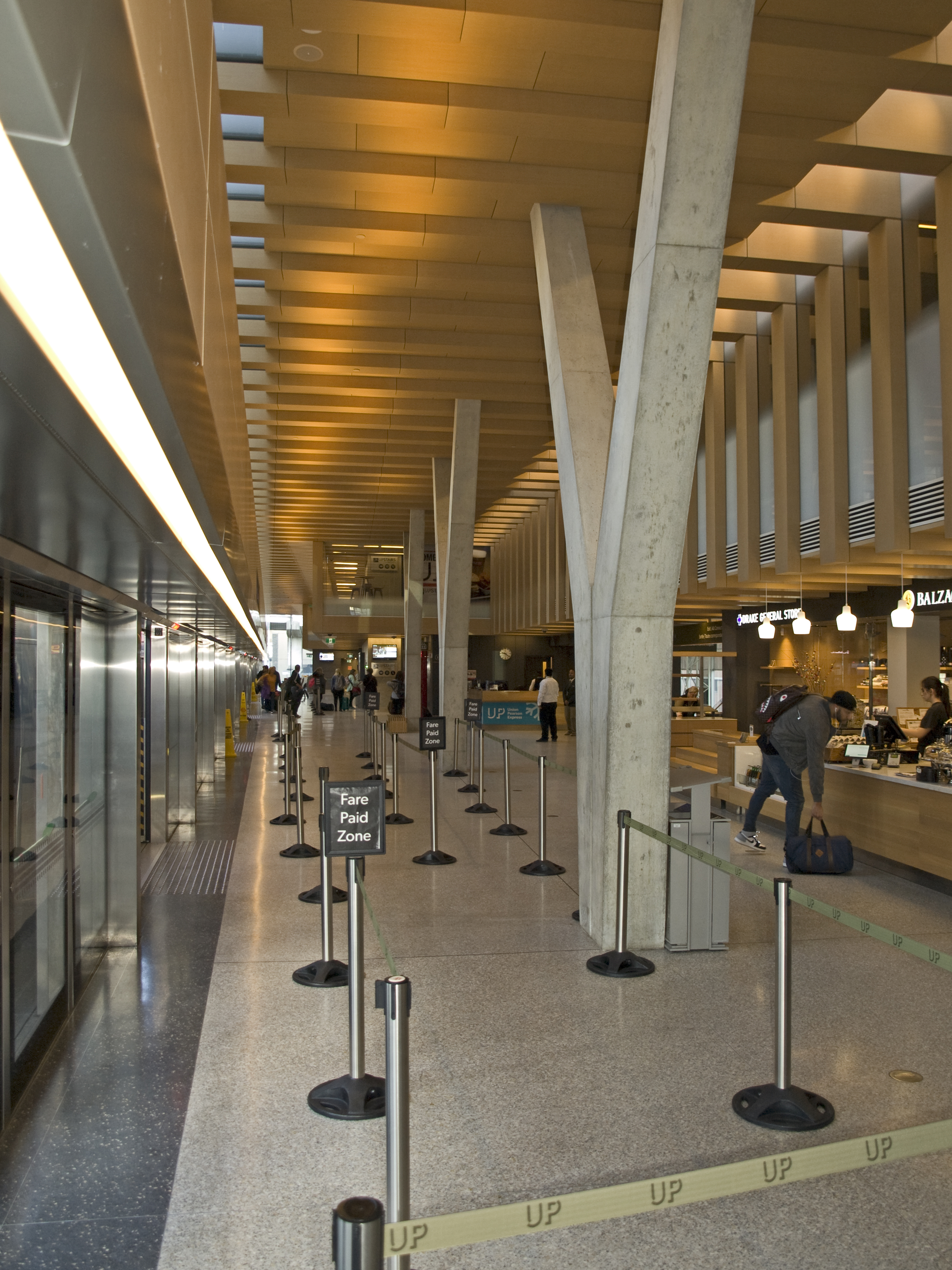
UP Express platform at Union Station

At Toronto Union Station, UP Express operates from a dedicated platform in the station's west wing along the SkyWalk. The platform is fully enclosed and features a waiting area, a guest services desk, café, gift shop, and lounge.

At Bloor, Mount Dennis, and Weston stations, UP Express operates from dedicated high-level platforms adjacent to the GO Transit Kitchener line low-level platforms.

Woodbine GO Station, which is under construction, will also service UP Express when completed.

Station name	Distance		Connections
Station name	Between stations	From Pearson Airport	Connections
Pearson Airport	—N/a	—N/a	Pearson Airport; Terminal Link
Weston	11.1 km (6.9 mi)	11.1 km (6.9 mi)	TTC
Mount Dennis	2.4 km (1.5 mi)	13.5 km (8.4 mi)	TTC
Bloor	4.5 km (2.8 mi)	18.0 km (11.2 mi)	(via Dundas West station); TTC
Union	5.3 km (3.3 mi)	23.3 km (14.5 mi)	TTC

=== Rolling stock ===
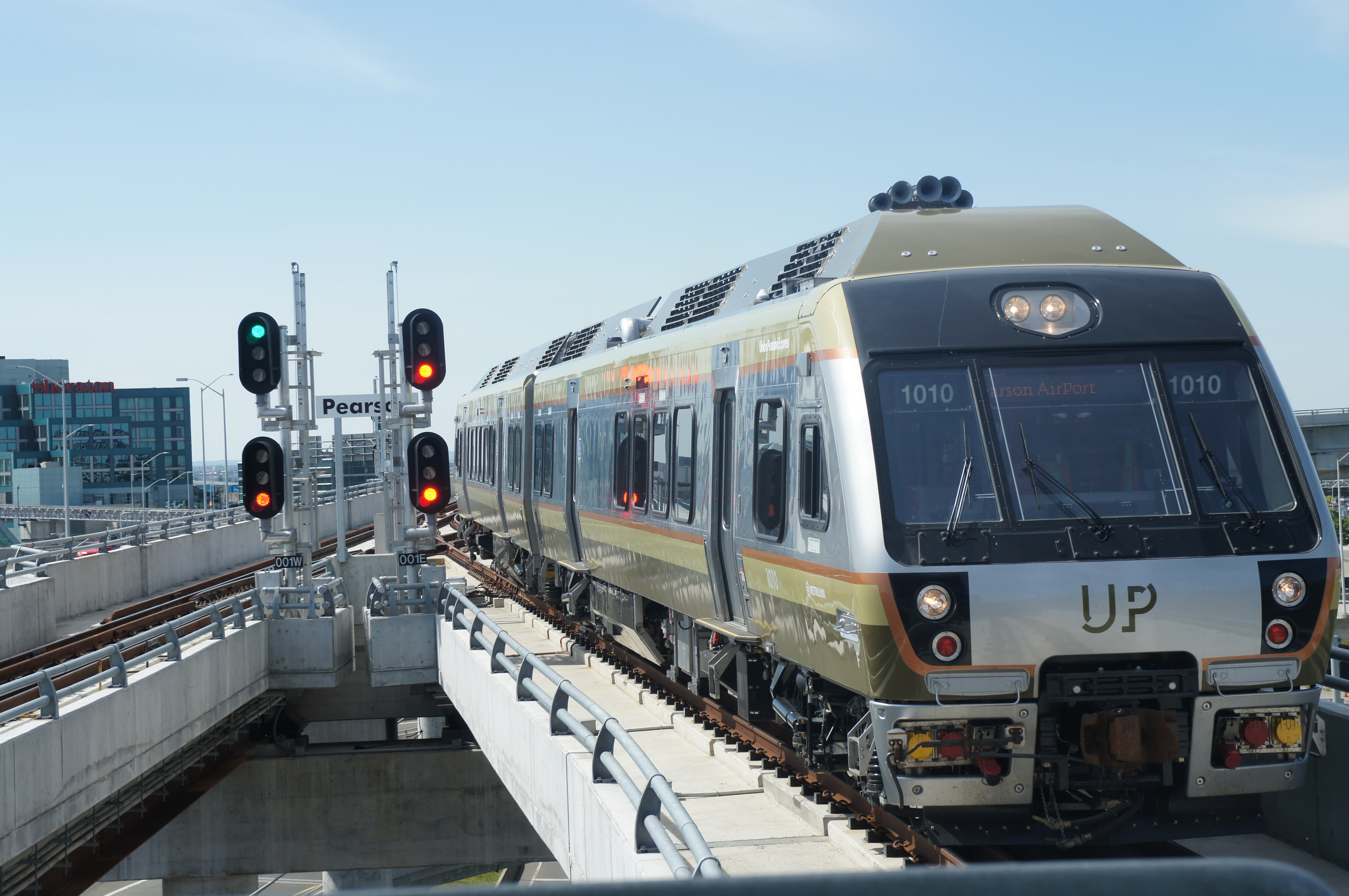
A UP Express train approaches Pearson Station

The Union Pearson Express uses Nippon Sharyo DMU trains. The fleet consists of 18 diesel multiple unit (DMU) cars, as four three-car and three two-car sets. Initially, on 1 March 2011, Metrolinx announced that it had chosen to buy 12 DMU cars (six two-car trains) from Nippon Sharyo at a cost of $53 million, for the service. This was later expanded to 18 DMU cars (adding one car to each train via an option order). This brought the cost to US$75 million. The DMUs were manufactured in Japan, assembled in Nippon Sharyo's facility in Rochelle, Illinois, and towed by rail to Toronto, with the first trainset arriving on 15 August 2014.

Interior view of a coach

The trainsets seat between 115 and 173 people. On-board features include power outlets, Wi-Fi, luggage facilities, and washrooms.

The UP Express DMUs are based on the design created for the Sonoma–Marin Area Rail Transit system in California. Powered by a diesel hydraulic drive with a six-speed automatic transmission and regenerative braking, the DMUs are believed to be the first trains in the world that comply with the United States Environmental Protection Agency Tier 4 emission standards, which will reduce emissions up to 90%. Braking energy is converted into electricity by the auxiliary power generator, and helps to provide onboard lighting and heating. They also comply with FRA Tier 1 crash energy management features. Modifications for UP Express use include enclosed overhead luggage bins that comply with Transport Canada rules and an enhanced enclosed luggage tower.

=== Environmental impact ===
The Tier 4 engines produce substantially lower emissions than most other diesel vehicles in Toronto. The Environmental Impact Assessment for the UP Express of 2009 was carried out assuming that trains would be Tier 3 standard rather than Tier 4, and showed that at peak frequency the air quality effect of the additional trains would not raise any pollution level above the provincial criterion levels. The 2010 Metrolinx electrification study, which did assume the use of Tier 4 emissions technologies for diesel propulsion options, found that the Georgetown–UP Express diesel service would contribute on the order of 0.2% to local air pollution, and that electrification would result in only a small improvement to local air quality. In an additional review of human health assessment in 2011, GO Transit examined the current plan for Tier 4 emission controls on both the UP Express trains and conversion of existing GO locomotives to Tier 4 and found that the human health risks of the diesel UP Express service are negligible, but that current background air quality (from other pollution sources in Toronto) is an issue.

=== Fares and ridership ===
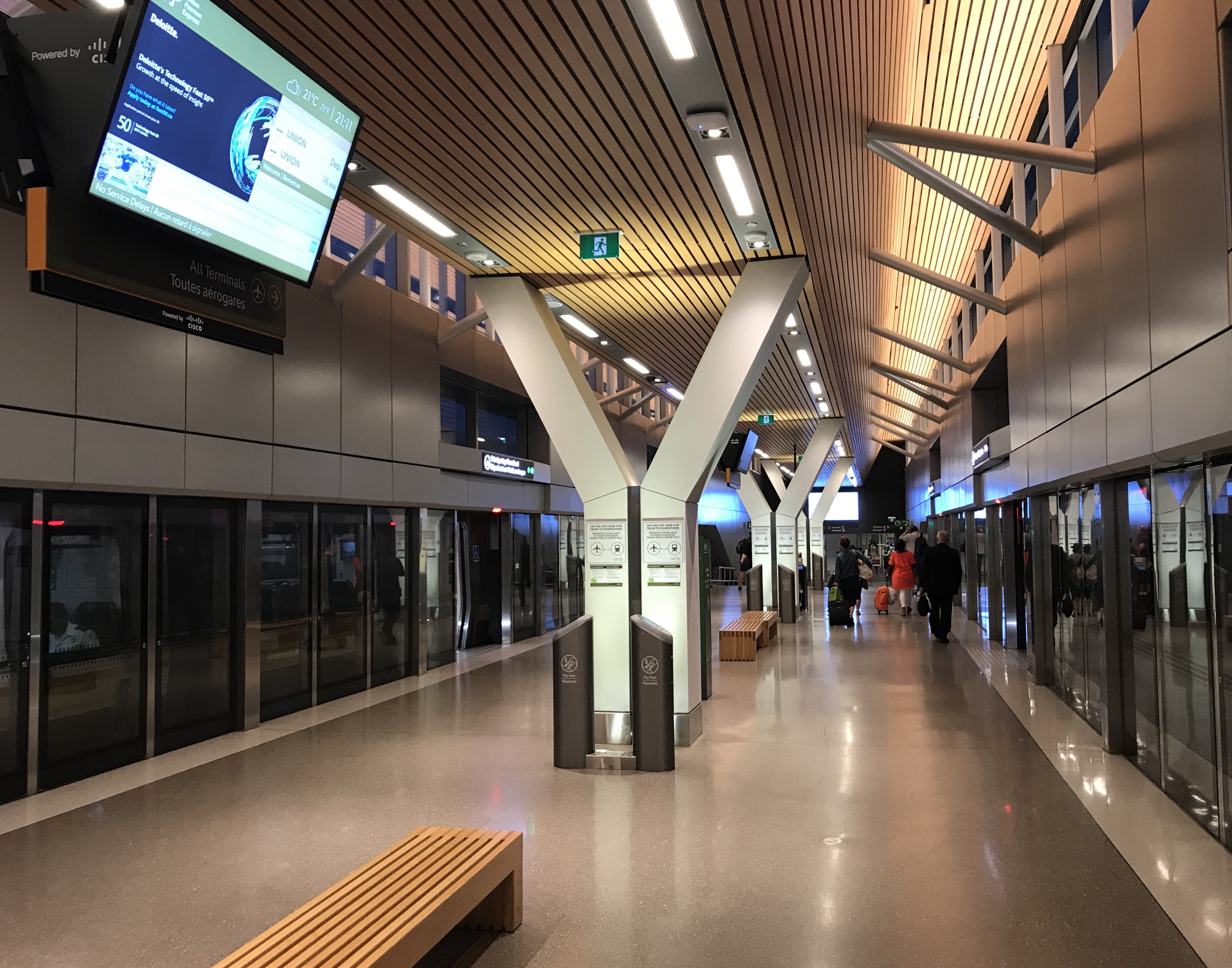
The UP Express platform at Pearson Airport station

Fares are based on age, origin and destination, and the method of payment (children ages 12 and under can ride UP Express for free year-round). Discounts are available for families, round trips, and airport staff. As with other GO Transit lines, integrated train tickets can be purchased through Via Rail to railway stations across Canada. Upon launch, one-way fares on the UP Express between were $27.50, or $19 with a Presto card. By 19 June 2015, the Union Pearson Express was averaging about 3,250 riders a day, or 12 percent capacity. Metrolinx has projected that a year after opening, the service will attract 5,000 riders a day — about 1 million customers. By 2020, Metrolinx expects about 2.46 million rides per year will bring it up to full operating cost recovery.

The UP Express uses an honour-based proof-of-purchase system, in which customers must carry a pre-purchased UP ticket or tapped-in Presto card, contactless credit or debit card, or mobile wallet while on board the train(s); these fare media must be presented for inspection upon request. Failure to do so can result in a fine.

Annual ridership per fiscal year
Year	Passengers
2016/2017	2.76 million
2017/2018	3.5 million
2018/2019	4.5 million
2021/2022	0.825 million
2022/2023	2.57 million

However, ridership declined in the service's opening months. Ridership in August 2015 was 17 percent lower than in June 2015 and a further 4 percent lower in the first two weeks of September. Ridership ended up averaging 2,300 per day during a four-week period in September 2015, a drop of 29 percent since June. The service needed about 7,000 riders per day to break even on operating costs. A report in February 2016 showed a drop in monthly ridership from the summer to 65,593 rides (just over 2,100 per day) in November 2015. This led Metrolinx to start considering price adjustments to boost ridership numbers.

By January 2016, average ridership slumped further to 1,967 passengers per day. Fares were reduced on 9 March 2016 to $12 for a one-way trip between Union and Pearson, or $9 with a Presto card. On the first day of reduced fares, staff counted 5,300 boardings with 40 per cent of the riders being first-time UP users, 83 per cent being air travelers and 17 per cent being commuters. By June 2016, the daily average ridership had risen to 7,657, and a new record was set on 29 July, when the service carried more than 11,000 passengers. However, the fare reduction has lowered the total revenue collected by the UP Express, which is expected to be below what is required for its operating costs. It was revealed that since opening day to March 2016, the UP Express' provincial operating subsidy totaled $39.3 million or about $52.26 per ride.

In July 2018, the most recent month for which ridership data is available, the UP Express carried approximately 356,000 passengers. From July to September 2022, the UP Express carried approximately 719,000 passengers.

On 11 March 2021, UP Express became the first transit agency in the Greater Toronto Area to launch the new Presto open payment system. Riders have the option to tap on and off using a credit card (Visa, Mastercard or American Express), Interac debit card or a mobile device (mobile phone or watch) on a Presto fare device, in addition to tapping a Presto card.

== Public opposition and legal challenges ==
Residents living along the Weston section of the route have objected to alterations to accommodate the GO Georgetown South corridor improvements and the addition of UP Express trains. Concerns include the division of Weston from the closing of level crossings, noise levels, air quality and property values. In April 2009, the Clean Train Coalition (CTC), representing the communities along the rail corridor, formed to put pressure on Metrolinx and the province to immediately prioritize electrification of the densely populated Georgetown South corridor and Union-Pearson Rail Link on opening day. However, both the province and Metrolinx Chairman Rob Prichard have indicated that using diesel trains is the only way to prevent significant delays. "We believe the Greater Toronto Area needs this project as fast as possible, and that means going with the cleanest diesel technology in the world," stated Prichard.

In August 2012, the CTC took legal action against Metrolinx by submitting an application for judicial review. The application requested "quashing and setting aside any decision to implement or run Diesel Multiple Units along the Air Rail Link", on the basis that by taking direction from the Ontario government to complete the UP Express in time for the Pan American Games, a proper analysis between operating diesel and electric trains was not completed, running contrary to Metrolinx's legislated mandate. It also asserted that another review of air quality was warranted due to the World Health Organization's (WHO) reclassification of diesel exhaust as a carcinogen.

Saba Ahmad, the lawyer representing the CTC, described the application as a test of whether government agencies must obey their own legislation. On 21 November 2012, the Ontario Divisional Court turned down the application, and ordered the CTC to pay $30,000 in court costs.

== Transit alternatives ==
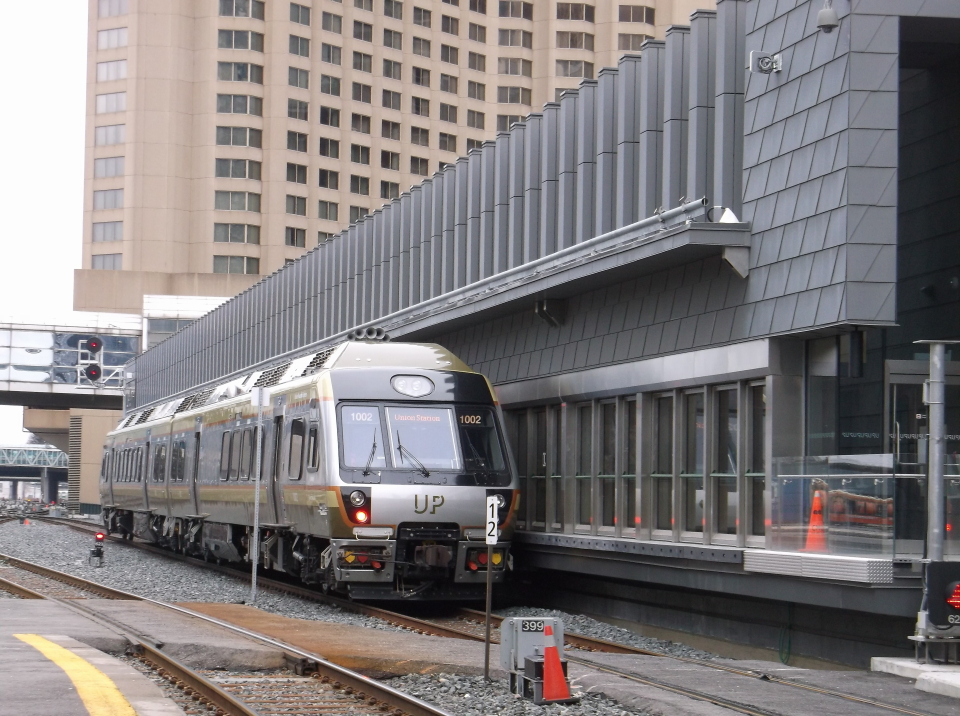
Union Pearson train at Union Station

The Toronto Transit Commission offers a frequent express bus route, the 900 Airport Express, between Kipling station and Pearson. Buses depart every 10 minutes or less, and a trip from downtown to Pearson Airport takes 45 minutes for the cost of a TTC fare.

From 1993 until 2014, the Toronto Airport Express was a privately operated airport bus service from the airport to downtown Toronto operated by Pacific Western Transportation. The route was founded by Gray Coach in 1979. As of 2012, a "One Ride Scheduled Service" to or from downtown Toronto cost $26.95 and a "One Ride On-Demand Airport Express Connect" fare cost $29.95. A one-way trip took approximately 45 to 90 minutes, depending on traffic. The service ceased operation on 31 October 2014 due to anticipated competition from the then-upcoming Union Pearson Express, alongside other factors such as declining ridership, the popularity of the Billy Bishop Airport on Toronto Island, and delays due to downtown road construction.

Other public transit bus services – operated by GO Transit, MiWay, and Brampton Transit – connect Pearson Airport to Toronto and other cities in the Greater Toronto Area.

== Future ==
As of 2019, Metrolinx is planning a major upgrade to the Union Pearson Express to better integrate it into the GO Transit rail network and to double the frequency of trains to the airport. As of September 2019, planning work was in its early stages and no plans had been finalized. The proposal includes:

- Replacement of the existing diesel trainsets with electric trains that could also be used elsewhere in the GO Transit network once parts of that network are electrified.
- Relocation of the Union Station platform for UP Express from the west wing of Union Station to the middle of the train shed south of the station's Great Hall.
- Elimination of high platform areas at GO stations along the route, with UP Express trains using the same platforms as regular GO trains.

According to the planning document dated 22 February 2019, it is uncertain whether the UP Express infrastructure at airport Terminal 1 can be modified to accommodate electrified GO trains. There were no cost estimates for infrastructure changes.
