= Kipling Bus Terminal =

Regional bus terminal in Toronto, Canada

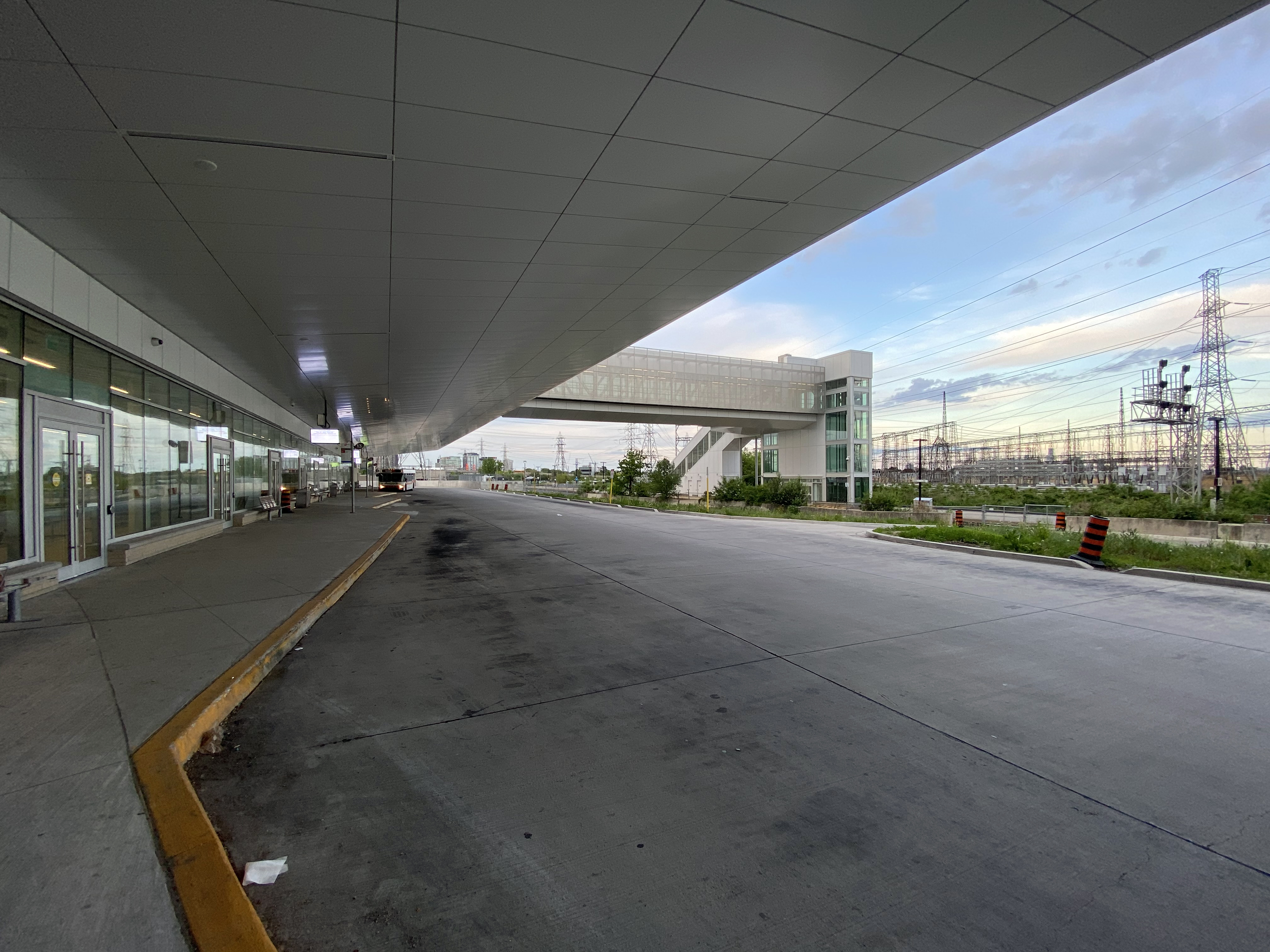
- Kipling Bus Terminal in 2022

General information
- Location: 120 Subway Crescent; Toronto, Ontario; Canada
- Coordinates: 43°38′8″N 79°32′18″W
- Owner: Metrolinx
- Bus stands: 14
- Bus operators: MiWay; GO Transit
- Connections: 900 at Kipling; at Kipling GO Station

Construction
- Accessible: Yes

Other information
- Station code: GO Transit: 02778
- Website: MiWay

History
- Opened: January 4, 2021
Location

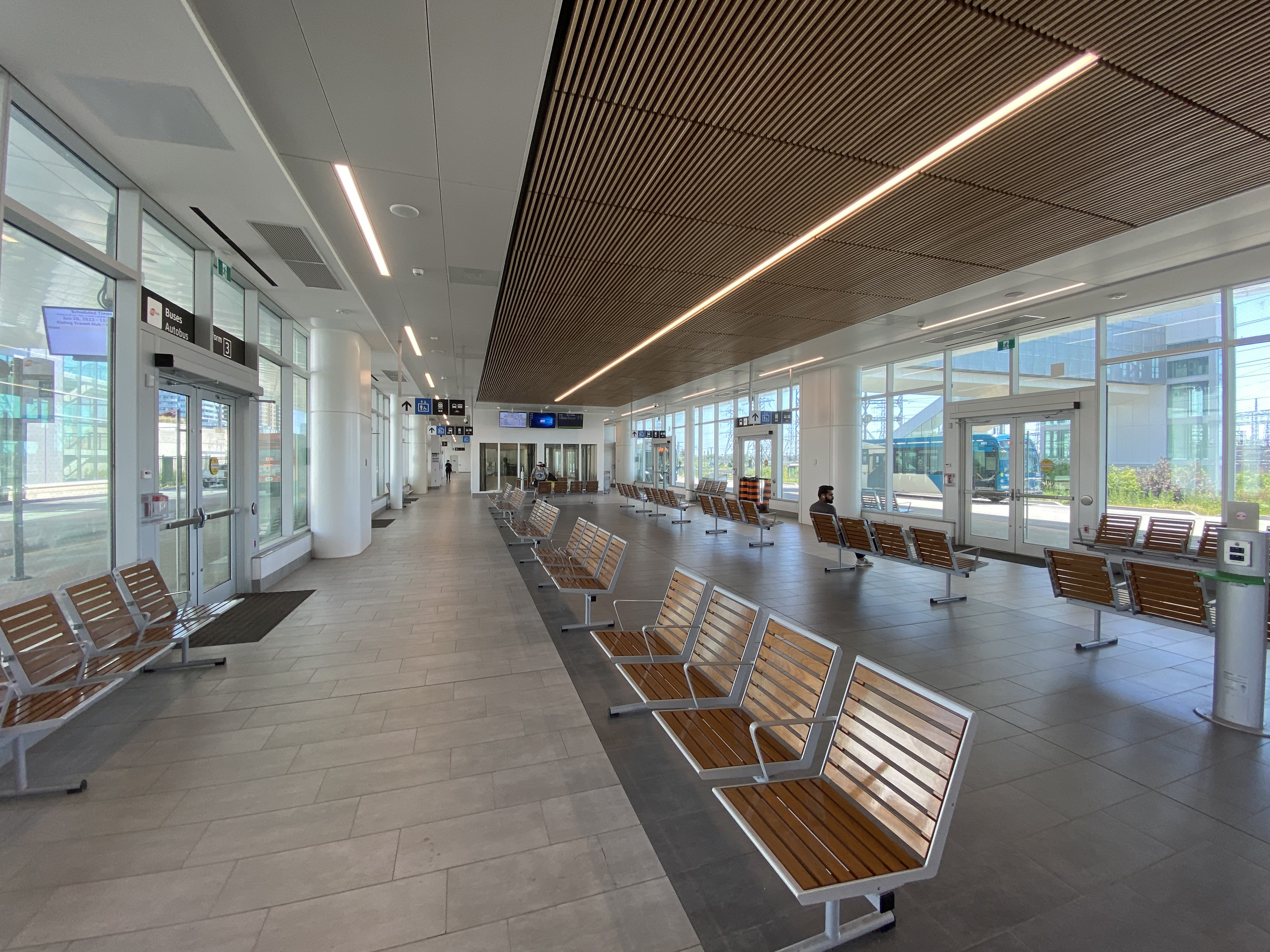
Waiting area

Kipling Bus Terminal is a regional bus terminal in Toronto, Ontario, Canada. The terminal serves MiWay and GO Transit buses. It is owned by Metrolinx and is a part of the Kipling Transit Hub, a Metrolinx mobility hub, together with Kipling station and Kipling GO Station. The terminal first opened on January 4, 2021, replacing the former MiWay bus connection to the Line 2 Bloor–Danforth subway at Islington station.

== History ==
Before the construction of the Kipling Bus Terminal, MiWay buses connected with the Line 2 Bloor–Danforth subway connection at Islington station. After opening, all MiWay bus routes where adjusted to service the terminal, with the exception of route 26 Burnhamthorpe.

In December 2007, a draft memorandum of understanding was created between the City of Toronto, the Toronto Transit Commission, GO Transit, and Mississauga Transit for the construction of a new regional terminal at Kipling station. The memorandum was never signed, but the concept of a regional bus terminal at Kipling station remained.

In May 2016, a new memorandum of understanding was signed for the construction of the terminal on top of an existing commuter parking lot. On November 30, 2016, a request for qualifications was issued by Infrastructure Ontario for the construction of the terminal. This was followed by a request for proposal on April 3, 2017; on March 22, 2018, EllisDon Infrastructure Transit was awarded the CA$73 million contract to design, build, and finance the terminal.

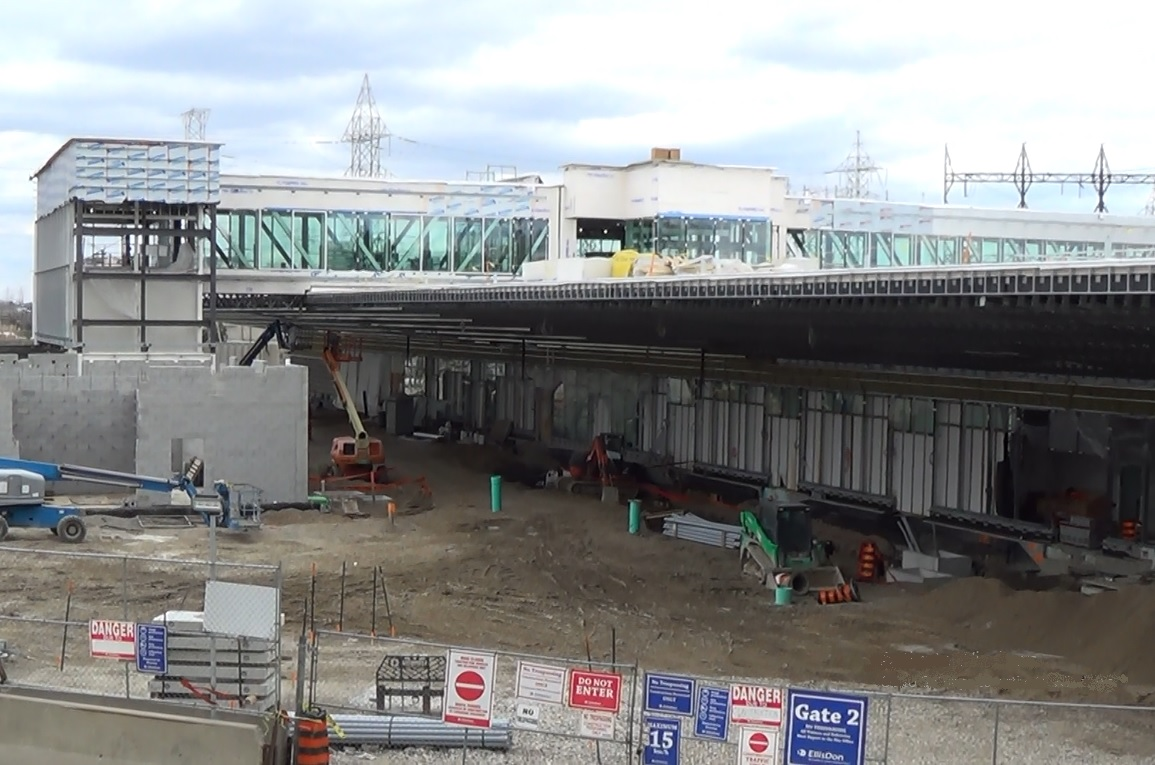
The bus terminal under construction in April 2020

Construction lasted from April 13, 2018, to December 29, 2020. On January 4, 2021, service began at the terminal when all MiWay bus routes serving Islington station where adjusted to serve the terminal instead, with the exception of route 26 Burnhamthorpe. GO Transit did not serve the terminal until September 2021, when GO Transit bus route 29, which operated between Mississauga and Guelph, was extended to the terminal.

On February 26, 2024, the One Fare program, a GTHA-wide fare integration program, was implemented. The program allows free or discounted transfers between TTC, GO Transit and MiWay for riders paying with a Presto, credit, or debit card within a two-hour window (or within a three-hour if GO Transit is used). The regional terminal was kept outside of TTC's Kipling station fare-paid area as free or discounted card transfers need to be recorded for the province to reimburse local transit agencies, as well as for enforcing payment of double fares for customers ineligible to receive free or discounted transfers with other transit agencies.

== Features and location ==
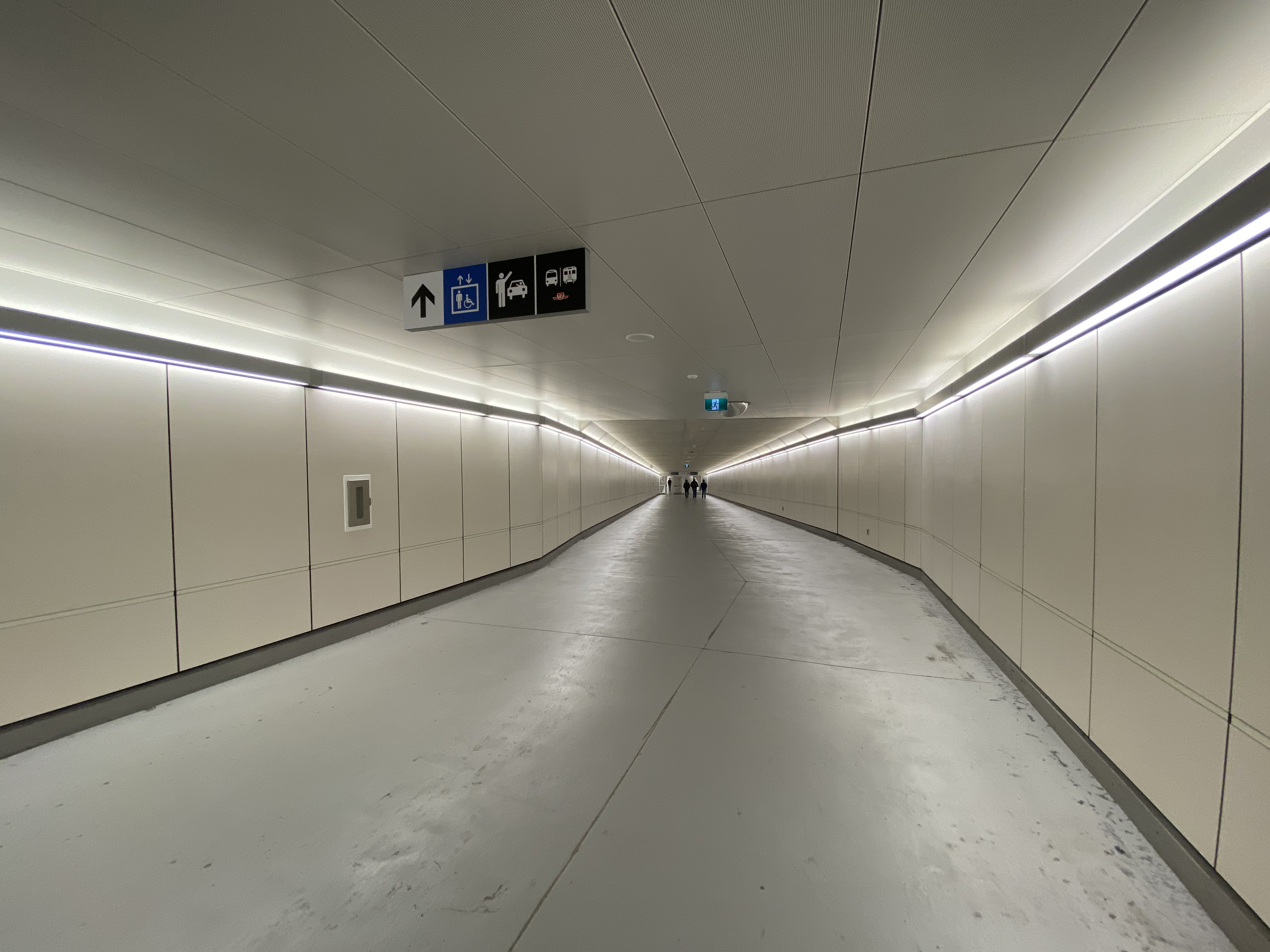
Pedestrian tunnel between Kipling Bus Terminal and the subway station

The terminal is located at the south end of Subway Crescent, southeast of both Kipling station and the intersection of Dundas Street and Kipling Avenue. It consists of 14 bays, with 4 being used by GO Transit and the remaining 10 by MiWay. It is connected to Kipling GO Station through an elevated pedestrian bridge to the south and to Kipling station via an underground tunnel to the northeast. These connections form the Kipling Transit Hub, a Metrolinx mobility hub which aims to provide a seamless connection between the three facilities.

== Services ==
=== MiWay ===
All MiWay routes are wheelchair accessible and the following serve the terminal:

| Route | Name | Notes |
|---|---|---|
| 1 | Dundas | To Ridgeway Drive; Via University of Toronto Mississauga |
| 3 | Bloor | To City Centre |
| 11 | Westwood | To Westwood Square Mall; Via Highway 427 |
| 20 | Rathburn | To City Centre |
| 26 | Burnhamthorpe | To South Common Centre; Via Islington Station and City Centre |
| 35 | Eglinton | To Churchill Meadows Community Centre |
| 70 | Keaton | To Milverton Drive (AM rush hour service) |
| 71 | Sheridan | To Sheridan Research Park; Via Sheridan Centre (AM rush hour service) |
| 101 | Dundas Express | To Ridgeway Drive; Via University of Toronto Mississauga |
| 108 | Financial Express | To Meadowvale Business Park; Via Highways 427 and 401 (AM rush hour service) |
| 109 | Meadowvale Express | To Meadowvale Town Centre; Via Highway 427, Mississauga Transitway, and City Centre |
| 126 | Burnhamthorpe Express | To University of Toronto Mississauga (Rush hour service) |
| 135 | Eglinton Express | To Winston Churchill station (Rush hour service) |

=== GO Transit ===
As of April 2025, the terminal is served by two GO Transit bus routes:

| Route | Name | Notes |
|---|---|---|
| 25K | Waterloo / Mississauga | To University of Waterloo; Via Square One Bus Terminal and Kitchener station |
| 29 | Guelph / Mississauga | To Guelph Central Station; Via Square One Bus Terminal and the University of Guelph |
