= Airport Express =

Airport Express may refer to:

== Technology ==
- AirPort Express, a wireless product by Apple Inc.

== Transport ==
=== Rail ===
Several airport rail links are named Airport Express:

- Capital Airport Express of Beijing Subway, the airport transit service to Beijing Capital International Airport in Beijing, China
- Daxing Airport Express of Beijing Subway, the airport transit service to Beijing Daxing International Airport in Beijing, China
- Flughafen-Express, the airport railway service to Berlin Brandenburg International Airport provided by Deutsche Bahn
- Airport Express Line (Delhi Metro), a Delhi Metro line linking Indira Gandhi International Airport
- Airport Express (MTR), the airport railway service in Hong Kong provided by MTR, the first of its type and the first to be named so
- AREX (Airport Express), the airport railway service between Incheon Airport, Gimpo Airport and Seoul, South Korea
- KLIA Ekspres, the airport railway express service between Kuala Lumpur and Kuala Lumpur International Airport in Malaysia
- Aeroexpress (Moscow, Sochi, Vladivostok), operator of airport rail link services in Russia

=== Bus ===
Several airport bus connections are named Airport Express:

- Airport Express (Sydney)
- Toronto Airport Express, a former coach bus service between Downtown Toronto and Toronto Pearson International Airport
- 900 Airport Express, an airport bus in the Greater Toronto Area
- Wisconsin Coach Lines, AS Airport Express operates frequently to O'Hare Airport (ORD), Midway Airport (MDW) and Mitchell Airport (MKE) from Waukesha, Milwaukee, Racine, and Kenosha

== See also ==
- Airport Express Train (disambiguation)
- Airport Line (disambiguation)
