= Airport Line =

An Airport Line is an airport rail link providing rail transport from the airport to other parts of the city.

Routes specifically named Airport Line include:

== Asia ==
- Kūkō Line (空港線, Kūkō-sen; "Airport Line" in Japanese) may refer to:
  - Kūkō Route (空港線, Kūkō-sen), a part of Japanese national highway Route 41, the section inside Nagoya.
  - Airport Line (空港線, Kūkō-sen), or Line 1, of the Fukuoka City Subway
  - Keikyū Airport Line (京急空港線, Keikyū Kūkō-sen)
  - Meitetsu Airport Line (名鉄空港線, Meitetsu Kūkō-sen)
  - Nankai Airport Line (南海空港線, Nankai Kūkō-sen)
  - Official nickname of JR Miyazaki Kūkō Line.
  - Unofficial name of JR Narita Line Airport Branch Line.
  - Unofficial name of Sendai Airport Line.
  - Unofficial name of Hanshin Expressway Route 11.
- Taoyuan Airport MRT (also known as Taoyuan Metro Airport line) in Taiwan

== Europe ==
- Airport Line (Manchester Metrolink)

== North America ==
- Airport Line (SEPTA)

== Oceania ==
- Airport line, Brisbane
- Airport line, Perth

== See also ==
- Airport rail link
- Airport Link (disambiguation)
- List of IATA-indexed railway stations
- List of airport rail link systems
- Airport Express (disambiguation)
