= Kipling Avenue =

Road in Toronto, Canada

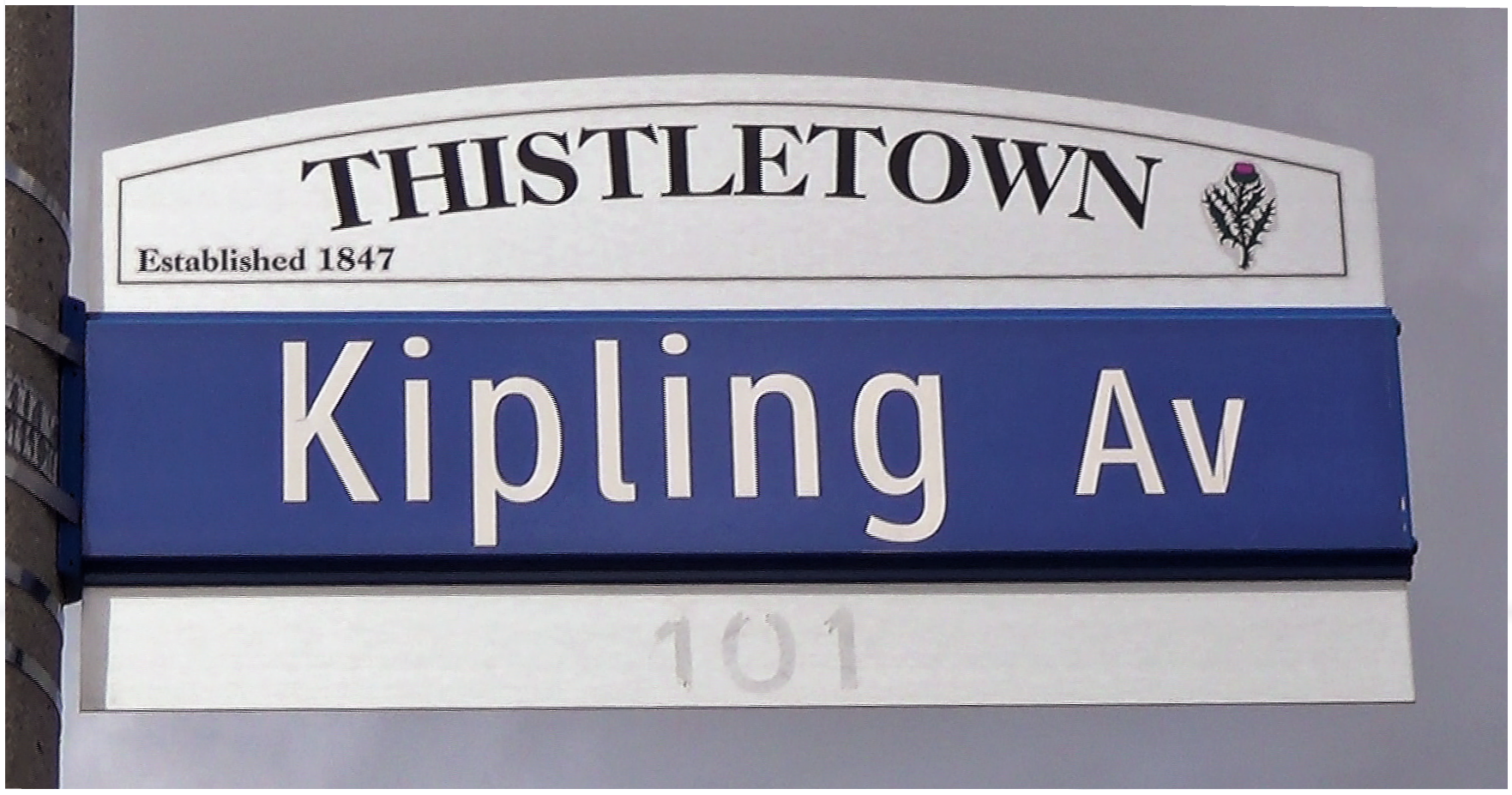
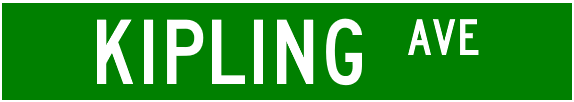

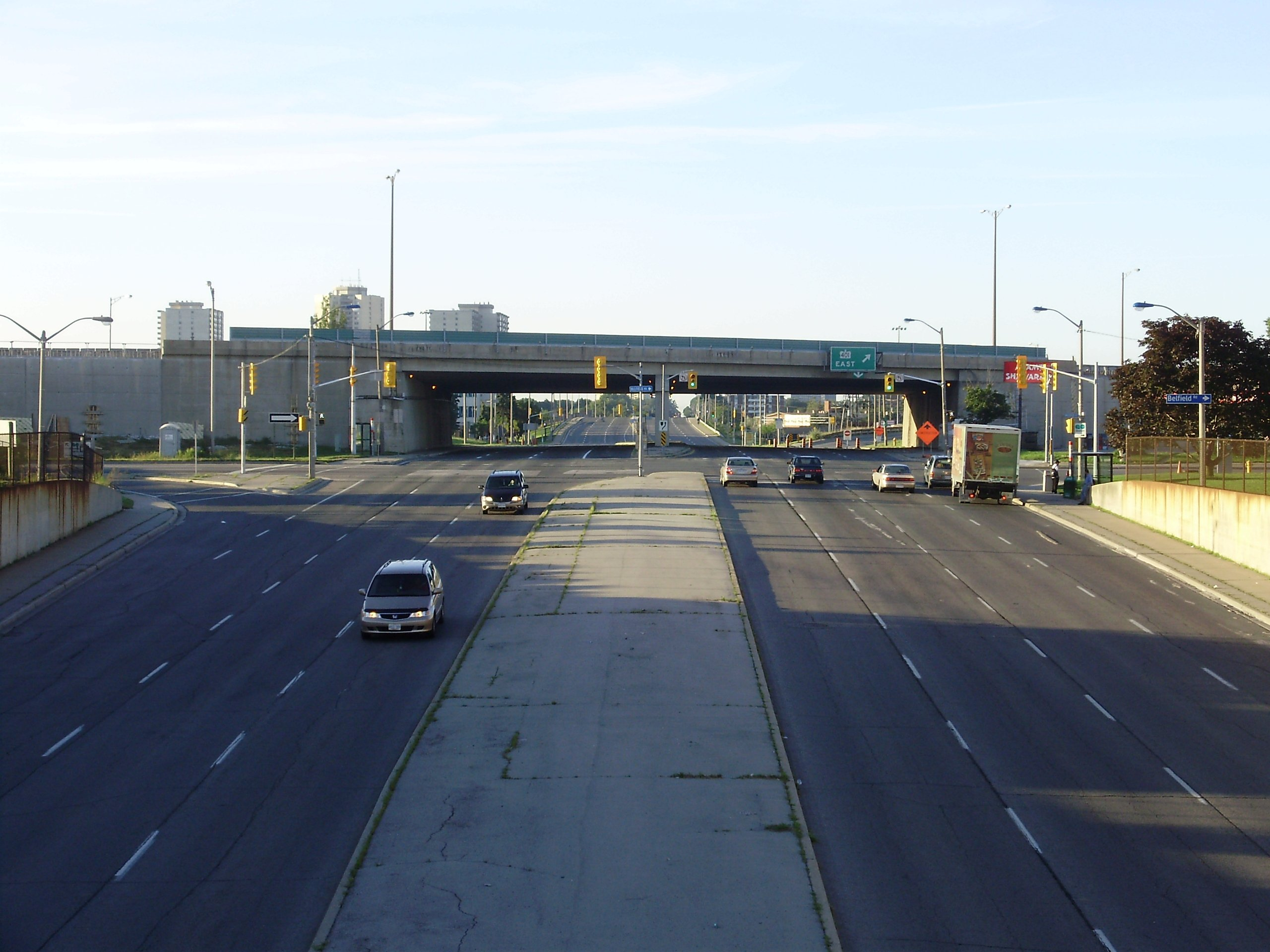
- Kipling Avenue at Highway 409, with Highway 401 just beyond

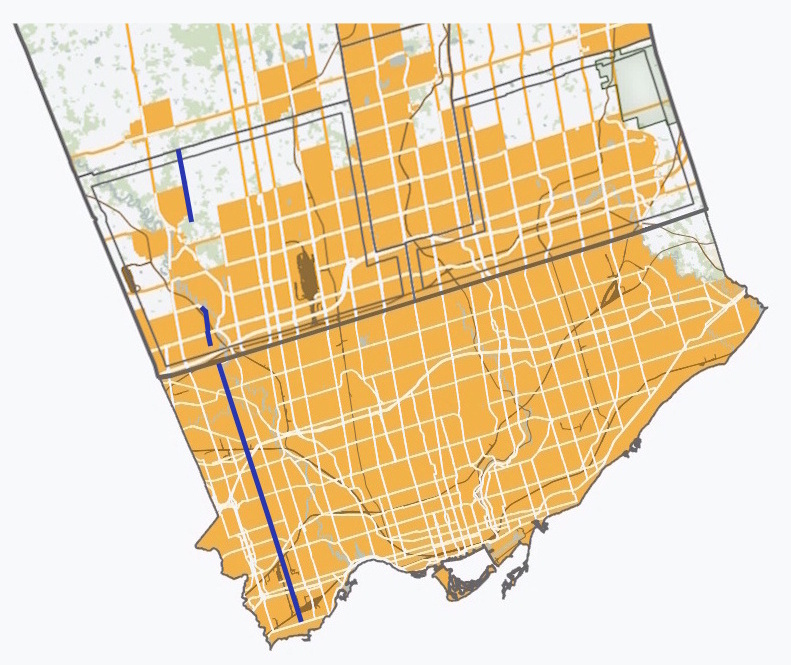
- Route of Kipling Avenue through Toronto and Vaughan (blue line)
- Maintained by: City of Toronto; City of Vaughan
- Length: 26.4 km (16.4 mi)
- Location: Toronto; Vaughan
- South end: Lake Shore Boulevard
- Major junctions: Gardiner Expressway; The Queensway; Dundas Street; Bloor Street; Burnhamthorpe Road; Eglinton Avenue; Dixon Road; Highway 409; Rexdale Boulevard; Albion Road; Finch Avenue; Steeles Avenue ------Road breaks------ Highway 7 Langstaff Road ------Road breaks------ Teston Road
- North end: King-Vaughan Road

Kipling Avenue is a street in the cities of Toronto and Vaughan in Ontario, Canada. It is a concession road, 6 concessions (12 km) west from Yonge Street, and is a major north–south arterial road. It consists of three separate sections, with total combined length of 26.4 km. (16.4 mi.).

The street travels through the district of Etobicoke and serves areas such as New Toronto, Etobicoke Centre, Richview, and Rexdale, passing through residential neighbourhoods and pockets of industrial and commercial areas. The Toronto Transit Commission's 45 Kipling, 44 Kipling South, 944 Kipling South Express and 945 Kipling Express bus routes operate from Kipling Station on the Bloor-Danforth line. These surface routes provide service along the length of the road.

Film studio complex Kipling Studio located on 777 Kipling Avenue is part of Cinespace Film Studios.

== History ==
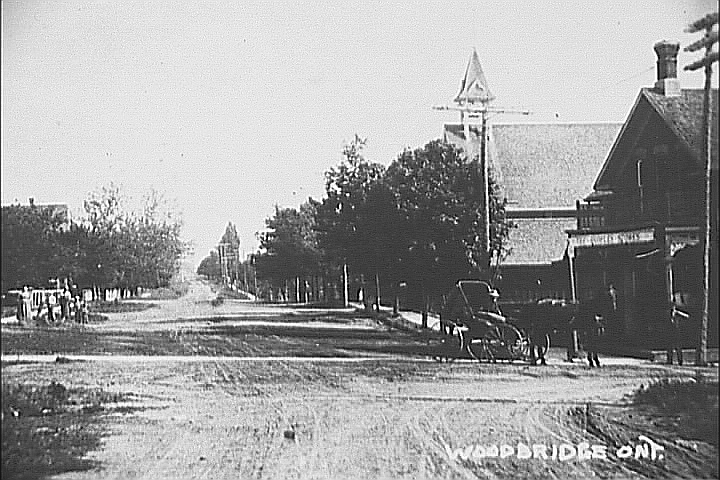
Kipling Avenue (then Eighth Avenue) in Woodbridge, circa 1850

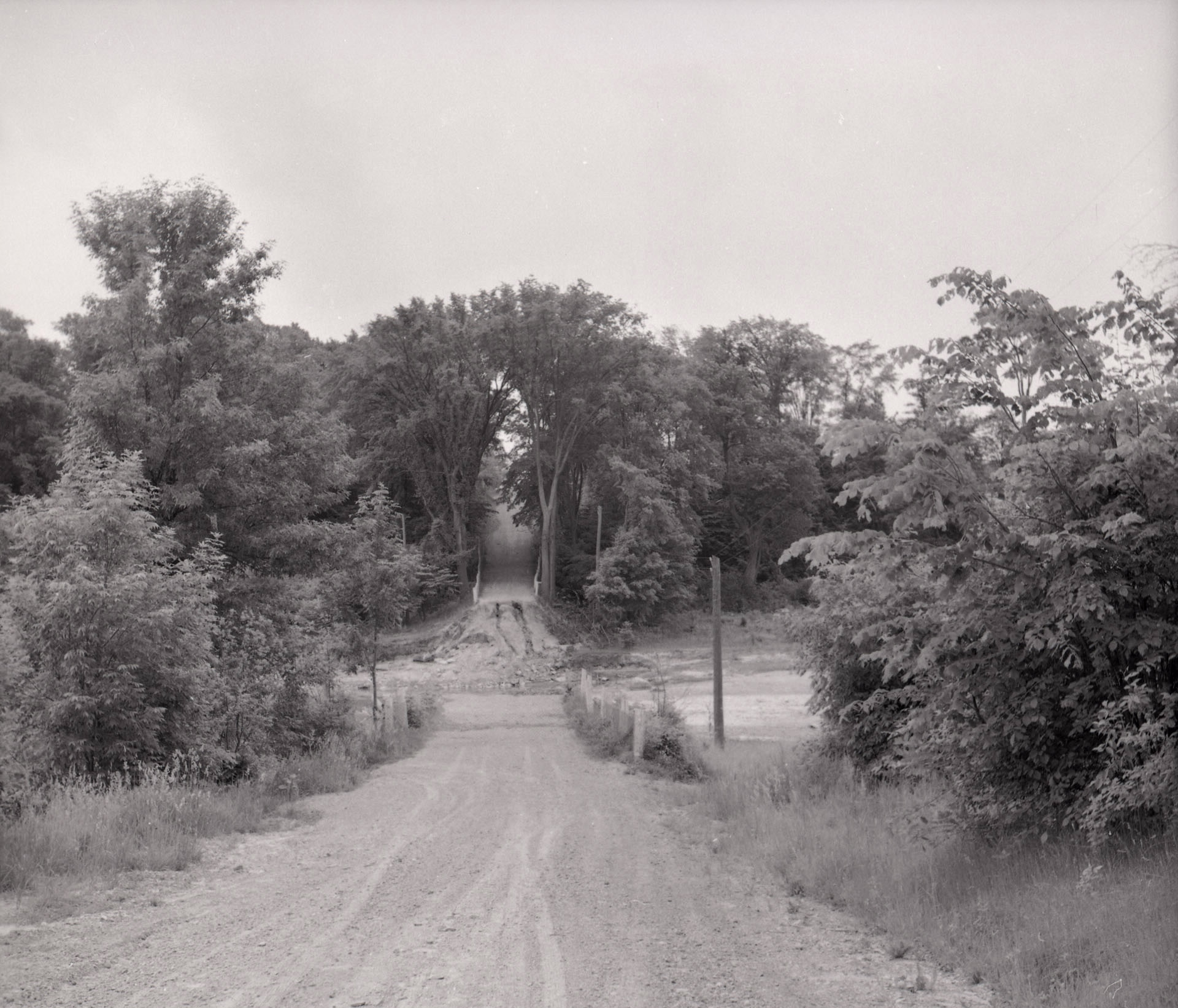
Looking north on Kipling Avenue in 1955 towards the bridge over the west branch of the Humber River after it was washed out by Hurricane Hazel.

Originally named Mimico Avenue, the street was surveyed in 1795 as a Meridian road south of the east-west Meridian (now Rathburn Road) with lots to the east running east–west and lots to the west running north–south. The street became a central street for the lake shore municipalities of New Toronto (in which it is situated) and Long Branch. It is believed (but unproven) that the street was named in honour of Rudyard Kipling, author of such works as The Jungle Book and the Just So Stories, in preparation for a planned visit to Woodbridge in 1907. Kipling cancelled at the last moment, but the street retained the name.

The Kipling Avenue section in the Town of New Toronto also reverted to its alternate name, Eighteenth Street, at least twice. The section in Woodbridge, was named Eighth Avenue.

Kipling Avenue was extended south of Lake Shore Boulevard West with the development of the former Lakeshore Psychiatric Hospital grounds. In 2001 City Council renamed the southerly extension as "Colonel Samuel Smith Park Drive", after rejecting the City Surveyor's original suggestion of Eighteenth Street.

The Six Points interchange with Bloor and Ontario's early Toronto-to-Hamilton highway, now Dundas has traditionally been Etobicoke's central intersection. In 1953 Etobicoke left York County and joined the newly formed Metropolitan Toronto launching a period of urbanization which included changing the Six Points intersection to use a number of bridges in 1961. In 2017, construction started on a project to remove the interchange and replace it with at-grade intersections. In March 2019, the interchange was closed and the bridges were removed.

Kipling Avenue remains one of two streets to go north of Steeles Avenue (due to the short southward bend of Steeles) and still be within the City of Toronto (the other being Midland Avenue). It ends abruptly at the Toronto-Vaughan border. North of that border, Kipling is a broken street and appears briefly from Highway 7 to Langstaff Road. Its original alignment becomes Clarence Street until Major Mackenzie Road. It begins abruptly again south of Teston Road before finally terminating at King-Vaughan Road.

== Landmarks ==
Sights along Kipling Avenue in Toronto (north to south):

- North Humber Park
- North Kipling Park
- North Kipling Junior Middle School
- North Albion Collegiate Institute
- St. Andrew Catholic School
- Albion Centre
- Albion Arena
- Toronto Public Library Rexdale branch
- Kipling Heights Plaza
- Toronto Public Library Northern Elms branch
- Mississauga Private School
- Heatherbrae Middle School, now known as Monsignor Percy Johnson Catholic High School
- Etobicoke North GO Station
- Westway Plaza
- Dixon Grove Junior Middle School
- Denfield Park
- Islington Golf Club
- Six Points interchange
- Kipling subway station
- Kipling GO Station
- Kipling-Queensway Mall
- Mimico Correctional Centre
- New Toronto Secondary School, now Lakeshore Collegiate Institute
- Humber College Lakeshore campus
- Father John Redmond Catholic Secondary School
- Colonel Samuel Smith Park

== See also ==
- Kipling Collegiate Institute
