= Islington station (Toronto) =

Toronto subway station

Islington
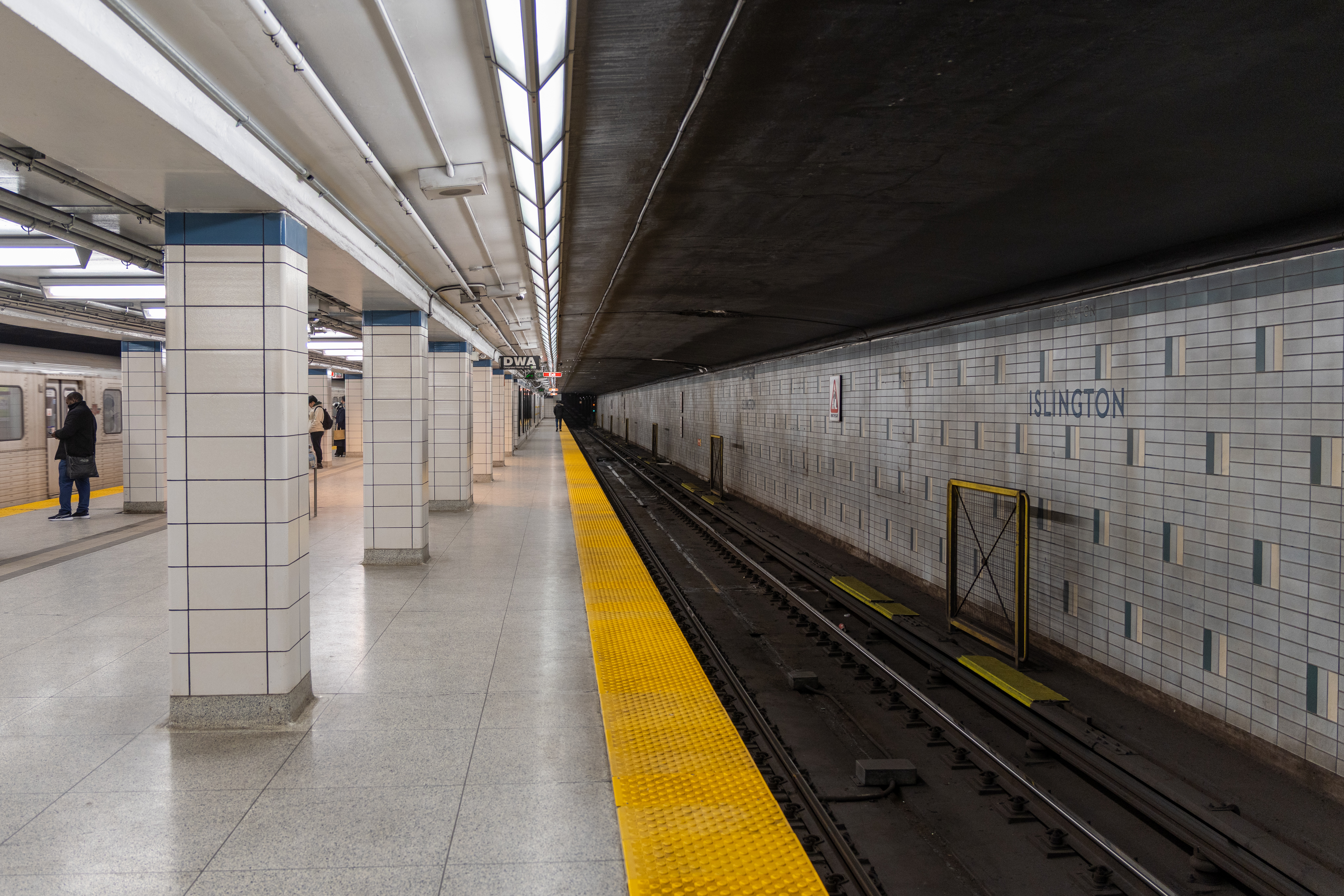
- Islington station platform

General information
- Location: 1226 Islington Avenue; Toronto, Ontario; Canada
- Coordinates: 43°38′43″N 79°31′29″W
- Platforms: Centre platform
- Tracks: 2
- Connections: TTC buses: 37 Islington; 50 Burnhamthorpe; 110 Islington South; 300 Bloor–Danforth; 337 Islington; 937 Islington Express; 26 Burnhamthorpe

Construction
- Structure type: Underground
- Parking: 977 spaces
- Accessible: No

Other information
- Website: Official station page

History
- Opened: May 10, 1968; 58 years ago

Passengers
- 2023–2024: 25,023
- Rank: 22 of 70

Services
Preceding station	Toronto Transit Commission	Following station
Kipling Terminus	Line 2 Bloor–Danforth	Royal York towards Kennedy
Location

Islington is a subway station on Line 2 Bloor–Danforth of the Toronto subway in Toronto, Ontario, Canada. It is located on the north side of Bloor Street West on the west side of Islington Avenue. A central platform serves trains running in both directions. The station opened in 1968 and was the western terminus of the line until 1980.

== History ==
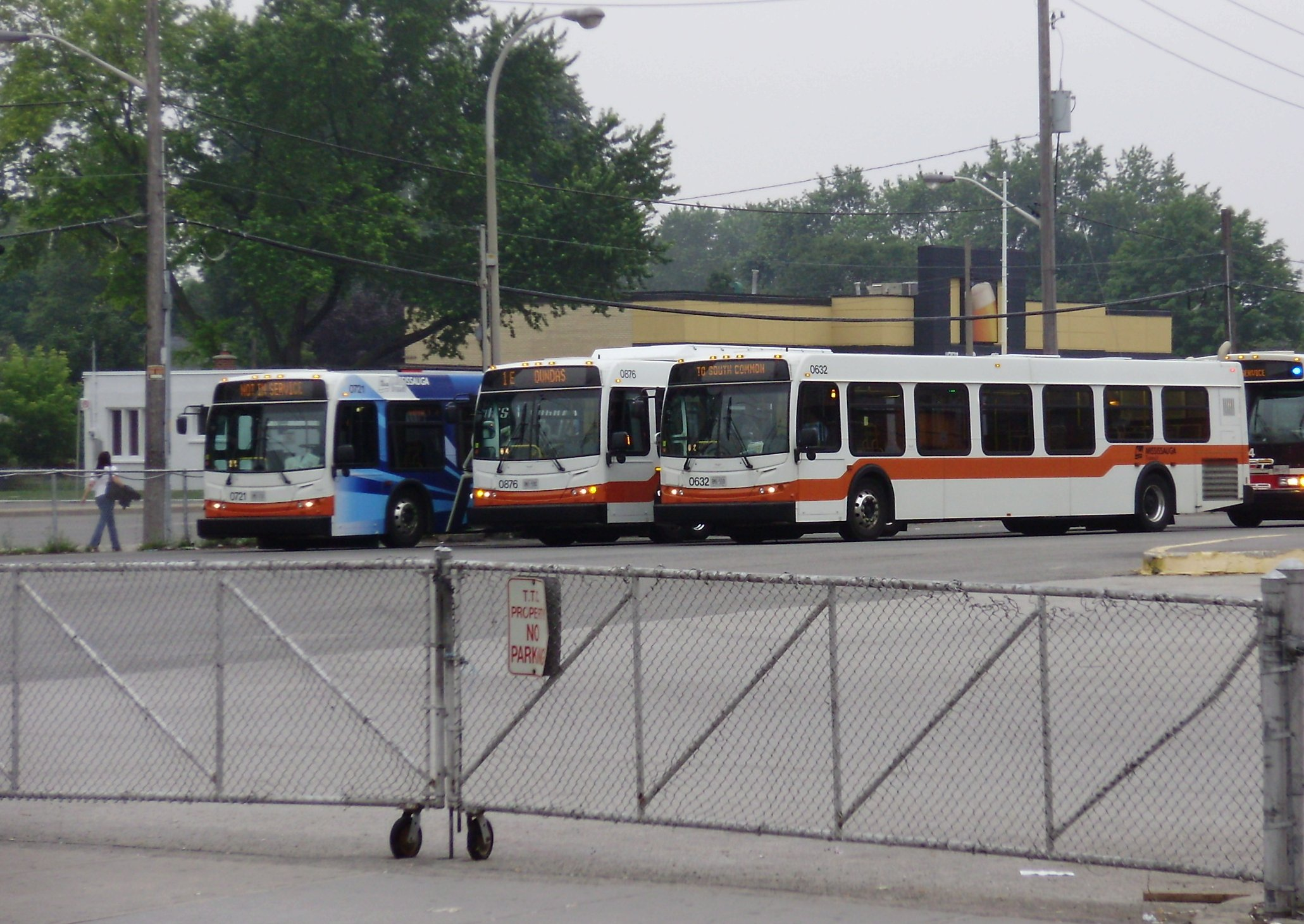
Mississauga Transit (now MiWay) buses laying over at Islington station in 2008

Islington station was opened in 1968 in what was then the Borough of Etobicoke and served as the western terminus for Line 2 Bloor–Danforth for 12 years until the extension to Kipling was completed in 1980.

Until 1973, TTC buses and subway trains serving the station were in separate fare zones and so turnstiles and collector booths were placed between the bus bays and the subway platforms. The fare barrier was reconfigured after the zones were abolished to put the bus bays inside the fare-paid zone, and its layout was simplified in a later renovation.

However, the bus bays have also been used by non-TTC buses. In the early years, some Gray Coach long-distance services called at Islington, and the Airport Express, also then operated by Gray Coach, had an Islington station route. Greyhound eventually took over this Gray Coach route in 1992 and transferred to Pacific Western Europe in 1993. MiWay buses from Mississauga, which at first stopped outside the station, began using several of the bus bays in 1980 after they were no longer needed for TTC buses once Kipling station opened. On January 4, 2021, MiWay moved its operations from this station to a new regional bus terminal at Kipling station.

A redevelopment of the bus terminal is planned during the 2020s, as part of upgrade works to make the station accessible. In 2026, construction of a new bus terminal was underway, with plans to demolish the old terminal.

== Station description ==
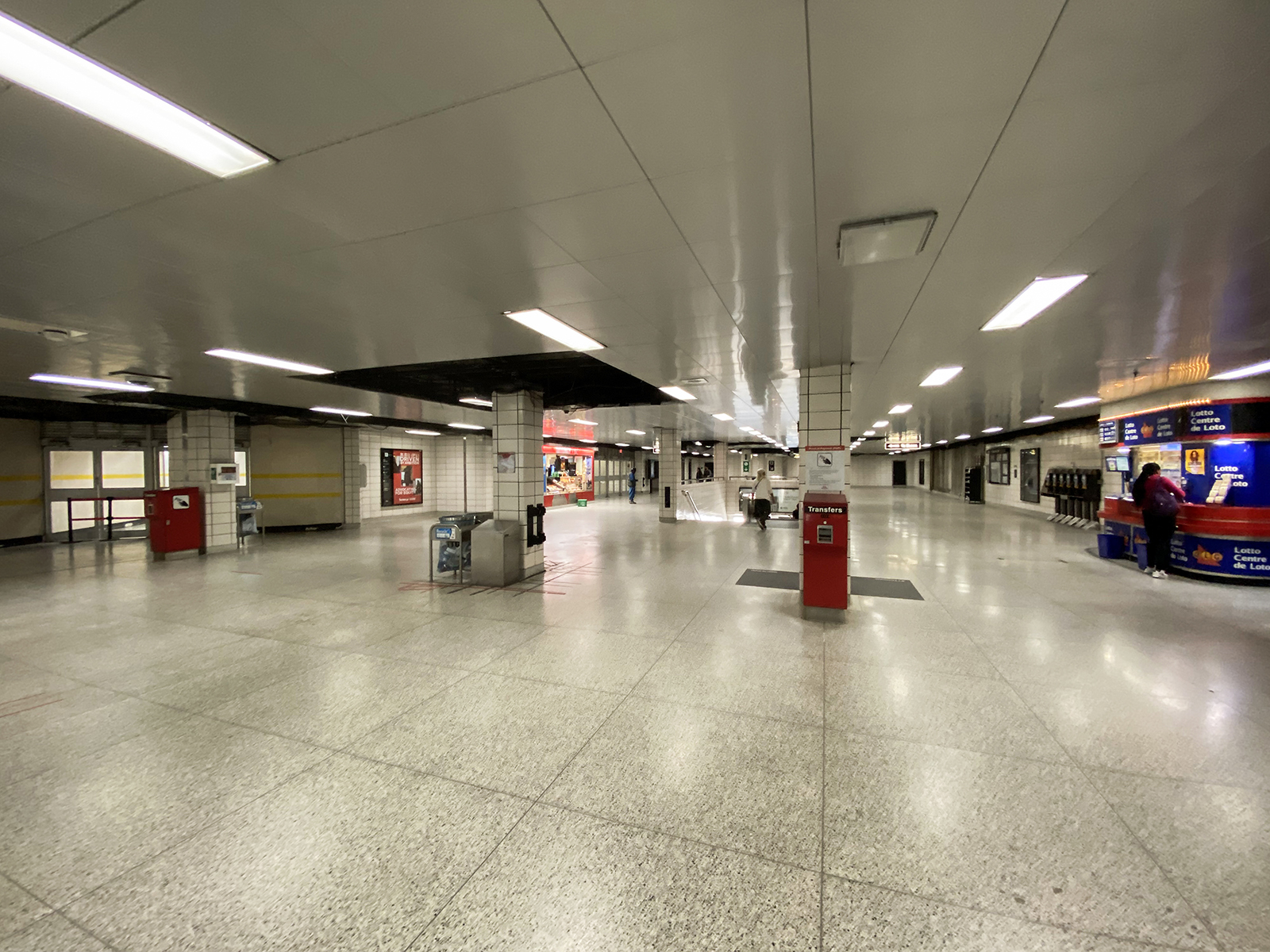
Concourse

The station is located on the northwest side of Bloor Street West and Islington Avenue, and is built on three levels. Street level is where all three parking lots, all three entrances, as well as where the bus platform is located. The entrances to the station can be found at the main parking, and at the east and west sides of Islington Avenue respectively.

Below street level is the concourse and collector, which provides stair access to the bus platforms above it. The subway platforms are underneath the concourse and collector level. There are no elevators in this station, which makes it inaccessible for persons with physical disabilities.

=== Parking ===
Three parking lots serve Islington station, providing a total of 977 spaces: The main lot beside the station northwest of Bloor Street at Islington has 534 spaces; the lot at the north end of Lomond Drive has 283 spaces; and the newest lot beside the railway tracks on the south side of Bloor Street off Fieldway Road has 160 spaces. All three of these parking lots are scheduled to be redeveloped in the 2020s, for station upgrade work as well as new residential development.

== Subway infrastructure in the vicinity ==
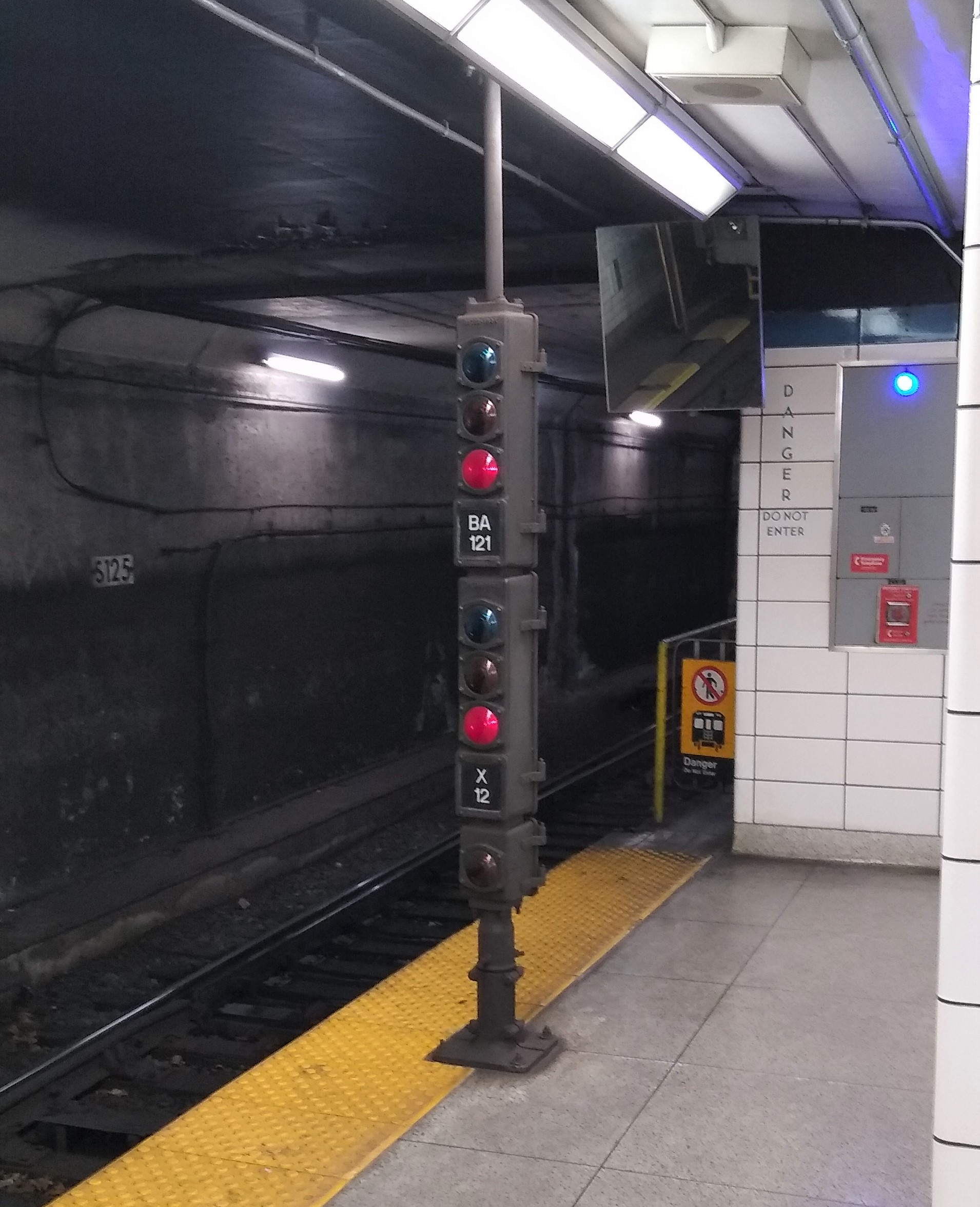
Signal at the east end of the platform

There is a both a crossover (used mainly back when the station was a terminus, but still used occasionally to short turn trains) and a centre storage track east of the station, with the crossover being situated directly adjacent to it. The centre track is immediately east of the crossover and is partially underground and on the surface, creating a triple portal unique to the subway system: the Montgomery Portal. The line then crosses Mimico Creek on a bridge and then returns underground at the Aberfoyle Portal, en route to Royal York station.

== Station redevelopment ==
The deadline to make all Toronto subway stations accessible is 2025, as per the Accessibility for Ontarians with Disabilities Act. As of December 2025, platforms at Islington station are not accessible.

In the late 2000s, the TTC planned to renovate and upgrade the station – replacing the existing bus terminal, providing elevators to the subway platform, and completing overall station modernization. An open house was held on April 22, 2008, and the project's stated completion time was given as between 2011 and 2012. The project had not been completed by 2014, and its completion date was being pushed further into the future at that time.

In 2021, MiWay buses, with the exception of route 26 Burnhamthorpe, moved to the new Kipling bus terminal, freeing up the Islington site for redevelopment. Route 26 Burnhamthorpe does not enter the bus terminal and instead utilizes the on-street stop. Plans were subsequently submitted by the TTC to the city government for redevelopment of the station. These would involve replacing the existing bus terminal with a new TTC bus terminal, providing elevators throughout the station and building a new station entrance on Islington Avenue.

The existing commuter parking lots to the south of the station are also proposed to be redeveloped by the city for residential development.

In the second quarter of 2023, the TTC began constructing elevators for the centre platform; the elevators will connect to the street-level concourse. Elevators in the station will be in service by mid-2027. Part of this project would include the station being fully redeveloped and a new TTC bus terminal being built.

== Nearby landmarks ==
- Bloor Islington Place, at 3250-3300 Bloor St. West, has direct access to the station This office complex is a Class "A" asset, totalling 78,486 m^{2} (844,818 sq ft) in a location situated at the intersection of Bloor and Islington. Three office towers are linked with a retail concourse of multiple retailers, include Sobeys Urban Fresh, a GoodLife Fitness and food court. This west end office complex also features direct access to the subway. On the east side of Islington Avenue and the neighbourhood of Islington Village is short distance north of the station at Dundas Street West.

== Surface connections ==
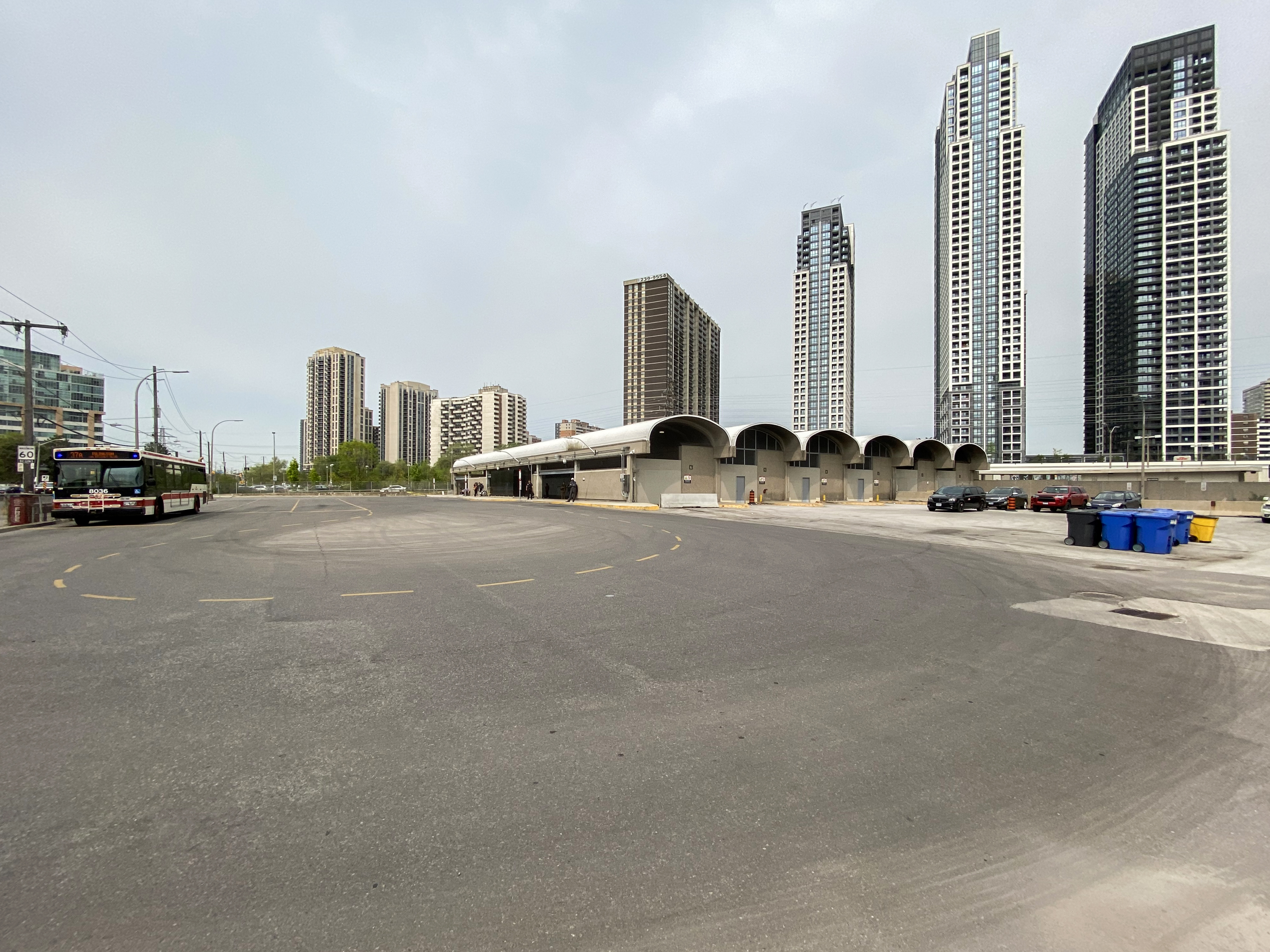
The outdated covered bus terminal at Islington station is similar to that of the original structure at Warden and Victoria Park stations.

The station is served by several TTC bus routes and one MiWay route. All but one of the MiWay system's Toronto-bound bus routes which used to connect at this station were moved to serve a new regional bus terminal which opened on January 4, 2021, at Kipling station.

=== Toronto Transit Commission ===
Buses are accessed via the bus terminal. During overnight hours when the subway is not running, an on-street transfer between buses is required. TTC routes serving the station include:

Bay number	Route	Name	Additional information
1	Permanently closed		
2	Permanently closed		
3	Permanently closed		
4	Permanently closed		
5	Permanently closed		
6 (platform 1)	110A	Islington South	Southbound to Long Branch Loop via Horner Avenue and Browns Line
6 (platform 1)	110B	Islington South	Southbound to Long Branch Loop via Horner Avenue and 30th Street (Rush hour service)
6 (platform 1)	110C	Islington South	Southbound to Kipling Avenue and Lake Shore Boulevard
6 (platform 2)	50	Burnhamthorpe	Westbound to Mill Road
6 (platform 2)	937	Islington Express	Northbound to Steeles Avenue West (Rush hour service)
6 (platform 3)	37A	Islington	Northbound to Humber College via Rexdale Boulevard and Woodbine Racetrack
6 (platform 4)	37B	Islington	Northbound to Steeles Avenue West

Route	Name	Additional information
149	Etobicoke-Bloor	Line 2 Accessibility Shuttle Service; westbound to Kipling station and eastbound to Jane station (On-street transfer)
337	Islington	Blue Night service; northbound to Steeles Avenue West and southbound to Lake Shore Boulevard (On-street transfer)

=== MiWay ===
MiWay's 26 Burnhamthorpe to South Common Centre route continues to serve this station and is boarded on-street.
