= Islington Junior Middle School =

Location
- 44 Cordova Avenue; Etobicoke, Toronto, Ontario, M9A 2H5; Canada
- 43.6475°N 79.5276°W

Information
- School type: Elementary
- Founded: 1832
- School board: Toronto District School Board
- Principal: Michelle Smith
- Grades: Junior Kindergarten - 12th grade
- Enrollment: 1000+ (June 2026)
- Language: English French
- Area: Etobicoke
- Website: schoolweb.tdsb.on.ca/islington/
- Last updated: May 15, 2008

Islington JMS is a public elementary school in the historic Islington neighbourhood of Etobicoke, the western district of Toronto, Ontario, Canada. It is part of the Toronto District School Board and is located close to the intersection of Burnhamthorpe Road and Dundas Street West. It features a highly diverse student body with over 40 languages spoken, reflecting a strong international character. Founded in 1832, it is the oldest school in Etobicoke and the second-oldest elementary school in Toronto.
