= Sheridan Centre Bus Terminal =

Bus terminal in Mississauga, Ontario, Canada

Sheridan Centre

General information
- Location: 2225 Erin Mills Parkway; Mississauga, Ontario; Canada
- Coordinates: 43°31′49″N 79°39′06″W
- Owner: City of Mississauga
- Platforms: 3
- Bus operators: MiWay

Construction
- Parking: Yes, Sheridan mall rear parking lot, not overnight.
Location

Sheridan Centre is a MiWay bus terminal located in southwestern Mississauga, Ontario, Canada, on the eastern side of Sheridan Centre.

As a minor terminal, it does not have a terminal building and only contains bus shelters. Passengers must take a short walk to the nearest entrance of the mall.

== Bus routes ==
Bus service within the terminal is exclusively provided by MiWay.

=== Directly serving the terminal ===
All routes are wheelchair-accessible.

Route		Destination
29	Park Royal	South Common Centre to Clarkson GO Station
71	Sheridan	Sheridan Research Park to Kipling Bus Terminal

=== Indirectly serving the terminal ===
Route		Destination	Connects at
13	Glen Erin	Meadowvale Town Centre to Clarkson GO Station via South Common Centre	Erin Mills Parkway and Fowler Drive
45A	Winston Churchill	Meadowvale Town Centre to Clarkson GO Station	Erin Mills Parkway and Fowler Drive
110	University Express	City Centre to Clarkson GO Station via University of Toronto Mississauga	Erin Mills Parkway and Fowler Drive
