= 900 Airport Express =

Airport bus route in the Greater Toronto Area

Overview
- System: TTC bus system
- Operator: Toronto Transit Commission
- Began service: February 2000
- Predecessors: Toronto Airport Express (1993–2014)

Route
- Locale: Greater Toronto Area
- Communities served: Toronto and Mississauga
- Start: Kipling
- End: Pearson Airport Terminal 3
- Stops: 5

Service
- Level: Daily
- Frequency: 10 minutes or better
- Daily ridership: 3,773 (2022)
- Timetable: Official route page

The 900 Airport Express, originally known as the 192 Airport Rocket, is an express airport bus route in Toronto and Mississauga, Ontario, Canada, operated by the Toronto Transit Commission (TTC). It operates between Kipling, the western terminus of Line 2 Bloor–Danforth, and Toronto Pearson International Airport, primarily via Highway 427. Service runs every 10 minutes or better during operating hours.

Route 900 buses have a unique airport-themed livery and luggage racks, and it is the only bus route displayed on official maps of the Toronto subway.

== Route ==
Route 900 runs between Kipling station in Etobicoke to Toronto Pearson International Airport in Mississauga. A primarily north-south service, it runs along Highway 427 for most of its route. From Kipling, it makes a stop at East Mall Crescent along Dundas Street, and at Pearson Airport it stops at Jetliner Road, Terminal 1, and Terminal 3.

The route is part of the TTC's 10-Minute Network, with service scheduled to run every 10 minutes or better from 6 a.m. to 1 a.m., Monday to Saturday. It also operates on Sundays from 8 a.m. to 1 a.m. It averaged 3,773 daily boardings in November 2022.

=== Stops ===
900 Airport Express
Name	Municipality	Connections
Kipling	Toronto	Kipling GO Station; Kipling Bus Terminal
Dundas St West / East Mall Cres	Toronto	MiWay
Jetliner Rd / Airport Rd	Mississauga	
Pearson Airport Terminal 1	Mississauga	Pearson Airport station Terminal Link
Pearson Airport Terminal 3	Mississauga	Terminal Link

== History ==
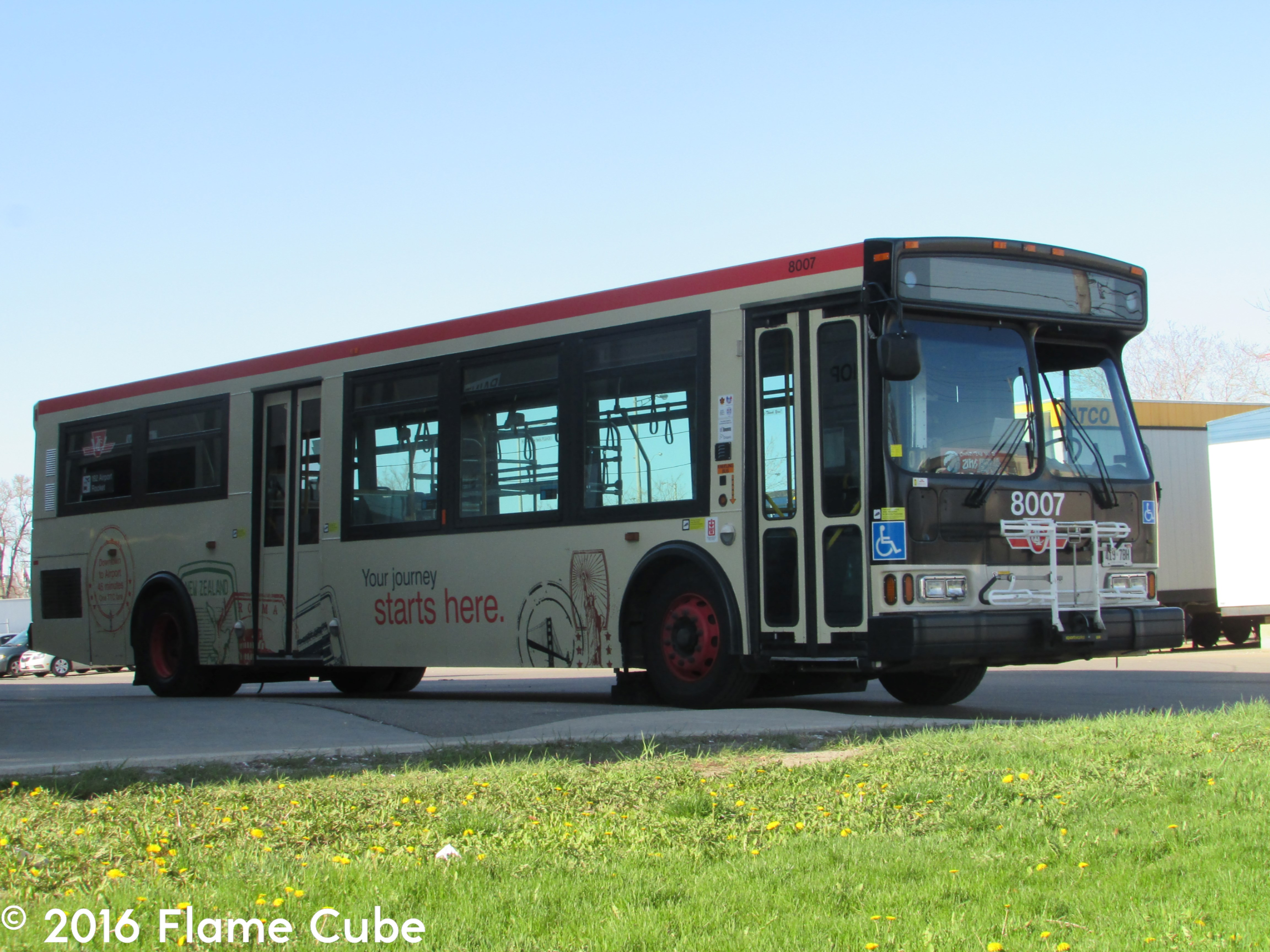
A bus in 192 Airport Rocket livery in 2016

Route 900 was proceeded by the Toronto Airport Express, a bus service operated by Pacific Western Transportation under a contract with the Greater Toronto Airports Authority between 1993 and 2014. The Pacific Western route ran between Pearson Airport and downtown Toronto. Service ceased in 2014 due to declining ridership attributed to the popularity of Billy Bishop airport and delays due to downtown road construction. The Union Pearson Express rail service, which began operation in 2015, also anticipated the closure of the service.

The TTC operated the 192 Airport Rocket route from 2000 to 2018 with a similar route to the 900 Airport Express. Twelve buses from a 2007 order of Orion VIIs for use on route 192 had new airport-themed livery installed and were retrofitted with luggage racks at a cost of $2,000 per bus, which replaced some of the single seats.

In November 2018, the 192 Airport Rocket was renumbered and renamed as the 900 Airport Express to align with the TTC's re-branding of its express bus operations.

== See also ==
- List of Toronto Transit Commission bus routes
