= Toronto Airport Express =

Bus service in Toronto, Canada

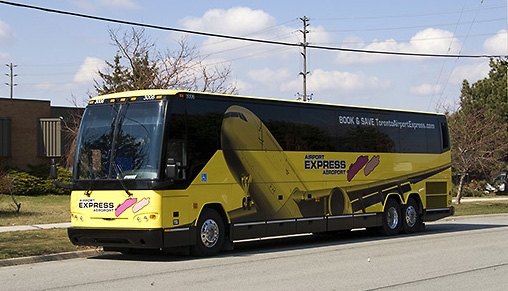
- Airport Express Bus
- Parent: Pacific Western Transportation
- Commenced operation: 1979 (Gray Coach); 1993 (Pacific Western)
- Ceased operation: 2014
- Headquarters: 6999 Ordan Drive; Mississauga, Ontario
- Service area: Toronto
- Service type: Airport Express
- Stops: 8 downtown hotels and 1 bus station
- Destinations: Pearson International Airport, hotels in downtown Toronto
- Hubs: Pearson Airport
- Operator: Pacific Western Transportation Ltd.
- Website: Official Website

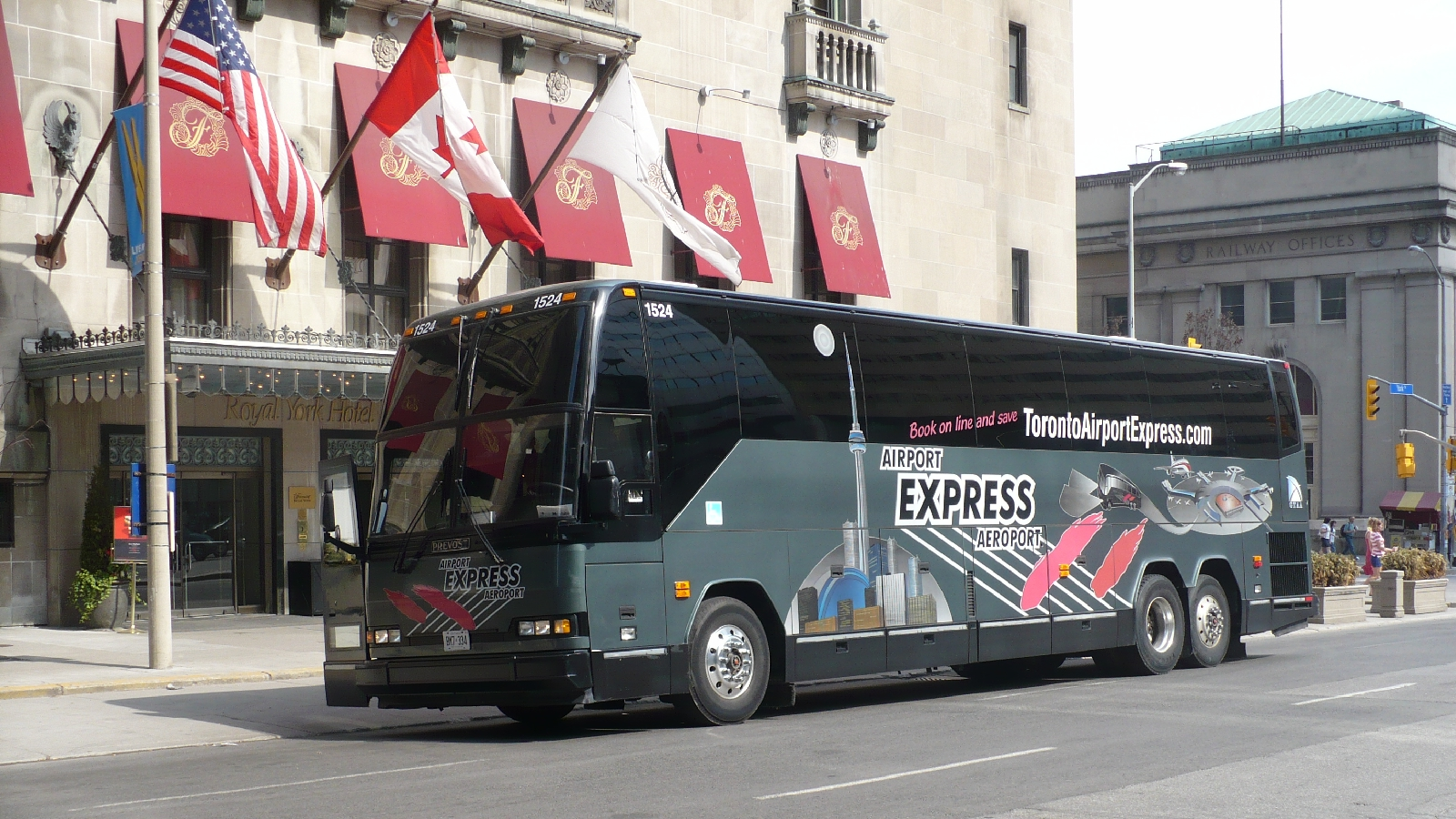
Older buses were painted in a standard grey colour scheme or with graphic adverts

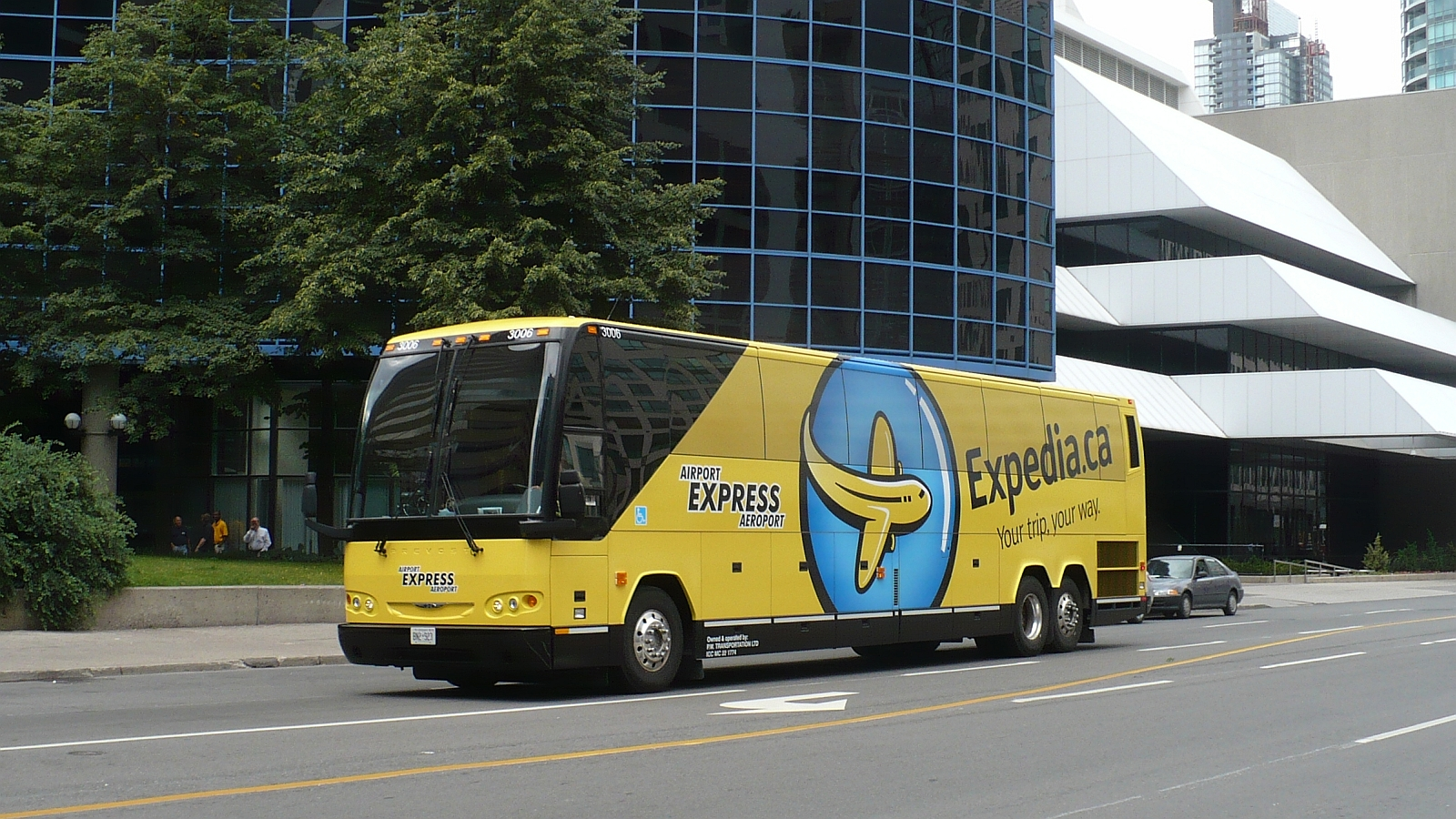
Newer buses were wrapped with advertising for travel related clients

Toronto Airport Express was a bus service operated by Pacific Western Transportation under a contract with the Greater Toronto Airports Authority to operate express bus services between Toronto Pearson International Airport and downtown Toronto. The service was discontinued in October 2014 for various reasons, including the anticipated opening of the Union Pearson Express, a rail link connecting the airport to downtown Toronto.

== History ==
It was established in 1993, after the demise of the previous service provider, Gray Coach. The service operated 20 hours a day, 7 days a week, 365 days a year. It ran at 20-minute intervals during peak times and 30-minute intervals off-peak.

Airport Express (and Gray Coach before them) formerly operated two additional routes, one connecting the airport to Islington subway station and the other to Yorkdale and York Mills stations. These were withdrawn in 2000 after the TTC introduced a competing express bus service from Kipling station, which charges regular TTC fares but, until 2013, used regular TTC buses with no space intended for luggage.

In June 2011, Toronto Airport Express began a connecting, on-demand service called Airport Express Connect, extending the regular scheduled service throughout downtown Toronto. Pacific Western was named the IMG Operator of the Year for 2010. Coach 1559 had a new wrap reflecting this honour, replacing the Young Explorers wrap on this bus.

=== Closure ===
The service ceased operation on October 31, 2014, due to declining ridership, which had fallen from 400,000 to 190,000 in ten years. The decline was attributed to the popularity of the Billy Bishop airport and delays due to downtown road construction. The Union Pearson Express rail service, which began operation in 2015, anticipated the closure of the service. Staff and buses were redeployed back into Pacific Western's other operations in Toronto.

In response to Pacific Western's service closure, the Toronto Transit Commission enhanced its Route 900 Airport Express express bus service between Kipling subway station and the airport by retrofitting buses with luggage racks and increasing the frequency of buses on the route.

== Route ==
There were nine downtown Toronto destinations:

1. Westin Harbour Castle Hotel (Queen's Quay East and Bay Street)
2. Fairmont Royal York/Strathcona Hotel (Front Street West and York Street)
3. InterContinental Toronto Centre (Simcoe Street and Front Street West)
4. Holiday Inn on King (King Street West and Peter Street)
5. Sheraton Centre (Queen Street West and York Street)
6. Metropolitan Hotel / Chestnut Residence (U of T) (Dundas Street West and Chestnut Street)
7. Toronto Bus Terminal (Elizabeth Street and Edward Street) - starting terminal
8. Chelsea Hotel (Gerrard Street West and Yonge Street)
9. Bond Place (Dundas Street East and Bond Street)

The route took about 1 hour and 10 minutes without accounting for traffic delays.

== Fleet ==
The Airport Express used H345 Prevost Car 45' motor coaches with seating for 56. They were powered by engines that produce 55 per cent less nitrogen oxide and 90 per cent less particulate matter than the previous models. The coaches also have improved features, including leather seats, free WiFi internet, laptop plugs and retractable seat belts.

== See also ==
- Greater Toronto Airports Authority
- Toronto Pearson International Airport
