= Student Transportation Inc. =

New Jersey school bus contractor

- Type: Private
- Industry: Student transport
- Founded: 1997, as Student Transportation of America, Ltd.
- Founder: Denis J. Gallagher
- Headquarters: Wall Township, New Jersey, United States
- Area served: United States; Canada
- Key people: Gene Kowalczewski CEO
- Services: School bus contractor
- Revenue: $1.5 billion
- Number of employees: 23,000
- Website: RideSTA.com; RideSTC.com

Student Transportation Inc., doing business as Student Transportation of America (STA) and Student Transportation of Canada (STC), is a New Jersey–based school bus contractor that focuses on rural and suburban areas. It is the second-largest school bus transportation services provider in North America, with over 22,000 vehicles that transport students in more than 225 school districts.

== History ==
Student Transportation of America was founded in 1997 by Denis J. Gallagher, who is the chairman of the company. With roots that can be traced to New Jersey's Coast Cities Bus Service established in 1922 by Gallagher's grandfather, STA successfully completed an initial public offering and its income participating securities (IPS) began trading on the Toronto Stock Exchange in December 2004.

In November 2009, the company changed its name from Student Transportation of America, Ltd., to Student Transportation Inc. It continues to use the trade names Student Transportation of America and Student Transportation of Canada.

Student Transportation has grown considerably through its "A‑B‑C-D" (Acquisition, Bid, Conversion, and Direct-to-Parent) growth strategy. Among STA's customers is the Los Angeles Unified School District, which is the second largest school district in the United States.

In 2018, Student Transportation was sold to Caisse de dépôt et placement du Québec and Ullico. It was formerly publicly traded on both the Toronto Stock Exchange and Nasdaq.

As of 15 June 2022 Student Transportation of America acquired Pacific Western Transportation Group out of Calgary, Alberta. PWT's Transit and Motorcoach operations were divested to Keolis in 2024.
