= Airport Express Train (disambiguation) =

An Airport Express Train is an airport rail link providing passenger rail transport from an airport to a nearby city.

Airport Express Trains may refer to:

- Airport Express (Beijing Subway), connecting Beijing Capital International Airport
- Airport Express (MTR), connecting Hong Kong International Airport
- Airport Express, connecting São Paulo International Airport

== See also ==
- Airport Express (disambiguation)
