= Pacific Western Transportation =

Canadian bus transport company

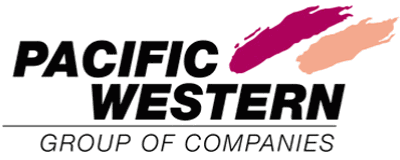

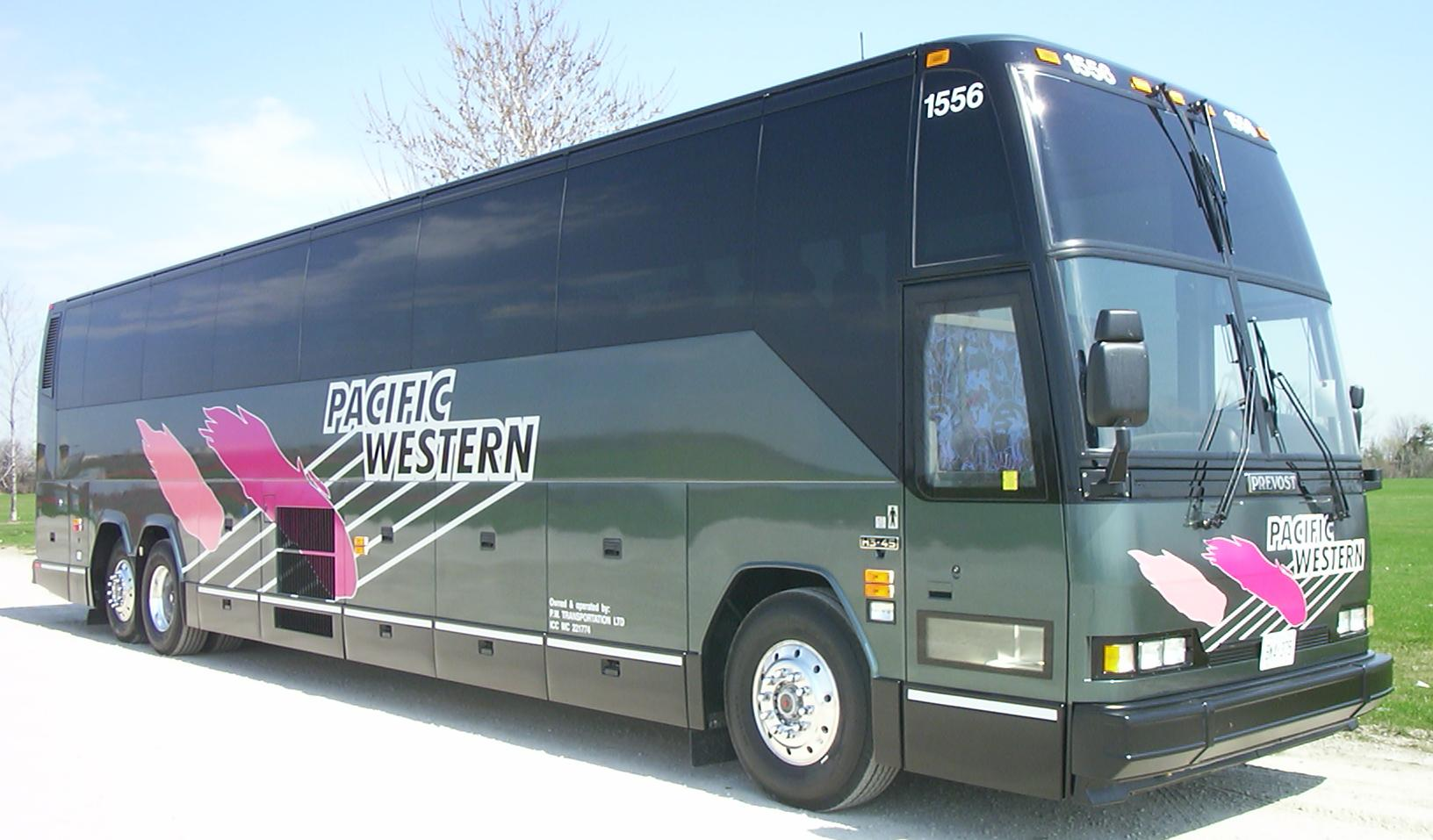
- Parent: Student Transportation Inc.
- Founded: 1958
- Headquarters: 1857 Centre Avenue, S.E.
- Locale: Calgary, Alberta
- Service area: British Columbia, Alberta, Saskatchewan, Ontario, Yukon
- Service type: charter coach, school bus, public transit, paratransit, airport express
- Website: www.pwt.ca

Pacific Western Transportation (also d/b/a P.W. Transportation) provides a variety of bus services in the Canadian provinces of British Columbia, Alberta, Saskatchewan, Ontario and Yukon. Depending on the location, it offers scheduled and chartered school busing and local and long-distance coach charters.

Since 2022, it is a subsidiary of Student Transportation of America. In July 2024, Keolis announced that it is acquiring PWT's Transit and Motorcoach operations.

== Lines of business ==
=== Employee transportation ===
==== Diversified Transportation ====
Diversified Transportation is a bus transportation company based in Fort McMurray that provides services to industry and private coach charters.

=== Student transportation ===
==== Southland Transportation ====
Southland Transportation is a Calgary based bus company that mainly provides school bus service to local school boards, and also servicing northern Alberta from Edmonton, Cold Lake, etc. North Battleford is the location of the Southland operation in Saskatchewan providing school bus services to local school boards, and industrial and contract charters.

==== Prairie Bus Lines ====
Prairie Bus Lines is based in Red Deer and provides primarily school bus services as well as industrial and charter

==== Standard Bus ====
Standard Bus is based in British Columbia.

== Discontinued ==
=== Airport Express ===
PW Airport Express was purchased after the demise of Gray Coach, which had a franchise to operate a route to the Toronto Pearson International Airport. The service connects between selected downtown Toronto locations and Pearson Airport.

The Toronto Airport Express was discontinued on October 31, 2014, due to falling ridership and the anticipated opening of the Union Pearson Express, a rail link connecting the airport to downtown Toronto.

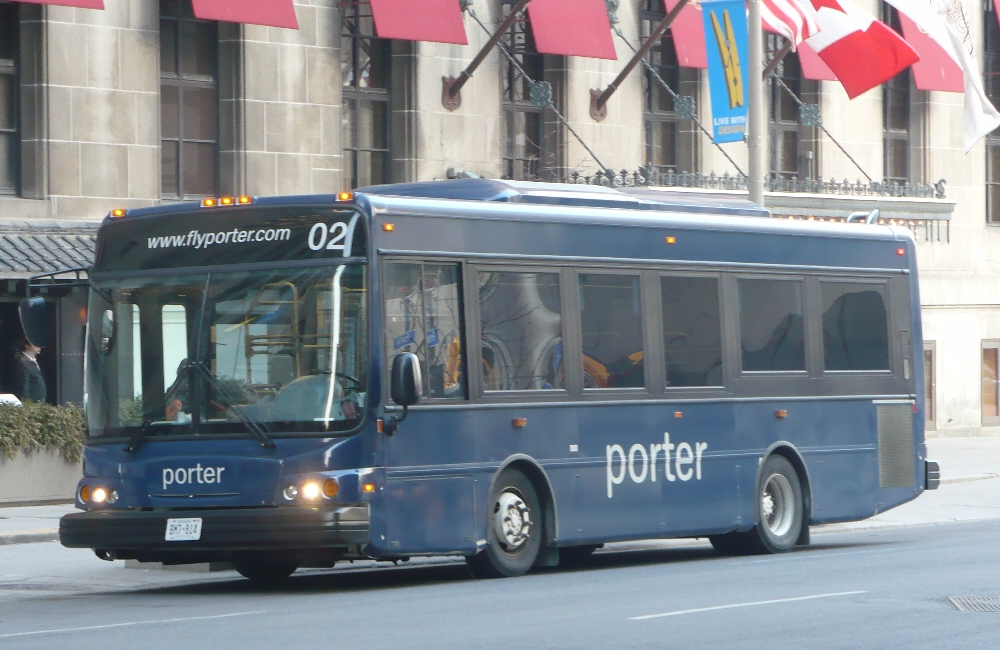
Porter shuttle bus

=== Porter shuttle ===
Porter Airlines provides a shuttle bus service for its passengers between the Royal York Hotel in downtown Toronto and to Billy Bishop Toronto City Airport. The service was operated by Pacific Western at 10-minute intervals using Thomas SLF buses, until TOK Coachlines took over this service in 2016.

=== Highway 3 Connector ===
Highway 3 Connector was a commuter bus service from Lethbridge to Medicine Hat.

=== On-It Regional Transit ===
On-It Regional Transit was a commuter bus service from Cochrane and Okotoks to Calgary, and seasonal service to Banff and Canmore.

== Incidents ==
- On December 24, 2022, an Ebus running from Kelowna to Vancouver rolled over killing 4 and sending 52 other people on board to hospital. The accident occurred on Highway 97C east of Merritt in the British Columbia Interior. The suspected cause of the accident was icy road conditions.
