= Kipling GO Station =

Railway station in Toronto, Ontario, Canada

Kipling
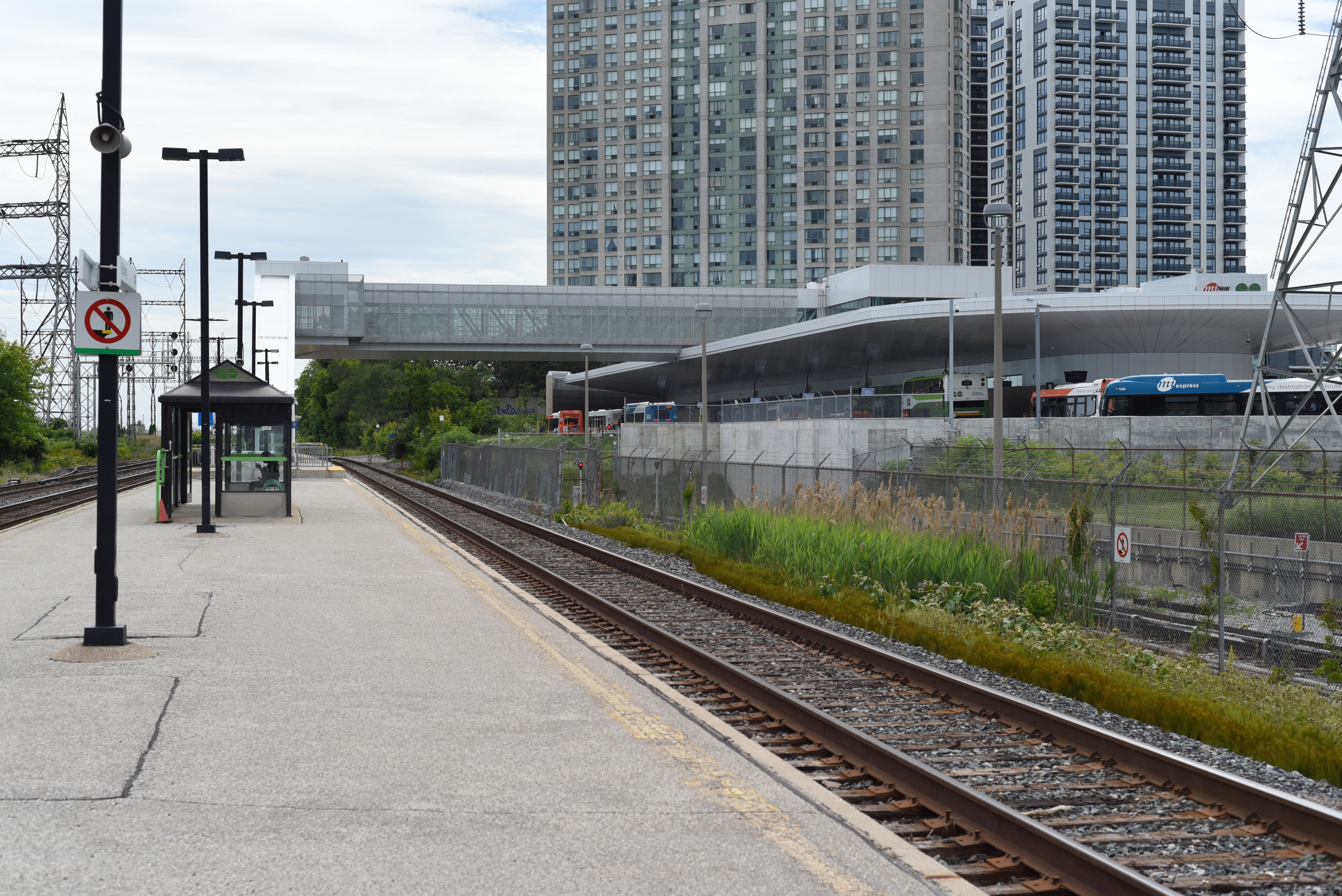
- Kipling GO Station platform looking toward the pedestrian bridge and bus terminal

General information
- Location: 27 St. Albans Road; Toronto, Ontario; Canada
- Coordinates: 43°38′10″N 79°32′13″W
- Owner: Metrolinx
- Platforms: 1 island platform
- Tracks: 3
- Connections: 900 at Kipling; at Kipling Bus Terminal

Construction
- Parking: TTC pay lot

Other information
- Station code: GO Transit: KP
- Fare zone: 03

History
- Opened: October 27, 1981; 44 years ago
- Rebuilt: 2005, 2021, 2024

Services
Preceding station	GO Transit	Following station
Dixie towards Milton	Milton	Union Terminus
Track layout
Location

Kipling GO Station is a GO Transit railway station along the Milton line rail corridor in Toronto, Ontario, Canada. It is located at 27 St. Albans Road in the Islington-City Centre West neighbourhood of Toronto (formerly Etobicoke), near Dundas Street. It is connected to Line 2 Bloor–Danforth and Toronto Transit Commission (TTC) bus services (including the 900 Airport Express to Toronto Pearson International Airport) through the adjacent Kipling subway station, as well as MiWay and GO Transit bus services through the attached Kipling Bus Terminal.

A pair of tracks serve the station, with a single island platform between them, but GO trains generally use the south tracks. This station is on a Canadian Pacific Kansas City rail corridor.

This station has two entrances; the original station building at the east end of the platform containing a ticket sales agent, which is linked to the TTC station by stairs; and, as of 2021, a pedestrian bridge crossing the tracks from the Kipling Bus Terminal on the west end. It is one of five GO stations connected directly to a TTC subway station (others being Downsview Park, Kennedy, Mount Dennis and Union). The station has no parking facilities of its own (the nearby car park is operated by the TTC).

Kipling has been wheelchair-accessible since 2005, and both entrances have elevators. It has a platform long enough for a full-length GO train of twelve Bombardier BiLevel carriages and a locomotive.
