= Islington-City Centre West =

- Neighbourhood
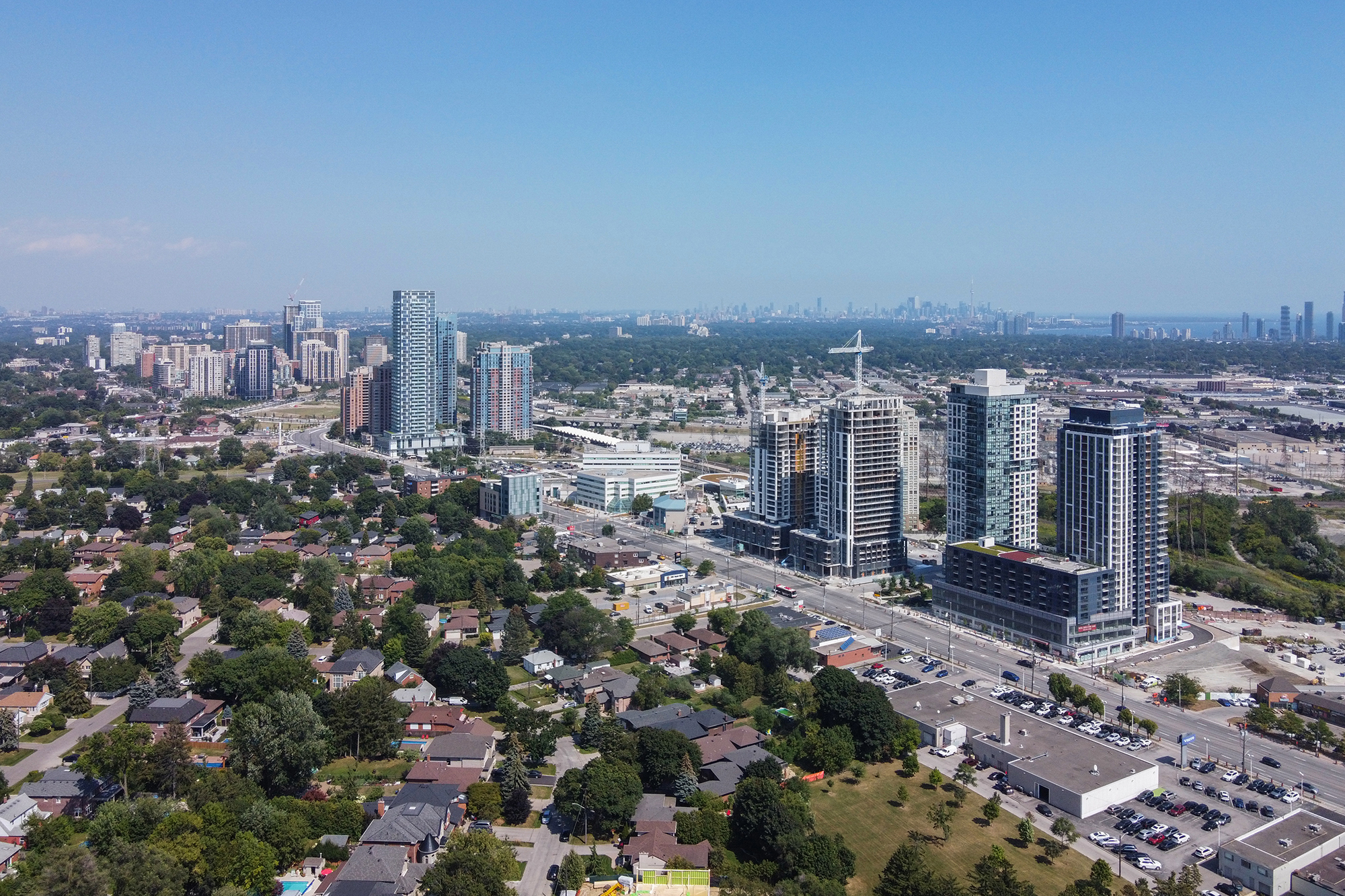
- Aerial view of Islington-City Centre West new condos in 2021
- Interactive map of Islington-City Centre West
- Coordinates: 43°38′55″N 79°31′43″W
- Country: Canada
- Province: Ontario
- City: Toronto
- Established: 1830s Settled 'Mimico', Etobicoke Twp; 1860 (Postal village) 'Islington', Etobicoke Twp
- Changed Municipality: 1954 Borough of Etobicoke from Township; 1998 Toronto from Etobicoke

Government
  - MP: James Maloney (Etobicoke—Lakeshore)
  - MPP: Lee Fairclough (Etobicoke—Lakeshore)
  - Councillor: Amber Morley (Ward 3 Etobicoke—Lakeshore)

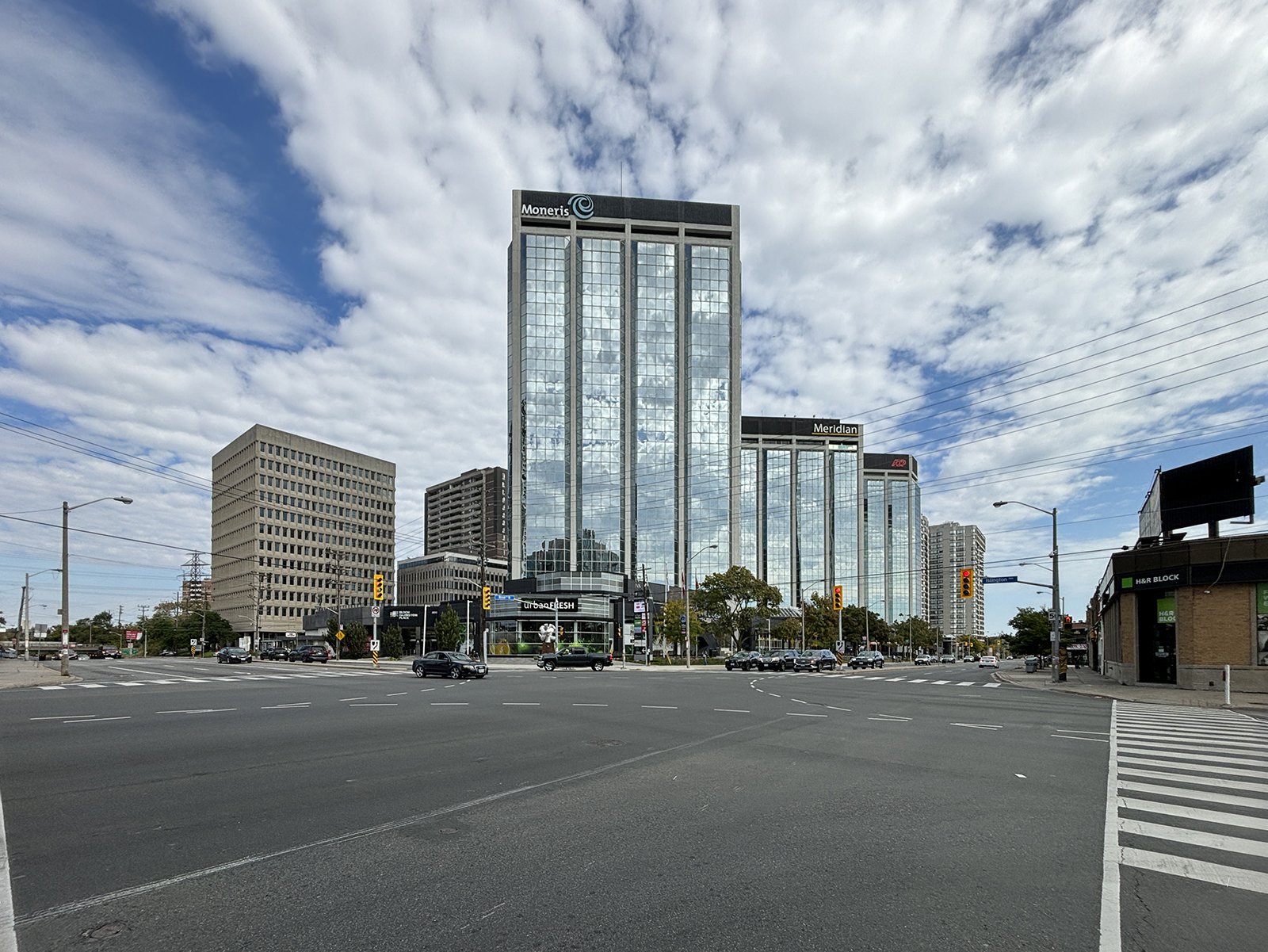
Bloor Islington Place in 2023

Islington-City Centre West (also known as Islington Village, Six Points or Etobicoke City Centre) is a commercial and residential neighbourhood in Toronto, Ontario, Canada. One of four central business districts outside Downtown Toronto, it is bounded by Rathburn Road to the north, Islington Avenue to the east, Bloor Street to the south, and Mimico Creek to the west.

== History ==
Islington centres on a commercial strip along Dundas Street West (originally The Governor's Road, the first highway connecting Toronto to London, Ontario) which runs along an escarpment (the Lake Iroquois Shoreline, ancient shore of Lake Iroquois) across the width of Etobicoke. To the west where Kipling Avenue crosses Dundas Street West (and Bloor Street West) is the Six Points intersection, the central point in Etobicoke's grid. To the east, Dundas Street crosses the Mimico Creek. The original community called Mimico grew west of Montgomery's Inn, which was built in 1832 at Dundas Street West and Islington Avenue (beside the Mimico Creek) to serve travellers coming or going from Toronto to western Ontario along Dundas St. Unlike the better-known Montgomery's Tavern in Toronto, Montgomery's Inn was used by soldiers remaining loyal to the government during the 1837 rebellion. Etobicoke was officially incorporated as a township in 1850, first using Montgomery's Inn for its meetings until the nearby original Methodist Church was purchased.

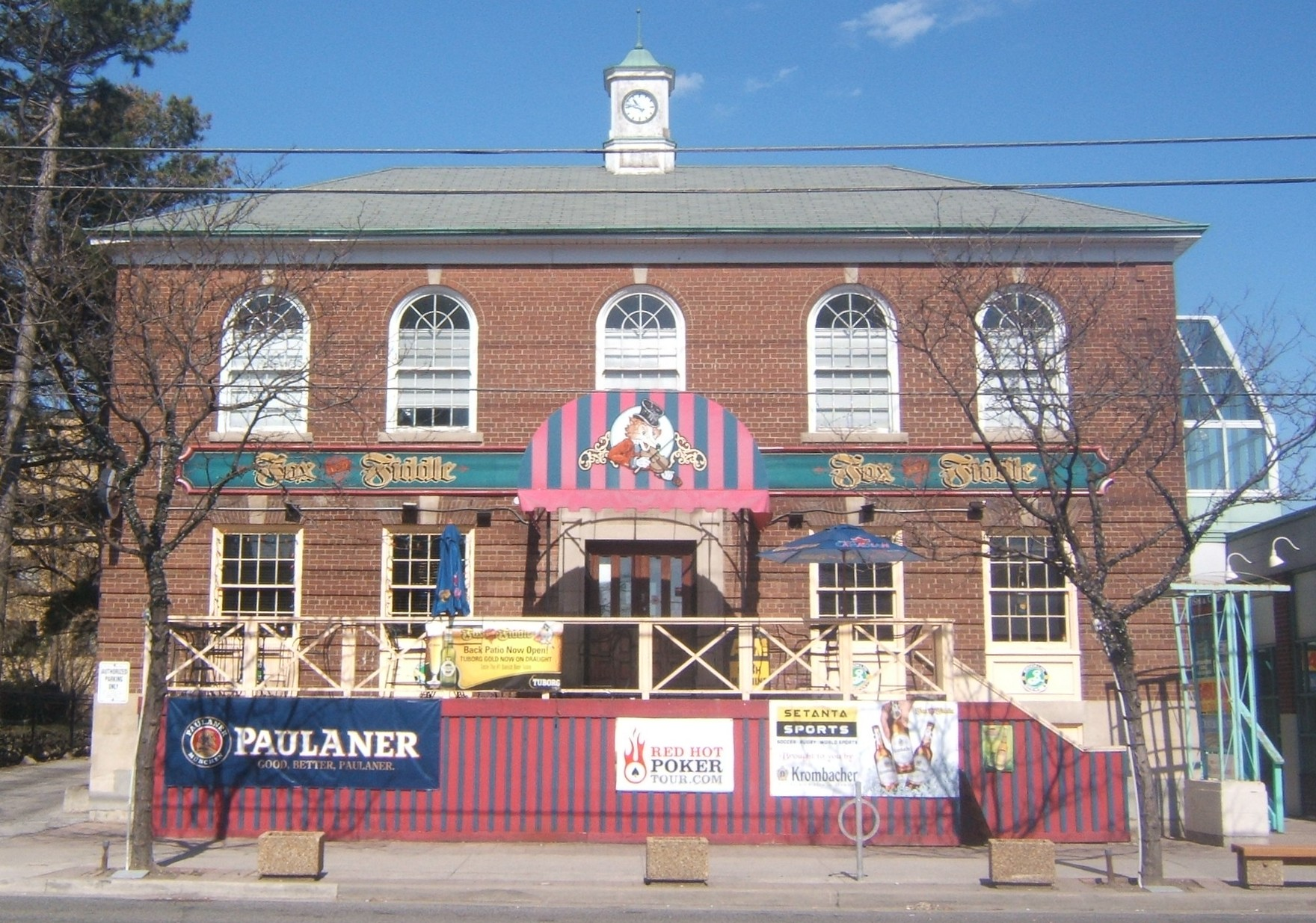
The former Etobicoke Council Offices are located in Islington.

Etobicoke's first cemetery began with the burial of a traveller on Dundas who died on his way to Toronto just before reaching Montgomery's Inn. Despite the dying man's request to be buried in Toronto, he was buried beside the Methodist Church (later the Etobicoke Council Offices) in Islington. This cemetery remains a prominent historic site in the heart of Etobicoke where many of Etobicoke's early families are buried.

With the building of the first railway to Toronto from the west in 1855, Mimico, near Lake Ontario, petitioned the government for a post office to be called Mimico in 1858. In 1860, the original northern Mimico petitioned for its own post office, using the name Islington, which was suggested by the wife of Montgomery's Innkeeper who was born in Islington, England (now a part of London). A second railway was built at the bottom of the escarpment (just south of Dundas) preventing the collapse of Islington during the railway age. This neighbourhood was also the site of Etobicoke's annual rural fair. In the early 20th century, Etobicoke's urbanizing lakeshore communities separated to become independent municipalities while Islington remained a postal village, the administrative centre of rural Etobicoke Township. The Etobicoke municipal offices were greatly enlarged at this time.

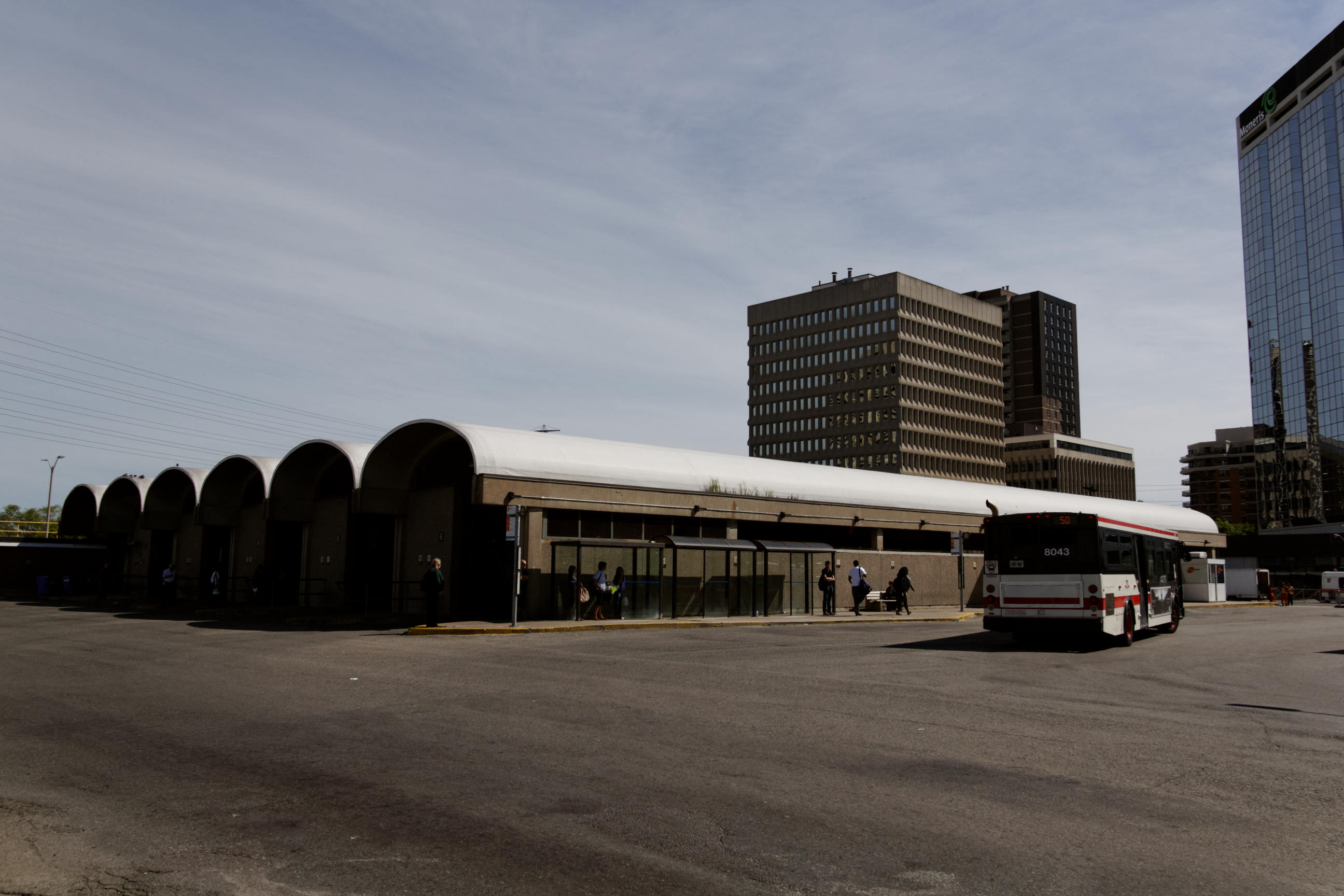
Bus platforms at Islington station, a subway station for the Toronto subway.

Urbanization began in central Etobicoke in the 1950s post war boom with growing residential areas in Islington and to the north and industrial growth to the south. This led to Etobicoke's incorporation which separated from the County of York to form a part of the new Metropolitan Toronto in 1954, reincorporating the lakeshore municipalities into that level of government. With growing traffic along Dundas and increasing traffic fatalities in Islington, the intersections of Royal York Road and Kipling Avenue with Dundas St. W. were redesigned as highway style interchanges with bridges. The new Borough of Etobicoke in 1967 created several plans to raise the level of commercial and residential density in Islington with the aim of creating a western 'downtown' for Metropolitan Toronto. The Toronto Transit Commission's Bloor–Danforth line was extended into Etobicoke as far as Islington in 1968 with the establishment of Islington station at Islington Avenue and Bloor Street West. After the station was constructed, there was a boom in high-density office and residential development. In 1980, the Bloor-Danforth line was extended one stop west from Islington to Kipling and GO Transit's Kipling GO Station, further enhancing the neighbourhood's access to Toronto and the Greater Toronto Area.

=== Six Points Junction reconfiguration ===
The physical segregation of Islington with the redesigning of the surrounding intersections on Dundas Street West (at Kipling Avenue and at Royal York Road) as well as Etobicoke Council's move in 1958 to a new complex beside the new Highway 427, limited the success of plans for the area to be developed as a western downtown. Efforts which began in 1998 by the City of Etobicoke to intensify the Six Points area were carried over to the amalgamated City of Toronto government. Redevelopment of the Six Points Junction and the Westwood Theatre lands by the Build Toronto agency began in March 2017 to create a mixed-use development.

The original Six Points Junction was an at-grade intersection of Dundas Street West, Bloor Street West, and Kipling Avenue. This at-grade intersection was replaced by a freeway-style interchange (known as the Six Points Interchange) built by Metro Toronto in 1961, which included bridge crossings over Kipling Avenue for Dundas Street West and Bloor Street West. The interchange was reconfigured from March 2017 to October 2020 to several at-grade intersections, restoring pedestrian connectivity to the area. Dundas Street has been re-routed via existing Dunbloor Road (which has been renamed Dundas Street West for continuity) on a new path through the area.

=== Heritage preservation ===
A heated debate over the demolition of the Montgomery's home (Briarly) beside Montgomery's Inn in the 1980s led to a greater emphasis on the historic nature of the area. Montgomery's Inn has been preserved as the Etobicoke Community Museum and is open to the public. There is also a designated business improvement district known as the Historic Village of Islington, which has commissioned a large number of historic wall murals along Dundas St. W.

== Education ==
The neighbourhood is home to schools operated by the public Toronto District School Board (TDSB), and the Toronto Catholic District School Board (TCDSB).

- Islington Junior Middle School (IJMS) is a K-8 elementary junior and middle school established since 1832 and it is the second oldest school in Toronto as well as the oldest in the former Etobicoke.
- Two of Etobicoke's first Roman Catholic high schools of the Our Lady of Sorrows Roman Catholic Church, St. Joseph's High School was founded in 1949 by the Sisters of St. Joseph as an all-girls school and in 1957, the Basilian Fathers formed an all-boys school, Michael Power High School on the Bloor-Dundas area and Michael Power later became a co-educational school in its later years. In 1982, they were officially amalgamated as one school with the Basilian Father as principal and the Sister of St. Joseph as vice-principal. With the school moved up west and north in 1993, Bishop Allen Academy opened in 1989 to fill in the void left by the relocation of Michael Power-St. Joseph.

== See also ==
- Neighbourhoods of Toronto
