= Kipling station =

Toronto subway station

Kipling
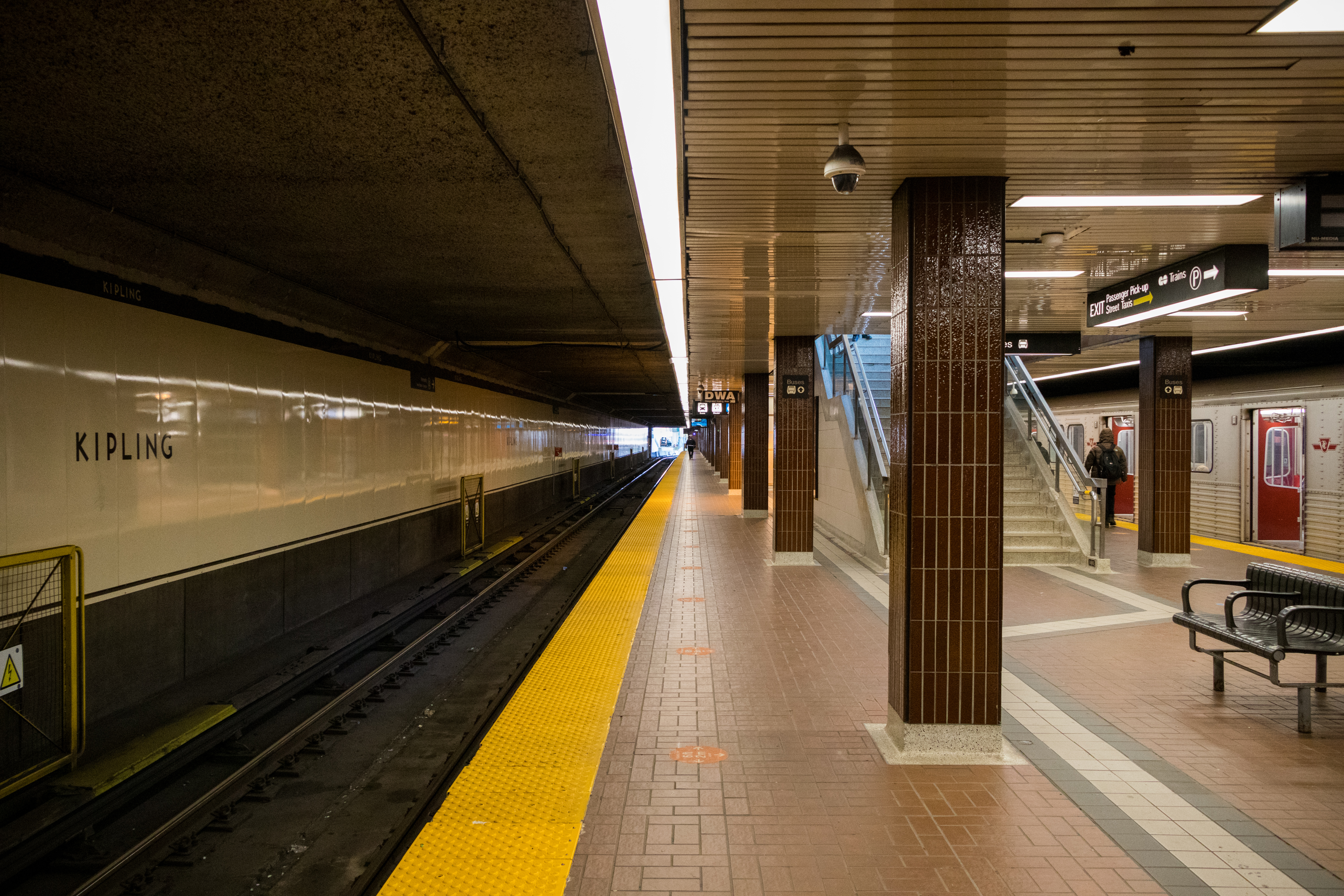

General information
- Location: 950 Kipling Avenue; Toronto, Ontario; Canada
- Coordinates: 43°38′15″N 79°32′08″W
- Platforms: Centre platform
- Tracks: 2
- Connections: 900 TTC buses; at Kipling Bus Terminal; at Kipling GO Station

Construction
- Structure type: At grade
- Parking: 1,067 spaces
- Accessible: Yes

Other information
- Website: Official station page

History
- Opened: November 21, 1980; 45 years ago
- Rebuilt: 2017

Passengers
- 2023–2024: 49,392
- Rank: 8 of 70

Services
Preceding station	Toronto Transit Commission	Following station
Terminus	Line 2 Bloor–Danforth	Islington towards Kennedy
Track layout
Location

Kipling is the western terminus station of Line 2 Bloor–Danforth of the Toronto subway system. The station is served by buses and subway trains operated by the Toronto Transit Commission and is adjacent to the Kipling GO Station on the Milton line of GO Transit and the Kipling Bus Terminal, where passengers can connect with MiWay and GO Transit bus services. It opened on November 21, 1980, as part of the extensions west, to this station, and east to Kennedy station. It is located in the Islington–City Centre West neighbourhood on St. Albans Road at Aukland Road, west of the overpass of Kipling Avenue, after which the station is named. The 900 Airport Express bus route connects Kipling to the Toronto Pearson International Airport.

== History ==
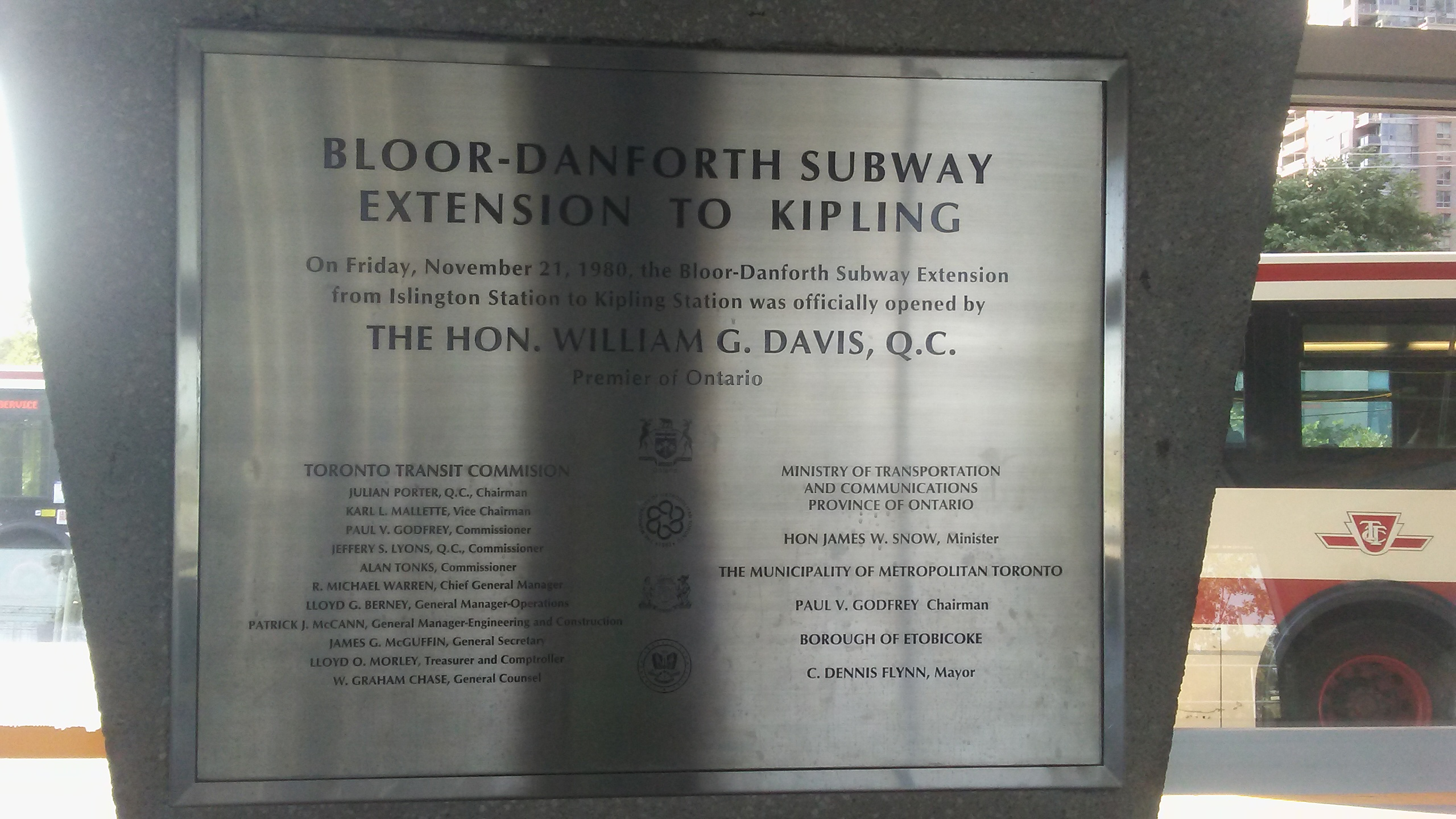
Plaque commemorating the 1980 Bloor-Danforth extension to Kipling

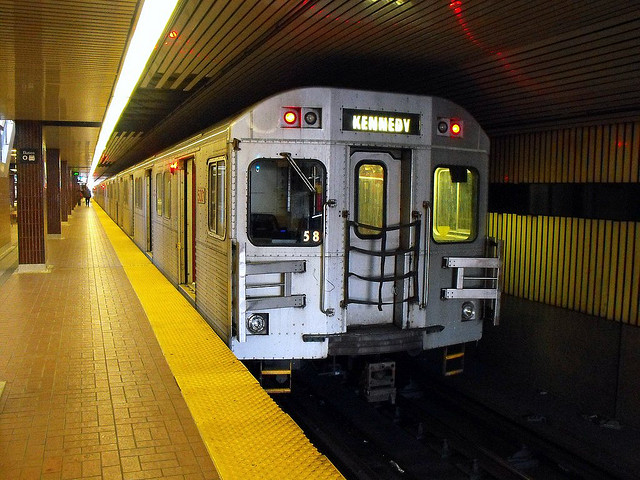
A train in the station, with the original wall slats visible, in 2009

An official opening ceremony for Kipling and Kennedy stations, in what was then the Borough of Etobicoke, was held on November 21, 1980. This pair of one-stop extensions at opposite ends of the Bloor–Danforth line were opened to the public the following day. Kipling and Kennedy were designed similarly, with both stations having an island platform that is typical of terminal stations. The outer platform walls at Kipling were originally two rows of vertical yellow vinyl slats separated by a black strip showing the station's name in Univers font. This wall treatment was replaced by off-white fitted enamelled panels using the traditional Toronto Subway font with black trim with smaller lettering along the top in a 2017 renovation, evoking the older stations along the line.

In 1999, this station became accessible with the addition of elevators, one of the first accessible stations in the city.

As a result of the initial lack of urban development near the station, and its location near a hydro substation, it was originally designed around commuter travel, with a large amount of parking spaces (over 1,300) and a roughed-in platform for a future light rail or light metro line, like the Scarborough RT at Kennedy.

In the early 2020s, a new regional bus terminal was built on the site of the Kipling North commuter parking lot. Serving both MiWay and GO Transit, the bus terminal opened in 2021. An underground tunnel links the subway station to the regional bus terminal, and an accessible link bridge connects to the Kipling GO Station. As of 2022, 1,067 commuter parking spaces remain, located south of the station in the hydro corridor.

== Facilities ==
The main entrance is located at the west end of the station, with access to the GO station, commuter parking lots, and a kiss and ride area for passenger drop-off. An entrance at the east end makes the bus platform level accessible by way of a ramp, with an elevator providing a connection with the train platform below. Fares can be paid for at this station by using tokens, tickets, passes, as well as the Presto card. Currently it serves the high density residential and commercial developments that are being built, while acting as a hub for commuter travel.

Above the subway tracks on the south side of the station, opposite the bus bays on the same level, is an unfinished platform for a proposed but never-built Etobicoke RT line similar to Line 3 Scarborough.

East of the station towards Islington, the line continues on the surface alongside the railway right-of-way which parallels Dundas Street at a distance. It crosses over Bloor Street to the north side alongside the railway tracks, then dives underground below the tracks and turns parallel to Bloor.

=== Kipling Yard ===
Currently the tail end tracks west of the station can be used to store 2 car trainsets.

There were plans to establish a yard to replace Greenwood Yard (and allow Greenwood to be dedicated to the since-abandoned Relief Line) and potential exists for Metrolinx and the TTC to purchase land on the former CPR Obico Yard bounded by Shorncliffe Road and North Queen Street for a shared storage facility for subway cars and GO trains. Most of the former CPR intermodal yard, an open area not occupied by structures, is now owned by the City of Toronto and been partially used to store TTC buses since 2019 as North Queen Yard and other yards were leased out.

== Surface connections ==
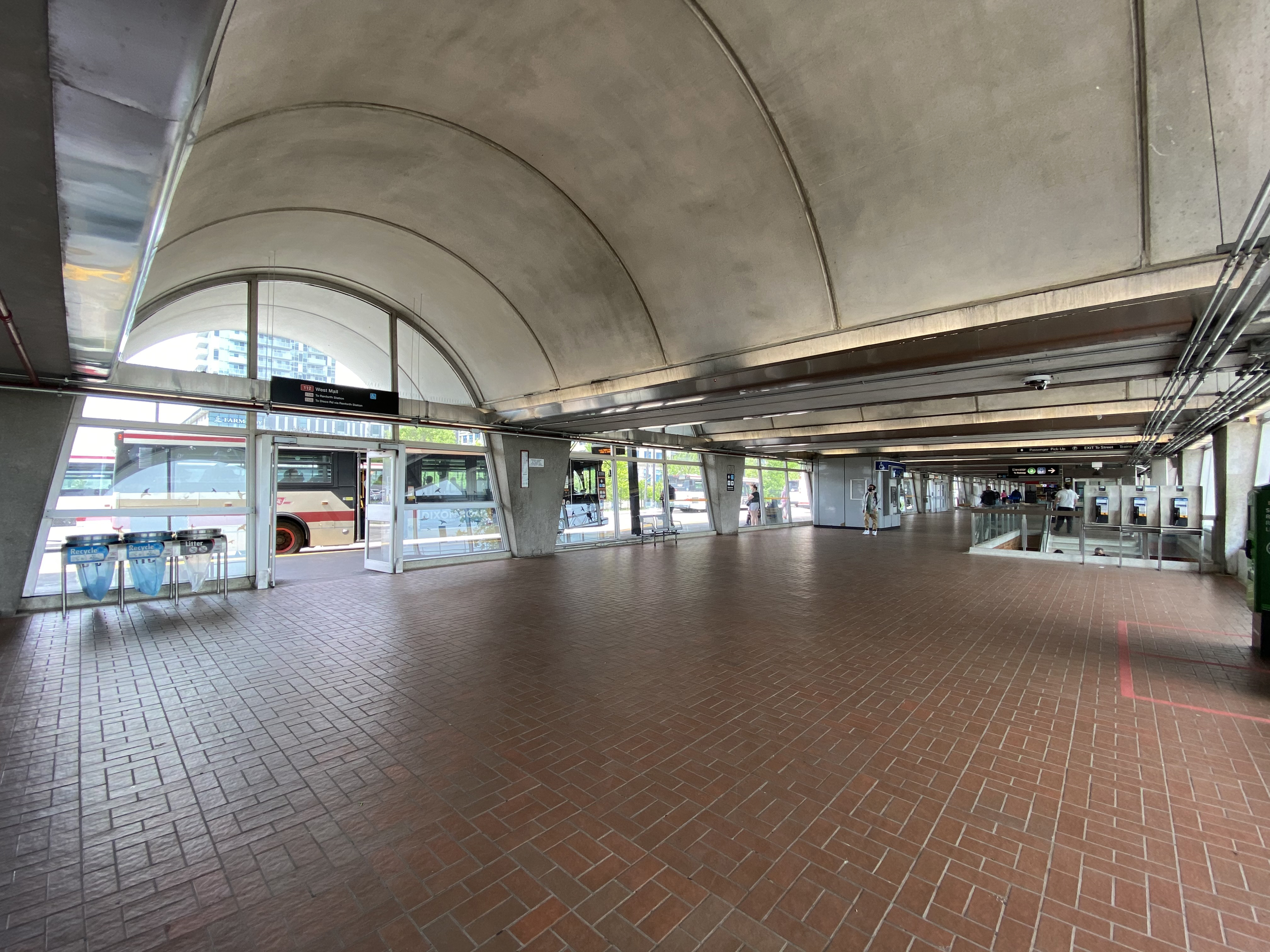
Kipling station concourse

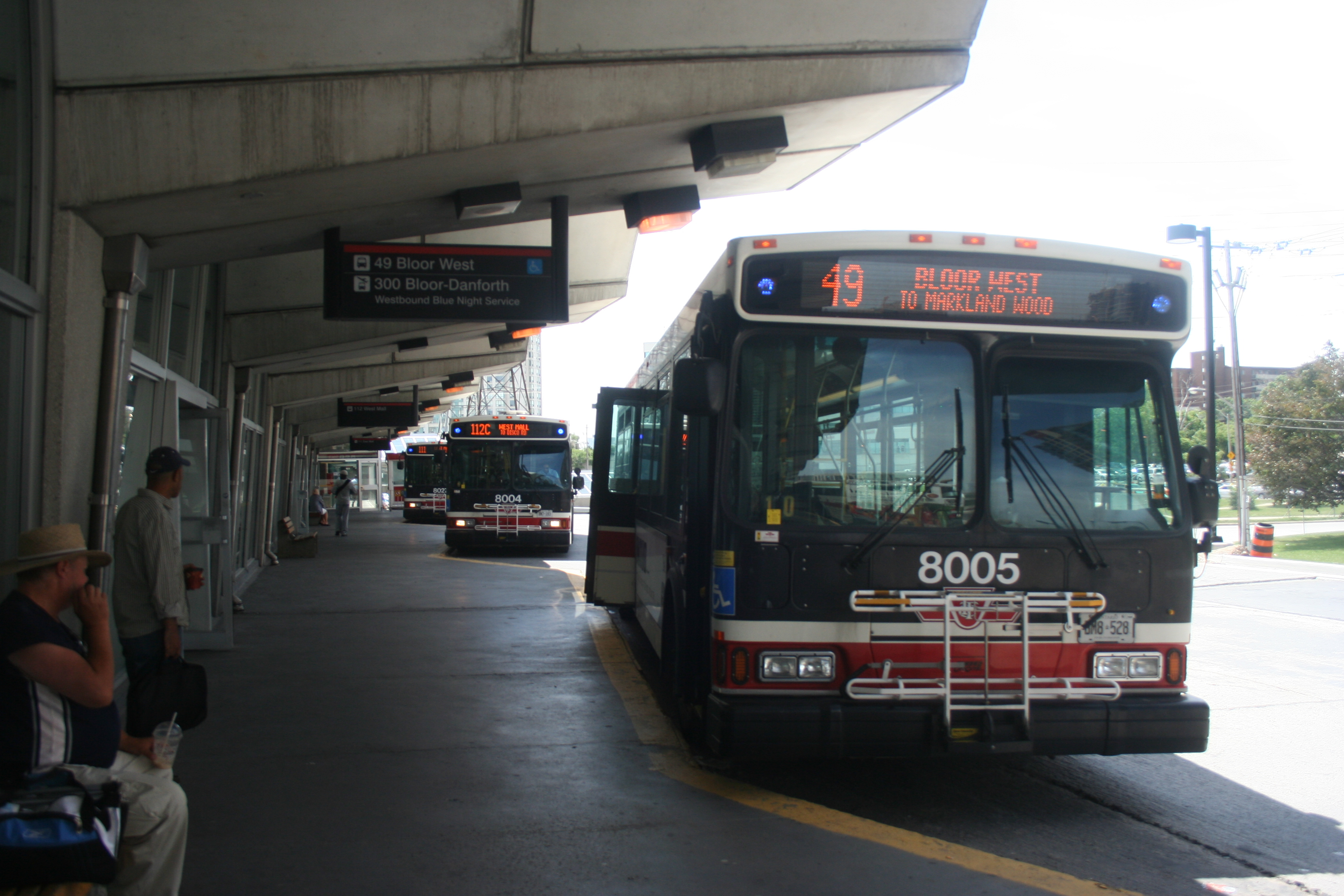
Bus bays are a level above the subway trains on the north side of the station.

The TTC bus platform is in the fare-paid zone, allowing passengers to quickly transfer between the subway and the following TTC bus routes:

Bay	Route	Name	Additional information
1	111	East Mall	Northbound to Eglinton Avenue West (Willowridge & Richgrove)
2	112B	West Mall	Northbound to Renforth station
2	112C	West Mall	Northbound to Disco Road
3	123B	Sherway	Southbound to Long Branch Loop via Shorncliffe Road and the East Mall
3	123C	Sherway	Southbound to Long Branch Loop via Shorncliffe Road and North Queen Street
3	123D	Sherway	Southbound to Sherway Gardens via Shorncliffe Road and the East Mall
3	123F	Sherway	Southbound to Sherway Gardens via the West Mall (Rush hour service)
3	Wheel-Trans		
4	149	Etobicoke-Bloor	Eastbound to Jane station
4	900	Airport Express	Northbound to Toronto Pearson International Airport
4	300A	Bloor–Danforth Blue Night	Westbound to Toronto Pearson International Airport
4	300B	Bloor–Danforth Blue Night	Westbound to the West Mall & Burnhamthorpe Road
5	40A	Junction–Dundas West	Eastbound to Dundas West station
5	49	Bloor West	Westbound to Markland Wood (east of the Etobicoke Creek)
6	44	Kipling South	Southbound to Lake Shore Boulevard and Humber College Lakeshore campus
6	944	Kipling South Express	Southbound to Lake Shore Boulevard and Humber College Lakeshore campus (Weekday service)
7	927A	Highway 27 Express	Northbound to Humber College North Campus
7	927B	Highway 27 Express	Northbound to Steeles Avenue West
7	927C	Highway 27 Express	Northbound to Humber College via Attwell Drive (Rush hour service)
7	927D	Highway 27 Express	Northbound to Steeles Avenue West and Signal Hill Avenue via Royalcrest Road (Rush hour service)
8	46	Martin Grove	Northbound to Steeles Avenue West
8	300A	Bloor–Danforth Blue Night	Eastbound to Warden Avenue & Danforth Road
8	300B	Bloor–Danforth Blue Night	Eastbound to Kennedy station
9	45A	Kipling	Northbound to Steeles Avenue West past Etobicoke North GO Station
9	45B	Kipling	Northbound to Carlingview Drive via Belfield Road
10	945	Kipling Express	Northbound to Steeles Avenue West (Rush hour service)

- Some 300 Bloor–Danforth trips do not enter the bus terminal, but can be accessed at Aukland Road at Dundas Street.
- A courtesy bus used to be operated by IKEA between Kipling station and the IKEA Etobicoke store. However, service was discontinued due to the COVID-19 pandemic.
