= Airport Link =

Airport Link or Airport Link line may refer to:

- Airport Link, Brisbane, a tolled motorway tunnel in Brisbane, Australia
- Airport Link, Sydney, a railway line in Sydney, Australia
- Airport Link Company, a railway station operator in Sydney, Australia
- Airport Link, or Line 4, a light rail line in Ottawa, Canada
- Airport Link Line, a railway line in Shanghai, China
- Airport Rail Link, a railway line in Bangkok, Thailand
- Airport Link, or Line 1, a light rail line in Seattle, United States

For a more general list of rail links to airports, see List of airport rail link systems.
