= List of tallest buildings in Mississauga =

Skyline of Mississauga
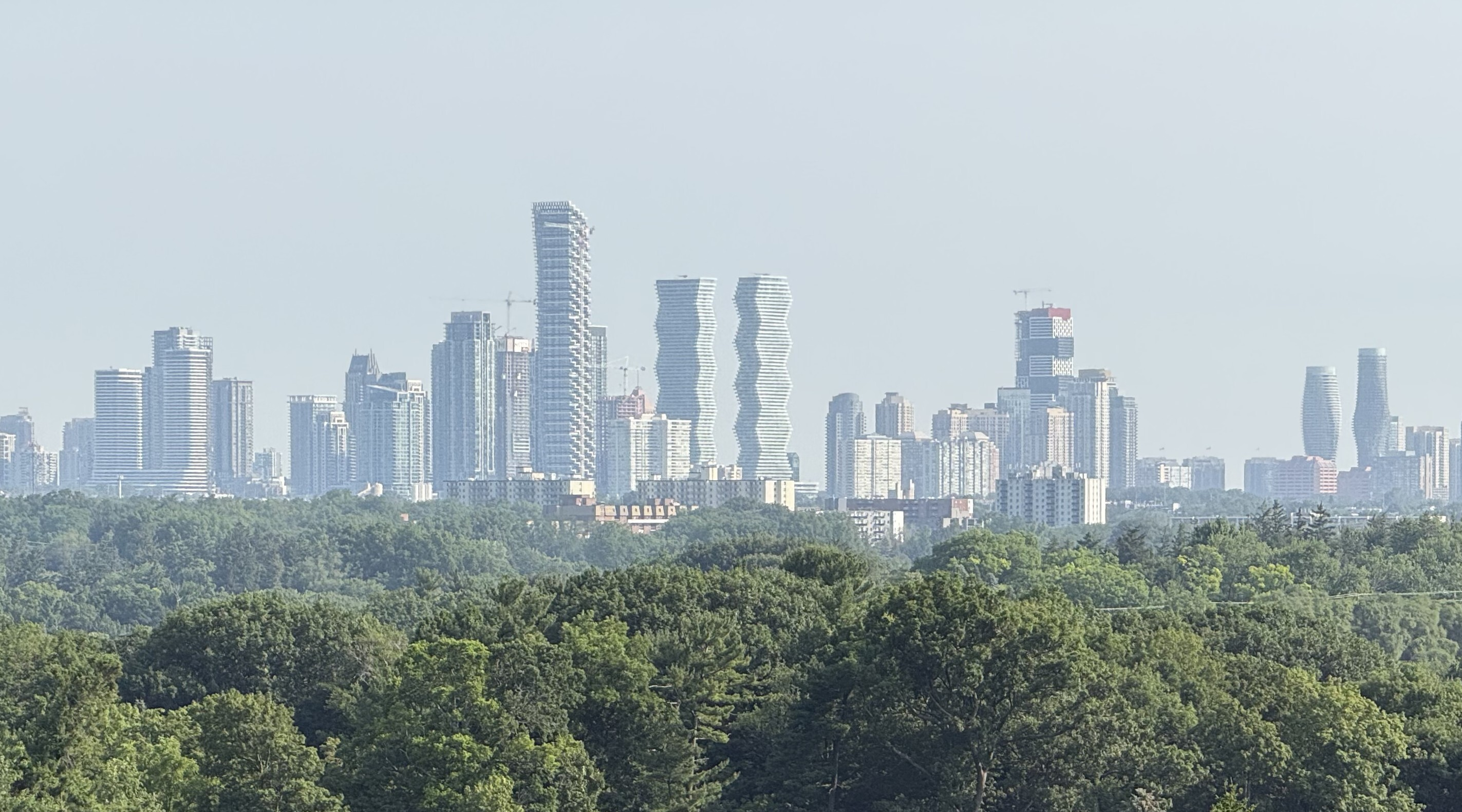
- View of Mississauga City Centre in 2026
- Tallest building: M3 at M City Condominiums (2026)
- Tallest building height: 260.3 m (854 ft)
- Major clusters: Mississauga City Centre
- First 150 m+ building: Absolute World South (2012)

Number of tall buildings (2026)
- Taller than 100 m (328 ft): 46
- Taller than 150 m (492 ft): 7
- Taller than 200 m (656 ft): 2

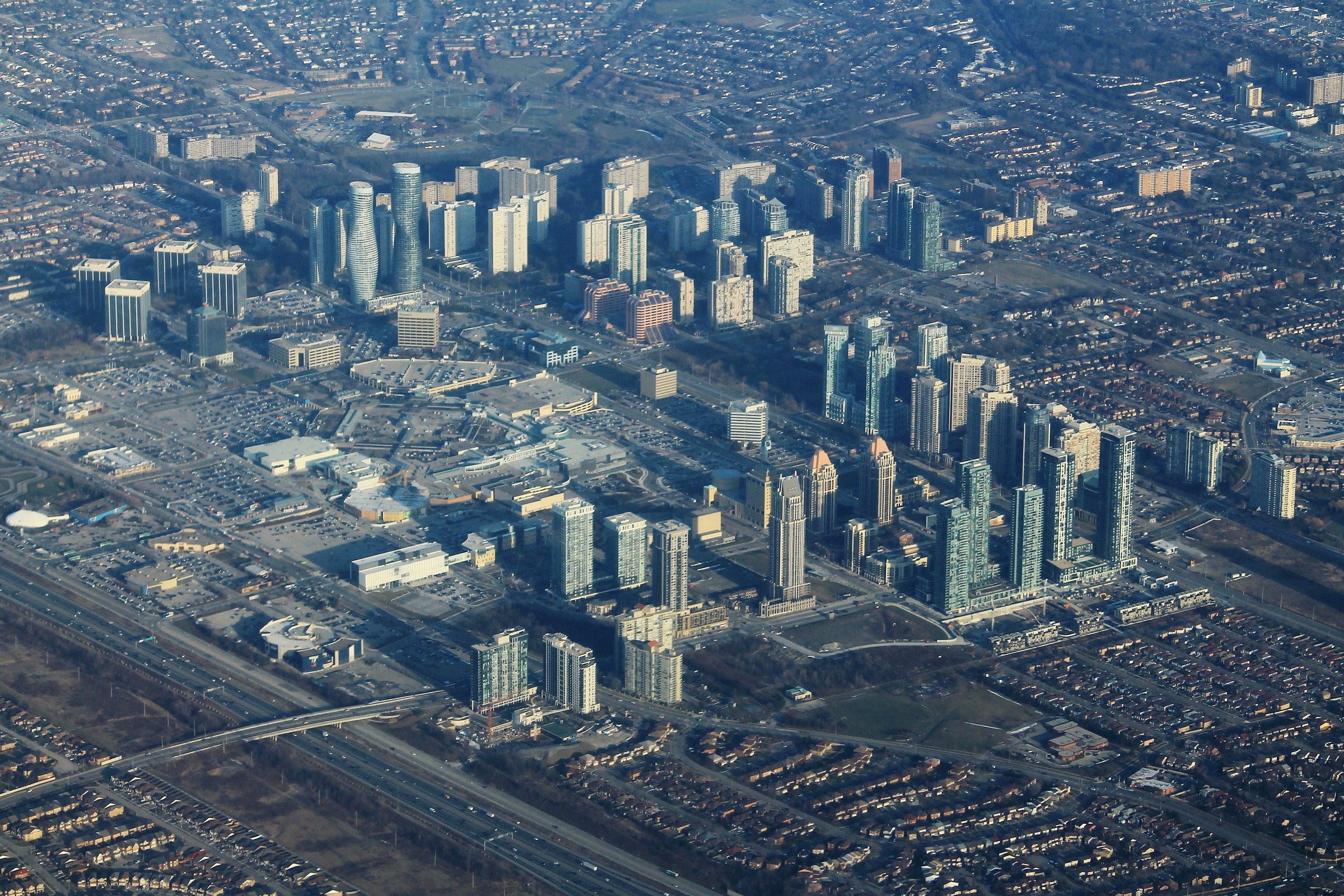
Aerial view of Mississauga's skyscrapers surrounding Square One Shopping Centre

Mississauga is a city in Southern Ontario in Canada, and the second most populous city in the Greater Toronto Area (GTA) after Toronto itself, with 717,961 inhabitants as of 2021. Since the 2000s, there have been an increasing number of skyscrapers and high-rises built in Mississauga, almost all of which is residential. As of 2026, Mississauga is home to 46 buildings taller than 100 m (328 ft), seven of which have a height greater than 150 m (492 ft). The tallest building in the city is M3, a 260 m (854 ft), 81-storey building topped out in 2026 and planned to be completed the same year. Alongside Vaughan, Mississauga has one of the largest collections of tall buildings in the GTA outside of Toronto.

Developed as a suburb of Toronto, Mississauga's growth is attributed to its proximity to that city. However, Mississauga's extensive corporate and industrial employment opportunities differentiate it from most suburban bedroom communities. The first high-rises in the city appeared in the early 1970s, which each subsequent decade resulting in increased building heights. Between 2000 and 2010, Mississauga's skyline grew from having one high-rise taller than 100 m (328 ft) to 19.

In 2006, developers Fernbrook & Citizen held an international architectural design competition for a high-rise condominium complex. The winning submission by MAD Architects was realized as Absolute World. Featuring two twisting, sinuous skyscrapers, the complex was completed in 2012. They remained the tallest buildings in Mississauga until 2023, upon the completion of M2 and its slightly shorter companion, M1. M2, M1, and M3 are part of M City Condominiums, an eight-tower, 15-acre, 4.3 million square foot mixed-use community. The tallest building in the development, M3 topped out in 2026. At a height of 260 m (854 ft), it is currently the tallest building in Mississauga and in all of Canada outside of Toronto.

Mississauga's tallest buildings are concentrated in Mississauga City Centre, forming a ring of high-rises that surround Square One Shopping Centre, the second largest shopping centre in Canada. The shopping centre is attached to City Centre Transit Terminal, the main transit hub and bus station for MiWay, the city's public transit system. A number of towers sit alongside Hurontario Street, which runs northwest-southeast through the city. The lakeside neighbourhood of Port Credit also has a small grouping of high-rises, none of which exceed 100 m (328 ft) in height.

== History ==
Number of buildings by height in Mississauga by the end of each year, based on the list below. Click on the legend to toggle a specific height on or off. View chart definition.

== Map of tallest buildings ==
The maps below show the location of every building taller than 100 m (328 ft) in Mississauga. Each marker is numbered by the building's height rank, and coloured by the decade of its completion.

Buildings taller than 100 m (328 ft) in Mississauga.
- 1990s
- 2000s
- 2010s
- 2020s
1 M3
2 M2
3 M1
4 Absolute World South
5 Avia 1
6 Absolute World North
7 Pinnacle Grand Park II
8 PSV1
9 Stak36 Condominiums at Square One District
10 One Park Tower
11 The Grand Residences
12 Edge Towers 2
13 Wesley Tower
14 Avia 2
15 PSV 2
16 Chicago
17 Gemma Condominiums at Pinnacle Uptown
18 Solstice
19 Edge Towers I
20 The Residences
21 The Park Residences
22 Onyx
23 Widesuites
24 Mississauga Square
25 The Park Mansion
26 Absolute Vision
27 Perla Tower II
28 The Capital North
29 Canopy Towers
30 Skymark West - North
31 Skymark West - South
32 Dialogue Rental Residences at Square One District
33 Citygate East
34 Citygate West
35 The Capital South
36 Elle at Eden Park
37 Block 9 South
38 Eden Park
39 Grand Ovation
40 185 Enfield
41 Ultra Ovation
42 No. 1 City Centre East
43 Eve
44 A2 at Absolute City Centre
45 Limelight Condominiums Phase 2
46 Pinnacle Grand Park I

== Tallest buildings ==
This list ranks completed buildings in Mississauga that stand at least 100 m (328 ft) tall as of 2025, based on standard height measurement. This includes spires and architectural details but does not include antenna masts. The “Year” column indicates the year of completion. Estimated heights are in italics. Buildings tied in height are sorted by year of completion with earlier buildings ranked first, and then alphabetically.

Was the tallest building in Mississauga upon completion
Architecturally topped out but not yet completed

Rank	Name	Image	Location	Height m (ft)	Floors	Year	Purpose	Notes
1	M3 Condominiums		43°35′00″N 79°38′47″W	260.3 (854)	81	2026	Residential	Tallest building in Mississauga since 2026 and tallest building in Canada outside of Toronto. Part of the M City Condominiums complex.
2	M2 Condominiums		43°35′01″N 79°38′39″W	200 (656)	62	2023	Residential	Tallest building in Mississauga from 2023 to 2026. Part of the M City Condominiums complex. First building in Mississauga to exceed 200 m (656 ft) in height.
3	M1 Condominiums		43°35′05″N 79°38′42″W	199.2 (654)	62	2023	Residential	Part of the M City Condominiums complex.
4	Absolute World South		43°35′40″N 79°38′07″W	175.6 (576)	56	2012	Residential	Tallest building in Mississauga from 2012 to 2023. Also known as 60 Absolute World. First building in Mississauga to exceed 150 m (492 ft) in height, along with Absolute World North.
5	Avia 1	–	43°35′19″N 79°39′01″W	171 (561) (Note: This figure is an estimate from The Skyscraper Center.)	50	2025	Residential	
6	Absolute World North		43°35′42″N 79°38′09″W	157.9 (518)	50	2012	Residential	Also known as 50 Absolute World. First building in Mississauga to exceed 150 m (492 ft) in height, along with Absolute World South.
7	Pinnacle Grand Park II	–	43°34′52″N 79°38′50″W	152.4 (500)	48	2017	Residential	
8	PSV1	–	43°35′06″N 79°38′45″W	145 (476)	47	2017	Residential	Also more fully known as PSV at Parkside Village.
9	Stak36 Condominiums at Square One District	–	43°35′22″N 79°39′01″W	144 (472) (Note: Sources do not state the exact height of this building. This figure is an estimated minimum height based on the number of above-ground floors, assuming a height of 3 metres (9.8 feet) per floor. This figure may change as more data becomes available.)	48	2026	Residential	
10	One Park Tower		43°35′17″N 79°38′53″W	142 (466)	38	2008	Residential	Tallest building in Mississauga from 2008 to 2012.
11	The Grand Residences		43°35′11″N 79°38′50″W	139 (456)	45	2014	Residential	
12	Edge Towers 2	–	43°35′23″N 79°37′54″W	137 (449)	40	2024	Residential	
13	Wesley Tower	–	43°35′12″N 79°38′47″W	135 (443)	43	2021	Residential	Also more fully known as Wesley Tower at Daniels City Center.
14	Avia 2	–	43°35′16″N 79°39′01″W	130 (430)	38	2025	Residential	Also more fully known as Avia 2 at Parkside Village.
15	PSV 2	–	43°35′08″N 79°38′47″W	127 (417)	42	2017	Residential	Also more fully known as PSV 2 at Parkside Village.
16	Chicago		43°35′20″N 79°38′58″W	125 (410)	41	2010	Residential	
17	Gemma Condominiums at Pinnacle Uptown	–	43°36′28″N 79°39′20″W	120.3 (395)	38	2026	Residential	
18	Solstice	–	43°35′15″N 79°38′24″W	121 (397)	38	2008	Residential	
19	Edge Towers I	–	43°35′21″N 79°37′56″W	120 (390)	35	2023	Residential	
20	The Residences	–	43°35′09″N 79°38′50″W	118 (387)	36	2013	Residential	Also more fully known as The Residences at Parkside Village.
21	The Park Residences		43°35′11″N 79°38′53″W	118 (387)	36	2014	Residential	Also more fully known as The Park Residences at Parkside Village.
22	Onyx	–	43°35′18″N 79°38′23″W	116.8 (383)	36	2010	Residential	
23	Widesuites	–	43°35′31″N 79°38′04″W	114.6 (376)	35	2011	Residential	
24	Mississauga Square	–	43°36′34″N 79°39′21″W	113 (371)	33	2022	Residential	
25	The Park Mansion		43°36′14″N 79°39′08″W	112.4 (369)	36	1990	Residential	Tallest building in Mississauga from 1990 to 2008. First building in Mississauga to exceed 100 m (328 ft) in height.
26	Absolute Vision	–	43°35′44″N 79°38′05″W	112 (367)	35	2009	Residential	
27	Perla Tower II	–	43°36′27″N 79°39′22″W	111.9 (367)	34	2021	Residential	Also more fully known as Perla Tower II at Pinnacle Uptown.
28	The Capital North	–	43°35′17″N 79°38′45″W	110 (360)	31	2006	Residential	
29	Canopy Towers	–	43°36′32″N 79°39′19″W	109.5 (359)	38	2026	Residential	
30	Skymark West - North	–	43°36′17″N 79°39′05″W	109 (358)	34	2001	Residential	
31	Skymark West - South	–	43°36′15″N 79°39′02″W	109 (358)	34	2002	Residential	
32	Dialogue Rental Residences at Square One District	–	43°35′23″N 79°39′02″W	108 (354)	36	2026	Residential	Formerly known as Stak36 II at Square One District.
33	Citygate East	–	43°35′19″N 79°38′24″W	107.9 (354)	34	2004	Residential	
34	Citygate West	–	43°35′17″N 79°38′27″W	107.9 (354)	34	2004	Residential	
35	The Capital South	–	43°35′15″N 79°38′42″W	107 (351)	30	2006	Residential	
36	Elle at Eden Park	–	43°35′19″N 79°37′54″W	107 (351)	31	2010	Residential	
37	Block 9 South	–	43°35′08″N 79°38′52″W	106.5 (349)	34	2020	Residential	Also known more fully as Block 9 South at Parkside Village.
38	Eden Park	–	43°35′23″N 79°37′50″W	106 (348)	33	2007	Residential	
39	Grand Ovation	–	43°35′12″N 79°38′32″W	106 (348)	34	2008	Residential	
40	185 Enfield	–	43°35′30″N 79°38′05″W	105 (344)	35	2024	Residential	
41	Ultra Ovation	–	43°35′10″N 79°38′35″W	104.5 (343)	32	2010	Residential	
42	No. 1 City Centre East	–	43°35′28″N 79°37′56″W	101 (331)	31	2004	Residential	
43	Eve	–	43°35′20″N 79°37′51″W	101 (331)	32	2009	Residential	Also marketed as Eve at Eden Park.
44	A2 at Absolute City Centre	–	43°35′42″N 79°38′04″W	100.6 (330)	31	2007	Residential	
45	Limelight Condominiums Phase 2	–	43°35′23″N 79°38′53″W	100 (328)	32	2012	Residential	
46	Pinnacle Grand Park I	–	43°34′54″N 79°38′54″W	100 (328)	28	2014	Residential	

== Tallest under construction or proposed ==
=== Under construction ===
The following table includes buildings under construction in Mississauga that are planned to be at least 100 m (328 ft) tall as of 2026, based on standard height measurement. The “Year” column indicates the expected year of completion. Buildings whose exact planned heights are unknown are included if they have more than 33 stories. Buildings that are on hold are not included.

Name	Height m (ft)	Floors	Year	Purpose	Notes
Exchange District Condos, EX4	232 (761)	72	2027	Residential	
M4	215.6 (707)	67	2028	Residential	
Exchange District Condos, EX1	201 (659)	60	2026	Residential	
Oro, at Edge Towers	170 (560)	55	2027	Residential	
Voya I at Parkside Village	142.3 (467)	44	2026	Residential	
Exchange District Condos, EX2	136 (446)	42	2026	Residential	
M5	123 (404)	36	2027	Residential	
Alba	109.1 (358)	32	2026	Residential	
Voya II at Parkside Village	–	38	2026	Residential	

== Timeline of tallest buildings ==
Name	Image	Years as tallest	Height m (ft)	Floors	Notes
The Park Mansion		1990–2008	112.4 (369)	36	
One Park Tower		2008–2012	142 (466)	38	
Absolute World South		2012–2023	175.6 (576)	56	
M2		2023–2026	200 (660)	81	
M3		2026–present	260.3 (854)	62	

== See also ==
- List of tallest buildings in Canada
- List of tallest buildings in Ontario
- List of tallest buildings in Toronto
- List of tallest buildings in Vaughan
- List of tallest buildings in London, Ontario
- List of tallest buildings in Hamilton, Ontario
- Canadian architecture
- Mississauga City Centre
