= M City =

M City may refer to:

- Manchester City F.C., a football club in England sometimes referred to as "Man City"
- M-City J.r. (born 1991 or 1992), American rapper
- M City Condominiums, a planned group of condominiums in Mississauga

== See also ==
- Mcity
- My City (disambiguation)
