= Mississauga City Centre =

- City centre
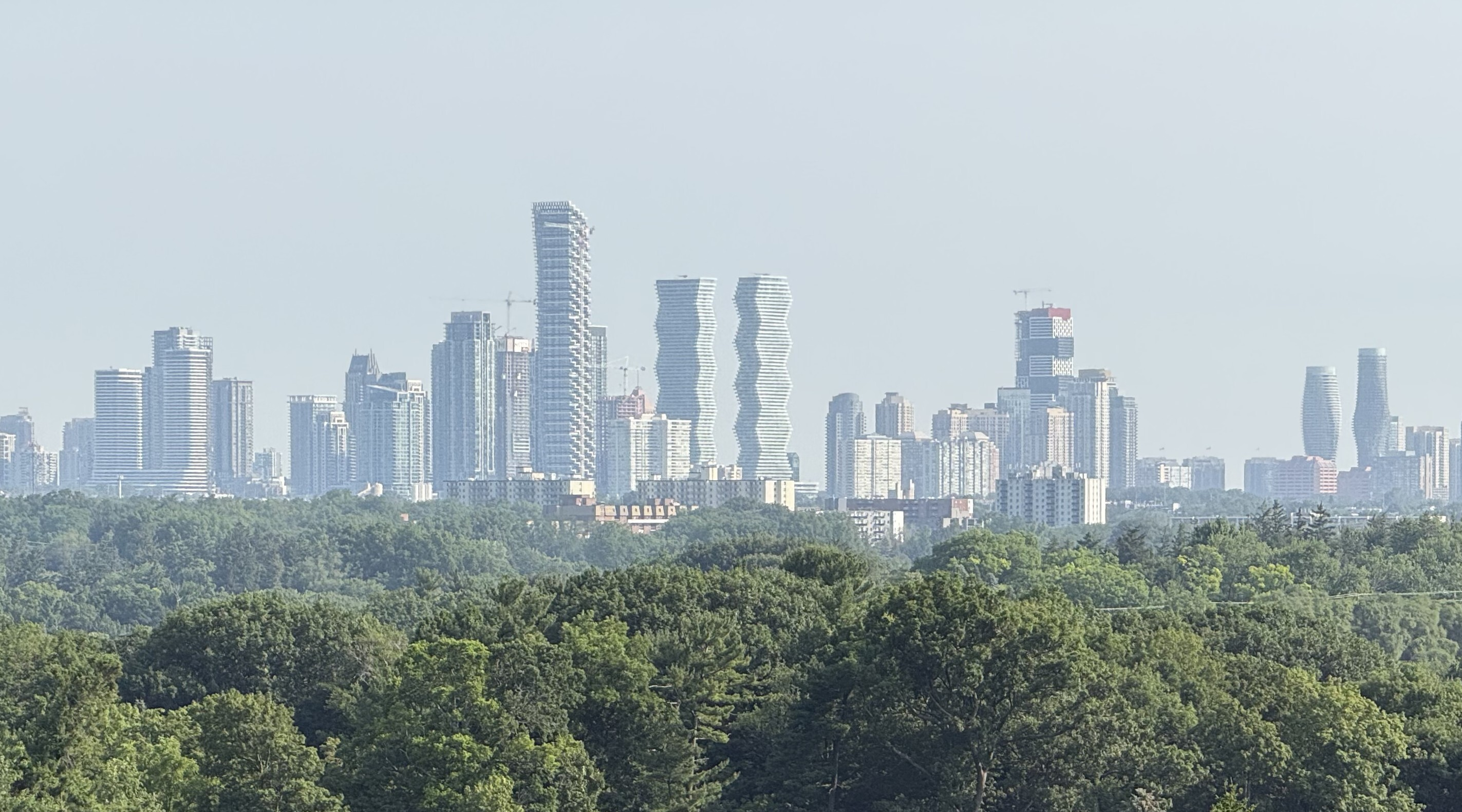
- Mississauga skyline
- Interactive map of Mississauga City Centre
- Coordinates: 43°35′28″N 79°38′40″W
- Country: Canada
- Province: Ontario
- Region: Peel
- City: Mississauga

Mississauga City Centre is the downtown of Mississauga, Ontario. A planned community undergoing significant development, it is centred around Square One Shopping Centre, the second largest shopping mall in Canada. The core is bounded by Confederation Parkway to the west, Hurontario Street to the east, Webb Drive to the south and Centre View Drive to the north.

The newer urban corridor developing along Confederation Parkway between Rathburn Road and Burnhamthorpe Road consists of residential highrise buildings. The city's financial district, centred along Hurontario Street and Robert Speck Parkway, is home to the Mississauga Executive Centre and One City Centre Drive, and well as other smaller office complexes.

== Design and layout ==
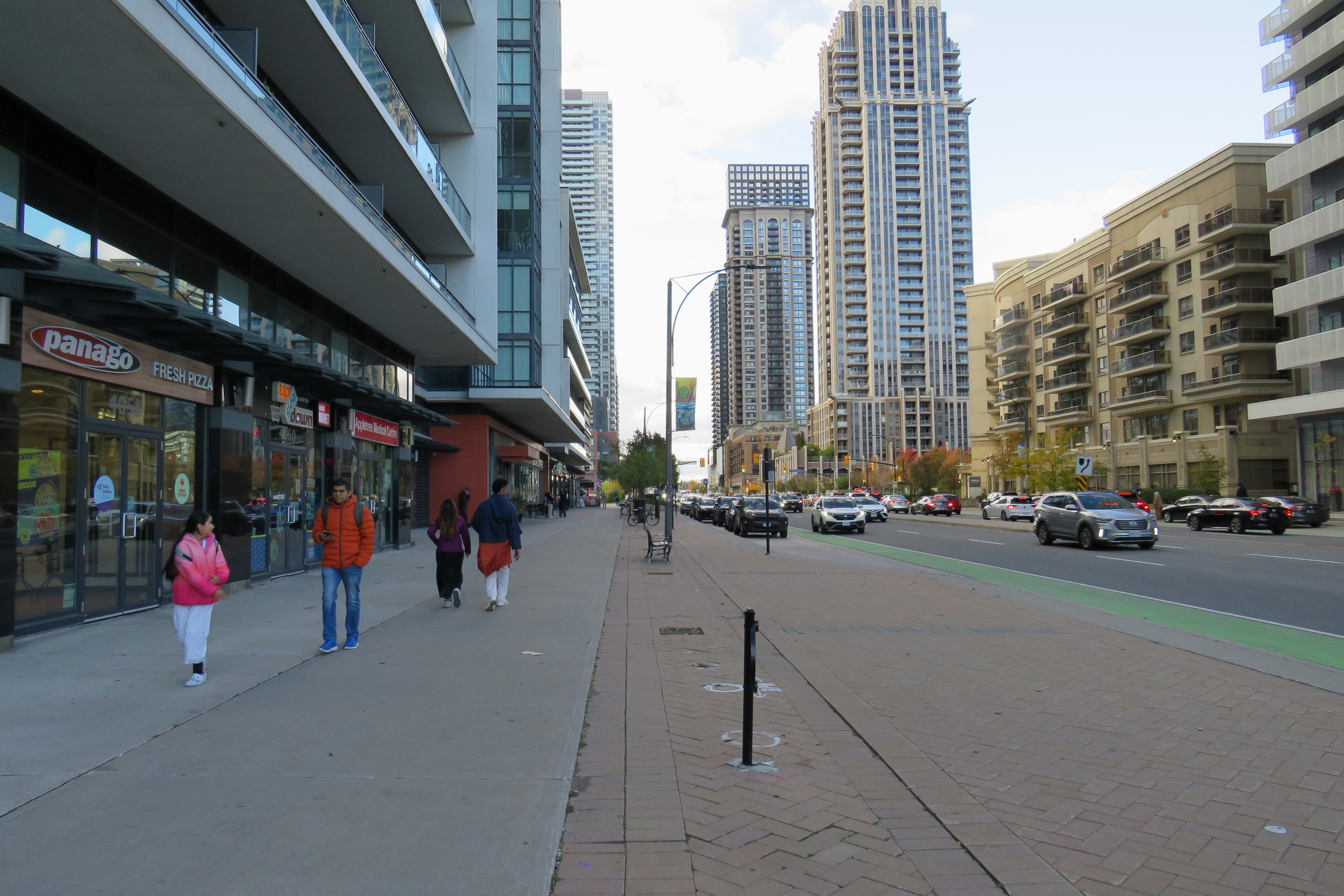
Streetscape along Confederation Parkway

Mississauga is a primarily suburban municipality created from the predominantly-rural Toronto Township, which was restructured into the Town of Mississauga in 1968. The present city was established by amalgamating the new town with the historic independent towns, Port Credit and Streetsville in 1974. As the city grew, several mid-rise condominium buildings were constructed at the corner of Hurontario Street and Burnhamthorpe Road, overlooking the then-new Square One Shopping Centre. The city centre spread northwest from the intersection over the next several decades, until the mid 2010s when the new urban centre was catalyzed by the Chicago tower and One Park Tower. As a result being a suburban downtown, the core is a modern and fully planned greenfield development, rather than a traditional city downtown which grew over a long period of time. As such, its boundaries are sharp and there is no transitional inner city between it and the surrounding suburban areas. In addition, despite Mississauga being located on Lake Ontario, the city centre is not located on or near the waterfront (as is typically the case for cities situated by water), but is located well inland. Instead, the city's urban waterfront is located in Port Credit, one of Mississauga's original historic townsites, roughly 6 km (3.7 mi) south along Hurontario.

Originally, there was an octagonal ring road encircling Square One Shopping Centre, but later changes to the street pattern as development progressed resulted in parts of it being incorporated into the present City Centre Drive and Duke of York Boulevard or being replaced by Square One Drive.

The early developments in the city centre were mostly office buildings set in the middle of parking lots or condominiums constructed in tower in the park settings, as was the typical before the new urbanism principle was applied in the city centre planning area. Two of these office developments (including Mississauga's second Civic Centre) have since been demolished and have been or are being replaced with new projects.

== History ==
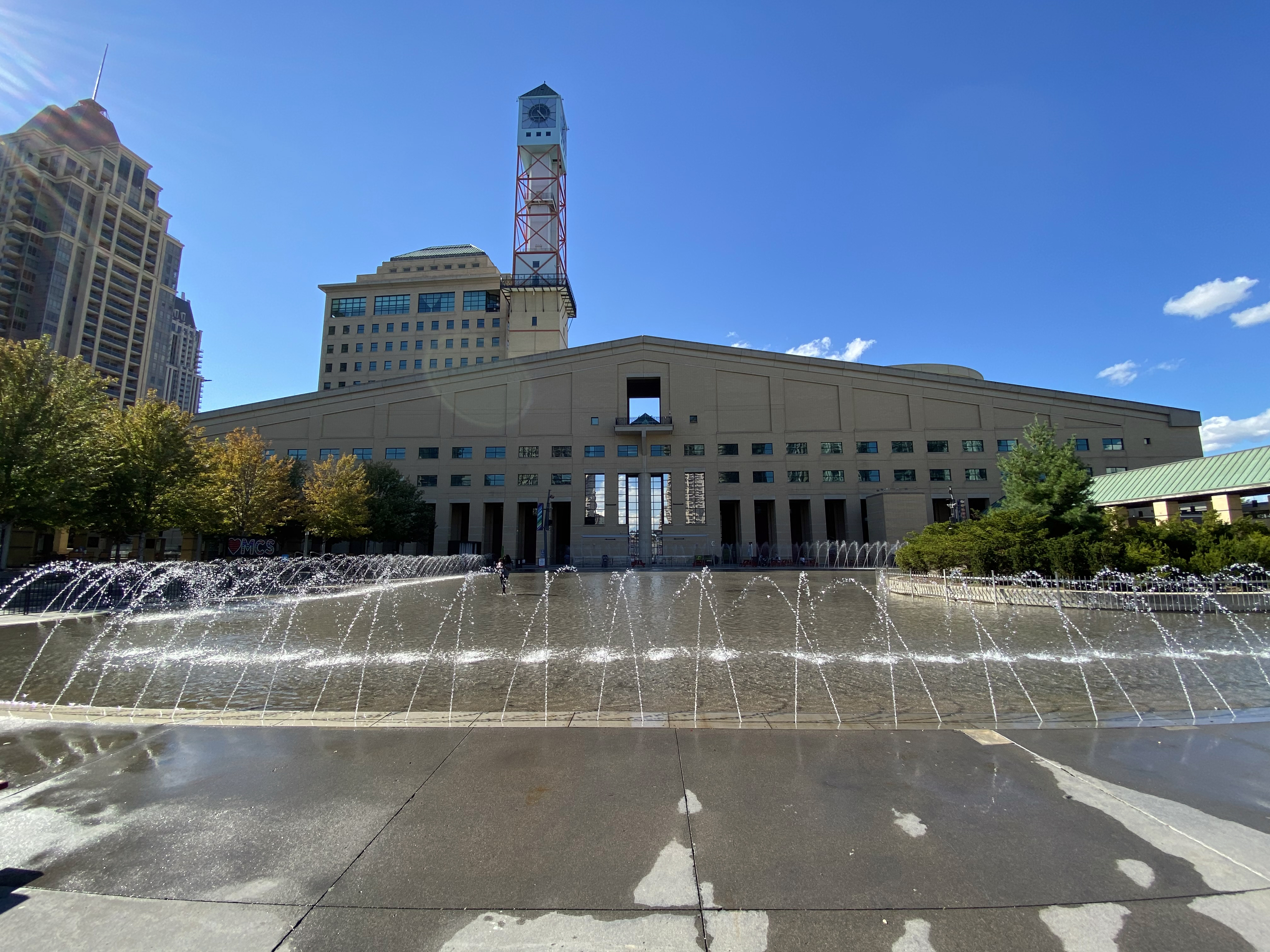
Mississauga Civic Centre, completed in 1987

The intersection of Hurontario Street and Burnhamthorpe Road was once the site of a rural hamlet named Payne's Corners. Prior to 1973, the area was predominantly agricultural. In the 1950s, developer Bruce McLaughlin began buying up farms in the area as he envisioned the-then mostly rural Toronto Township, as Mississauga was then known, becoming a future major city (at the time, suburban growth was already spilling over from Metropolitan Toronto) with a new urban core. To get his envisioned core started, he proposed building Square One in 1969. The new core was given an additional boost that year after a fire badly damaged the newly incorporated Town of Mississauga's municipal offices in the nearby community of Cooksville, prompting the municipality to move its offices (a move that was already being contemplated) to a new building constructed on a plot of land in the area exchanged with McLaughlin for the old Cooksville property.

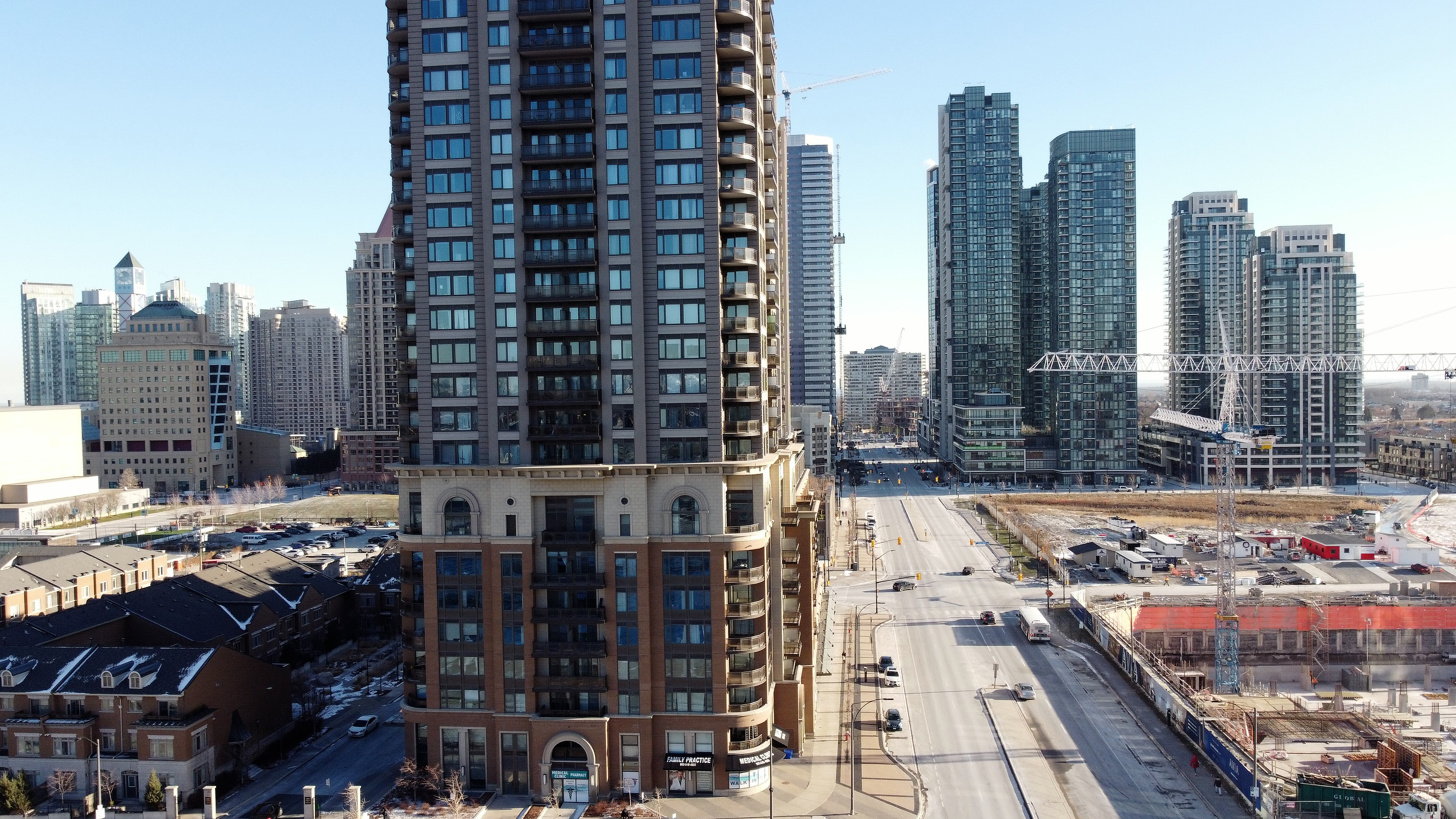
Confederation Parkway's high rise corridor under development in 2020

In 1973, Square One opened, and it provided the catalyst for the development of the new city centre. Mississauga's first mayor, Martin Dobkin, as well as then-future mayor Hazel McCallion, wanted the city centre developed in Cooksville, the municipality's most central historic community, by intensification, but the popularity of the mall (as well as the location of the civic centre), enticed developers, such as Ignat Kaneff and Harold Shipp, to construct condominium and office projects around it, such as the Mississauga Executive Centre in 1976. In 1986, Shipp worked with the Mathews Corporation to open a Novotel hotel, which is today still the only hotel in the city centre.

When McLaughlin's corporation ran into financial difficulties in the late 1970s, Mayor Hazel McCallion proposed that an iconic new city hall with a large civic square be built. Groundbreaking took place in 1984 for the new facility, and it was opened in July 1987, with the Duke and Duchess of York being present at the opening ceremonies.

== Buildings ==
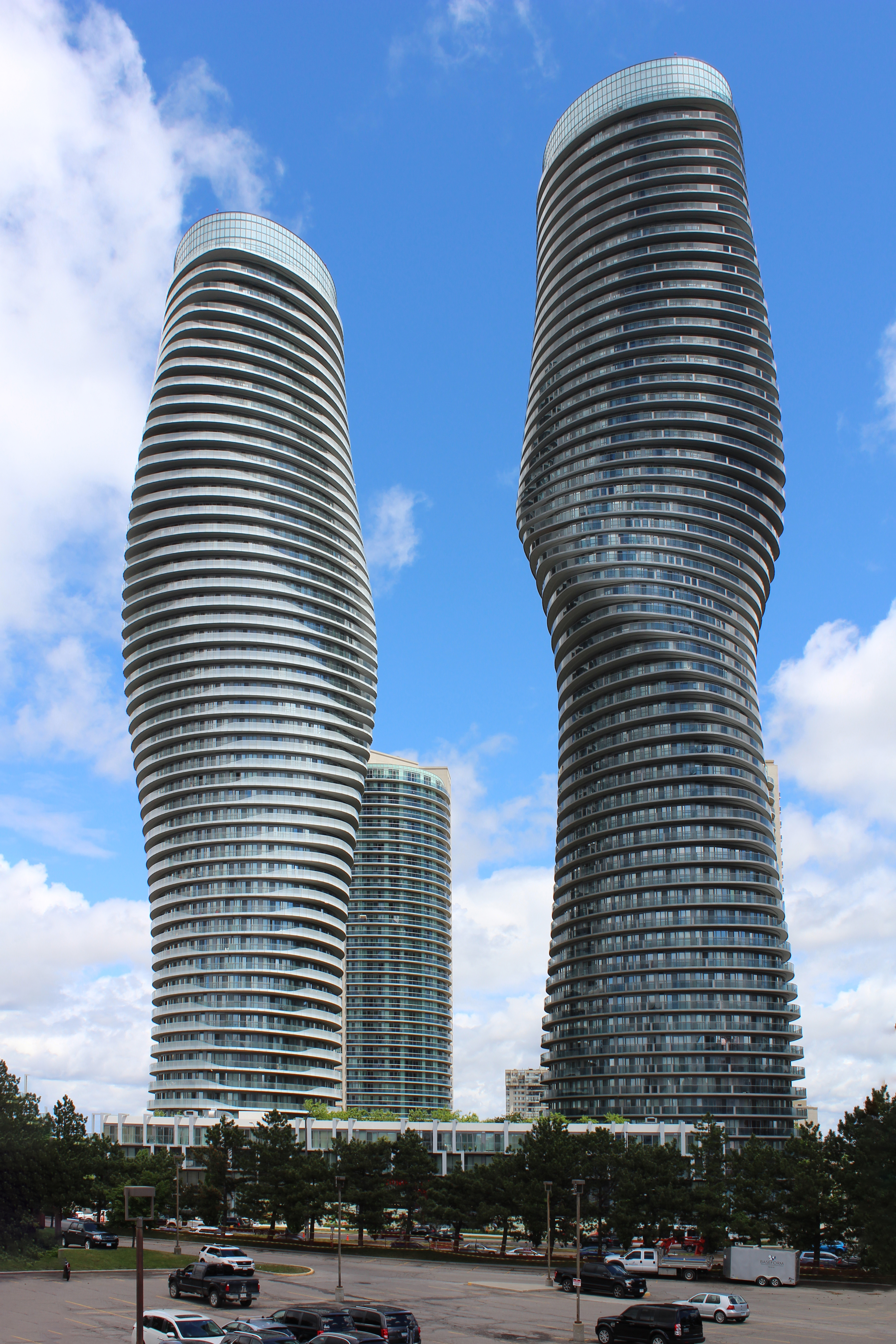
Absolute World

Mississauga City Centre today has a large number of high-rise buildings; the most of any city core in Ontario aside from downtown Toronto itself. Additionally, it has several more under construction and planned. Most of this newer growth has occurred west of City Hall in the new urban centre, located along Confederation Parkway, in an area that was the last sector to develop but which has now become the most densely populated area in the core, and that most resembles a stereotypical downtown streetscape, with cafés, restaurants, and services lining the street.

One of the earliest built and most prominent buildings in the city centre include the aforementioned City Hall. As of 2023, the tallest are the twin M1 and M2 towers. These towers are part of the larger M City development (see below). Further east stands the residential Absolute World complex, located at the northeast corner of Burnhamthorpe and Hurontario. It consists of six towers, with its iconic main twin towers, nicknamed "the Marilyn Monroe" because of their curvy shape, standing 50 and 56 storeys. Other residential towers include Avia at Parkside Village, Square One District, The Exchange District, One Park Tower, and Chicago.

=== Projects under construction ===
Projects currently under construction include the multi-tower M City Condominiums, Avia, and Exchange District Condos.

==== M City ====
M City is a landmark 8 tower mega-project located on the southwest quadrant of Confederation and Burnhamthorpe. The first two towers are complete as of 2024 and stand at a height of just under 200m (656ft) each, with the third tower, M3, under construction. Upon completion, M3 will be the tallest building in Mississauga at nearly 260m (853ft) or 81 stories. Additionally, it will be the tallest building in Canada outside Toronto. M4, standing at 216m (708ft) will be the city's most technologically advanced residential building, having won several awards for excellence in design and technology. M5 is the development's shortest building, standing only at 123m (403.5ft) or 36 stories. The remaining three towers form "The Three Sisters", a trio of matching towers, standing at 194, 175, and 159 m (439.5, 574, and 126 ft) respectively. This development aims to redefine the city's skyline, and define Mississauga's downtown core as the gold standard in modern urban development.

==== The Exchange District ====
The exchange district is a large 4-tower development located centrally on Burnhamthorpe road between Confederation Parkway and Hurontario Street. It will consist of four residential buildings, with heights of 72, 60, 42, and 30 stories respectively, and will include over 2 million square feet of space, including commercial, retail, dining, offices and a boutique hotel.

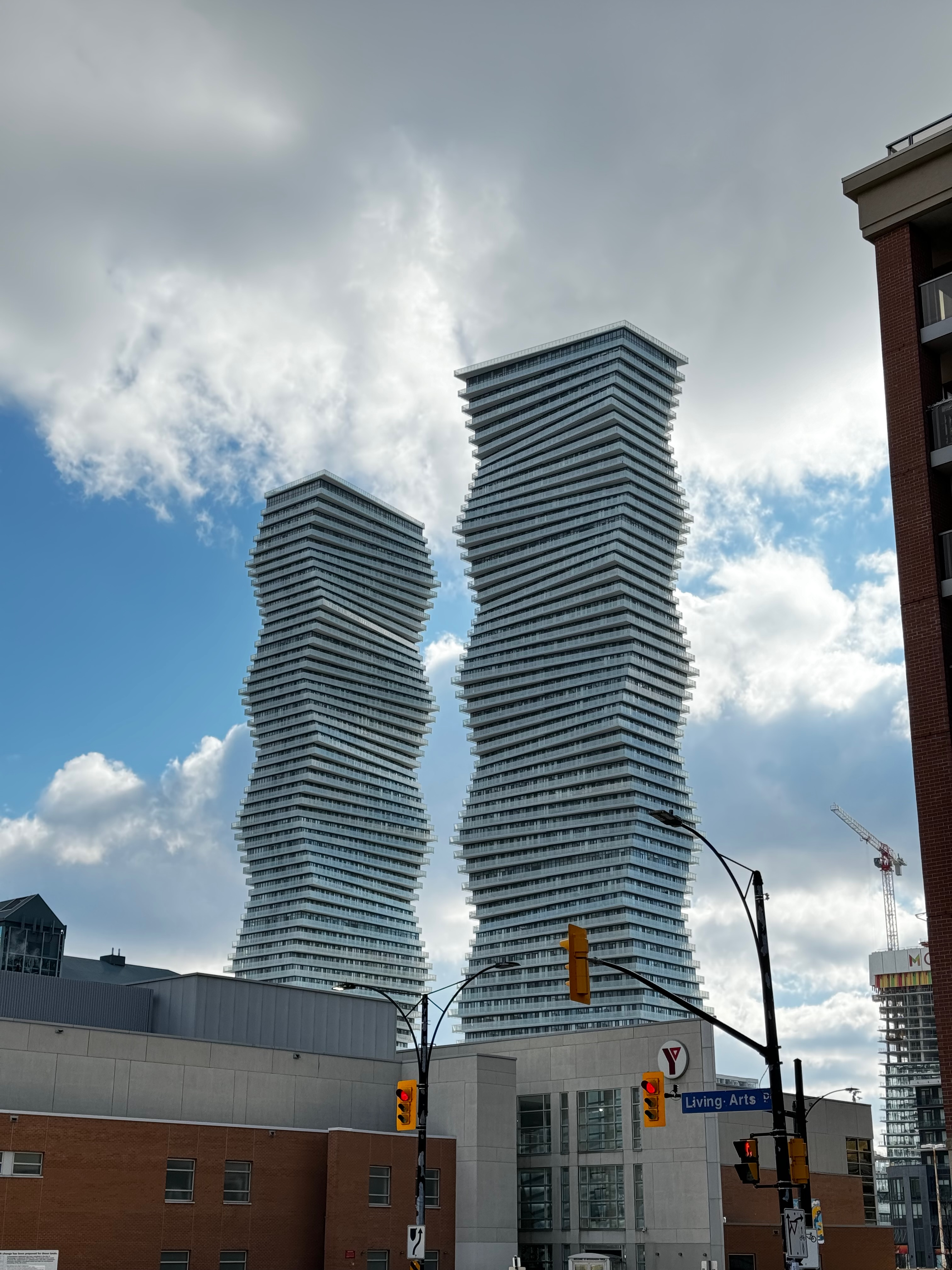
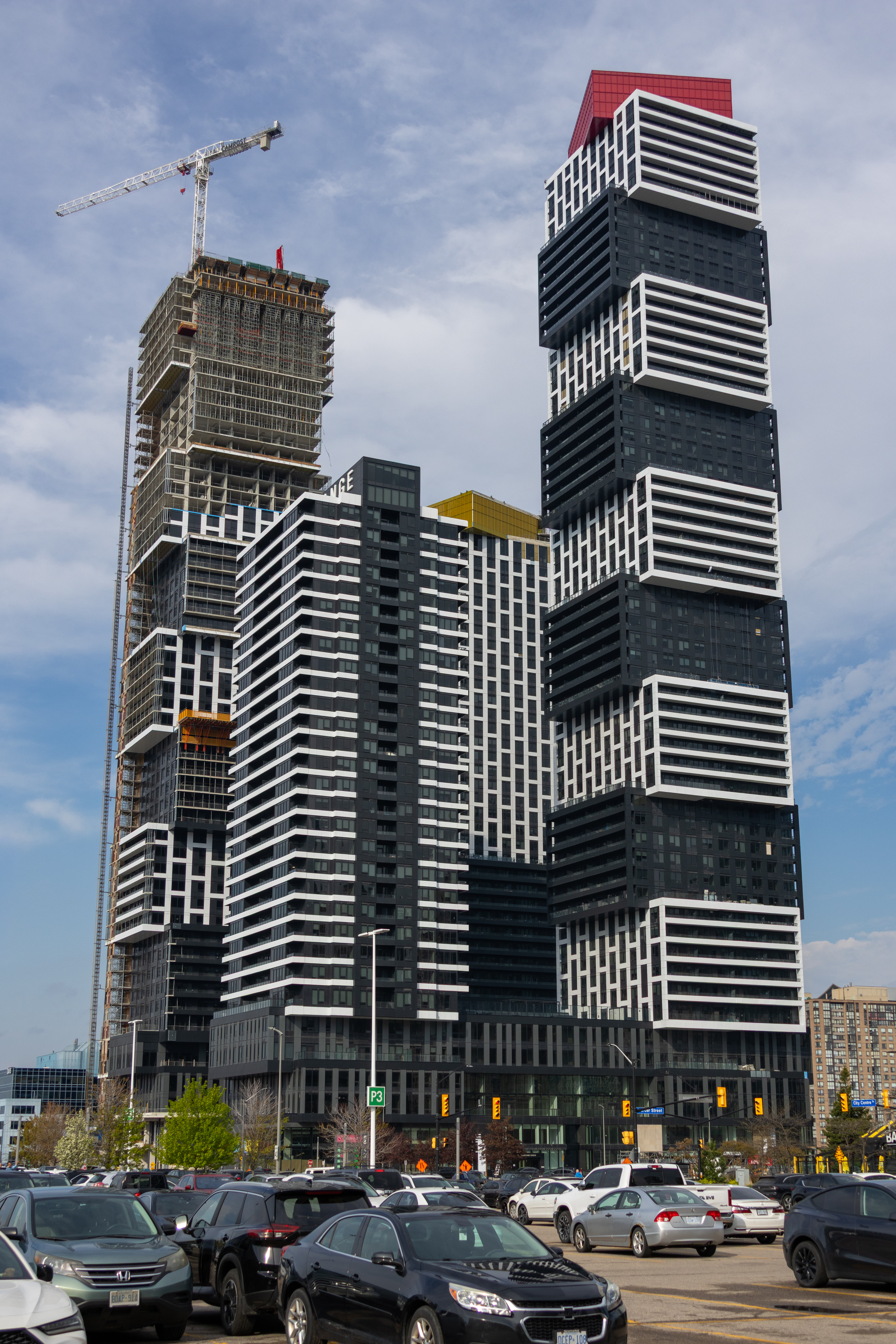
The completed first two towers of M City in February 2024; M1 and M2 (left), and the under-construction Exchange District in May 2026 (right)

== Institutions ==
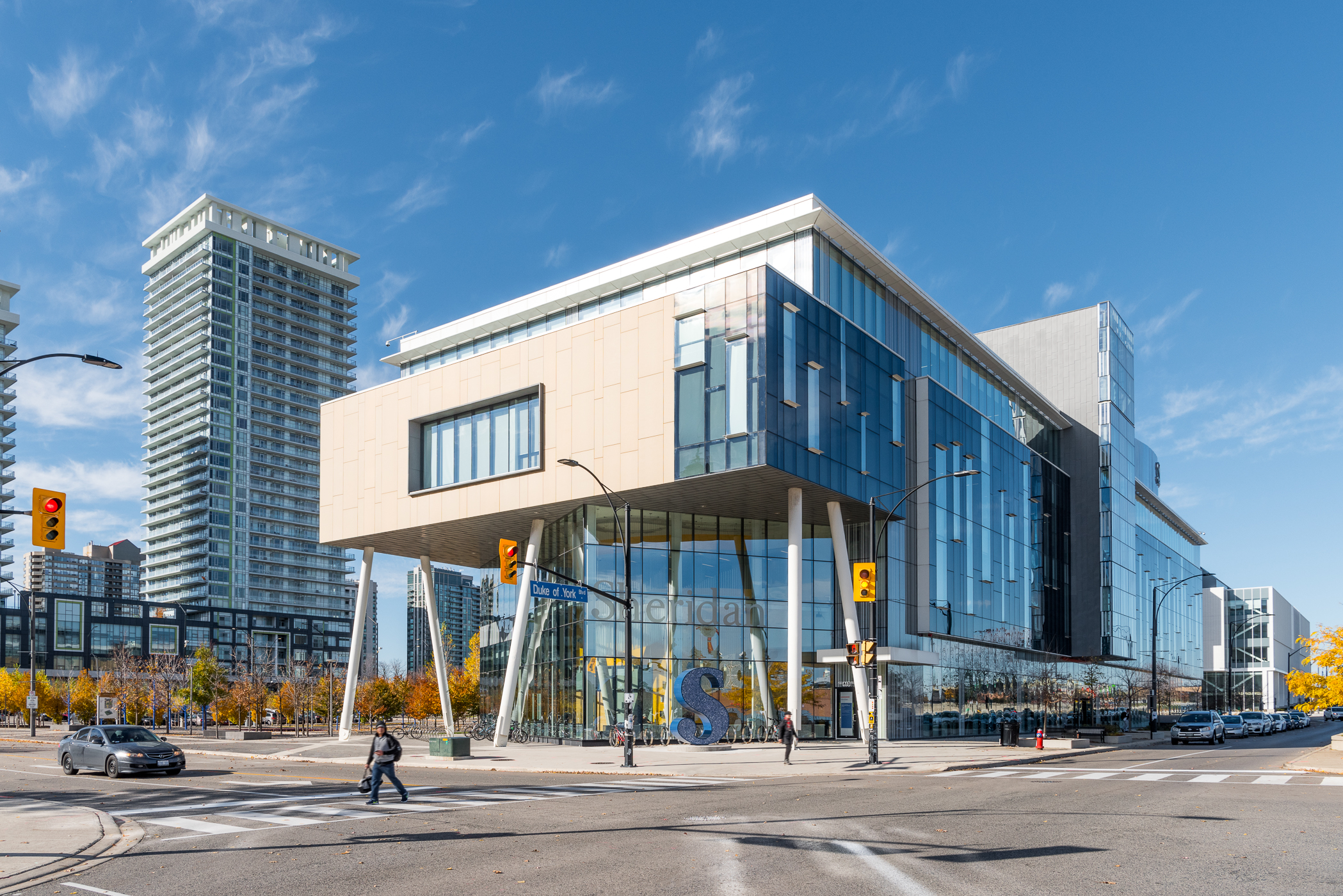
Sheridan College Hazel McCallion Campus

Mississauga's largest public library, the Hazel McCallion Central Library, is located at 301 Burnhamthorpe Road West at the corner of Living Arts Drive. The city's YMCA is located at 325 Burnhamthorpe West, across the street from the Central Library. Living Arts Centre, a performing arts venue, opened in 1997. A satellite campus of Sheridan College, the Hazel McCallion Campus, is also located in the city centre at 4180 Duke of York Boulevard at Rathburn Road. Its first phase opened in 2011. TriOS College also has a small campus at 55 City Centre Drive. Celebration Square is home to festivals and concerts, as well as frequent movie screenings for the downtown core's residents to enjoy. During the spring and summer, farmer's markets are held. Additionally, food trucks, a sports field, an amphitheatre, a splash pad (which doubles as a skating rink in the winter) and a garden.

== Transportation ==
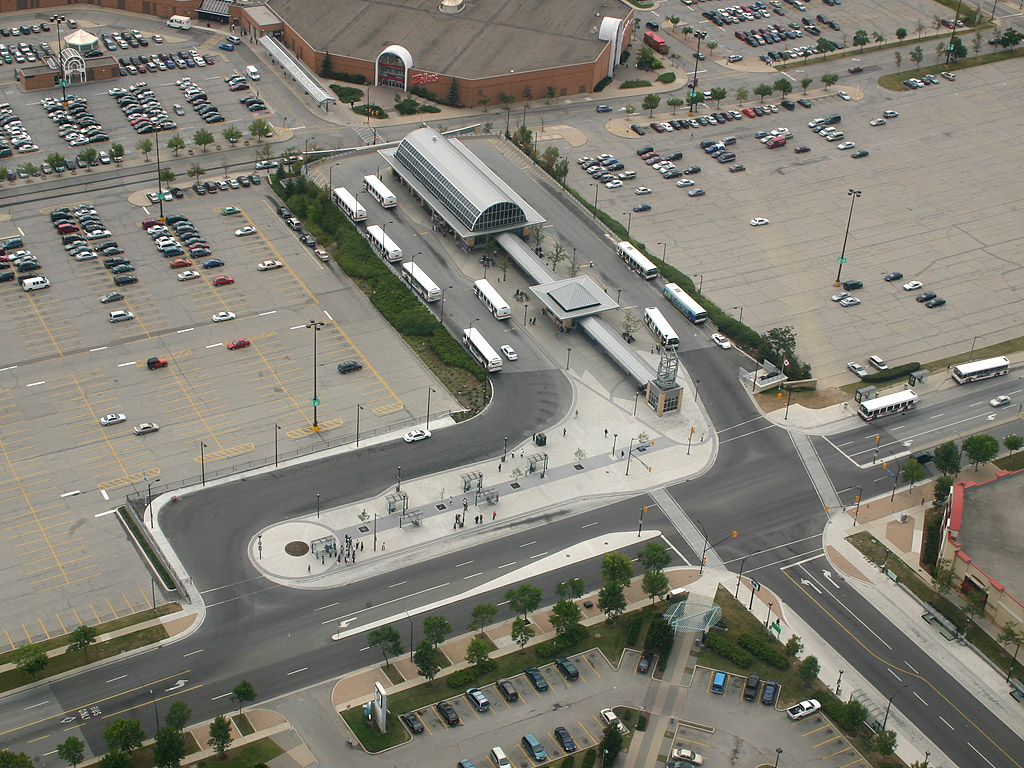
Aerial view of City Centre Transit Terminal

=== Public transit ===
Mississauga City Centre is well-served by MiWay and GO Transit. The City Centre Transit Terminal is the city's main transit terminal and hosts 21 MiWay bus routes and one Brampton Transit–operated bus rapid transit (named Züm) route. GO Transit buses serve the nearby Square One Bus Terminal. The under-construction Hurontario LRT (officially called the Hazel McCallion Line) will serve the terminal via a spur along Rathburn Road.

=== Roads ===
The four key arteries in the city centre are Hurontario Street, Confederation Parkway, Burnhamthorpe Road, Rathburn Road. The former two run north-south and the latter east-west. Secondary streets such as City Centre drive, Centre View drive and Duke of York boulevard are smaller roads in the core. Duke of York Boulevard and Square One Drive intersect south of Rathburn road, at which location exists the city's only roundabout. Highway 403 forms the northern boundary of the city centre and provides access to it from interchanges at Hurontario Street and Mavis Road, with the latter accessed via Centre View Drive, which runs alongside the freeway and branches off eastbound from the interchange.
