= City centre =

Commercial and cultural heartland of a city

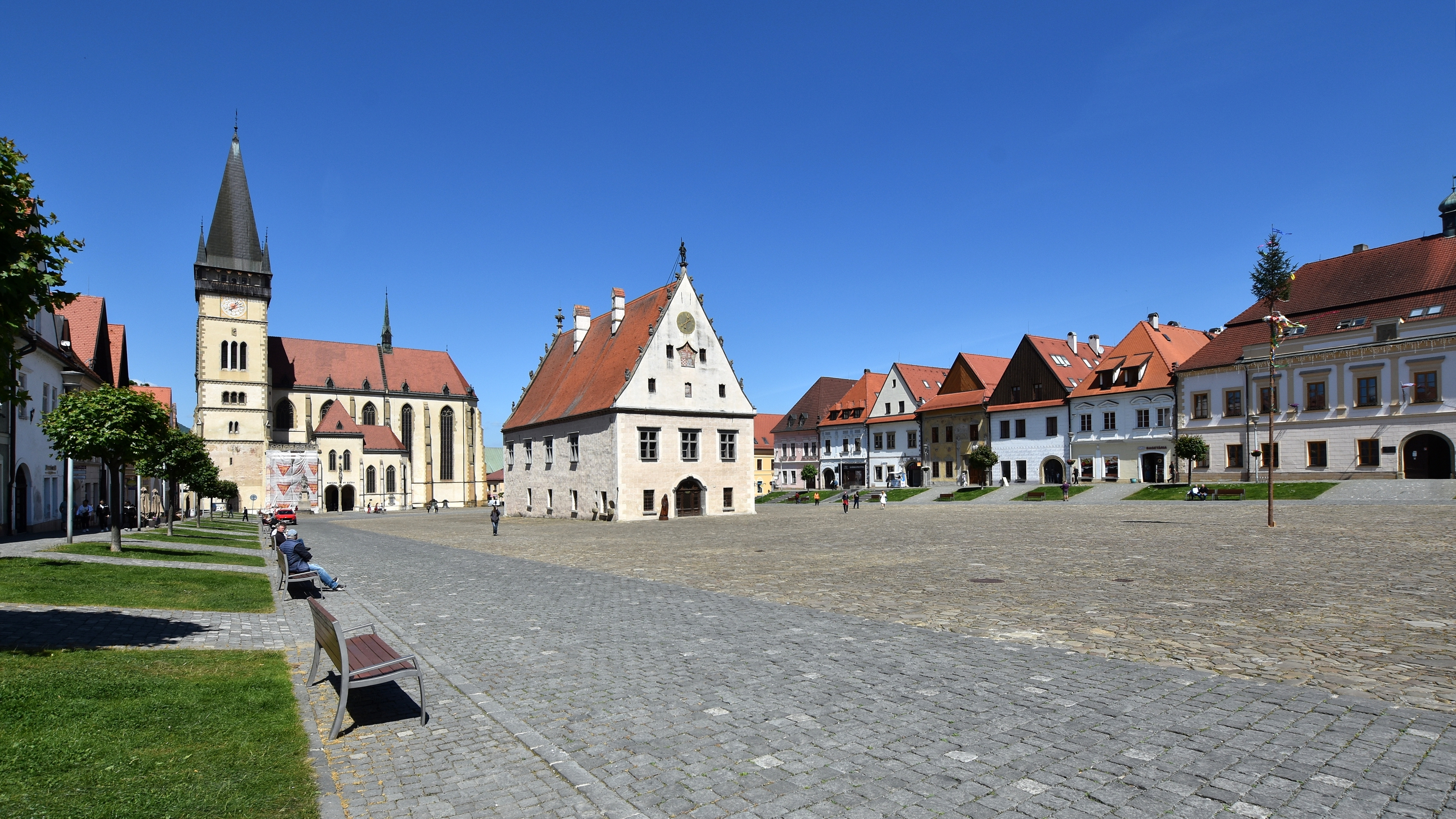
The historic centre of Bardejov, Slovakia–a UNESCO World Heritage Site.

A city centre, also known as an urban core, is the commercial, cultural and often the historical, political, and geographic heart of a city. The term city centre is used mainly in British English, and closely equivalent terms that exist in other languages, such as centre-ville in French, Stadtzentrum in German, or shìzhōngxīn (市中心) in Chinese. The term downtown is generally used in North America, though a few cities, like Philadelphia, use the term Center City or City Center.

== Overview and related concepts ==
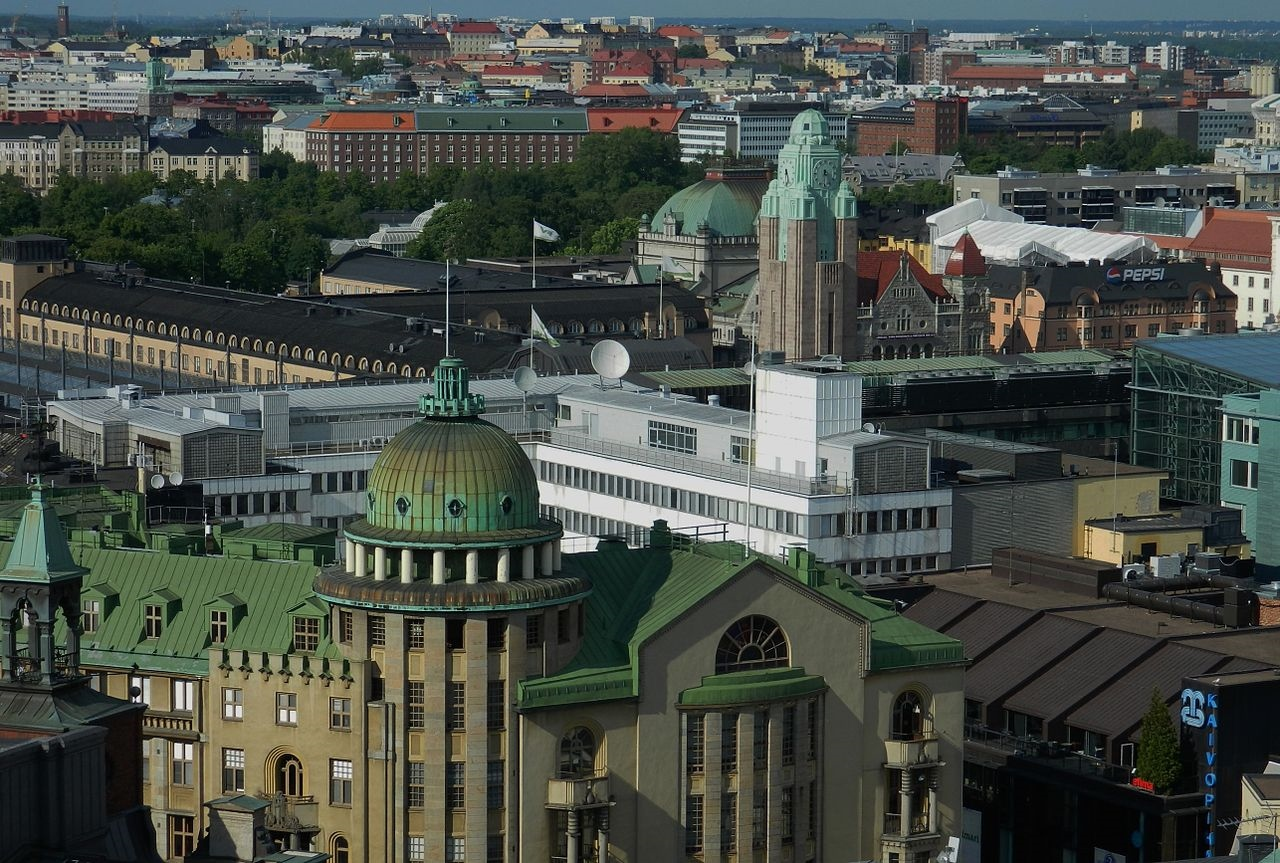
Kluuvi, a city centre of Helsinki, Finland

The city centre is the (often historical) area of a city where commerce, entertainment, shopping, and political power are concentrated. The term is commonly used in many English-speaking countries and has direct equivalents in many other languages. However, noticeably, in the United States, the term "downtown" is commonly used to denote a city centre, and in Canada the terms "city centre" and "downtown" are used interchangeably, most notable in the modern, purpose-built cores of former boroughs or newer suburban cities that had no traditional urban core (i.e. North York City Centre and Mississauga City Centre). In Australia, the term "Central Business District" is widely used to refer to the city centre, but usage of the term "City Centre" is increasing, especially in Melbourne. In South Africa, "CBD" is used in formal contexts, but in informal contexts, the city centre is referred to as "town", and despite the growth of decentralised CBDs such as Sandton and uMhlanga "town" continues to refer to the original CBDs of cities.

In many cities, the Central Business District (CBD) is within the city centre, but the concept "city centre" differs from the CBD. The concept of the "CBD" revolves solely around economic and financial power, but the "city centre" also includes historical, political, and cultural factors. A clear example is Paris: La Défense is the central business district of Paris, but it is not the city centre. In most larger and/or older cities, the CBD and the city centre may overlap only partially, if at all.

A city centre is often the first settled part of a city, which can make it the most historical part of a city: in such cases, it may be known as the "old town" (sometimes capitalized as a proper name).

== Usage ==
A typical European road sign, used to indicate direction to the city centre

=== Australia ===
In most Australian cities, the city centre to some extent coincides with the central business district, with the result that "the City", "city centre", and "central business district" or "CBD" are regarded as near-synonyms. However, in some Australian cities, the city centre and the CBD are geographically separately identified. The term "CBD" is not often used in the capital Canberra, where the primary activity is government; its "city centre" is usually identified as the district called "City" or "Civic".

=== China ===
In Chinese, the urban centre of a city is called the "city centre" or "urban core" (Chinese: 市中心; pinyin: shì zhōngxīn). In many cities, it is the historical city centre and the cultural and commercial centre. Historically, the CBD often occupied one portion of the city centre. In recent years, larger cities have often developed CBDs or financial districts that occupy a part of the city centre or are outside the historical city centre completely. For example, Beijing's historical city centre is defined by the former city walls and remains the political and cultural centre of the city, but Beijing's CBD sits in Chaoyang District, to the east of the historical city; Shanghai's city centre was defined by the Old Chinese City, the International Settlement and the French Concession and sat on the west bank of the Huangpu River, whereas the modern financial district is concentrated on Lujiazui, a newly developed area across the river from the traditional city centre (although parts of the traditional city centre remain key financial and business centres).

=== Israel ===
The Hebrew term for "city centre" is a direct translation: "מרכז העיר" (merkaz ha'ir); however it is used inconsistently in different cities throughout Israel due to their extremely varied topographies and urban designs.

- In Jerusalem the term is used both colloquially and officially as the name of the commercial district that lies at the geographical center of the Western city. This area is many times larger, denser and more active than any of the city's other commercial centres. The formation of a dedicated city centre resulted partially from geographical necessity; pedestrian travel between different neighborhoods is difficult due to the hilly terrain, so public transportation and wider roadways instead pull residents to one centralized location - atop the city's central ridge-line - where they can congregate effectively. At the edges of the district the urban make-up shifts almost abruptly into residential neighborhoods, creating palpable boundaries. Much-smaller commercial centres within each residential neighborhood may meet day-to-day shopping needs, but mostly attract only local residents. In this way, Jerusalem's residential neighborhoods function more like suburbs to the Jerusalem City Centre.
- By contrast, Tel Aviv follows a much more decentralized urban design scheme, with services, shopping, entertainment and cultural institutions spread out more evenly throughout the entire city. This design philosophy applies also to Tel Aviv's many satellite cities (the "Gush Dan" metropolitan area), creating a much more uniform sprawl of commercial activity that only gradually decreases towards the suburbs. Decentralization provides a vast proportion of Tel Aviv's residents with access to a large variety of services, shopping, and leisure activities very close to home, typically within walking or biking distance. As a result, the term "Tel Aviv centre" is often more of a geographical reference to the city's central region, in contrast with "north Tel Aviv" and "south Tel Aviv" which have their own unique social atmospheres. This central region, encompassing roughly one third of the city's total municipal area, does feature a higher concentration of leisure and shopping businesses, but is simultaneously also strongly residential - housing one third of the city's residents. Nevertheless, most skyscrapers and non-service businesses in Gush Dan are situated at the edges of Tel Aviv centre or completely outside it - as result of a conscious decision of the municipal government to keep them out. This gives central Tel Aviv a very laid-back atmosphere relative to its central location within the heavily populated metropolis.
- Haifa, Israel's third largest city, has its Central Business District situated at its geographical north along the shoreline of Haifa Bay. This flat, seaside area is called the "Lower City" of Haifa, in contrast to the neighborhoods on the slopes and peak of Mount Carmel to its southeast. Though it contains a few residential neighborhoods, the Lower City houses only 5% of the city's entire population, and features almost all of its tallest structures, most of which are office spaces. Commercial and leisure centers in Haifa are mostly found outside the Lower City, and have attracted much more activity than the Lower City since the 1980s, leaving the Lower City partially dilapidated. New developments in the Lower City since the start of the 21st century aim to reverse this trend.

=== Netherlands ===
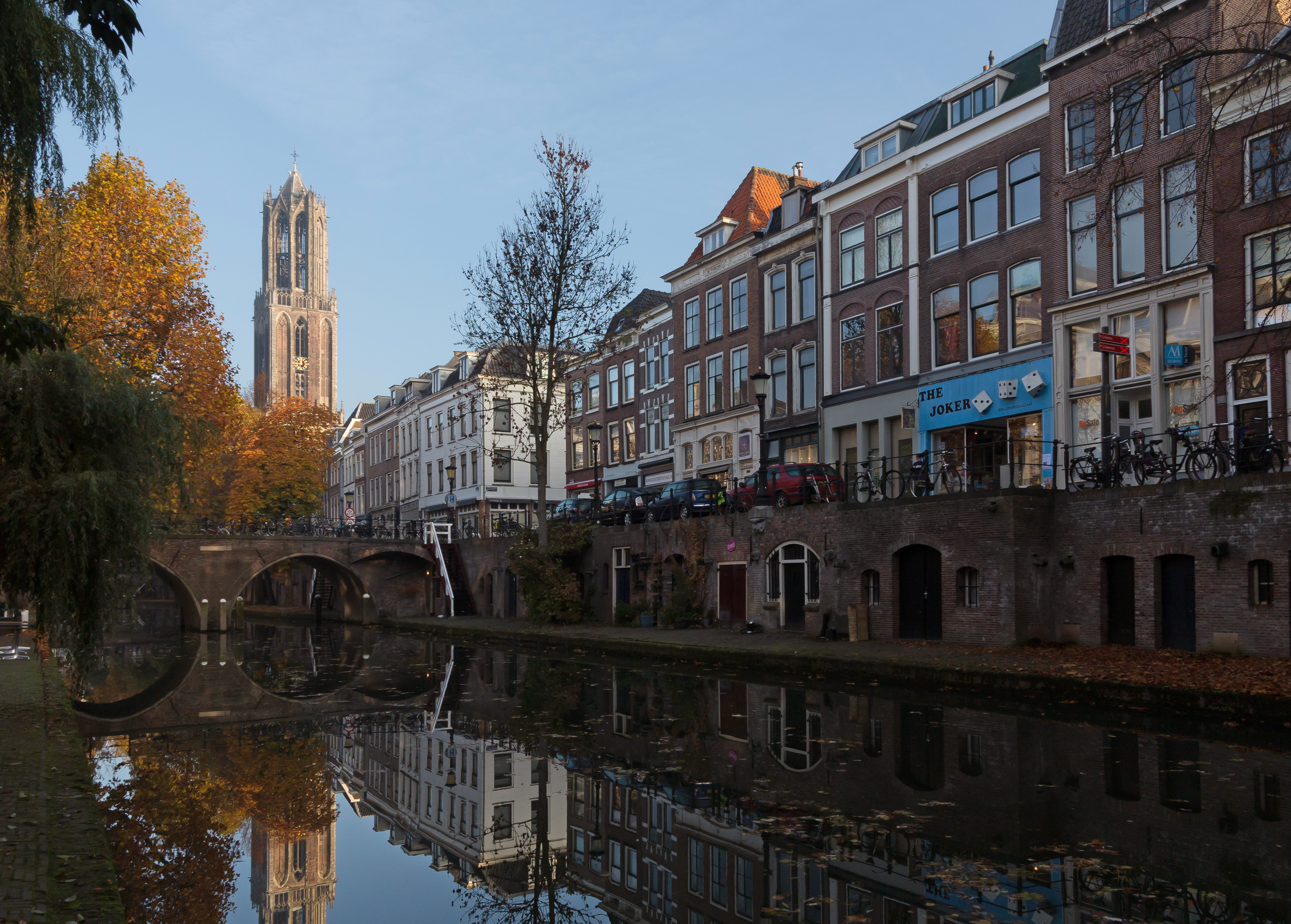
The historic centre of Utrecht, Netherlands

In Dutch, the terms binnenstad, centrum, stadscentrum, or stadskern are used to describe the city centre. Amsterdam is a clear example of the city centre and the central business district not being the same area. The city centre of Amsterdam is Centrum, the historical heart of the city, but the CBD areas of Amsterdam are all in different districts. Additionally, Westpoort serves as the city's industrial park.

Because of the bombardment of Rotterdam during World War II, with the loss of its historical core, the city centre and the CBD are the same area in Rotterdam.

=== New Zealand ===
City centre and central business district are used interchangeably in New Zealand for any urban area that had city status prior to the 1989 local government reorganisation which saw many city councils amalgamate with surrounding boroughs, counties and towns to form larger districts. Prior to 1989, city status was granted to a town or borough with a population greater than 20,000. In everyday language, New Zealanders often refer to city centres as going to "town".

Wellington metropolitan area has 4 respective city centres in Wellington, Lower Hutt, Porirua and Upper Hutt whereas Auckland metropolitan area has 2 city centres in Auckland and Manukau. Timaru has a "city centre" whereas towns larger than it such as Blenheim or Pukekohe have "town centres" as they did not achieve city status prior to the 1989 local government reform which changed the population threshold for city status to 50,000.

=== Philippines ===
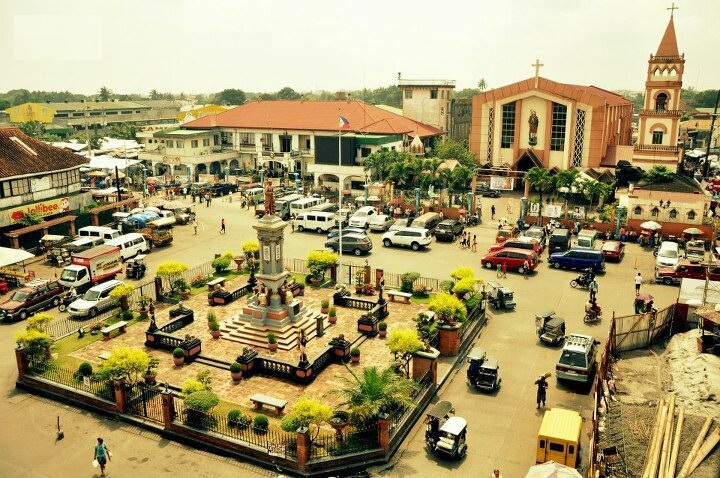
Plaza Rizal in Biñan's poblacion

Poblacion (from Spanish población, meaning "population"), sometimes abbreviated as Pob., is a term used in the Philippines to refer to the administrative center, downtown, old town, or commercial area of a city or municipality. It may consist of a single barangay or multiple barangays. Colloquially, the población area is also called bayan (see also other definitions of bayan), plaza, or centro.

== See also ==
- 100 percent corner
- Administrative centre
- Central business district
- Inner city
- Town centre
