= One Park Tower (Mississauga) =

Skyscraper in Mississauga, Ontario, Canada

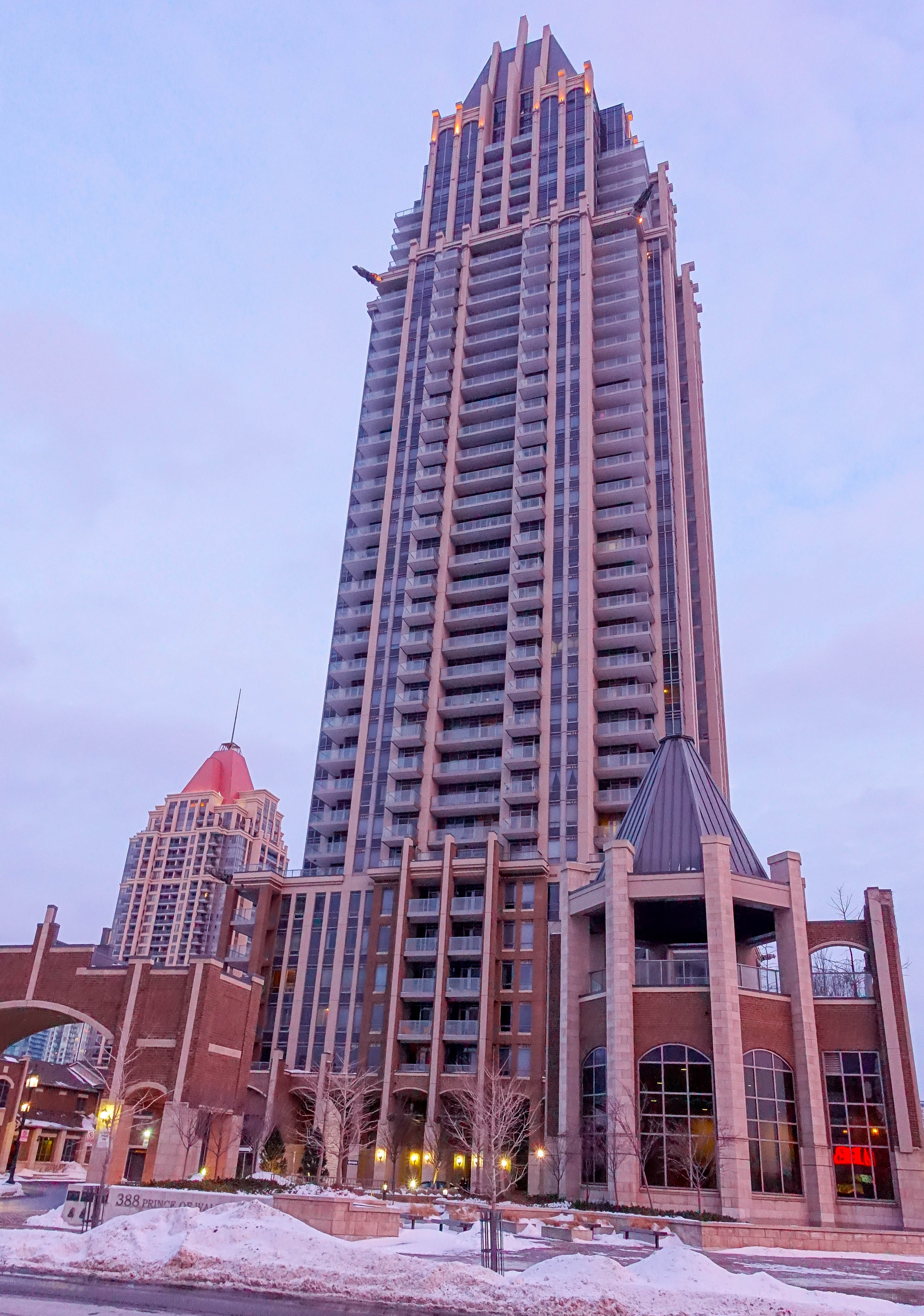
- Interactive map of the One Park Tower area

General information
- Type: Residential
- Architectural style: Postmodern
- Location: 388 Prince of Wales Drive; Mississauga, Ontario, Canada
- Coordinates: 43.5880964°N 79.6483114°W
- Construction started: 2006
- Completed: 2009

Height
- Height: 142 m (466 ft)

Technical details
- Floor count: 38 floors
- Lifts/elevators: 4

Design and construction
- Architects: Kirkor Architects & Planners
- Developer: The Daniels Corporation

Other information
- Number of units: 405

One Park Tower is a skyscraper located in Mississauga, Ontario, Canada. It was completed in 2008, stands at 142 meters, and has 38 floors, making it the third tallest building in Mississauga as of 2011. One Park Tower was the city's tallest building at its completion, but was soon surpassed by the Absolute World towers, standing at 168 and 151 meters. The building is used as a residential condominium.

== Amenities ==
The 142 m tall building in Mississauga does have a few amenities, such as:

- Concierge
- Rooftop Lounge
- Party Room
- Garden Terraces
- Indoor Swimming Pool
- Fitness Centre
- Media Room
- Dry Cleaner
- Billiards Room

== See also ==
- List of tallest buildings in Mississauga
