= M-City J.r. =

American rapper

- Also known as: City
- Born: D'Andre Jamal Mason; 1991 or 1992 (age 33–34); Detroit, Michigan
- Genres: Hip hop; Trap
- Occupations: Rapper; singer; songwriter
- Instrument: Vocals
- Years active: 2010–present
- Labels: Yola Gang; C.O.I.N. Handlers; Atlantic Records
- Website: Facebook profile

M-City J.r., or simply City, is an American rapper and songwriter. Having gained popularity on the Detroit underground hip hop and rap scene. He rose to prominence with his single Addicted to My Ex in 2016, when it reached No. 41 on the Hot R&B/Hip-Hop Songs chart. M-City J.r. is the creator and co-founder of the Yacht Club Social Network music collective and its brand YCSN Apparel.

== Life and career ==
M-City J.r. grew up in westside Detroit. After working on and off on various projects for a decade, City started performing on the Detroit underground hip hop and rap scene. He issued his first popular track, H1N1, in 2014. Grindin', released in August 2014, was a remix of Lil Wayne's song that City made with Geech and GodS way. It earned him a place among Control Detroit's "10 Detroit artists you should know in 2015."

On January 1, 2015, City released Salmonella, his second virus (as opposed to viral) single, featuring musical artists Sino and Adubb Da Gawd. The single was included in C.O.I.N. Handlers' Loose Change vol.2. He formed the Yacht Club Social Network music collective with MCs Geechi and CEOWaun, and released their single Sanctuary in 2015.

City performed at several festivals and shows in 2015, such as Hot 107.5 Summer Jamz 18 and Loose Change. He won the Imported From the D contest in May 2015 and Detroit's Local Love Tour contest for hip-hop, rap and R&B musicians in June. He had a motorcycle accident, which resulted in a recovery party and a docu-video, Road to Recovery.

On December 8, 2015, he released his single Cake (a metaphor for money), which depicts a young boy fleeing his home and heading into the chaos of the streets of Detroit. Michigan Chronicle said that "City masterfully tells a story of the desperation that comes along with trying to find opportunity in a desolate area."

His single Addicted to mMy Ex debuted at No. 15 on the Bubbling Under Hot 100 chart on April 19, 2016. On April 30, it hit No. 41 on the Hot R&B/Hip-Hop Songs chart, driven by surging sales (12,000 according to Nielsen Music) and streams (2.2 million U.S. clicks). The song was originally a reference for Young Thug. Its comical and "spectacularly strange" video follows the MC through Detroit on a quest to "flex his ex". It was described as "not so much an innovative record as a biggest possible maxed-out version of contemporary sounds and trends, a record which hits much heavier than it should."

== Musical style ==
The musical style of M-City J.r. has been associated with Kid Cudi, Trinidad James, King Hendrick$ and Young Thug, as well as Desiigner, Madeintyo and TY Dolla $ign.

== Singles ==
=== Solo ===
Title	Year	Peak chart positions	Album
Title	Year	US R&B /HH	Album
"H1N1"	2014	—	Non-album single
"22"	2014	—	Non-album single
"Grindin'"	2014	—	Non-album single
"Salmonella"	2015	—	Non-album single
"Pressure"	2015	—	Non-album single
"Cake"	2015	—	Non-album single
"Addicted to My Ex"	2016	41	Non-album single
"—" denotes a single that did not chart or was not released in that territory.

=== Yacht Club Social Network ===
Title	Year	Peak chart positions	Album
Mandatory	2015	-	Empire
Blue Strips	2015	-	Empire

== Mixtapes ==
Year	Title
2015	Empire

== Music videos ==
Year	Song	Album	Director
2014	22	Non-album single	Roe Dayzon
2014	#M.F.E.	Non-album single	Roe Dayzon
2014	Grindin'	Non-album single	Roe Dayzon
2015	Pressure	Non-album single	Roe Dayzon
2015	Cake	Non-album single	Roe Dayzon
2015	Blue Strips	Empire	Roe Dayzon
2015	Mandatory	Empire	Roe Dayzon
2016	Addicted to My Ex	Non-album single	Roe Dayzon
