= The Park Mansion =

Apartment building in Ontario

Coordinates: 43.604°N 79.6524°W

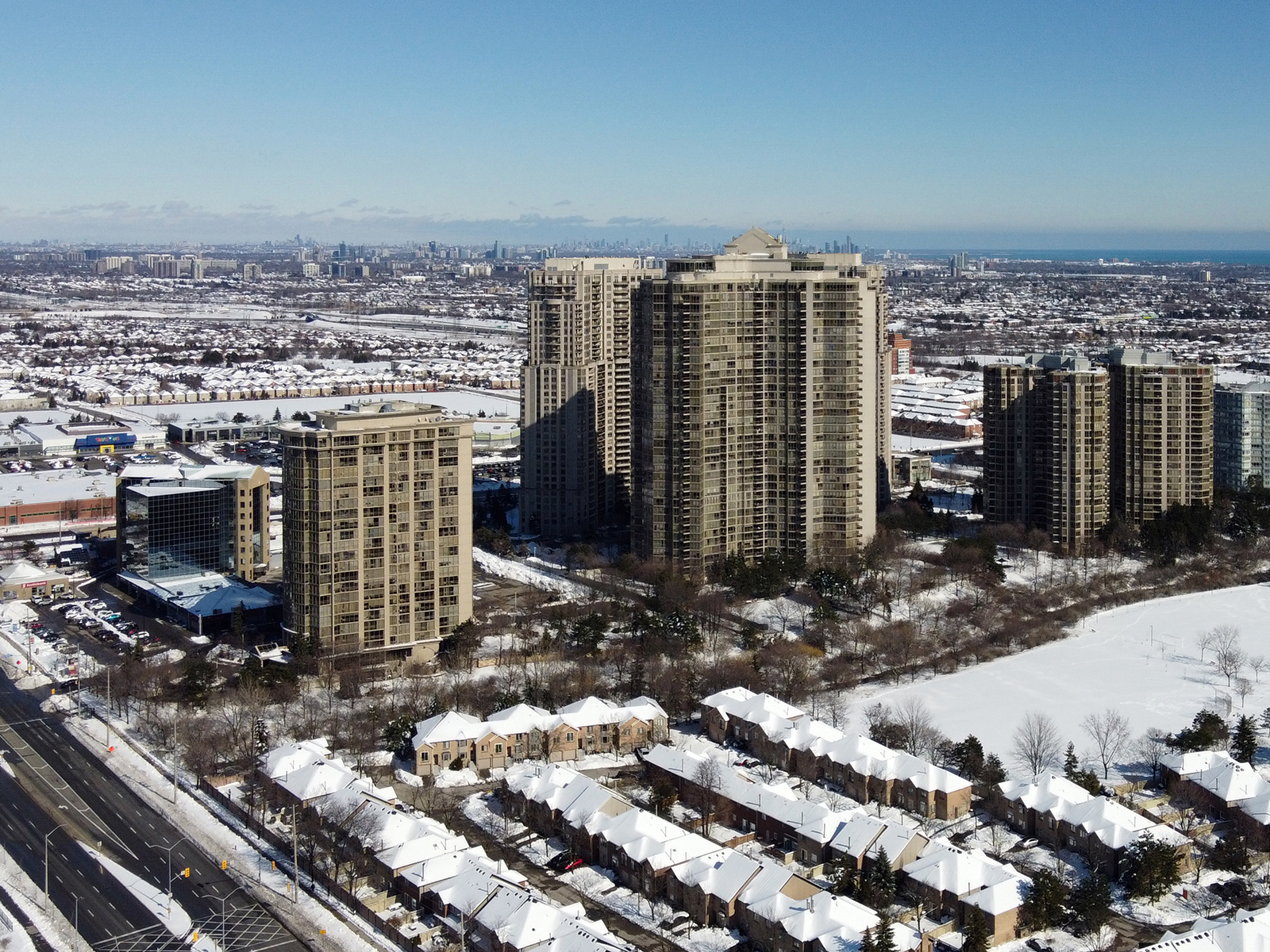
The Park Mansion

The Park Mansion is a 36-storey condominium tower in Mississauga, Ontario standing 112 metres (369 feet) tall. The building is located at 45 Kingsbridge Garden Circle.

It was built in 1990 (architects: Zippan and Barrett) and has over 350 luxury suites, many with views of the Greater Toronto Area.

Upon completion, it was the tallest building in Mississauga for an 18-year period until 2008; a year in which it was overtaken by 2 new buildings and tied by a third.
