= My City =

My City may refer to:

- "My City" (NCIS: New Orleans), a 2015 television episode
- "My City", a song by 24kGoldn, Kane Brown and G Herbo from the Fast X (soundtrack)
- "My City (Remix)", a song from YSL Records's 2021 compilation album Slime Language 2, featuring YTB Trench
- "My City", a song by Onefour featuring The Kid Laroi

== See also ==
- "In My City", a 2012 song by Priyanka Chopra featuring will.i.am
- "In My City", a song by Ellie Goulding from her 2012 album Halcyon
