= M City Condominiums =

Coordinates: 43°34′59″N 79°38′44″W

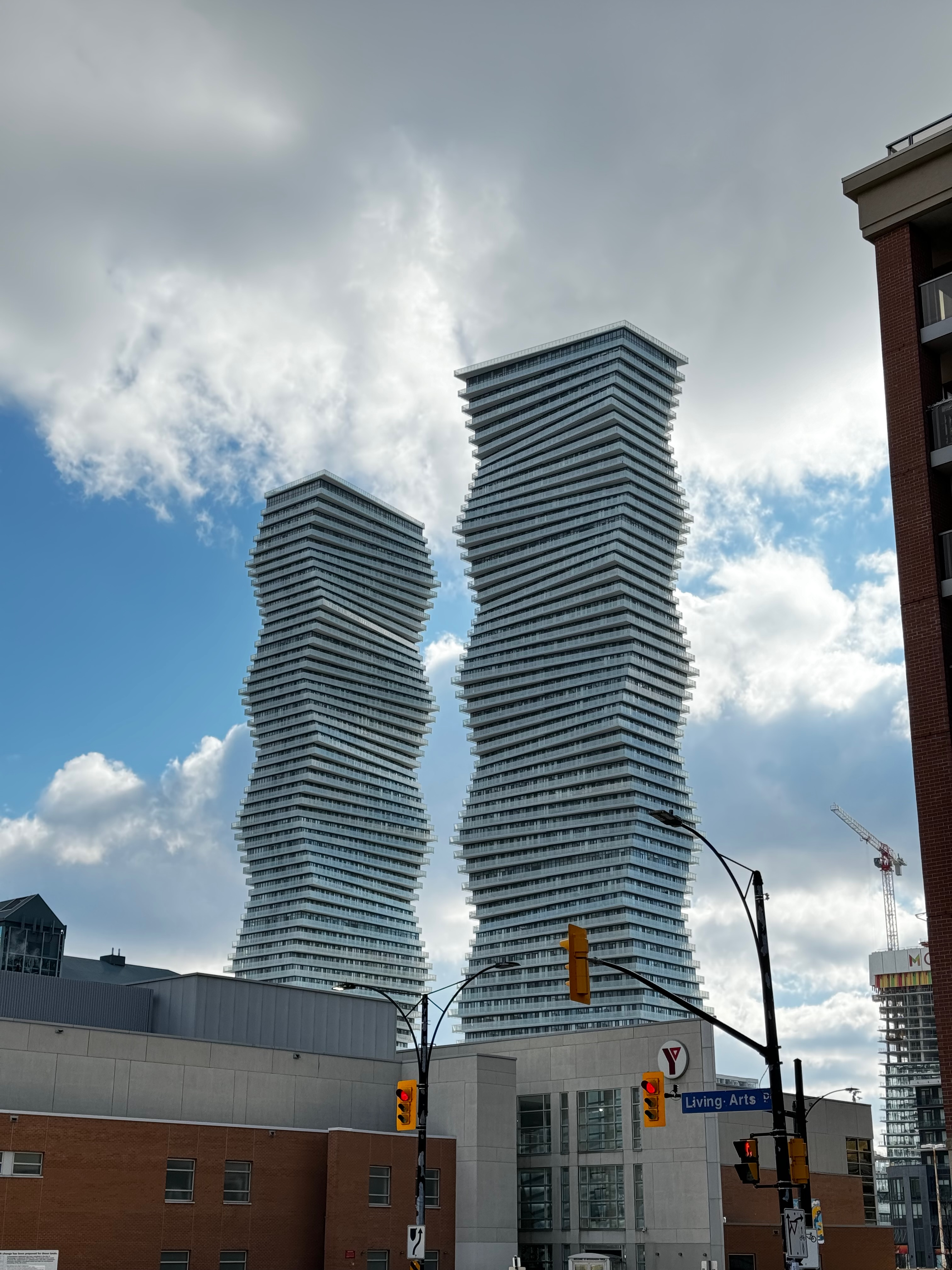
- M City Condominiums Towers 1 and 2, after their completion in November 2023.
- Interactive map of the M City Condominiums area

General information
- Status: Under construction
- Location: Burnhamthorpe Rd W and Confederation Pkwy, Mississauga, Canada
- Groundbreaking: April 24, 2018
- Owner: Rogers Real Estate Development Limited

Height
- Height: M1: 199 m; M2: 201 m; M3: 260 m; M4: 216 m; M5: 123 m; M6: 194 m

Technical details
- Floor count: M1: 60; M2: 61; M3: 81; M4: 67; M5: 36; M6: 57

Design and construction
- Architecture firm: CORE Architects; IBI Architects

Website
- mcitycondos.com

M City Condominiums, owned by Rogers Real Estate Development (“Rogers”) and developed by Urban Capital is a master-planned high-rise condominium community located at Burnhamthorpe Road and Confederation Parkway in the city centre of Mississauga, Ontario, Canada.

Construction on the complex started in 2018, and as of 2026, the first two towers are fully complete and occupied, with the third topped out, and the fourth and fifth towers under construction. Three additional towers are planned to complete the community.

The eight-tower, 15-acre, 4.3 million square foot mixed-use community will include condos, retail, office, green space, community amenities and two acres of public parkland. The tallest tower, M3, has 81 storeys, and with a height of 260 m tall, it is the tallest building in Mississauga and the upper-tier Region of Peel. Additionally, it is the tallest building in Canada outside Toronto.

== The Towers ==
=== Tower One – M1 ===
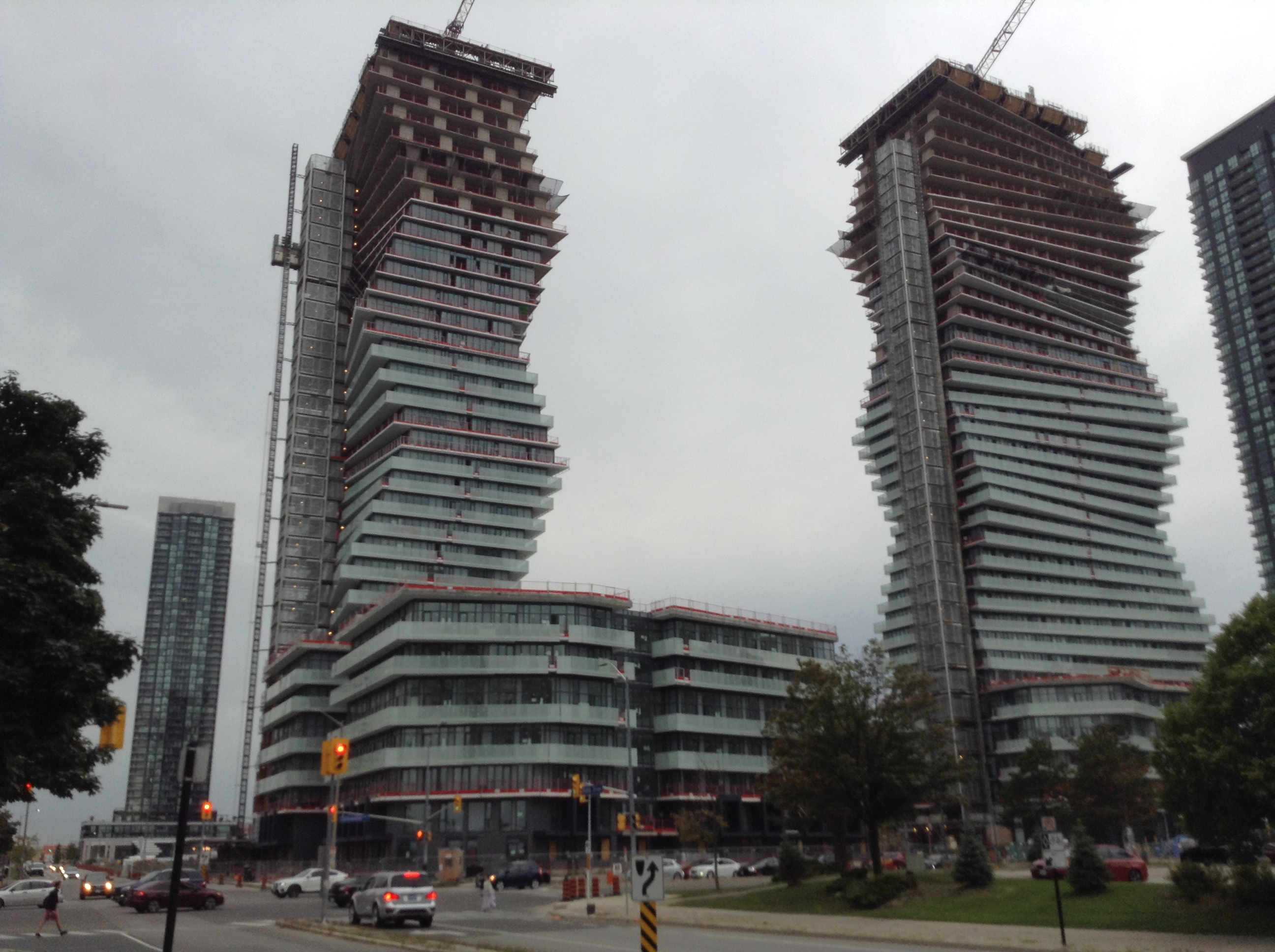
Towers 1 and 2 under construction in September 2021

M City launched its first tower, M1, in 2017. The 62-storey tower has an unconventional design with floor plates skewing and stacking in a repetitive pattern. Various amenities are available to residents, including the Greater Toronto Area’s first rooftop skating rink. The tower was completed in 2023. M1 is 198 m tall. M1, along with M2 and M4, were designed by CORE Architects.

=== Tower Two – M2 ===
M2 was launched in tandem with M1 as its twin building. The 62-storey tower includes townhomes at street level with condos above. Like M1, M2’s architecture features skewing and stacking floor plates and several amenity spaces, including a movie theatre and sports bar. M2 is 201 m tall with a rooftop skating rink under construction.

=== Tower Three – M3 ===
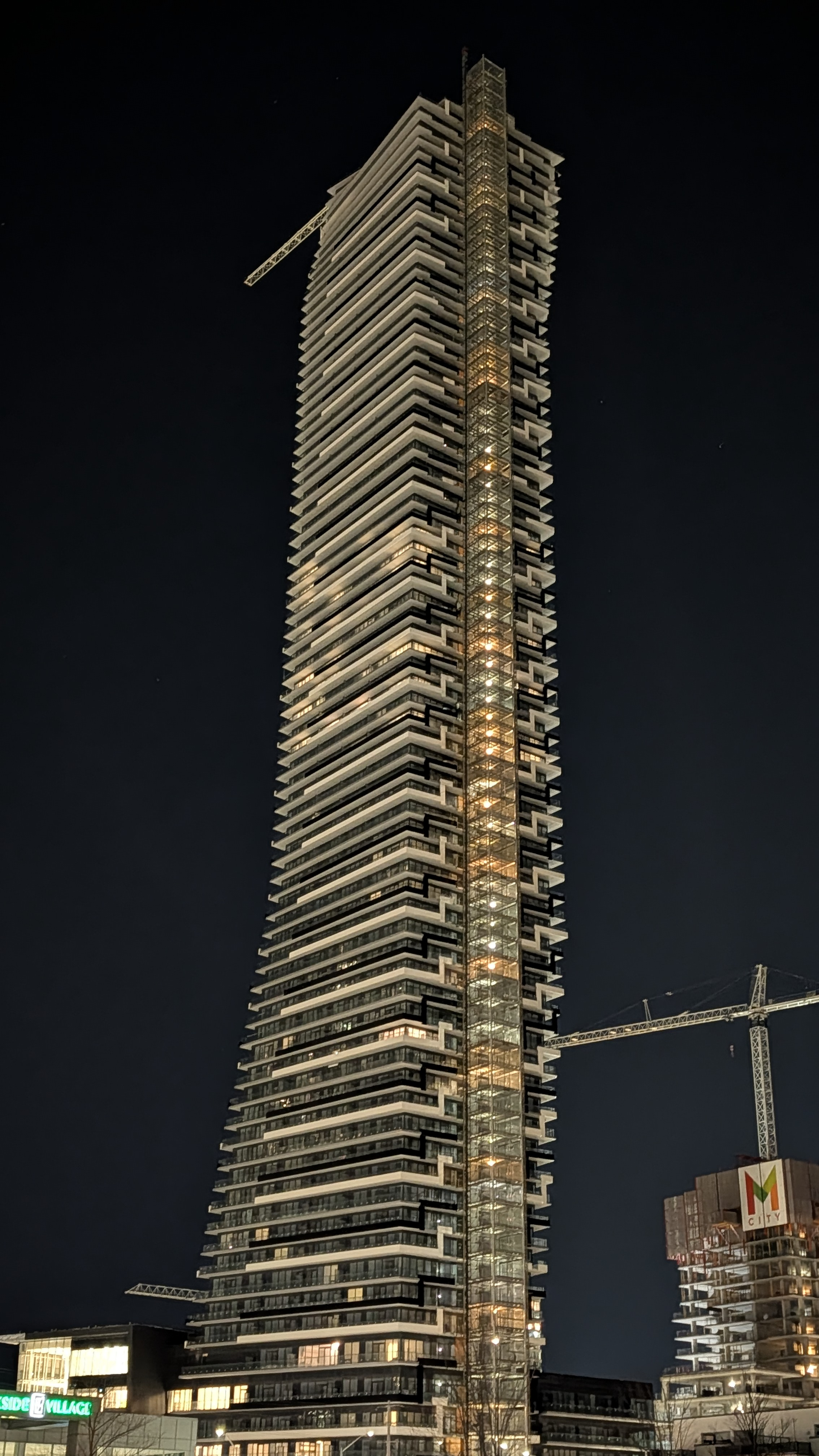
M3, topped off in 2026, is the tallest building in Canada outside of Toronto

Plans for M3 were officially unveiled by Rogers, Urban Capital, and Mayor Bonnie Crombie on September 24, 2018. M3 is Mississauga’s tallest tower at 81 storeys, 260.3 m, and became the 6th tallest in Canada upon topping out in 2026. The condominium will have 949 units when complete. The building features a 6-storey podium, a 7-level underground residential parking garage, and balconies in every suite.

M3’s indoor and outdoor amenities include a fitness centre, an indoor salt-water infinity pool with an outdoor sundeck, an outdoor living room with a TV, a private dining room and kitchen, a screening room, private event space, as well as a kids’ playground, splash pad, and games area. M3 was designed by IBI Group.

=== Tower Four – M4 ===
Launched in 2021, M4 is one of Canada's most technologically advanced condominiums.

Spanning 67 storeys, M4's architecture is defined by four slender, smaller towers that terminate at different heights in the sky.

M4 will also feature various indoor and outdoor amenity spaces. M4 started construction in winter of 2023.

=== Tower Five – M5 ===
M5 launched in 2022. The 36-storey, 430 suite tower is smaller in scale relative to the other towers in the M City community. M5's architecture features two connected staggered towers.

=== Tower Six – M6 ===
M6 Condos is a complex of three 57-storey buildings, boasts 900 residential units and represents the sixth condo building in the M City Condos series within the master-planned condominium community. The unit sizes range from 464 to 963 square feet, offering layouts that include studio, one-bedroom, two-bedroom, and townhouse suites. The tower was designed by Hariri Pontarini Architects.

== The Park ==
=== M Park ===
The M City community will feature over 2 acres of new parkland and a connection to the Mary Fix Trail and “Bud” Cleary Park.
