= Absolute World =

Twin residential skyscraper complex in Mississauga, Ontario

Absolute World Towers
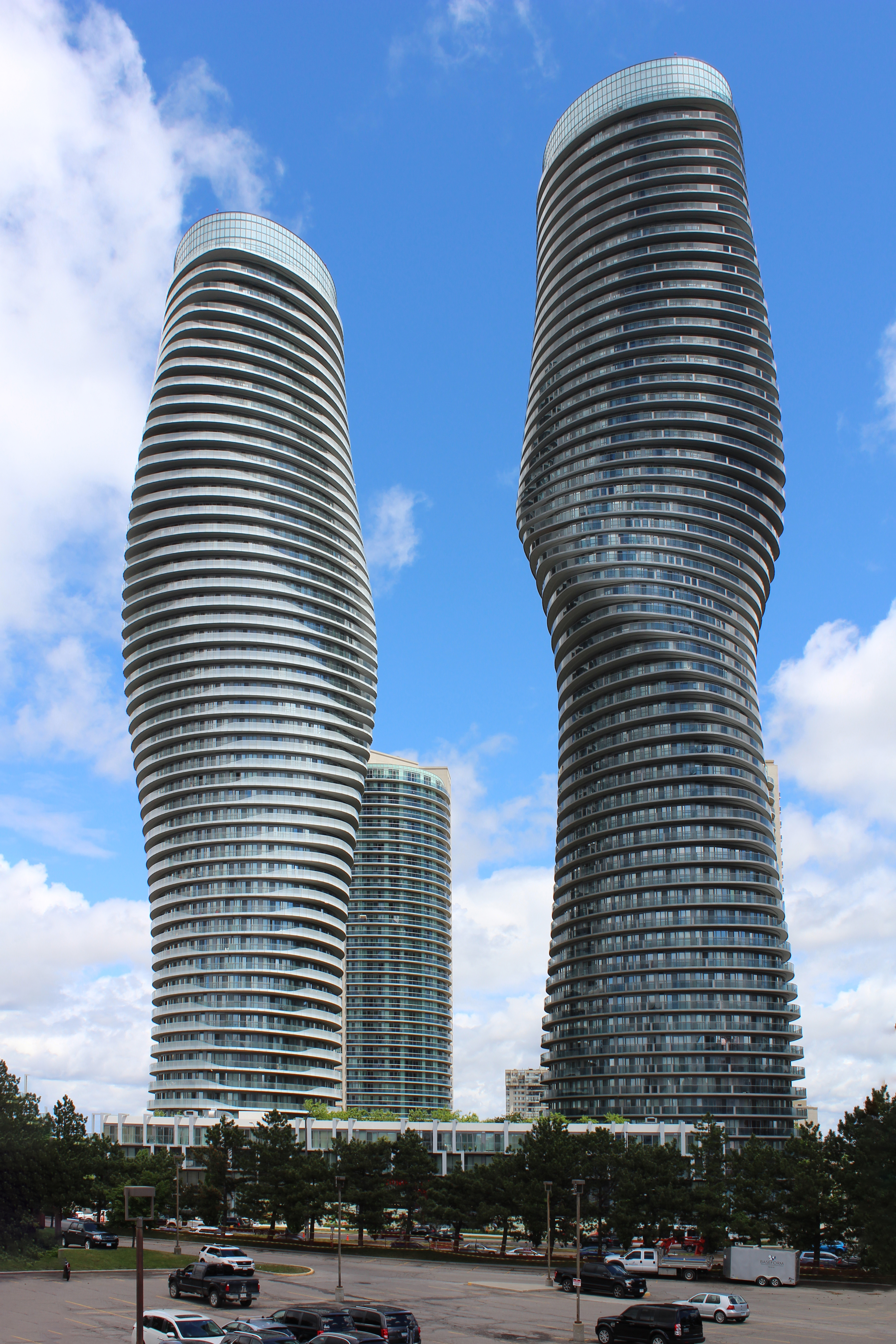
- Absolute World in 2018
- Alternative names: The Marilyn Monroe Towers

General information
- Type: Residential condominiums
- Location: 50–60 Absolute Avenue; Mississauga, Ontario, Canada
- Coordinates: 43°35′41″N 79°38′7″W
- Completed: 2007–2012
- Owner: Fernbrook Homes; Cityzen Development Group

Height
- Roof: Tower 1: 179.5 m (589 ft); Tower 2: 161.2 m (529 ft)

Technical details
- Floor count: Tower 1: 56 floors Tower 2: 50 floors
- Floor area: Recreation Centre: 2,800 m^{2} (30,000 sq ft)
- Lifts/elevators: 6 (per tower)

Design and construction
- Architects: Burka Architects; MAD Studio
- Developer: Fernbrook Homes; Cityzen Development Group
- Structural engineer: Sigmund Soudack & Associates
- Main contractor: Dominus Construction Group

Website
- www.50absoluteworld.ca www.60absolute.ca

Absolute World Towers is a residential condominium twin tower skyscraper complex in the five-tower Absolute City Centre development in Mississauga, Ontario, Canada. The project was built by Fernbrook Homes and Cityzen Development Group. With the first three towers completed (Absolute City Centre 1 and 2 and Absolute Vision), the last two towers (Absolute World 4 and 5) were topped off at 50 and 56 storeys. The complex's twin towers are nicknamed the "Marilyn Monroe Towers" due to their sinuous shape and design.

== Background ==
In 2004, an international design competition was held to select the architect for the fourth tower for Absolute World. Yansong Ma, founder of the MAD office, Beijing/China architectural design firm was announced the winner. Sales were to start in May 2007 with construction beginning later that year, and anticipated completion in 2009. Within days of the announcement, the taller building had been nicknamed the "Marilyn Monroe" tower due to its curvaceous, hourglass figure likened to actress Marilyn Monroe. Burka Varacalli Architects, a Toronto firm, was hired as MAD's local partner in April 2007.

On June 14, 2012, the Chicago-based Council on Tall Buildings and Urban Habitat, a non-profit group of architects and engineers, reported that the towers were among the world's best new skyscrapers. The building would also win the Emporis Skyscraper Award in 2012.

== Design ==
The larger of the two towers twists 209 degrees from the base to the top, making it similar to Turning Torso in Malmö, Sweden. The structural design was done by Sigmund Soudack & Associates Inc, a Toronto-based structural engineering firm. The tower has six levels of underground parking. The project managers were MAD, and Fernbrook.

== Gallery ==
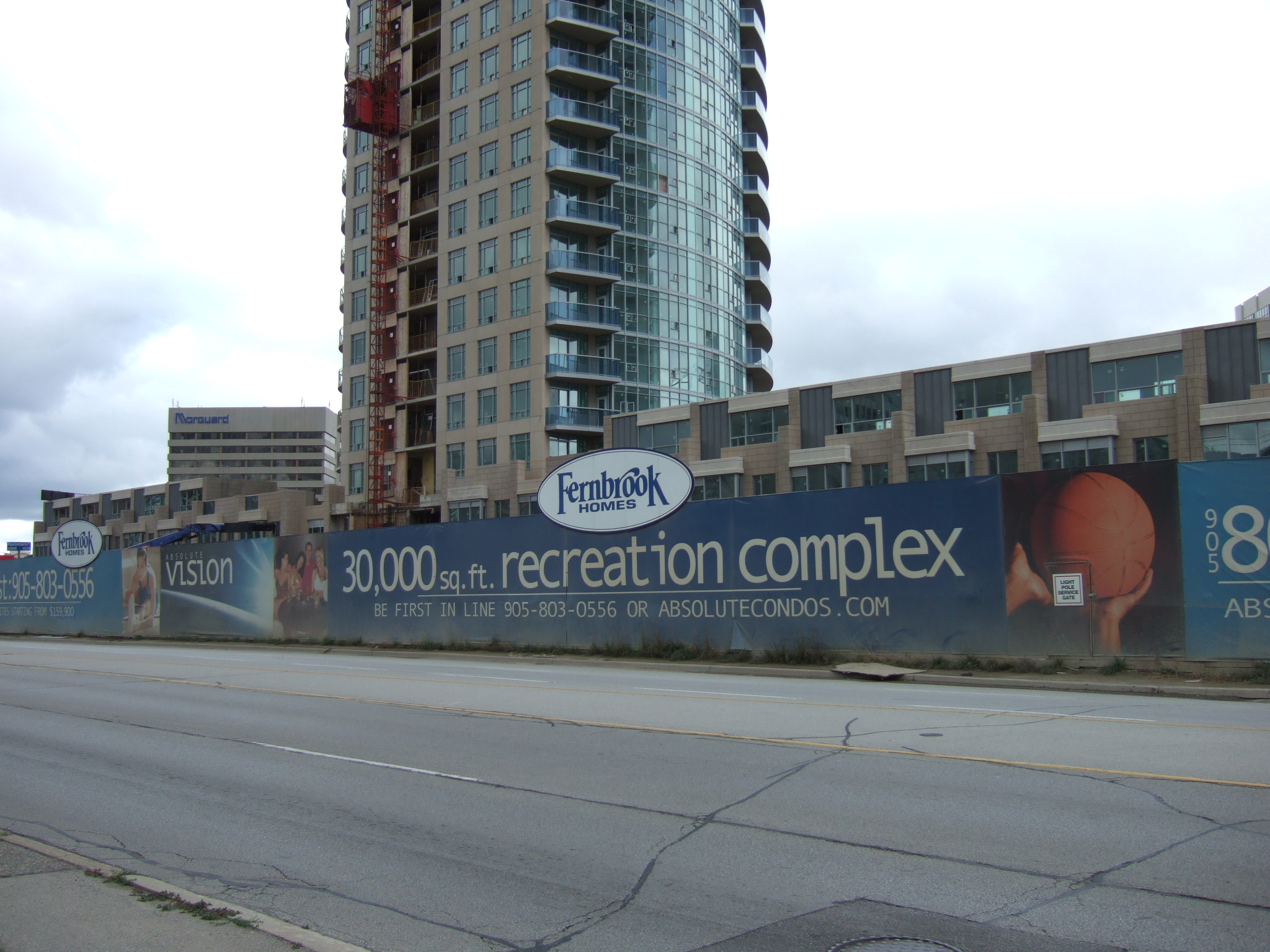
September 2006

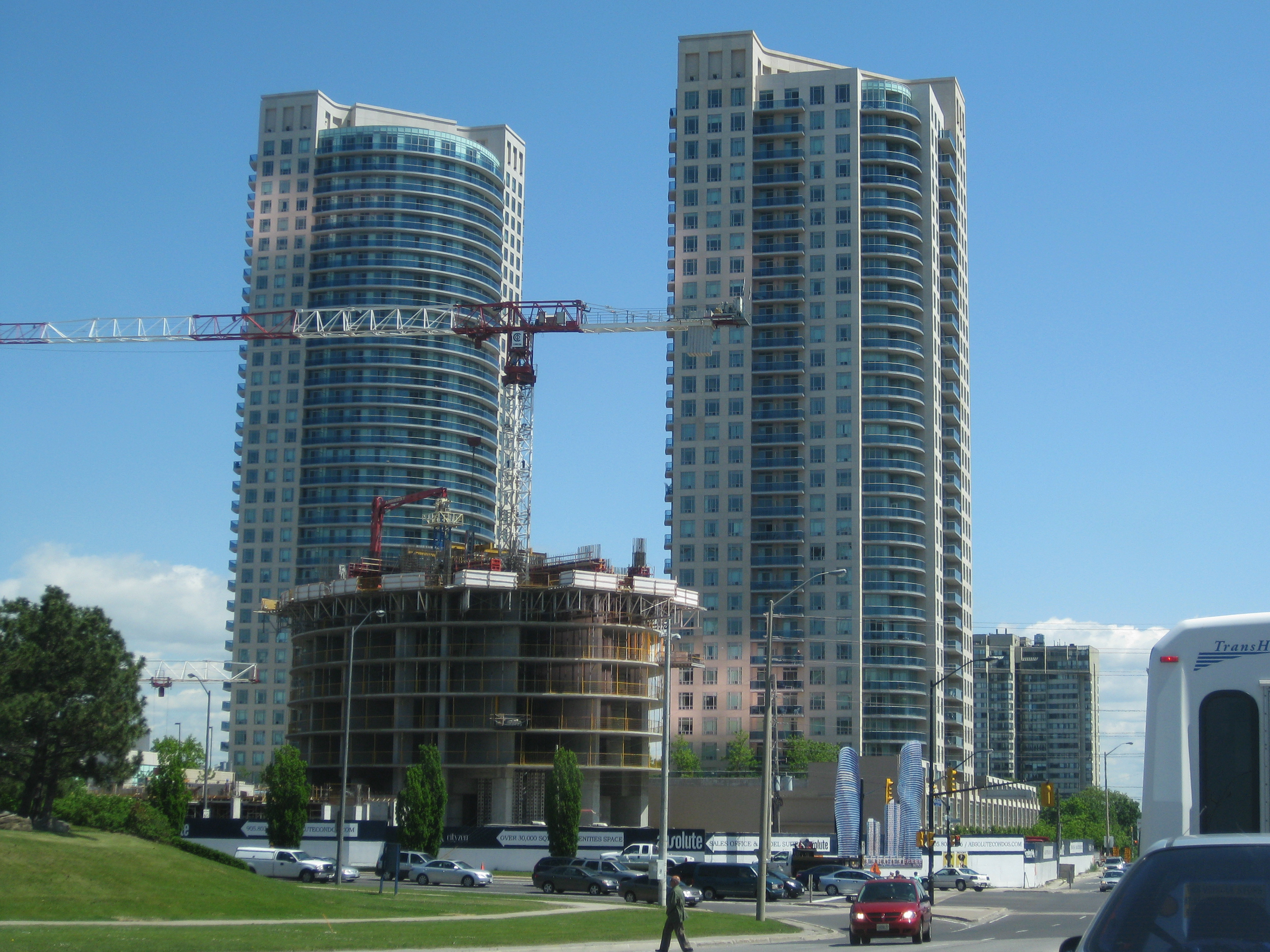
June 2009

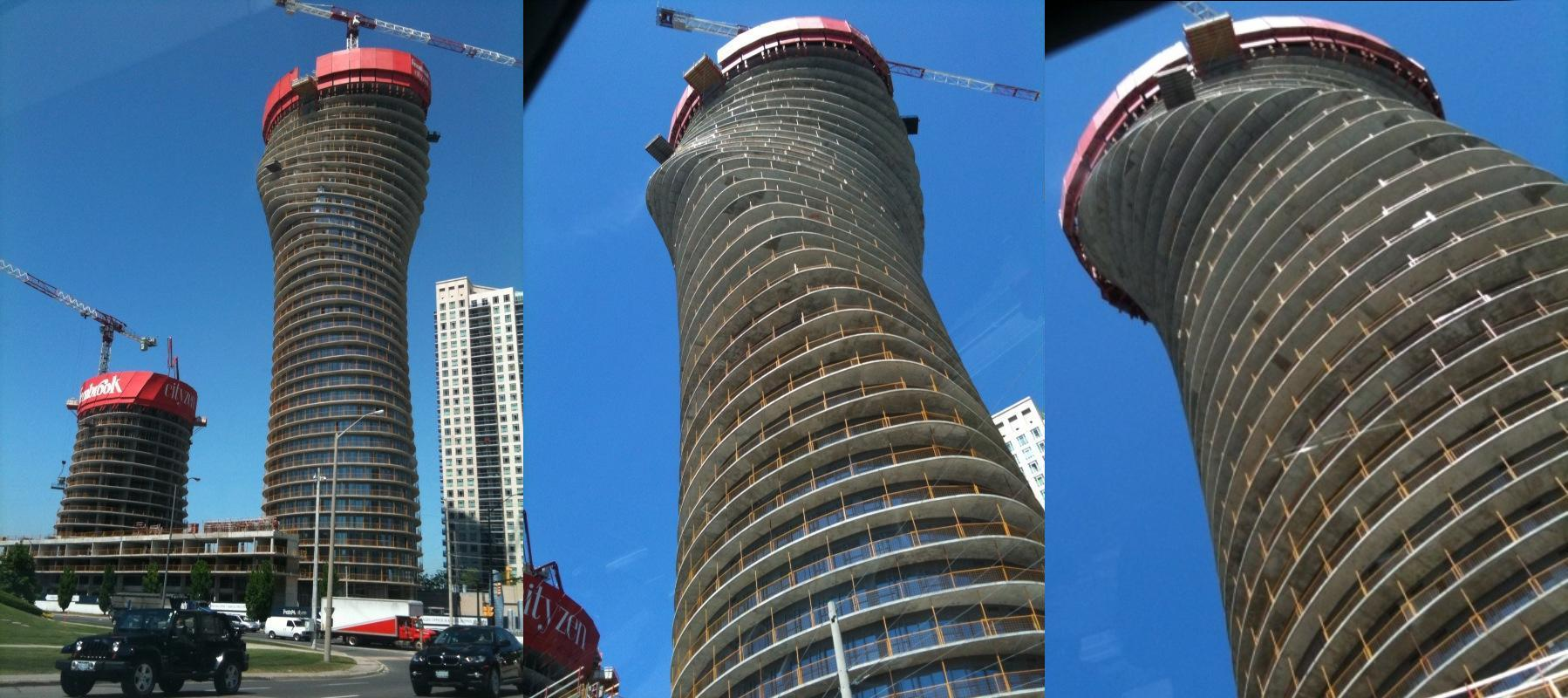
May 2010

Simplified plan and massing model of Tower 1 of Absolute World

== In popular culture ==
In 2025, Absolute World was featured on the cover of Canadian musicians PartyNextDoor and Drake's collaborative studio album Some Sexy Songs 4 U, with the duo pictured in front of the complex's twin towers at night while donning fur coats.

== See also ==
- List of tallest buildings in Mississauga
- List of twisted buildings
