= List of shopping malls in Canada =

This article is a list of notable shopping malls in Canada by province.

Canada's first indoor mall was the Lister Block, originally opened in 1852, in Hamilton, Ontario. The Lister Block was destroyed by fire and rebuilt in 1924. In 2011 the building was completely rebuilt.

Opened in 1949, the first shopping centre in Canada is the Norgate shopping centre, a shopping plaza in Saint-Laurent, Montreal, Quebec. The first enclosed shopping mall was the Park Royal Shopping Centre in West Vancouver, British Columbia, which opened a year later, in 1950. As of May 2017, there were 3,742 enclosed malls and shopping plazas in Canada that were larger than 40,000 square feet (3,700 m^{2}).

== Alberta ==
=== Calgary ===
- Bankers Hall
- Beddington Towne Centre
- Beddington Shopping Centre
- Bow Valley Square
- Central Landmark Mall
- Chinook Centre
- City Plaza Shopping Centre
- The CORE Shopping Centre — formerly Eaton Centre, TD Square
- Dragon City Mall
- Far East Shopping Centre
- Five Harvest Plaza
- Lake Bonavista Promenade
- Market Mall
- Marlborough Mall
- North Hill Centre
- Opulence Centre
- Pacific Place Mall — formerly Franklin Mall
- RioCan Brentwood — formerly Brentwood Village Shopping Centre
- Southcentre Mall
- Stephen Avenue Place — formerly Scotia Centre
- Sunridge Mall
- The Madison — contains a small enclosed mall portion underneath of an apartment complex
- Village Square Mall
- Westbrook Mall
- Woodbine Square

==== Former malls ====
- Deer Valley Marketplace — briefly abandoned; later turned into an outdoor shopping centre; was located in Deer Ridge
- Deerfoot Mall — demalled; redeveloped into Deerfoot City
- Eau Claire Market — abandoned then later demolished
- Glamorgan Shopping Centre — demalled; was located in Glamorgan
- Huntington Village Mall — abandoned then later demolished
- MacLeod Mall — demalled; was located in Acadia
- Midnapore Mall — demalled; was located in Midnapore
- Northland Village Mall — demalled; redeveloped into outdoor shopping centre
- Penny Lane Mall
- Richmond Mall — demalled; was located in Glenbrook
- TransCanada Centre — demalled; was located in Marlborough Park
- Zellers/Food Giant Mall — demolished and replaced with a Real Canadian Superstore

=== Edmonton ===
- Bonnie Doon Shopping Centre
- Commerce Place
- Edmonton City Centre — formerly Eaton Centre, Edmonton Centre
- HUB Mall
- Kingsway Mall
- Lessard Mall
- Londonderry Mall
- Meadowlark Health & Shopping Centre
- Millbourne Market Mall
- Mill Woods Town Centre
- National Bank Centre
- Northgate Centre
- Riverview Crossing — formerly Abbottsfield Shoppers Mall
- Southgate Centre
- West Edmonton Mall (Note: Largest mall in the world from 1981 to 2004. Currently 18th largest in the world and largest in North America) — the second largest mall in North America. and 18th largest in the world
- Westmount Centre — will be demalled starting in April 2026

==== Former malls ====
- Callingwood Marketplace — demalled
- Capilano Mall — demalled, mostly redeveloped into outdoor shopping plaza
- Heritage Mall — abandoned and then later demolished, redeveloped into Century Park
- North Town Centre — demalled
- Petrolia Mall — demalled
- Tweddle Place Shopping Centre — demolished

=== Other Alberta malls ===
- Balzac
  - CrossIron Mills
  - New Horizon Mall
- Banff
  - Bear Street Mall
  - Cascade Shops
  - Clock Tower Village Mall
  - Harmony Lane Mall
  - Park Avenue Mall
  - Sundance Mall
  - Wolf & Bear Mall
- Canmore
  - 710 Main St.
  - 826 Main St.
  - Kendal Mall
  - Riverstone Place
  - Shaman Lane
- Cold Lake
  - Tri City Mall
- Grande Cache
  - Acorn Plaza Mall
  - Grande Cache Town Mall
- Grande Prairie
  - Prairie Mall
  - Towne Centre Mall
- Hinton
  - Parks West Mall
- Lacombe
  - Lacombe Centre
- Leduc
  - City Centre Mall
  - Premium Outlet Collection Edmonton International Airport
- Lethbridge
  - Centre Village Mall
  - Melcor Centre (originally Lethbridge Centre)
  - Park Meadows Mall
  - Park Place Mall
- Lloydminster
  - Lloyd Mall
- Medicine Hat
  - Medicine Hat Mall
- Peace River
  - Riverdrive Mall
- Red Deer
  - Bower Place
  - Parkland Mall
- Sherwood Park
  - Sherwood Park Mall — formerly Eastgate Mall
- Spruce Grove
  - Westland Market Mall
- St. Albert
  - St. Albert Centre
- Wetaskiwin
  - Wetaskiwin Mall
- Vermilion
  - Lakeland Mall

==== Former malls ====
- Charles Reid Mall – mall that was demalled that was located in Banff
- College Value Mall — mall that was demalled that was located in Lethbridge
- County Fair Mall — mall that was demalled that was located in Lethbridge
- Fort Mall — mall that was demalled/demolished that was located in Fort Saskatchewan
- Towerlane Mall — mall that was demalled that was located in Airdrie
- St. Paul Shopping Centre — mall that was demalled that was located in St. Paul

== Atlantic Canada ==
=== New Brunswick ===
- Moncton
  - Champlain Place
- Riverview
  - Riverview Mall
- Saint John
  - Brunswick Square
  - McAllister Place
  - Prince Edward Square
- St. George
  - St. George Mall

==== Former Malls ====
- Crystal Palace (Bass Pro Complex) — mall that was demalled that was located in Dieppe
- Highfield Square — abandoned and later demolished, was located in Downtown Moncton
- Lancaster Crossing — was located in Saint John
- Oromocto Mall — mall that was demalled that was located in Oromocto

=== Newfoundland and Labrador ===
- Carbonear
  - Trinity-Conception Square — on Route 70
- Corner Brook
  - Corner Brook Plaza — on Maple Valley Road
  - Valley Mall - on Mount Bernard
  - Millbrook Mall
- Labrador City
  - Labrador Mall
- St. John's
  - Avalon Mall — on Kenmount Road
  - Village Mall — on Topsail Road

=== Nova Scotia ===
- Halifax region
  - Bedford
    - Bedford Place
    - Sunnyside Mall
  - Dartmouth
    - Mic Mac Mall
  - Halifax
    - Halifax Shopping Centre
    - Maritime Mall (Maritime Centre)
    - Park Lane
    - Scotia Square
- New Glasgow
  - Highland Square
- New Minas
  - County Fair Mall
- Sydney
  - Mayflower Mall
- Truro
  - The Hub Shopping Centre (Truro Mall)
- Yarmouth
  - Yarmouth Mall

==== Former malls ====
- Penhorn Mall — mall that was demalled/demolished in Dartmouth

=== Prince Edward Island ===
- Charlottetown
  - SmartCentres Charlottetown
  - Royalty Crossing (Charlottetown Mall)

== British Columbia ==
=== Fraser Valley and BC Interior ===
- Abbotsford
  - Sevenoaks Shopping Centre
  - High Street Shopping Centre
- Kamloops
  - Aberdeen Mall
- Kelowna
  - Orchard Park Shopping Centre
- Penticton
  - Cherry Lane Shopping Centre
- Prince George
  - Pine Centre Mall
- Vernon
  - Village Green Centre

=== Greater Vancouver ===
- Burnaby
  - The Amazing Brentwood
  - The City of Lougheed
  - Crystal Mall
  - Metropolis at Metrotown — fifth largest mall in Canada
  - Station Square
- Coquitlam
  - Coquitlam Centre
  - Henderson Place Mall
- Delta
  - Scottsdale Centre
  - Tsawwassen Mills
- Langley Township
  - Willowbrook Shopping Centre
- New Westminster
  - Royal City Centre
  - Shops at New West
- City of North Vancouver
  - Capilano Mall
  - Lonsdale Quay
- District of North Vancouver
  - Edgemont Village
  - Lynn Valley Centre
- Richmond
  - Aberdeen Centre
  - Lansdowne Centre
  - Parker Place
  - Richmond Centre
  - Yaohan Centre
- Surrey
  - Central City
  - Guildford Town Centre
  - Semiahmoo Shopping Centre
- Vancouver
  - Bentall Centre
  - City Square Shopping Centre
  - Harbour Centre
  - Il Mercato Centre
  - International Village
  - Oakridge Park
  - Pacific Centre
  - Royal Centre
  - Sinclair Centre
- West Vancouver
  - Park Royal — first enclosed shopping centre in Canada

=== Northwest British Columbia ===
- Houston
  - Houston Shopping Centre
- Prince Rupert
  - Ocean Centre
  - Pollyco (formerly Rupert Square)

=== Vancouver Island ===
- Nanaimo
  - Port Place Shopping Centre
  - Woodgrove Centre
  - Nanaimo North Town Centre
  - Country Club Centre
  - Brooks Landing Shopping Centre
  - Port Place Shopping Centre
- Parksville
  - Wembley Mall
- Port Alberni
  - Alberni Mall
  - Pacific Rim Shopping Centre
- Victoria/Greater Victoria
  - Bay Centre
  - Hillside Shopping Centre
  - Market Square
  - Mayfair Shopping Centre
  - Tillicum Centre
  - Westshore Town Centre (formerly Can West Mall)

==== Former malls ====
- Duncan Mall — mall that was demalled that was located in Duncan

== Manitoba ==
- Brandon
  - Brandon Shoppers Mall
- Leaf Rapids
  - Town Centre Complex
- Thompson
  - City Centre
  - The Plaza
  - Westwood Mall
- Winnipeg
  - Cityplace
  - Garden City Shopping Centre
  - Grant Park Shopping Centre
  - Kildonan Place
  - Outlet Collection Winnipeg
  - Polo Park Shopping Centre — 15th largest mall in Canada
  - St. Vital Centre
  - Shops of Winnipeg Square — underground mall
- The Pas
  - Otineka Mall
  - The Pas Shopping Centre

=== Former malls ===
- Winnipeg
  - Portage Place — demalled and turned into an outdoor shopping centre
  - Unicity Mall

== Ontario ==
=== Central and Eastern Ontario ===
- Barrie
  - Georgian Mall
- Kingston
  - Cataraqui Town Centre
- Peterborough
  - Lansdowne Place

=== Golden Horseshoe ===
- Brampton
  - Bramalea City Centre
  - Shoppers World Brampton
- Burlington
  - Burlington Centre
  - Mapleview Centre
- Hamilton
  - Centre Mall
  - Eastgate Square
  - Jackson Square
  - Lime Ridge Mall
- Markham
  - First Markham Place
  - King Square Shopping Centre
  - Langham Square
  - Markville Shopping Centre
  - Pacific Mall
- Mississauga
  - Dixie Outlet Mall
  - Erin Mills Town Centre
  - Heartland Town Centre
  - Sheridan Centre
  - Square One Shopping Centre
  - Westwood Square Mall
- Newmarket
  - Upper Canada Mall
- Niagara-on-the-Lake
  - Outlet Collection at Niagara
- Oakville
  - Oakville Place
- Oshawa
  - Oshawa Centre
- Pickering
  - Pickering Town Centre
- Richmond Hill
  - Hillcrest Mall
- St. Catharines
  - The Pen Centre
- Vaughan
  - Improve Canada
  - The Promenade Shopping Centre
  - Vaughan Mills
- Welland
  - Seaway Mall

=== Northern Ontario ===
- Northeastern Ontario
  - Elliot Lake
    - Pearson Plaza
  - Sault Ste. Marie
    - Cambrian Mall
    - Market Mall
    - Station Mall
  - Sudbury
    - New Sudbury Centre
  - Temiskaming Shores
    - Timiskaming Square
  - Timmins
    - Timmins Square
- Northwestern Ontario
  - Thunder Bay
    - Intercity Shopping Centre

==== Former malls ====
- Wellington Square - formerly located in Sault Ste. Marie

=== Ottawa ===
- Bayshore Shopping Centre
- Billings Bridge Plaza
- Carlingwood Mall
- College Square
- Elmvale Acres Shopping Centre
- Fairlawn Centre
- Freiman Mall
- Hazeldean Mall
- Merivale Mall
- Place d'Orléans
- Rideau Centre
- St. Laurent Shopping Centre

==== Former malls ====
- Lincoln Fields Shopping Centre
- Westgate Shopping Centre

=== Southwestern Ontario ===
- Brantford
  - Lynden Park Mall
- Cambridge
  - Cambridge Centre
- Chatham-Kent
  - One Hundred KING
- Guelph
  - Stone Road Mall
- Kitchener
  - Fairview Park Mall
  - St. Jacobs Outlets
- Leamington
  - Leamington Mall
  - Leamington County Fair Mall
- London
  - Cherryhill Village Mall
  - Citi Plaza
  - Covent Garden Market
  - Masonville Place
  - Northland Mall
  - Oxbury Centre
  - Sherwood Forest Mall
  - Talbot Centre Mall
  - Westmount Mall
  - White Oaks Mall
- Sarnia
  - Lambton Mall
- Simcoe
  - Simcoe Town Centre
- Strathroy
  - The Shops on Sydenham
- St. Thomas
  - Elgin Centre
- Tillsonburg
  - Tillsonburg Town Centre
- Waterloo
  - Conestoga Mall
- Windsor
  - Devonshire Mall
  - Dougall Square
  - Tecumseh Mall
  - Windsor Crossing Premium Outlets

==== Former malls ====
- White Woods Mall — mall that was located in Amherstburg
- Brantford Mall — mall that was located in Brantford
- Eaton Market Square — mall that was located in Brantford
- Thames-Lea Plaza — mall that was located in Chatham-Kent
- North Maple Mall — mall that was located in Chatham-Kent
- Argyle Mall — mall that was located in London
- London Mall — mall that was located in London
- London Mews — mall that was located in London
- Oakridge Mall — mall that was located in London
- Superstore Mall — mall that was located in London
- Bayside Centre — mall that was located in Sarnia
- Wallaceburg County Fair Mall — mall that was located in Wallaceburg
- University Mall — mall that was located in Windsor
- Woodstock Plaza — mall that was located in Woodstock
- Blandford Square Mall — mall that was located in Woodstock

== Quebec ==
=== Montreal ===
- Alexis Nihon
- 1000 de la Gauchetière
- Carrefour Angrignon (LaSalle)
- Centre Rockland (Mont-Royal)
- Complexe Desjardins
- Fairview Pointe-Claire (Pointe-Claire)
- Galeries d'Anjou (Anjou)
- Montreal Eaton Centre — combined with Complexe Les Ailes as of 2018
- Norgate shopping centre (Saint-Laurent) — first mall in Canada
- Place Montréal Trust
- Place Versailles
- Place Vertu (Saint-Laurent)
- Promenades Cathédrale
- Royalmount (Mont-Royal)
- Westmount Square (Westmount) (Mall version)

=== Greater Montreal ===
- Brossard
  - Champlain Mall
  - Place Portobello
  - Quartier DIX30
- Laval
  - Carrefour Laval
  - Centre Laval
- Longueuil
  - Centre Jacques-Cartier
  - Place Longueuil
- Pointe-Claire
  - Fairview Pointe-Claire
- Rosemere, Quebec
  - Place Rosemère
- Saint-Bruno-de-Montarville
  - Promenades Saint-Bruno
- Saint-Jérôme
  - Carrefour du Nord
- Sorel-Tracy
  - Les Promenades de Sorel

=== Quebec City area ===
- Lévis
  - Les Galeries Chagnon
- Quebec City
  - Fleur de Lys centre commercial
  - Galeries de la Capitale
  - Laurier Québec
  - Place Sainte-Foy
- Saint-Georges
  - Carrefour Saint-Georges

=== Other Quebec malls ===
- Chicoutimi
  - Place du Royaume
- Gatineau
  - Les Galeries de Hull
  - Les Promenades Gatineau
- Granby
  - Galeries de Granby
- Sherbrooke
  - Carrefour de l'Estrie

== Saskatchewan ==
- Estevan
  - Estevan Shoppers' Mall
- North Battleford
  - Frontier Centre
- Prince Albert
  - Gateway Mall
  - South Hill Mall
- Regina
  - Cornwall Centre
  - Northgate Mall
  - Southland Mall
  - Victoria Square
- Saskatoon
  - The Centre
  - Confederation Mall
  - Lawson Heights Mall
  - Market Mall
  - Midtown Plaza
- Swift Current
  - Swift Current Mall
  - Wheatland Mall
- Weyburn
  - Weyburn Square
- Yorkton
  - Parkland Mall

== Northern Canada ==
- Northwest Territories
  - Yellowknife
    - Centre Square Mall
- Yukon
  - Whitehorse
    - Horwoods Mall
    - Qwanlin Mall

== See also ==
- List of largest enclosed shopping malls in Canada
- List of shopping malls in the United States
