= Wise Stores =

Canadian department store chain

Wise Stores inc.
- Industry: Department store
- Founded: 1930
- Founder: Alex Wise
- Defunct: 1995
- Fate: Bankruptcy
- Headquarters: Montreal, Quebec, Canada,

Wise Stores was a department store chain located in Eastern Canada. It was founded in 1930 in Montreal by Alex Wise.

By October 1988, the company had 28 stores and acquired 15 Continental outlets in eastern Quebec, New Brunswick and Ontario to bring to 43 the total number of Wise locations.

In 1992, the company acquired the even longer running and competitor Peoples department stores from British retailer Marks & Spencer. Under the terms of the purchase, the Wise and Peoples chains could not completely merge until the outstanding balance owed to Marks & Spencer for the transaction had completely been paid in full. Because of this restriction, Peoples was instead operated as a subsidiary of Wise.

Wise was basically a discount department retailer with store dimensions averaging those of Hart, Greenberg and Peoples; in contrast to the larger-sized Zellers, Woolco and Kmart. Wise launched in June 1993 the chain Wizmart, a wholesale concept specialized in the sales of good derived from bankruptcies and closings. At its peak, the company operated five divisions: Wise Stores inc. (48 stores), Peoples Stores inc. (178 stores), Wizmart, KLHR Liquidation, and NRMA.

On December 15, 1994, the company announced the shuttering of 13 Wise and Wizmart stores. The announcement would leave the Wizmart division with only location.

Peoples declared bankruptcy on January 13, 1995, while Wise avoided it but would still get liquidated anyway. Wise eventually went bankrupt too on January 31, 1995. Wise's incapacity of paying the amount it owed Marks & Spencer for the Peoples acquisition was the main reason for the demise of both chains. There were 53 Wise and 73 Peoples stores in operation at bankruptcy. The original Wise store operated throughout the entire 65 years of the company on the same address at 6751 Saint Hubert Street in the La Petite-Patrie neighbourhoud. Its founder Alex Wise was still chairman of the company as late as December 1994. He died on January 12, 2004 at the age of 96 and one of his three sons who presided the company with him, Ralph, passed on October 21, 2015.

29 of Wise and Peoples's vacated spaces became Hart Stores in August 1995. Another 27 former locations of Wise/Peoples were acquired also in August 1995 by Winnipeg-based Gendis which used them to open mainly new Metropolitan Stores and to a lesser extend stores from its other banners such as Red Apple and Greenberg. Six other stores (all Wise locations) had already been sold in March 1995 to Rossy by the liquidator in charge of disposing the bankrupt retail chain.

Peoples logo

== Locations ==
=== Quebec ===
- Boucherville — Place Pierre Boucher
- Chandler — Rue Commerciale
- Chandler — Place du Hâvre (Peoples store)
- Chateauguay — Rue Anjou
- Delson — Plaza Delson
- Dolbeau — Promenades du Boulevard
- Gaspé — Place Jacques-Cartier
- Greenfield Park — Place Greenfield Park
- Joliette — Les Galeries Joliette
- Kenogami — Rue Ste-Famille
- Lachute — Carrefour Argenteuil
- LaSalle —Centre Le Cavalier
- Laval — Carrefour Laval
- Laval — Centre Saint-Martin
- Longueuil — Centre Jacques-Cartier
- Longueuil — Chemin de Chambly (Carrefour Super C)
- Montmagny — Galeries Montmagny
- Montreal — Iberville Street
- Montreal — Plaza Côte-des-Neiges
- Montreal — Plaza Saint-Hubert
- Montréal-Nord — Place Levasseur
- Paspebiac — Plaza Paspebiac.
- Pierrefonds — Pierrefonds Boul.
- Quebec — Carrefour Soumande
- Rouyn-Noranda — Les Promenades du Cuivre
- Saint-Félicien — Carrefour St-Félicien (Peoples store)
- Saint-Jean-sur-Richelieu — Carrefour Richelieu
- Saint-Jérôme — Carrefour du Nord
- Sainte-Foy — Place Laurier
- Sainte-Foy — Place Sainte-Foy
- Saint Léonard — Jean-Talon Street East
- Sherbrooke — Carrefour de l'Estrie
- Victoriaville — Boulevard des Bois-Francs N. (Place Sogestec)

=== Nova Scotia ===
- Bridgewater — Bridgewater Mall
- Dartmouth — Mic Mac Mall
- Glace Bay — Commercial Street
- Liverpool — Main Street
- Truro — Truro Mall

=== New Brunswick ===
- Bathurst — Chaleur Centre Mall
- Tracadie — Rue Principale
- Shediac — Rue Main

=== Ontario ===
- Cornwall — Pitt Street
- Hawkesbury — Main Street

== See also ==
Peoples Department Stores Inc. (Trustee of) v. Wise
