= Yarmouth Mall =

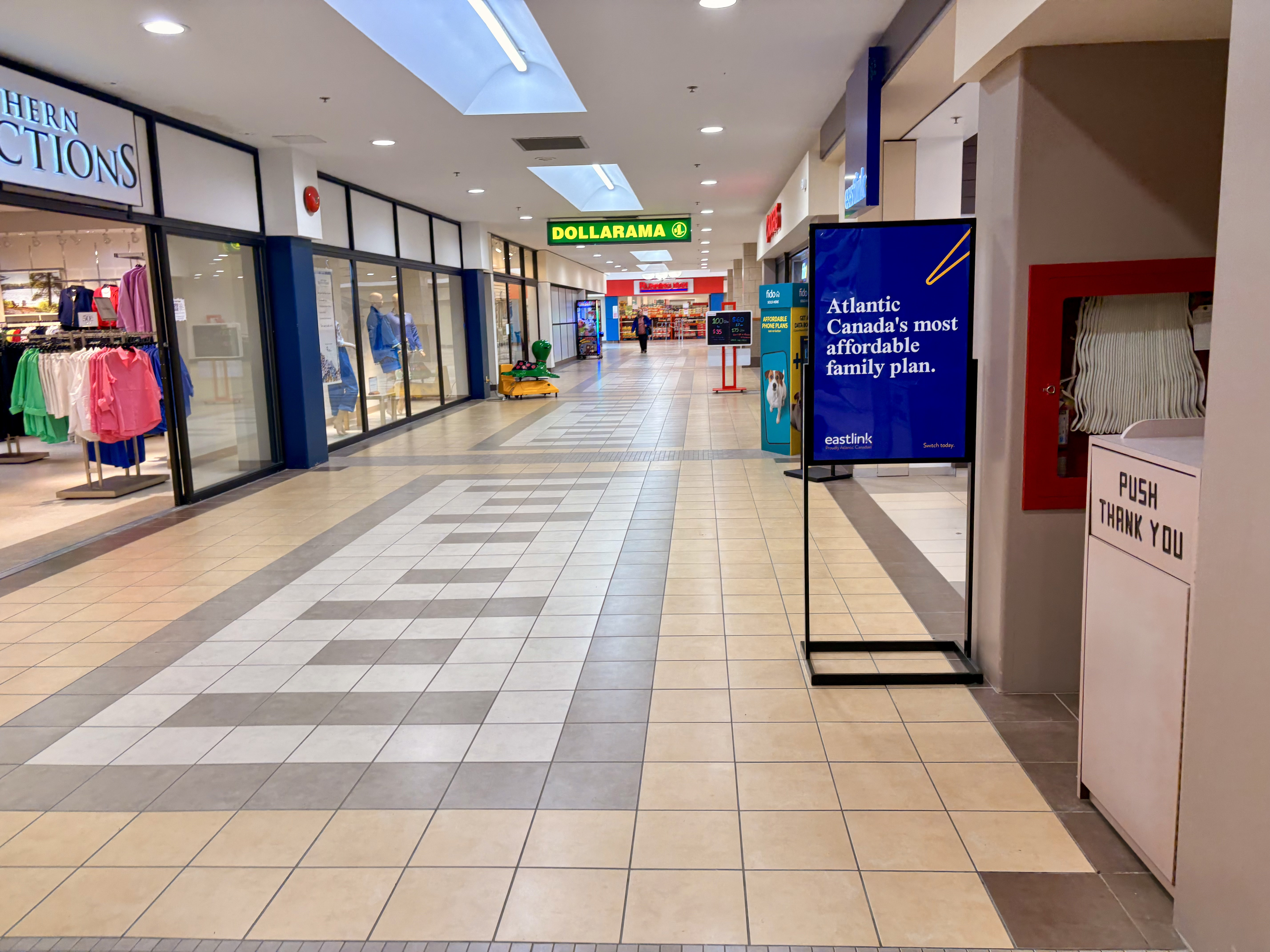
- Interior in March 2026
- Location: Yarmouth, Nova Scotia, Canada
- Coordinates: 43°50′38.8″N 66°6′20.0″W
- Address: 76 Starrs Road, Yarmouth, NS B5A 2T5
- Opened: 1973
- Owner: Toulon Development Corp.
- Num. of stores: 34
- Floor area: 261,000 sq. ft.
- Floors: 1
- Public transit: Yarmouth Transit
- Website: www.yarmouthmall.ca

Yarmouth Mall is a 261,000 sq. ft. shopping mall in Yarmouth, Nova Scotia, Canada. It is the only currently operating enclosed mall in Yarmouth County.

== History ==
Yarmouth Mall opened in 1973 with anchor tenants Sobeys and Zellers, the latter moving from downtown Yarmouth.

Hart opened during the mid-1980s after a mall renovation and expansion. It would later be downgraded to the Bargain Giant chain, then close in 2008, later being replaced with Sport Chek.

Zellers closed on March 16, 2013. It was split into multiple tenants, including Go Power Sports, Great Canadian Dollar Store (now Dollarama), Rossy (now Hart) and Winners.

== Stores ==
Anchor tenants:

- Dollarama (15,309 sq. ft.)
- Hart (22,128 sq. ft.)
- Running Man Grocery Mart (14,000 sq. ft.)
- Sport Chek (12,000 sq. ft.)
- Sobeys (48,953 sq. ft.)
- Winners (20,862 sq. ft.)

Former notable tenants:

- Great Canadian Dollar Store, closed in 2023, now Dollarama.
- Lawtons Drugs, closed in 2022, now Running Man Grocery Mart.
- Rossy, closed on July 17, 2025, now Hart.
- Sears, closed in 2017.
- Zellers, closed on March 26, 2013.

== See also ==
- List of shopping malls in Canada
