= County Fair Mall (New Minas) =

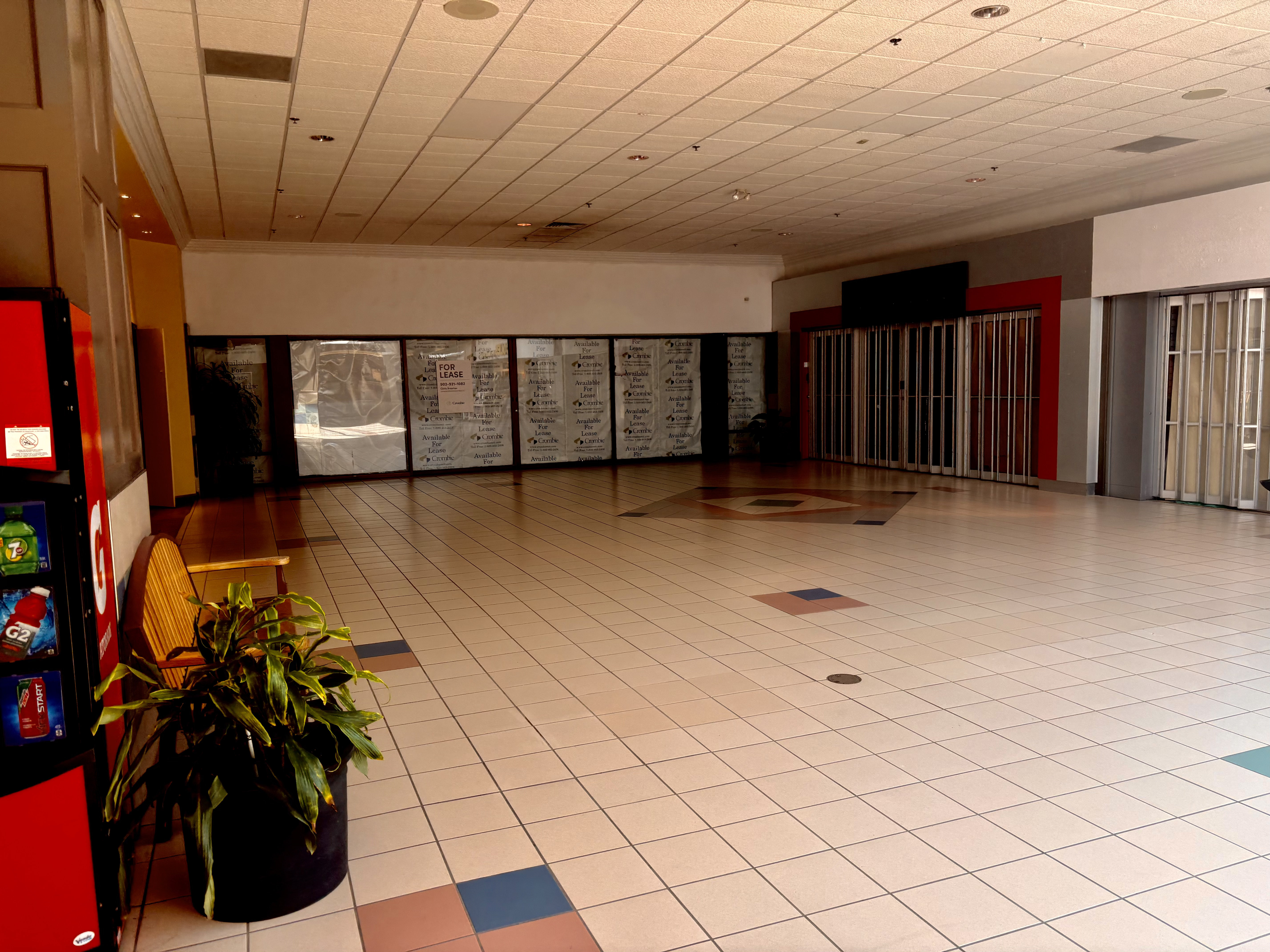
- Interior, August 2026
- Location: New Minas, Nova Scotia, Canada
- Coordinates: 45°3′58.9″N 64°26′35.6″W
- Address: 9256 Commercial Street, New Minas, NS B4N 4A9
- Opened: October 1974
- Renovated: 1988; 1997
- Manager: PMCo.
- Owner: PMCo.
- Floor area: 271,091 sq. ft.
- Floors: 1
- Public transit: Kings Transit
- Website: www.countyfair.ca

County Fair Mall is a shopping mall in New Minas, Nova Scotia, Canada. It is located on Commercial Street, the main big-box shopping area for the Annapolis Valley. Behind the mall, Nova Scotia Highway 101 includes a interchange, connecting to the mall from Granite Drive. It is one of two malls in the region, the other being Greenwood Mall.

== History ==
County Fair Mall opened for business in October 1974. It featured multiple anchor tenants including Dominion, Sears and Zellers County Fair.

Dominion left the Nova Scotian market in 1985 after the chain was purchased by A&P. The space was later occupied by SaveEasy, then Sobeys in the late 1990s.

Zellers left the mall on March 16, 2013, remaining vacant for multiple years. On August 11, 2016, the end section of the store was filled in with Value Village, while the rest of the store remained empty.

Sears shuttered on November 30, 2016, leaving another anchor tenant vacant. The store is still empty as of 2026.

On October 29, 2026, County Fair Mall was sold to Tier Too Properties/PMCo for $5.45 million.

== Tenants ==
There are approximately 52 tenants spaces located in the mall. As of July 2026, only 22 are occupied.

Anchor tenants:

- Canadian Tire - Outparcel (50,000 sq. ft.)
- Sobeys (47,448 sq. ft.)
- Value Village (28,049 sq. ft.)

Notable former tenants:

- Dominion, now Sobeys.
- Great Canadian Dollar Store, now vacant.
- Lawtons Drugs, now vacant.
- SaveEasy, now Sobeys.
- Sears, now vacant.
- Zellers, split between Value Village and vacant space.

== Public transportation ==
The mall is serviced by Kings Transit, who includes a bus stop outside of the main mall entrance.

== See also ==
- List of shopping malls in Canada
