= Alberni Mall =

Shopping mall in Port Alberni, BC, Canada

Coordinates: 49.266°N 124.7881°W

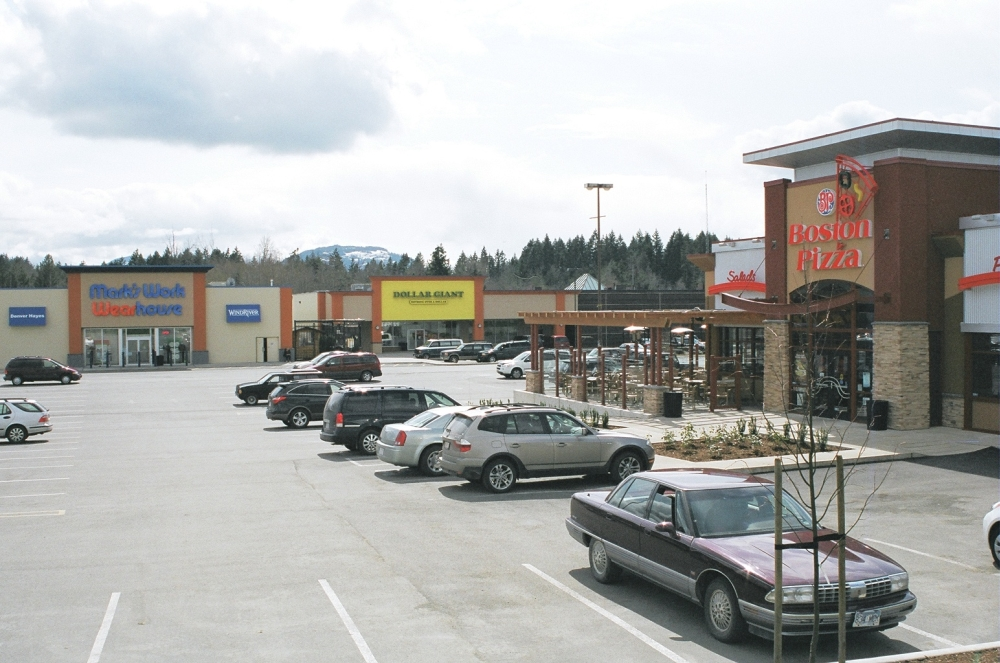
- Location: Port Alberni, British Columbia, Canada
- Opened: May 30, 1979; 47 years ago
- Closed: April 15, 2007 (indoor mall)
- Manager: Canreal Management Corporation
- Owner: Bayfield Realty Advisors Inc.
- Num. of stores: 7
- Num. of anchor tenants: 2
- Floor area: 155,442 sq ft (14,441.0 m^{2}).
- Floors: 1
- Website: Alberni Mall

Alberni Mall is an outdoor shopping mall located in Port Alberni, British Columbia. Formerly an indoor mall until April 15, 2007, major renovation and redevelopment of the former mall complex began in the spring of that year, and it will most likely also be renamed as part of its updating.

== History ==
In 1977, Royal Oak Holdings, a Vancouver-based company which had recently opened the Ironwood Mall in Campbell River, British Columbia, were approached by a group of Port Alberni citizens about building an indoor mall in their city. At the time, Port Alberni was one of the few larger towns in British Columbia that did not have an indoor mall. The proposition received support from then-Port Alberni mayor Jim Robertson, the city's council, the Alberni-Clayoquot Regional District, and major retailers. A twin movie theatre and two banks were included as part of the proposed mall's original plans, but those plans were dropped prior to the beginning of the construction phase.

The mall's site, a then-wooded area located on the southeast corner of Johnston and Cherry Creek Roads, was cleared in summer 1978 and construction began in August that year. The mall was completed and opened for the first time as the Alberni Mall on May 30, 1979, with 42 stores and services, including original anchor tenants Safeway and Kmart while other retailers in the beginning included Fields, Boots Drug Mart, Peoples Jewellers, and Orange Julius.

In later years, Boots (which closed its Canadian stores in the 1980s) was replaced at the mall by People's Drug Mart, and eventually by Pharmasave, while Sears Canada had a dealer store in the late 1980s and the early 1990s.

Alberni Mall prospered through the 1980s and into the mid-1990s, but hard times began to befall the mall beginning in 1996, when Safeway closed its location at the mall on November 14, although they retained their lease; rather than let a competing supermarket chain take over their former space, Safeway opted to sub-lease it to Liquidation World. In 1998, the Canadian stores of Kmart were purchased by the Hudson's Bay Company, with the intent of turning most of them into Zellers stores and closing the rest. One of the stores HBC chose to close was the Alberni Mall Kmart, which was subsequently demolished to make way for a new Canadian Tire, which opened on November 1 that year.

The mall eventually went into further decline with the construction across Johnston Road of a new power centre called the Pacific Rim Shopping Centre, which opened in early 2005 with Wal-Mart and Extra Foods as its anchors, followed by the closure of the Liquidation World store in May 2006 (several months after Safeway's lease on the location expired), which led to a further exodus of retailers. From a high of about 45 stores and services in the 1980s, Alberni Mall approached dead mall status near the end of its function as an indoor mall as its tenant list dropped to just four businesses by the time of its closure—Canadian Tire, The Source, Mark's Work Wearhouse, and Solda's Restaurant, with all other businesses either relocating to the new Pacific Rim Centre or elsewhere in Port Alberni, or closing their doors altogether.

In August 2006, the mall began undergoing complete redevelopment to turn it into a power centre similar to the neighboring Pacific Rim Centre. As part of the overhaul, the site of the old Boots/Pharmasave and Peoples Jewellers locations in the mall’s east end was the first part of the old mall to be torn down to make way for a relocation of Mark’s Work Wearhouse beside Canadian Tire; The front portion of the remainder of the mall between the new Mark’s Work Wearhouse and the former Safeway/Liquidation World was levelled for a parking lot while the back portion will renovated for retail space; and the existing Safeway space at the mall’s west end will be renovated and divided into smaller retail spaces.

On April 15, 2007, the main part of the mall closed to allow demolition and renovations to resume as Mark's Work Wearhouse relocated to its new store (which opened four days earlier, on April 11), while The Source By Circuit City closed temporarily to prepare for a relocation to its new Pacific Rim Centre location (which opened in early July) and Solda’s also temporarily closed while its owners prepared a new location for the restaurant. The first two new tenants for the mall as part of its revitalization arrived in late 2007 when the dollar store chain Dollar Giant opened for business in November, followed by Boston Pizza on December 28. Redevelopment of the old mall was expected to continue into 2008, but further renovations were subsequently put on hold due to pending interest from other prospective new tenants and the recent economic downturn.

On July 2, 2010, the Boston Pizza location at Alberni Mall was forced to close by mall owner Shape Properties as the result of the previous franchise owner falling behind on rent payments, which added up to a backlog of $106,000 at the time of closure. The Alberni Mall Boston Pizza franchise has since been acquired by new owners, who reopened the restaurant on April 30, 2011. Shape Properties also announced plans to subdivide the remaining part of the old mall into smaller parcels for sale to interested clients, including the possibility of a new multiplex movie theatre (which had been part of the mall's original plans in a previous form).

On May 10, 2012, local Home Hardware franchise owner Jon Lavertu announced that he had made a deal with Shape Properties to relocate his Home Hardware store to Alberni Mall. As part of the relocation, the former Safeway space at the mall was renovated, with a new outside entrance for the store included in the renovations. With the relocation and the expanded floor space, the Home Hardware store was rebranded and reformatted as a Home Hardware Building Centre and opened on November 29, 2012. Another new retailer, Aaron's Furniture, opened at the mall on December 1, 2012. On July 10, 2012, Shape Properties also announced that a new store, Paws 'n Jaws Pet Shop, was to open at the mall in the fall of 2012 while furniture retail chain The Brick would also be relocating its Port Alberni location to the mall in the spring of 2013, with complete redevelopment of the mall expected to be done by midyear. The Brick opened its new Alberni Mall location on May 2, 2013. On October 24, 2013, it was announced that an investment syndicate headed by Bayfield Realty Advisors Inc. had purchased the mall from Shape Properties on October 16, with Vancouver-based Canreal Management Corporation taking over the mall's management.

== See also ==
- List of shopping malls in Canada
