= List of shopping centres in Greater Longueuil =

This is a list of shopping centres in the urban agglomeration of Longueuil, in the Montérégie region of Quebec.

== Boucherville ==
=== Carrefour de la Rive-Sud ===
Carrefour de la Rive-Sud is a power centre inaugurated in 2003 in Boucherville, Quebec at the corner of highways 20 and 30. It is 312,229 sq ft (29,007.0 m^{2}) and managed by Centrecorp of Markham, Ontario.

The major tenants are IKEA, Costco, Rona le Rénovateur, Super C, Winners, Homesense, Marshalls, Bureau en Gros, Deco Decouverte, and Linen Chest. Other tenants include Sports Experts, Tommy Hilfiger, Bouclair, L'Equipeur and Archambault. Among popular boutiques, there is Reitmans, BCBG Maxazria, Aldo and Garage. Although Carrefour de la Rive-Sud does occupy a large territory, its number of tenants is no more than 60.

Carrefour de la Rive Sud houses one of the three Adidas warehouse stores in Quebec that sells the Adidas Performance collection, Adidas' sub-brand which specializes in sport clothes and running shoes.

With Quartier DIX30 in Brossard, Carrefour de la Rive Sud represent the major unenclosed malls of Greater Longueuil, although smaller power centers can be found in the cities of Longueuil and Saint-Bruno.

=== Promenades Montarville ===
Promenades Montarville is one of the smallest indoor malls in Greater Longueuil. It is situated at the corner of de Montarville and de Mortagne boulevards in the city of Boucherville.

The majors tenants are Provigo, Canadian Tire, Go Sport and Jean Coutu. Many of the tenants are small business, but the mall also has a number of retailing chains such as Dollarama, La Source, Greiche & Scaff, Ardène, Le Naturiste and Panda. The bank in the mall is Banque de Montreal (BMO) and its restaurants are Tim Hortons and Subway.

It was opened on October 24, 1979, by Provigo, developed at the cost of $6 million. It inaugurated with 37 stores and was the first shopping centre to be wholly owned by Provigo. The anchors were Provigain and Canadian Tire. There was also a Sears catalogue centre and a SAQ.

Promenades Montarville is less than 5 km (3.1 mi) away from the much larger (but not enclosed) Carrefour de le Rive-Sud.

== Brossard ==
=== Place Portobello ===
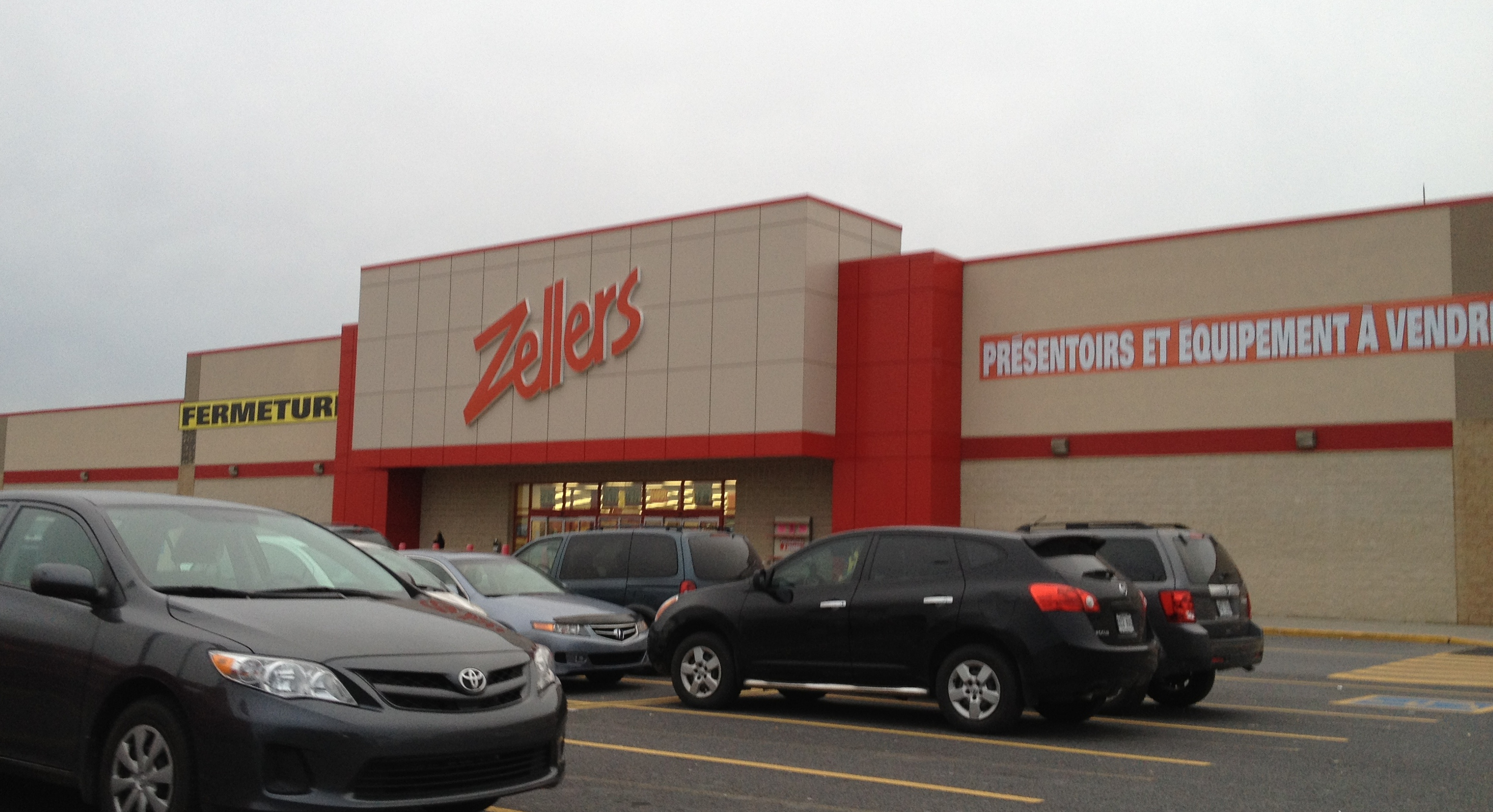
Former Zellers at Place Portobello, one of the largest stores in the province for this retailer

Place Portobello is a shopping mall located in Brossard, Quebec along Taschereau Boulevard near the Autoroute 10-Taschereau Interchange. It has 504,000 sq ft (46,800 m^{2}) of gross leasable on a land of 40 acres (16 ha). There is a building in the middle of the mall with second and third floors serving as commercial office spaces. Major tenants include Linen Chest, Maxi and Jean Coutu. A nearby Réno-Dépot hardware store is a tenant of Place Portobello, despite not sharing any indoor or outdoor boundary with the rest of the mall. Since March 2011, Place Portobello has been operated by First Capital Realty. It was previously operated by Cogir Management Corporation. Although it no longer owns or manages the mall, Cogir still has its offices in the building of Place Portobello.

It was opened on September 21, 1966, with Woolco, Dominion and 20 stores. It expanded with the opening of new anchor Beaver Lumber on May 1, 1974. It expanded again a year later with the addition of new stores to reach 75 tenants in May 1975.

Dominion became Provigo on June 22, 1981.

Following the acquisition of the eight Quebec Beaver Lumber locations by Groupe Val Royal Ltd, the Portobello store closed on December 24, 1987, was given a facelift and reopened in early February 1988 as a Brico Centre outlet.

In 1991, Provigo rebranded to Maxi. It was the second supermarket to carry the Maxi banner in Greater Longueuil after that retailer's first location opened in 1984 in Longueuil proper.

Walmart bought the Woolco stores in 1994. The Woolco sign that hung for 27 years at the Place Portobello store came down on March 1, 1994, and was replaced by Walmart's. The latter was replaced by Zellers from December 2008 to December 2012. The Zellers was renovated and converted into a Target store, which opened its doors to the public on September 17, 2013, which later closed in 2015. The former Target is now subdivided between a Renaissance thrift store, a Buffet des Continents buffet restaurant, a Surplus RD furniture outlet, a Party Mania location, a Canada Computers shop and a World Gym fitness center.

== Longueuil ==
=== Greenfield Park ===
==== Complexe 5mille ====
Complexe 5mille is a shopping centre located in the borough of Greenfield Park, Quebec, Canada located on 5000 T Taschereau Boulevard, near Greenfield Park's borough limit with neighbouring Brossard. It inaugurated around the same time as its original tenant Super Carnaval which opened on January 23, 1985. From the late 1980s and up until 2010, the mall was called Mail Carnaval and was named after Super Carnaval (today Super C).

Mail Carnaval was once an indoor shopping centre. A Jean Coutu pharmacy was one of the first tenants in the 1980s, but soon moved out. Tenants that once made business at Mail Carnaval include a Famous Players movie theatre, the National Bank of Canada and a Zellers department store.

As of 2002, Mail Carnaval gradually began losing its small tenants and was on its way to become a dead mall. In the summer of 2007, the last small tenants left the mall. The mall's indoor corridor was demolished in 2009. Shortly after Zellers closed in May 2010, the name of the mall was changed from Mail Carnaval to 5000 Taschereau Boulevard; it has since been rechristened to Complexe 5mille. As of 2024, only Super C, Éconofitness, Michaels, and relocated L'Équipeur and Winners stores from nearby Place Greenfield Park are in operation. Due to the demolition of the indoor mall section in 2009, Super C's building is physically separated from the rest of the tenants.

==== Galeries Taschereau ====
Galeries Taschereau is a strip mall that was an enclosed mall until 2002. Previously managed by Cambridge Leaseholds, it is now operated by Sandalwood Management. The mall served as the city council of the city of Greenfield Park until the late 1990s.

The major tenants are Fruiterie 440, Hart, L'Aubainerie, Marché du Store, and warehouses of both Pennington and Taylor. Joining them are two restaurants (Amir and Subway), a Buzzfit Gym, and a few smaller enterprises including a hairdresser (P&J Coiffure), a cellphone repair enterprise (UBreakIFix), and a marijuana market selling pot-culture paraphernalia.

Galeries Taschereau was anchored at its opening in late 1973 by A&P Canada, Greenberg and Horizon. In early 1979, Eaton's changed the vocation of the Horizon location by turning it into a Foyerama furniture store. An expansion in 1983 increased the size of the mall to 220,000 sq ft (20,000 m^{2}) and tripled its number of tenants to 60 anchors and shops including a new Zellers store which replaced the Eaton's (Foyerama) store. It was a significantly smaller than contemporary Zellers stores and it closed around 1987. Hart, Le Château warehouse occupy and a recently vacated Village des Valeurs occupy the space where this Zellers stood. It had no connection to the Zellers store that later opened in 1990 at Mail Carnaval.

In February 2020, Village des Valeurs left its location at Galeries Tachereau it had occupied since 1991, to relocate to other side the street on Auguste Avenue. Other past tenants include Provigo (which replaced A&P in 1984 and is now the Fruiterie 440), Future Shop, Bouclair and Bank of Montreal.

==== Place Greenfield Park ====
Place Greenfield Park (also called Riocan Greenfield Park) is a large strip mall located in Greenfield Park, Quebec. It is located on Taschereau Boulevard, extending from Gladstone Street to Margaret Street. It is owned and operated by RioCan.

Place Greenfield Park inaugurated on August 26, 1965 with 25 stores such as Reitmans and Laura Secord. It had for anchors Steinberg's, Miracle Mart and Pascal's, all of which were already operational before the rest of Place Greenfield Park opened. Built as an indoor mall in 1965, Place Greenfield was the first enclosed shopping centre in the South Shore of Montreal but was converted to the strip format in 2001. For some 40 years, the shopping centre was under the management of Ivanhoe Corporation (today Ivanhoé Cambridge). In September 2002, Ivanhoé Cambridge sold the mall to RioCan.

Toyville, a large-sized toy retailer, inaugurated on October 22, 1981. The store was located on the end side of the shopping center that intersects Gladstone Avenue. Its space was later occupied by a Club Biz office supply store from October 29, 1992, until that chain filed for bankruptcy protection and closed in early 1996. Like the rest of Club Biz locations, the lease was acquired by Bureau en Gros which inaugurated its store on June 1, 1996, a few days after opening its door to the public.

Leon's opened a store on January 7, 1988. It essentially replaced the Miracle Mart store that had closed in 1986. In October 2007, Leon's left its location in the mall and moved to the intersection of Chambly Road and Autoroute 30 in the St-Hubert borough of Longueuil. After being for much of the 2010s either a Ha Bay furniture store or a Le Grand Marché Rive-Sud flea market, the space was subdivided in 2017 by Jysk, Univers Kids Dépôt and a portion of Giant Tiger. Jysk opened on June 3, 2017.

Pascal's at Place Greenfield Park closed in late July 1991, outliving by a few weeks most of the chain's other locations. Along with the stores at Place Versailles and Quebec City, it was one of the three final Pascal's locations to close which concluded the history of the 87-year-old hardware chain. Goineau-Bousquet, a hardware retailer from Laval announced in late 1991 that it would set up a 100,000 sq ft (9,300 m^{2}) store in the former Pascal's site in Greenfield Park. Goineau-Bousquet filed for bankruptcy protection on June 3, 1996, and, in the process, announced the closing of its Greenfield Park location, effective for the end of July. On October 22, 1998, Cinémas Guzzo opened biggest movie theater in the country combined with a recreational mix of arcade games, bumper cars and a carousel.

In mid-1992, the Steinberg grocery store rebranded as Provigo which in turn was converted to Maxi within the year.

Winners opened a store of 25,000 sq ft (2,300 m^{2}) on August 17, 1995. It replaced the majority of the Wise store which had closed only months before. Wise had been with Place Greenfield Park since the shopping centre's debut in 1965, originating as a small tenant in the mall, and later relocating as an anchor store at 391 Taschereau (Note: today 3390 Taschereau) since at least the year 1990. Winners left Place Greenfield Park around 2019-2020.

In early August 1980, Calgary-based Mark's Work Wearhouse entered the Montreal market under the name La Ouerasse with the opening of four stores including one at Place Greenfield Park near the corner of Gladstone Avenue. La Ouerasse switched name to L'Équipeur in 1990. L'Équipeur expanded in September 1996 as a store of 15,000 sq ft (1,400 m^{2}) of floor space in the same shopping centre, becoming the chain's largest location in Quebec. L'Équipeur left Place Greenfield Park around 2016 and has been replaced by a relocated Dollarama. This is not the first time Dollarama is occupying a former premise of L'Équipeur in this shopping centre. Dollarama's previous location (which is now much of the Giant Tiger store) was where used to be L'Équipeur prior to its relocation in 1996.

=== Saint-Hubert ===
==== Carrefour St-Hubert ====
Carrefour St-Hubert is a strip mall located at the intersection of Cousineau Blvd and Gaetan-Boucher Blvd. It is owned by First Capital REIT. The major tenants are Super C, Jean Coutu, Dollarama, CIBC, McDonald's and SAQ Sélection.

The mall's tenants were initially connected to one building, with the exception of a small building that held Quiznos Subs and SAQ Express. From the late 2000s to mid-2010s, various renovations has been made to the mall that brought up a new large building housing new and relocated tenants such as Dollarama, RE/MAX and selected social services. As well various outside buildings such as a large one housing Super C, replacing Maxi (previously Provigo) from the old structure as the mall's supermarket, one for the relocated SAQ Express, which got converted into the larger SAQ Sélection, one for McDonald's, taking over the former Quiznos and SAQ leases, and two small buildings housing smaller tenants, including a relocated Quiznos. Despite also being renovated, Jean Coutu and Nettoyeur Champlain remain the only tenants to not be relocated within the mall. CIBC, which was physically detached from the large building following the demolition of the former Dollarama lease, retained the old building's structure until it got demolished and the bank then relocated to a new building next to Super C.

==== Centre Cousineau ====
Centre Cousineau (also called Centre Cousineau Point-Zero since 2010) is located at the intersection of Cousineau Blvd and Montée Saint-Hubert. It is managed and owned by Enterprises Point-Zéro, a company best known for its clothing lineup Point-Zéro. The major anchor tenants are Jean Coutu and Metro Plus. From 1997 to 2010, the mall housed the public library of Saint-Hubert.

Centre Cousineau has its origins in the 1960s as a nameless strip mall that corresponds today to the section of the mall that faces Montée Saint-Hubert. In 1978, the strip mall was converted into the current indoor mall. It was first named Galeries Cousineau in 1978, then renamed Complexe Cousineau in 1987, and finally Centre Cousineau in 2006.

The mall was at its peak in the 1980s, with a total of 75 stores including anchors Rona, Greenberg, Sports Experts, Croteau, Jean Coutu and Metro. Its office building was home to a CLSC and many Saint-Hubert municipal services.

Centre Cousineau began to lose ground in the 1990s. By the mid-2000s, it had all but been turned into a dead mall, with retailing chains such as La Source, Société des alcools du Québec and Petland having closed in addition to the many small businesses. To add to the injury, a fire in 2007 destroyed La Crémière, a fast food and ice cream store, and the Jean-Coutu pharmacy, causing the permanent closure of the former and relocation of the latter. Lack of proper insurance coverage caused the mall to be partially barricaded for a number of years without renovation.

In 2009, Entreprises Point-Zéro acquired Centre Cousineau. It made significant improvements to the anchor stores, including renovating extensively their exterior facades. The rest of the centre however continued to be deserted. As of late September 2018, the few indoors tenants that were left relocated to the outdoor section on Montée Saint-Hubert. The mall's doors have all been permanently locked with the lights turned off. Only its two anchor stores on Cousineau Blvd. and a handful of small tenants on the strip mall section facing Montée Saint-Hubert survive.

==== Plaza Actuel ====
Plaza Actuel is a strip mall located at the intersection of Cousineau Blvd and Gaetan-Boucher Blvd. It is owned by First Capital REIT. The major tenants are Énergie Cardio, Bell, TD Canada Trust, RBC Banque Royale, St-Hubert and Le Grenier. The mall was initially composed of only the eastern building, along with St-Hubert and Pizza Hut (unrelated to the nearby delivery-only chain at Chemin de Chambly). The western building was occupied by a General Motors car dealership, which closed in 2009, and then used as a temporary site of for the 2009 swine flu pandemic vaccine. In 2010, small tenants, as well as Bell and Énergie Cardio, both moving from smaller strip malls, start occuping the newly renovated lease of the former car dealership. Pizza Hut close its door and its building then got demolished to build to two small buildings next to each other, housing TD and RBC respectively.

==== Les Promenades du Parc ====
Les Promenades du Parc is a strip mall located at the intersection of Cousineau Blvd and Gaetan-Boucher Blvd. It is owned by First Capital REIT. The major tenants are IGA Extra, Pharmaprix, Banque Nationale du Canada, Chico, Vidéotron and Tim Hortons.

Canadian Tire was one of the former tenants of the mall. When the mall store closed, IGA, then located at where Pharmaprix and two small tenants are today, took over the lease and converted into IGA Extra.

=== Le Vieux-Longueuil ===
==== Centre Jacques-Cartier ====
Centre Jacques-Cartier is a small shopping mall located in Le Vieux-Longueuil borough of Longueuil, Quebec. The mall is made of approximately 45 stores occupying 212,930 sq ft (19,782 m^{2}) of rentable space. It is located at the intersection of Chambly Road and Ste-Foy Boulevard

Its original anchors in 1957 were Steinberg's, Wise, Woolworth's and United Stores. These companies are gone today but their anchor spaces have remained more or less the same and are currently occupied respectively by IGA, Rossy, Dollarama and Village des Valeurs. Other current major tenants include Cinémas Guzzo and Pharmaprix. Major tenants of the past include Hart, Bouclair and Consumers Distributing.

The mall is named after Ville Jacques-Cartier which was the name of the city at the time the shopping centre was constructed. Like other early shopping centres in Quebec, it was developed by Ivanhoe. Successor Ivanhoé Cambridge owned the mall until September 2002. After this, the mall was managed by RioCan which co-owned it with another company . It is now owned and operated by Toronto-based Strathallen Capital.

==== Place Desormeaux ====
Place Desormeaux is a shopping mall located in Longueuil, Quebec, Canada at the corner of Chambly Road and Desormeaux Blvd. Its major tenants are Super C and Walmart. The mall is made of approximately 45 stores occupying 240,000 sq ft (22,000 m^{2}) of rentable space. The mall has two banks: Bank of Montreal and National Bank of Canada.

The mall officially inaugurated on May 25, 1971 though its stores had gradually began opening their doors since May 19. It opened with 50 commerces and two large department stores, Zellers and Bonimart, each occupying an area of 100,000 sq ft (9,300 m^{2}). The shopping mall as a whole was 300,000 sq ft (28,000 m^{2}) and was owned by Marcel Adams. At its opening, Place Desormeaux was the largest mall in the South Shore as well as the fourth in the Montreal area after Fairview Pointe-Claire, Galeries d'Anjou and Place Versailles. Tenants in the 1970s included Steinberg's, the Bank of Montreal, Banque Canadienne Nationale, Reitmans, J B Lefebvre and Laura Secord Chocolates.

Place Desormeaux began a six-month renovation which was completed on October 29, 1986. A notable consequence of this renovation was the reduction of the size of the Bonimart store whose remaining anchor space was converted into a mall section for 20 new stores. This increased Place Desormeaux's number of tenants to 70 but the total area size of the shopping mall remained unchanged because the expansion was strictly limited indoor within the Bonimart space.

In April 1991, Zellers announced the rebranding into its nameplate of 46 Towers/Bonimart stores. Since there was already a Zellers store in the mall, the Bonimart at Place Desormeaux was closed. Its closing greatly decreased consumer traffic in the part of the mall it was located to the point that by the mid-1990s there was not a single store left around where used to be Bonimart. In 1997, this section of the shopping mall was torn down and completely rebuilt to welcome the current Super C on May 1, 1998.

The Steinberg grocery chain went bankrupt in 1992. Unlike most Steinberg locations, the one at Place Desormeaux was not sold and was closed outright instead. A small grocery chain Esposito took over the lease. Esposito in turn closed in 1996, opening the way for department store Winners to install itself in the mall on August 22, 1996. After operating for some 10 years, Winners closed around late 2006/early 2007. The space is now home to a branch of the SAAQ and the Longueuil Local Employment Centre, both of which are part of the Government of Quebec.

After 40 years in operation, Zellers permanently closed its doors in June 2012. Walmart assumed the lease of the former Zellers store and opened its store in October of the same year.

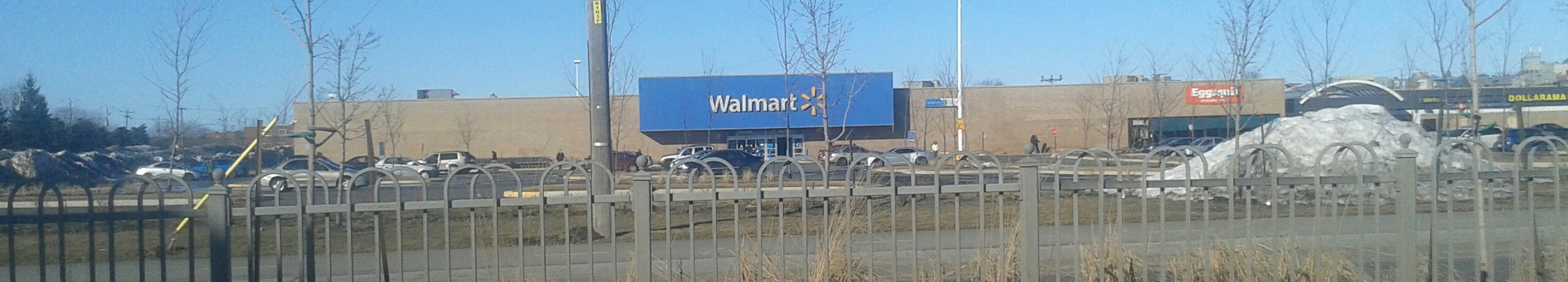
Walmart at Place Desormeaux

==== Place Longueuil ====
Place Longueuil
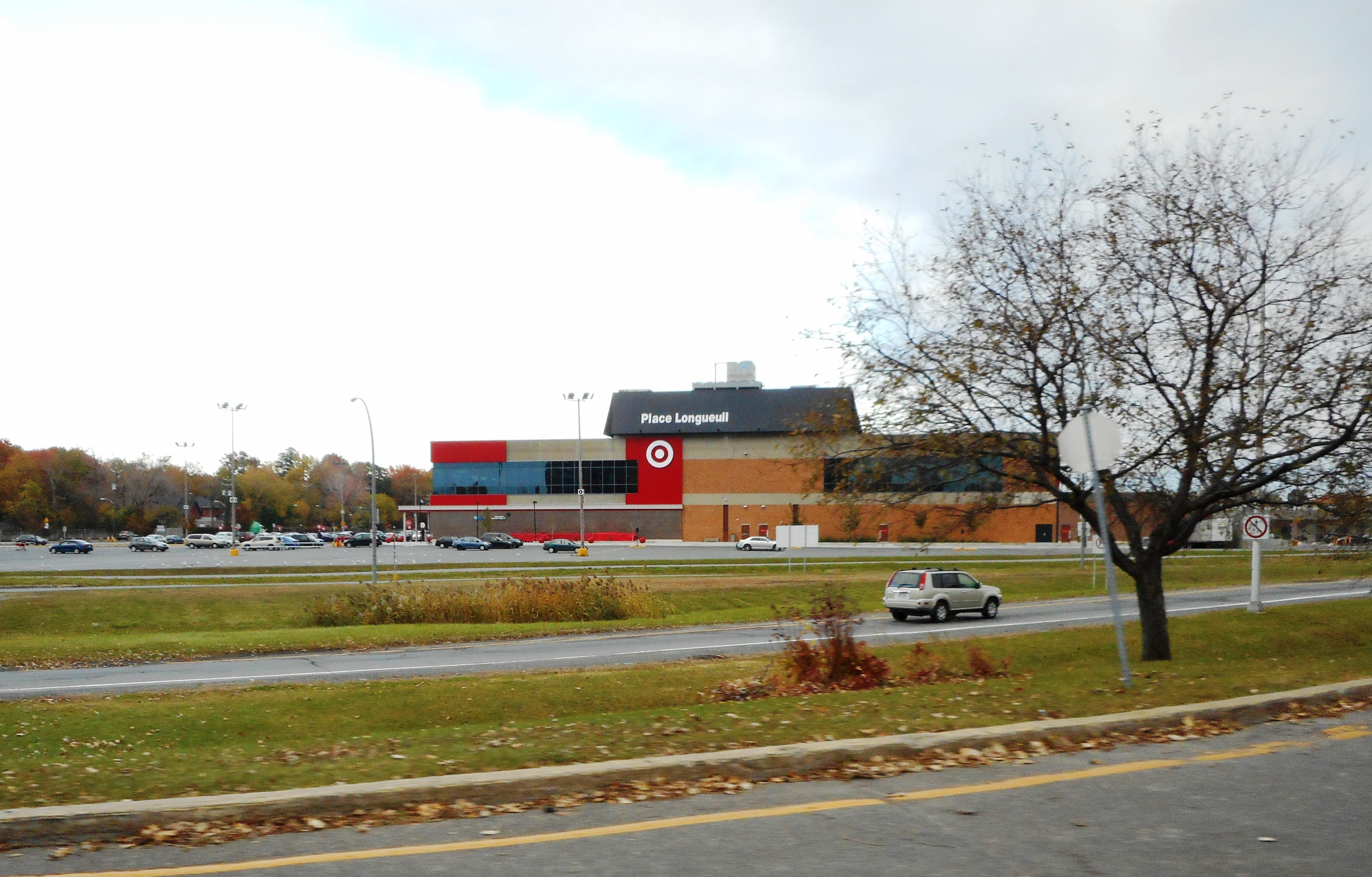
- Place Longueuil, from Saint-Charles Street
- Address: 825, rue Saint-Laurent Ouest; Longueuil, Quebec; J4K 2V1
- Opened: November 2, 1966
- Manager: Groupe Mach
- Owner: Groupe Mach
- Num. of stores: 140
- Num. of anchor tenants: 2
- Floor area: 397,600 sq ft (36,940 m^{2}) (rentable space)
- Floors: 1
- Parking: Outdoor
- Public transit: Longueuil–Université-de-Sherbrooke station Terminus Longueuil
- Website: placelongueuil.com

Place Longueuil is a shopping mall located in Longueuil, Quebec, Canada. The major stores are IGA Extra, Winners/HomeSense and, to a lesser extent, St-Hubert and Sports Experts.

Place Longueuil opened on November 2, 1966. It inaugurated with 50 stores including Steinberg, Miracle Mart, Royal Bank of Canada and Birks.

Place Longueuil and its 60 shops were destroyed on October 6, 1979, by a major fire. The damage was estimated at 15 million $ and more than 20,000 people watched the shopping mall burned. It took five fire departments to extinguish the blaze and three firemen were briefly injured. Unlike the shops, Steinberg's and Miracle Mart were spared due to the presence of fire sprinkler systems in their stores.

The mall was rebuilt and reopened on April 8, 1981, with 90 stores.

Miracle Mart was renamed M in 1986 and the chain finally went under in 1992. After M closed, Zellers took the location of M and remained there until its own closure in 2012 and its subsequent replacement by Target the following year.

In February 2011, it was announced that Homburg Canada would succeed over Cogir as manager of Place Longueuil. The transaction took effect a couple of days later. As of 2017, Place Longueuil was owned and operated by Cominar. In early 2022, Groupe Mach acquired 25% of Cominar's portfolio including Place Longueuil.

== Saint-Lambert ==
=== Carré Saint-Lambert ===
Carré Saint-Lambert is a small strip mall located on Sir Wilfrid Laurier Boulevard near Victoria Avenue in St. Lambert, Quebec, Canada. The property is owned and operated by SGI Properties, a Quebec-based real estate company. Built in 1958, it is located just off the Victoria Bridge and near the Lemoyne neighbourhood of Longueuil.

Its major tenants include IGA, Familiprix, Le SuperClub Vidéotron, Société des alcools du Québec.

Former tenants include headquarters of the Riverside School Board.

== See also ==
- List of malls in Montreal
- List of small shopping centres in Montreal
