= Woody the Talking Christmas Tree =

Animatronic Christmas tree in Nova Scotia

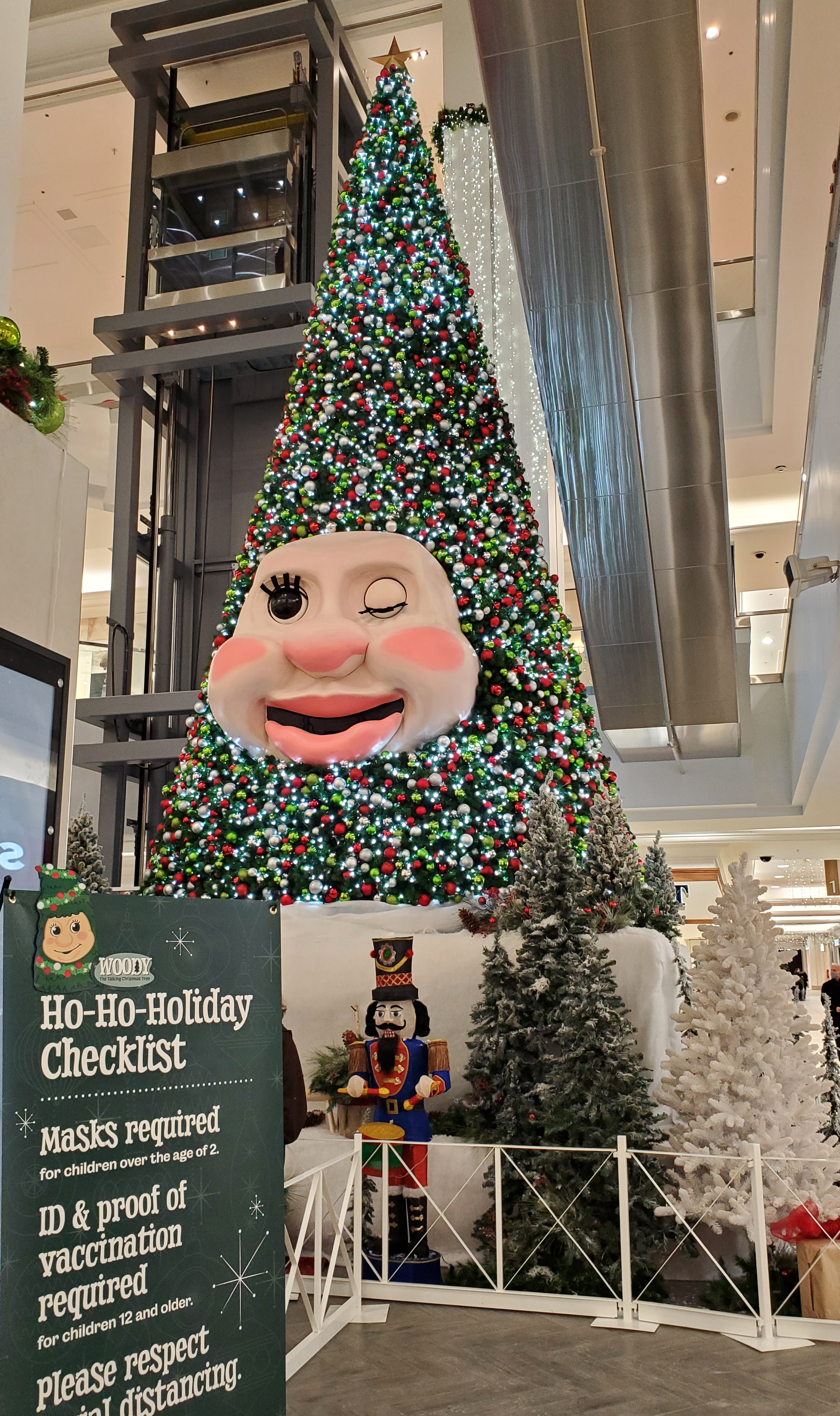
- Location: Mic Mac Mall, Dartmouth, Nova Scotia, Canada
- Height: 15–17 m (50–56 ft)

Woody the Talking Christmas Tree is a large animatronic Christmas tree and holiday attraction installed annually at Mic Mac Mall in the Dartmouth area of Halifax, Nova Scotia, Canada. Woody stands approximately 15 to 17 metres (50 to 56 feet) tall.

== History ==
Woody the Talking Christmas Tree debuted at Mic Mac Mall in 1983. Woody operated every holiday season until its retirement after Christmas 2006 due to structural deterioration of its frame and safety concerns. In September 2021, Joe Ramia bought Mic Mac Mall and promised Woody's return as part of the acquisition. "Woody 3.0" was unveiled in November 2021, featuring a new 3D-printed face and electric controls.

The 2021 revival went viral on social media and earned mentions on Jimmy Fallon's The Tonight Show Starring Jimmy Fallon and international media outlets like CNN.
