= The Hub Shopping Centre =

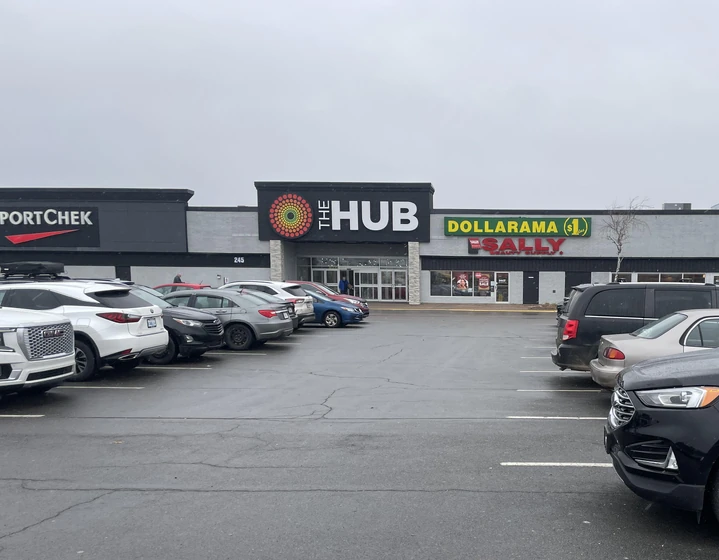
- Mall entrance, 2024
- Location: Truro, Nova Scotia, Canada
- Coordinates: 45°22′11″N 63°18′12″W
- Address: 245 Robie Street, Truro, NS B2N 5N6
- Opened: August 1975
- Developer: The Rocca Group
- Owner: The Gray Group Inc.
- Num. of stores: 56
- Num. of anchor tenants: 5
- Floor area: 239,571 sq. ft.
- Website: trurohub.ca

The Hub Shopping Centre (formerly Truro Mall) is a 239,571 sq. ft. shopping mall in Truro, Nova Scotia, Canada. It is located on Robie Street, one of the main arterials in the community. Nova Scotia Highway 102 also runs nearby the mall.

== History ==
Truro Mall opened in August 1975 with two primary anchor tenants, Dominion and Kmart. Other notable tenants included Bargain Harold's and Marks & Spencer (later Peoples).

A new wing was constructed in 1989, adding Sears as a new anchor tenant. The rest of the mall was renovated, also adding a food court. A grand re-opening was held on June 29, including Miss Canada 1989 Juliette Powell and Terry Kelly at the celebration.

Kmart was converted to Zellers in 1998. It closed on March 17, 2013, not being converted to Target. The store was later split up into Michaels, PetSmart, Rossy and Winners.

Sears closed in October 2017, after a round of multiple closures was announced in June of that year.

In 2021, ownership was changed to RCS Construction and PMCo. In June of that year, Home Hardware took over the former Sears store. In 2022, Truro Mall was rebranded to The Hub Shopping Centre, along with this, the food court was redone, including a new outdoor seating area.

== See also ==
- List of shopping malls in Canada
