= Port Place Shopping Centre =

- Location: Nanaimo, British Columbia, Canada
- Coordinates: 49.1648°N 123.9332°W
- Opened: 1952 (original strip mall); 1967 (indoor mall, as Harbour Park)
- Manager: Anthem Properties
- Owner: Anthem Properties
- Num. of stores: 25
- Num. of anchor tenants: 2
- Floor area: 134,478 sq ft (12,493.4 m^{2})
- Floors: 2
- Parking: 800

Port Place Shopping Centre is a hybrid indoor/outdoor shopping mall located in Nanaimo, British Columbia, Canada. It previously had a total retail floor area of 145,000 square feet prior to partial demolition of the mall space, which reduced its floor space to approximately 134,478 square feet prior to the addition of new retail and office space.

== History ==
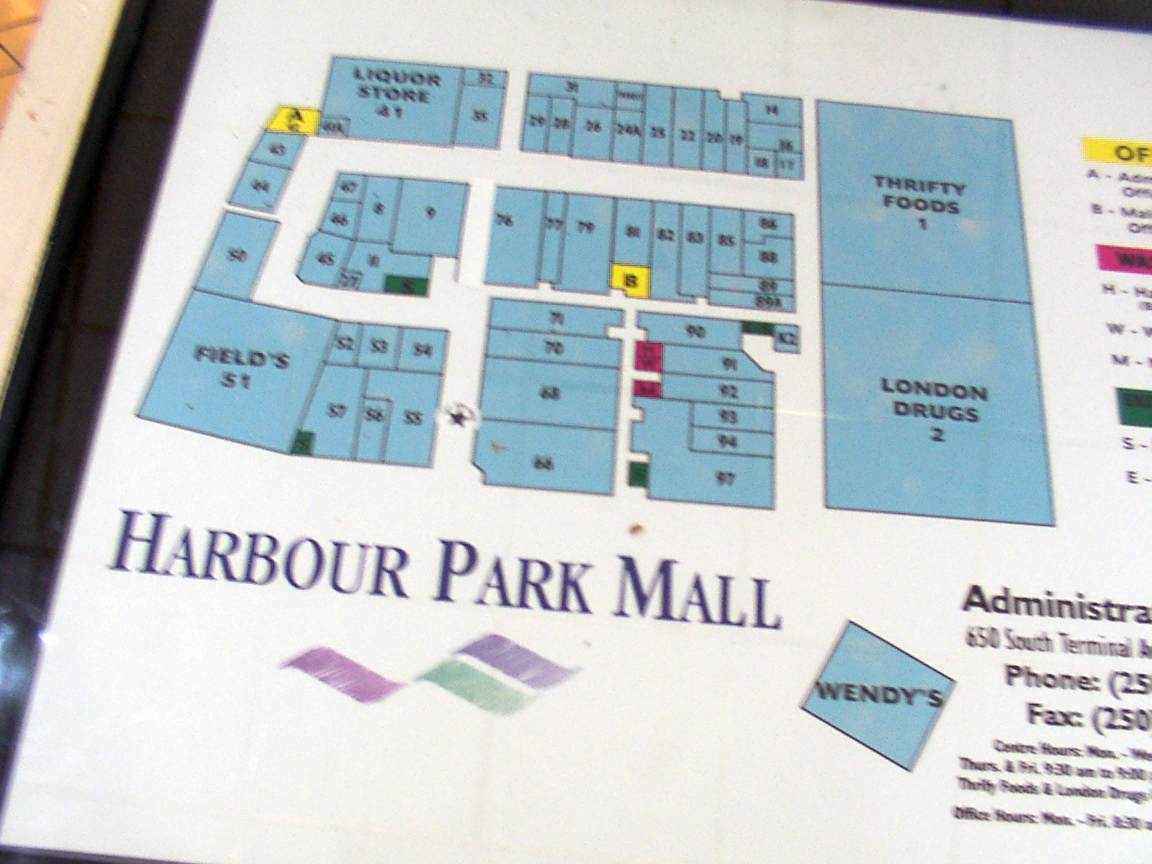
A map of Harbour Park mall prior to renovations

Port Place began as a two-store strip mall that was built in 1952 on the site of the former Nanaimo Sports Grounds in the downtown area, with Simpsons-Sears and Safeway as the original anchor tenants.

The facility was expanded in 1967 by attaching an indoor mall (the second one in Nanaimo, after Northbrook Mall), which was then named Harbour Park Mall. Safeway moved into a larger location in the newly added mall portion, while Fields opened in the former Safeway space and Cunningham Drug (which was bought out by Shoppers Drug Mart in 1971) joined the tenant list.

Harbour Park underwent expansion again in the early 1980s with the construction of more retail space. In the following years, Safeway and Shoppers Drug Mart closed their locations at the mall and Sears was relocated to Rutherford Mall in north Nanaimo. Thrifty Foods took over as the supermarket anchor in 1988, London Drugs opened a location next to Thrifty Foods, and after a period of use as a bingo hall, the former Sears space was divided and renovated to accommodate Liquidation World, a fitness gym, and other retail spaces.

In 1997, Liquidation World and most of the other businesses in the old Sears location were forced to vacate their spaces to allow the Great Canadian Casino to move in. The only business that was not forced to move was Subway, which had a long-term lease at its then-location.

Plans for renovation and refurbishment of Harbour Park by its owners were begun in 2000, most notably the demolition of several former retail spaces near Fields to make way for a food court. After a lengthy delay in renovating that part of the mall, the renovations were finished and the food court opened in 2004. That same year, the mall name was changed to the present Port Place upon completion of the mall renovation project.

In a 2009 recent announcement, Port Place owner First Capital Corp. revealed plans to redevelop much of the present Port Place site. In those plans, London Drugs and Thrifty Foods remained at their present locations, while the BC Liquor Store and the Medical Arts Centre moved to new locations across from the two anchor stores, CIBC and Subway moved to new locations in the London Drugs/Thrifty Foods block, and the remaining stores closed and others moved elsewhere in Nanaimo.

Beginning in early 2010, much of the former indoor part of the mall between the London Drugs/Thrifty Foods block, including the food court and the Safeway/Fields space, was demolished to make way for redevelopment of the complex, including a strip mall and freestanding retail space, low-rise office and residential space and a 26-storey condominium tower as part of the redevelopment, which has been estimated will take up to ten years to complete. Phase Two of the new Port Place development, a two-story retail/office hybrid, was completed in fall 2013.

== Anchor tenants ==
- London Drugs
- Thrifty Foods

== Former anchor tenants ==
- Safeway 1952-1986 closed and was replaced with Thrifty Foods
- Simpsons-Sears / Sears Canada 1952-1990
- Fields 1967-2010
- Cunningham Drug 1967-1971
- Shoppers Drug Mart 1971-1987 closed and was replaced with London Drugs
- Liquidation World 1991-1996
- Canada Post 2004-2010
