= Highfield Square =

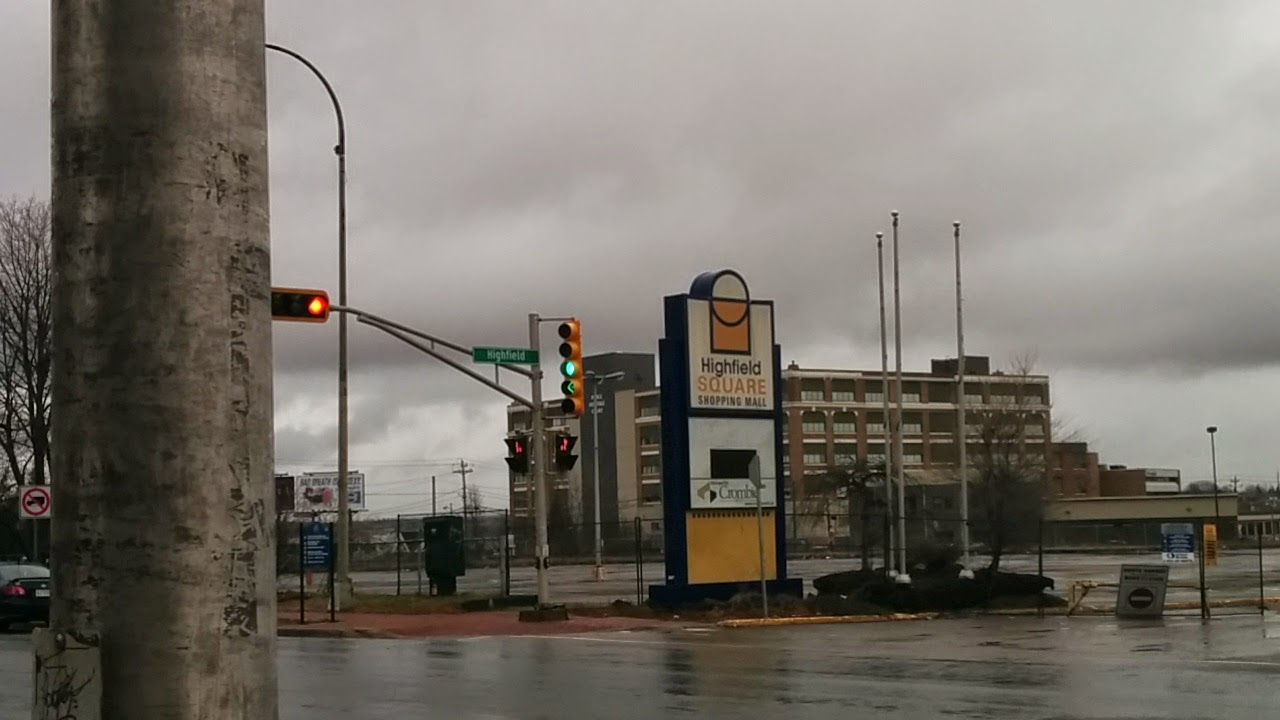
- Highfield Square sign and parking lot
- Location: Moncton, New Brunswick, Canada
- Coordinates: 46.086296°N 64.784817°W
- Opened: 1967
- Closed: 2013
- Demolished: 2014
- Owner: originally Crombie REIT, now City of Moncton
- Num. of stores: 60
- Num. of anchor tenants: 3
- Floors: 2

Highfield Square, also known as Highfield Square Shopping Centre, was an enclosed shopping mall located in Moncton, New Brunswick, Canada. Highfield Square was owned and operated by Crombie REIT before being sold to the city of Moncton. Demolition began in August 2014.

== Aftermath ==
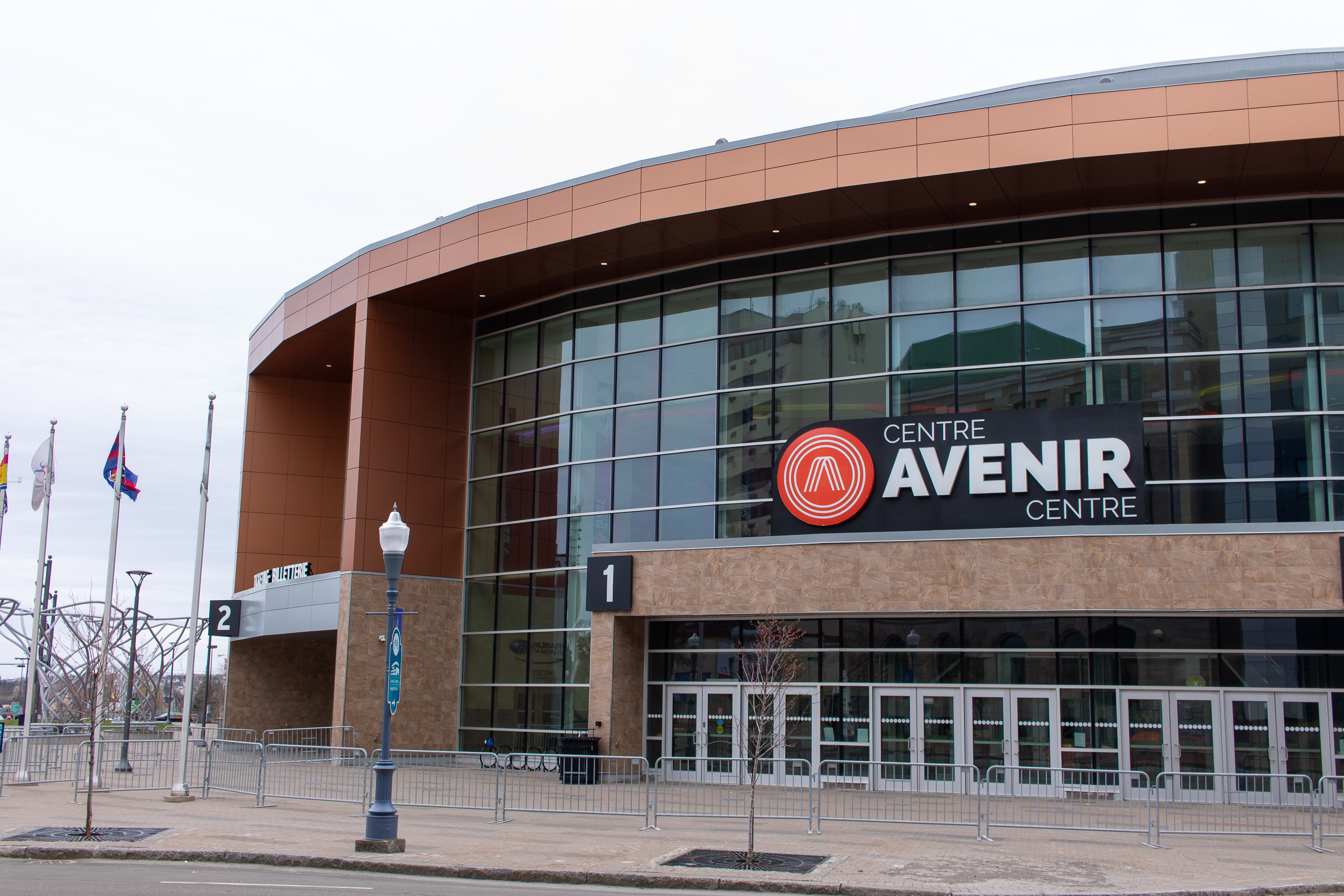
The Avenir Centre was built after the demolition of Highfield Square.

The property has been converted to the Avenir Centre.

== History ==
The mall contained at its peak over 60 stores and services. The major anchor during its lifetime included:

- Hudson's Bay, previously Eatons
- Sobeys
- The Met
- Shoppers Drug Mart

Other prominent tenants included RadioShack, Reitmans and Famous Players Highfield Cinema (which opened in 1969).

After the mall closed the Highfield Cinema in 1979, it converted the former cinema space into a large food court with many restaurants, such as Pizza Delight, A&W, Deluxe, Tim Hortons, and Ed's Sub. The mall mascot was Hifie the Bear.

== See also ==
- List of shopping malls in Canada
