= Les Promenades de Sorel =

Coordinates: 46°01′26″N 73°06′13″W

Les Promenades de Sorel is a 360,000 square feet (33,000 m^{2}) shopping mall located in Sorel-Tracy, Quebec. Its anchor stores are Walmart, Maxi and Bureau en Gros, and it has a total of 51 tenants. Long a Westcliff shopping centre, it is now managed by the Brossard-based Cogir real estate company. Ever since the conversion of Place Sorel as a strip mall and the demolition of Plaza Tracy in the 2000s, Promenades de Sorel is the sole remaining indoor mall in the city.

The mall opened on August 9, 1989, with Sears, Bonimart, Héritage and Hart. Bonimart was rebranded as Zellers in 1991, and Héritage rebranded as Maxi in 1995. Hart closed in the 2000s, allowing the adjacent Maxi to expand and double its size. Zellers closed in 2012 and was replaced that year by Walmart. On June 22, 2017, it was announced that the Sears would close in the following 19 weeks.
