= Improve Canada =

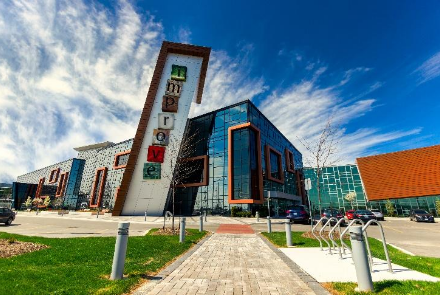
- Location: Concord, Ontario, Canada
- Coordinates: 43°47′14.2″N 79°29′51.7″W
- Address: 7250 Keele St
- Opened: June 25, 2016
- Manager: Improve Inc.
- Owner: Condominium with a collective of owners
- Architect: GH+A Design
- Num. of stores: 400
- Floors: 2
- Website: improvecanada.com

Improve Canada is a commercial shopping mall complex located in Vaughan, Ontario, Canada. The mall has about 400 home improvement stores, exclusively focused on home improvement products and services.

== Architecture ==
Improve is the first shopping mall in Canada dedicated only to home improvement. Designed by GH+A Design, a prolific Canadian architectural firm based in Montreal, the project was completed in 2013. Construction of the building was done by Belrock Design Build Inc. and it stands on the former site of the Crown Cork & Seal factory, located at the intersection of Highway 407 and Keele Street.

== History ==
The mall to serve as a home improvement centre. A place where homeowners, designers and architects could find home improvement products, services and inspiration. The construction of the mall began in 2013 at an estimate of $147 million. It was completed in 2016 and it celebrated its opening event in April 2017. The showrooms in the mall has all categories of home improvement products and services, including kitchens, bathrooms, lighting, décor, flooring, window treatments, fine art, furniture, heating and cooling and others. In 2015, Improve Canada's outdoor sign was awarded first place in the category of Electronic Message Centre at the CONSAC National Sign & Graphics Trade Show.

== See also ==
- List of shopping malls in Canada

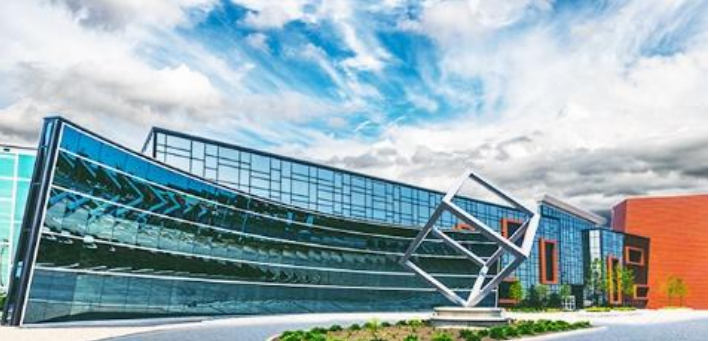
Improve Canada mall
