= Kings Transit =

Public transit agency in Nova Scotia

- Founded: 1981
- Headquarters: New Minas, Nova Scotia
- Service area: Annapolis Valley, Nova Scotia
- Service type: Public Transit
- Routes: 6
- Fleet: 13 buses
- Website: kbus.ca

Kings Transit Authority is a public transit agency operating buses in the Annapolis Valley, Nova Scotia. The system, incorporated in 1981, is funded by Kings County, Annapolis County, Digby County and the towns of Berwick, Wolfville, Kentville, Middleton, Annapolis Royal, and Digby.

Kings Transit originally operated between Wolfville and Kentville, eventually expanding to Greenwood in western Kings County.

In 2000, the Municipality of the County of Annapolis funded the system's expansion to Bridgetown and eventually Annapolis Royal. The Municipality of the District of Digby funded the expansion of Kings Transit west to Weymouth, serving Upper Clements Park, Cornwallis Park and Digby. The Municipality of the District of West Hants funded the system's eastern expansion from Wolfville through Hantsport to Brooklyn.

Today the Kings Transit system consists of seven fixed routes, primarily travelling on Trunk 1 from Grand Pre to Weymouth.

In October 2015, Kings Transit ended their Wolfville to Brooklyn route due to lack of funding from West Hants, and the towns of Hantsport and Windsor.

In January 2026, Kings Transit rebranded to Tidal Transit.

== Fleet ==
Buses on Tidal Transit are primarily painted in a white livery with the transit system's name & garage address located on the sides of the bus.

No.	Manufacturer	Model	Year	Notes
57 - 58	ElDorado National	ENC E-Z Rider	2007	Primarily used on the Bridgetown-Weymouth routes
59	Nova Bus	Nova Bus LFS	2011	
60-61	ElDorado National	ENC E-Z Rider	2018	
63	New Flyer Industries	D40LF	2005	Ex-Halifax Transit 610. Purchased in 2019. Currently being retired.
65-67	ElDorado National	ENC E-Z Rider II	2018	
71 & 73	New Flyer Industries	D40LF	2005	Ex-Halifax Transit 1049 & 1055. Purchased in 2020. Currently being retired.
74	New Flyer Industries	D40LF	2009	Ex-Durham Region Transit 8461. Entered service in April 2026. Only bus to have the "Tidal Transit" branding.
75, 77-79	Nova Bus	Nova Bus LFS	2007	Ex-Grand River Transit. Purchased in 2025. 78 is the only active unit, entering service November 8, 2025.

== Routes ==
Bus routes run every two hours, Bus fare cost per route is $4.00 for Adults and Seniors and $2.25$ for children aged 5 to 11 and students. Routes 1W & E and 2W & E are interlined in the schedule to provide hourly service per direction in the eastern, most populated part of the Annapolis Valley.

- Route 1W Wolfville to Greenwood

Travels via Trunk 1 west from Wolfville Town Centre, through the shopping center of the Annapolis Valley, New Minas, Downtown Kentville, the Kentville Industrial Park, the town of Berwick, and the Villages of Aylesford, Kingston and Greenwood before stopping at Greenwood Mall.

- Route 1E Greenwood to Wolfville

Travels route 1W backwards, starting at Greenwood Mall heading east and ending at Wolfville Town Centre.

- Route 2W Grand Pré to Coldbrook

Travels from Grand Pré Café & Roastery in Grand-Pré, through Wolfville passing the Acadia University, diverting to the Village of Port Williams, continuing through New Minas, Kentville with a diversion to North Kentville and NSCC Kingstec Campus before ending at Coldbrook Foodland in Coldbrook.

- Route 2E Coldbrook to Grand Pré

Travels Route 2W backwards from Coldbrook Foodland in Coldbroko to Grand Pré Café & Roastery in Grand Pré.

- Route 3E Bridgetown to Greenwood

Travels via Trunk 1 east from Post Office Street in Bridgetown through Lawrencetown passing the NSCC Centre of Geographic Sciences Campus, Middleton passing the NSCC Annapolis Campus, Soldiers Memorial Hospital, and the communities of Nictaux and Wilmot before turning down Highway 201 to Greenwood, eventually ending at Greenwood Mall.

- Route 3W Greenwood to Bridgetown

Travels Route 3E backwards from Greenwood Mall west to Post Office Street in Bridgetown.

- Route 4E Bridgetown to Cornwallis

Travels via Trunk 1 from Post Office Street in Bridgetown east through the community of Granville, Downtown Annapolis Royal passing the Historic site of Fort Anne, Annapolis Community Health Centre and the communities of Clementsport and Cornwallis before stopping at Cornwallis Mall.

- Route 4W Cornwallis to Bridgetown

Travels Route 4 backwards from Cornwallis Mall west to Post Office Street in Bridgetown.

- Route 5E Weymouth to Cornwallis

Travels via Trunk 1 and Highway 101 east from Foodland in Weymouth through Barton, Downtown Digby ending at the Cornwallis Mall.

- Route 5W Cornwallis to Weymouth

Travels via Trunk 1 and Highway 101 west from Cornwallis Mall, through the community of Smith's Cove, the commercial district and downtown Digby, the communities of Barton and Gilbert's Cove before stopping at Foodland in Weymouth.
