= Cherry Lane Shopping Centre =

Shopping mall in British Columbia, Canada

- Location: Penticton, British Columbia, Canada
- Coordinates: 49°28′24″N 119°35′4″W
- Address: 2111 Main Street
- Management: Judy Richards, JLL
- Stores and services: 50
- Anchor tenants: 3
- Floors: 1
- Website: www.cherrylane.ca

Cherry Lane Shopping Centre is a 270,000 square feet (25,000 m^{2}) enclosed shopping mall located in Penticton, British Columbia, Canada. Prior to opening in 1975, a contest was held in which to decide upon a name for the new shopping centre. Many submissions were received and the present name was selected. Cherry Lane showcases a good mix of retail tenants and services, including the anchor stores, London Drugs, and Save-On-Foods. It is the only enclosed shopping centre in the South Okanagan and Similkameen Valley.
