= Pacific Rim Shopping Centre =

Coordinates: 49.2673°N 124.7850°W

Pacific Rim Centre pylon sign

Pacific Rim Shopping Centre is an outdoor shopping centre in Port Alberni, British Columbia, formatted as a power centre. It is located on the north side of town at the intersection of Cherry Creek Road and Johnson Road where the latter becomes known as the Alberni Highway.

Walmart, Tyler's No Frills (formerly Extra Foods) and Staples (formerly Staples Business Depot) comprise Pacific Rim Centre's three anchor tenants. Extra Foods was the first of the mall's stores to be built, opening on November 12, 2004, followed by Wal-Mart on January 27, 2005 on the site of the former McKinnon's Dairy on Johnston Road. The Staples store opened on September 22, 2007.

On November 1, 2011, Port Alberni Extra Foods manager Tyler Steel announced that the Extra Foods store at Pacific Rim Centre would be downsized and renovated into a No Frills store, with the extra space from the renovations to be leased out. The conversion to No Frills, which began on October 6, was completed with the store reopening on December 7, 2011. Another new store, Bosley's Pet Food Plus, opened at Pacific Rim Centre on September 24, 2012, taking a space that had been vacant since the centre first opened.

== See also ==
- List of shopping malls in Canada
