= Outlet Collection at Niagara =

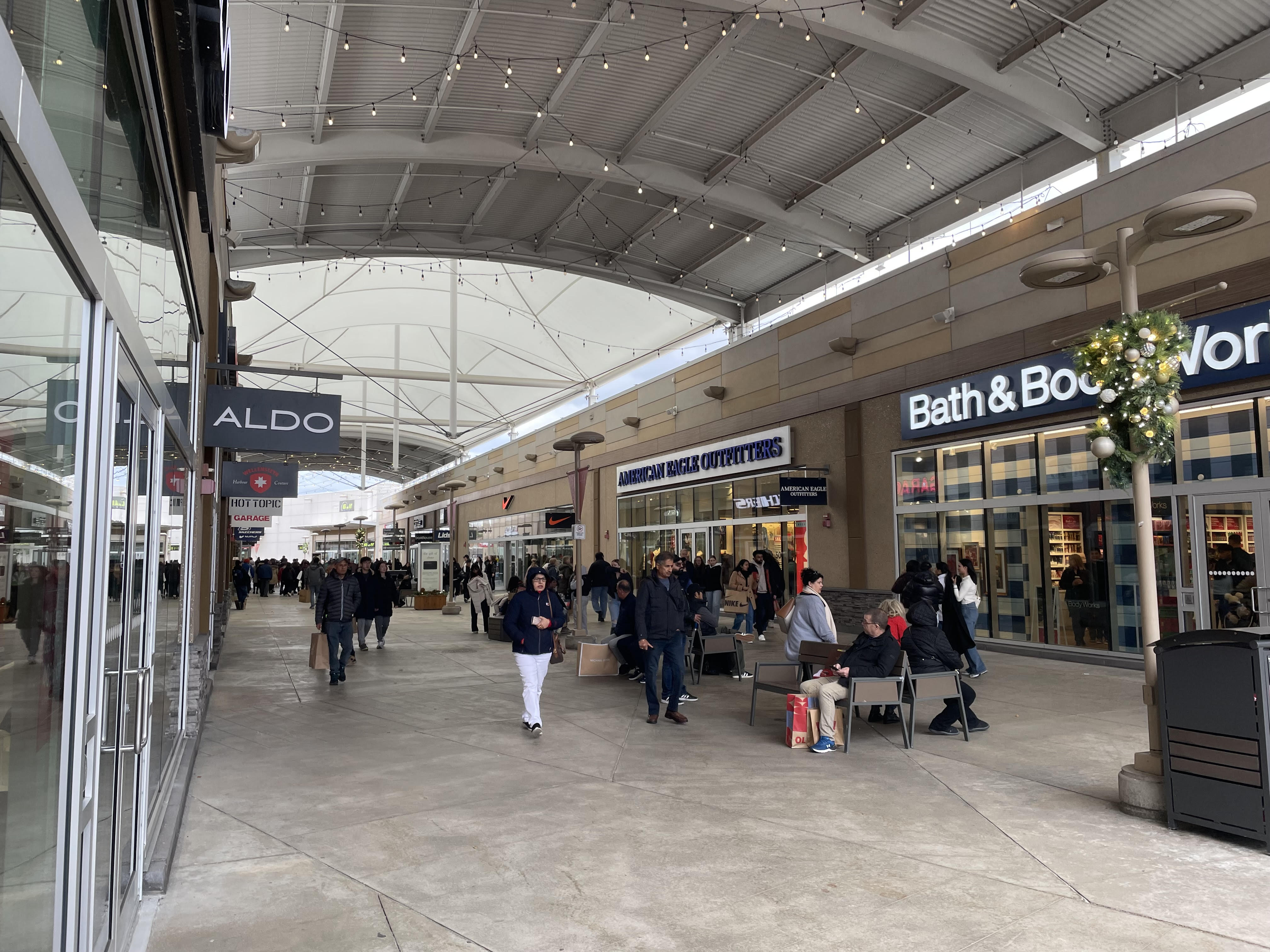
- Scene at the Outlet Collection at Niagara in November 2025
- Location: Niagara-on-the-Lake, Ontario, Canada
- Coordinates: 43.1576°N 79.1724°W
- Address: 300 Taylor Road
- Opened: May 15, 2014
- Developer: Ivanhoe Cambridge
- Manager: JLL
- Owner: Ivanhoé Cambridge
- Num. of stores: 100+
- Floor area: 553,000 square feet
- Website: outletcollectionatniagara.com

Outlet Collection at Niagara is Canada's largest open-air outlet shopping mall and is located in Niagara-on-the-Lake, Ontario, Canada. It opened on May 15, 2014.

Located a 10-minute drive from Niagara Falls, 15 minutes from the US border and 90 minutes from the City of Toronto, the property is situated along the QEW highway connecting the Greater Toronto Area and Niagara Falls.

The property features over 110+ fashion and lifestyle retailers, including Bass Pro Shops, Aritzia, Lululemon, Nike, Saks Off 5th, Coach, Under Armour, Marshalls, Michael Kors, Kate Spade and Moose Knuckles, plus many more.

White Oaks Resort and Spa are adjacent to the property.
