= Mic Mac Mall =

Shopping mall in Dartmouth, Nova Scotia

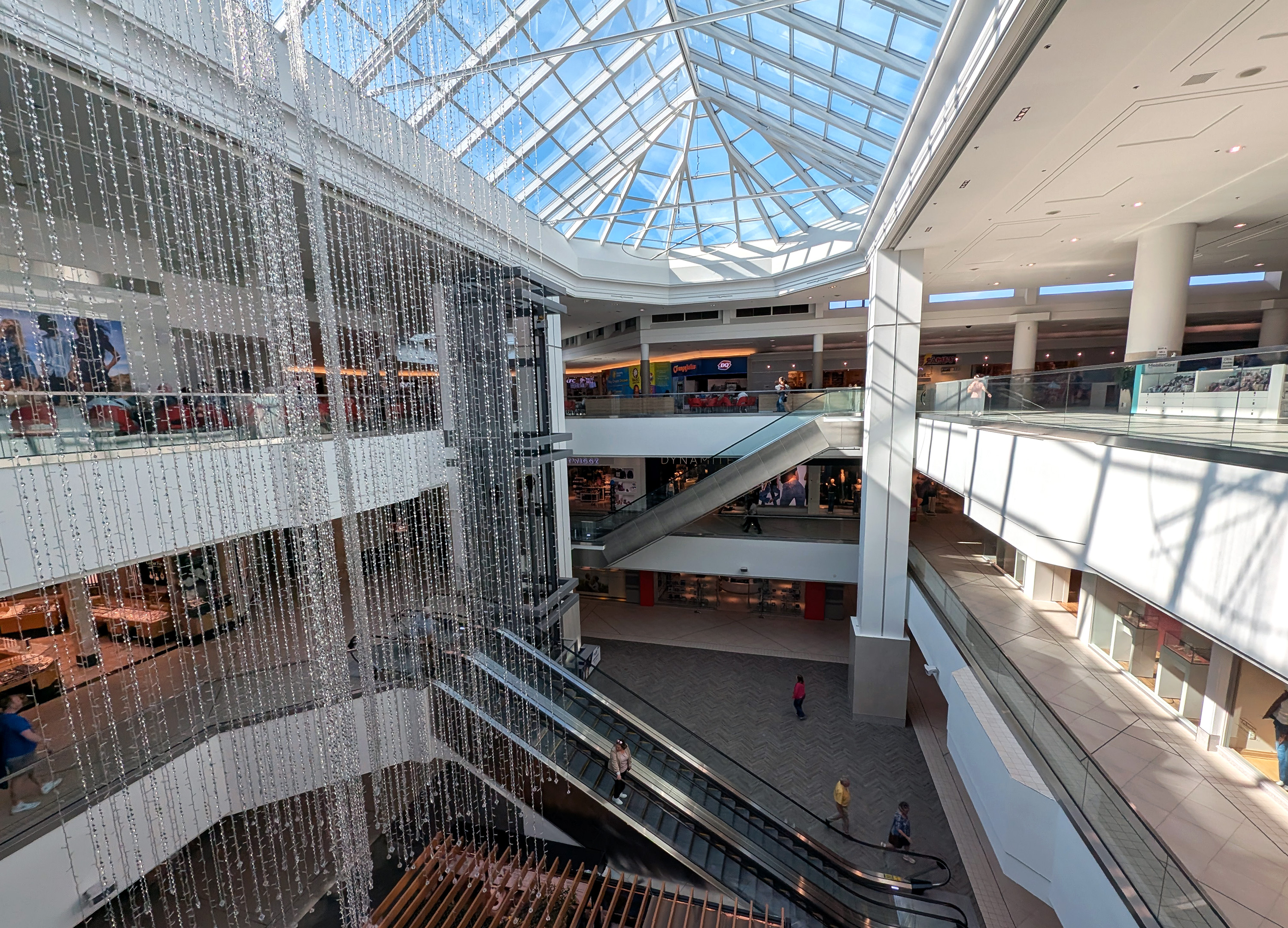
- Mall interior in 2025
- Address: 21 Micmac Boulevard, Dartmouth, Nova Scotia, Canada, B3A 4N3
- Opened: 31 October 1973
- Manager: Cushman & Wakefield
- Owner: Mic Mac Mall Limited Partnership
- Num. of stores: 160
- Num. of anchor tenants: 8
- Floors: 3
- Public transit: Micmac Terminal (Halifax Transit)
- Website: www.micmacmall.com

Mic Mac Mall is Atlantic Canada's largest enclosed shopping mall located in the community of Dartmouth, across the harbour from Halifax, Nova Scotia. It is owned and managed by Mic Mac Mall Limited Partnership.

With stores on three levels, Mic Mac Mall is a major shopping destination for the Maritimes and the only location for Decathlon east of Quebec. The mall is located in a suburban area south of Lake Micmac, next to Highway 111. It hosts a Halifax Transit bus terminal.

== History ==
The mall was announced on 13 July 1971 by the developer, Micmac Shopping Centre Limited, which was jointly owned by Simpsons, Eaton's, and a Dartmouth development company called MacCulloch and Company Limited. It was built in Micmac Village, a housing development being constructed by MacCulloch and Co. following the opening of nearby Highway 111. A Sobeys supermarket was initially planned, but Dominion ended up winning the tender to establish a store in the complex.

Construction was carried out by Robert MacAlpine Ltd. Originally anchored by Simpsons, Eaton's, and Dominion, the mall opened for business on 31 October 1973. An opening ceremony was held in November 1973 and officiated by Nova Scotia premier Gerald Regan, Mi'kmaq grand chief Donald Marshall, and Dartmouth mayor Eileen Stubbs. The shopping centre underwent major expansions in 1978 and 1981.

In 1976, Simpsons and MacCulloch jointly bought Eaton's share of the mall, increasing their equity to 50 per cent each. Simpson's was acquired by the Hudson's Bay Company (HBC) in 1978. In the 1981 fiscal year, HBC purchased the remaining 50 per cent share, giving it full ownership of the mall. In 1983, HBC shifted its real estate holdings into Markborough Properties, a wholly owned subsidiary of HBC, bringing Mic Mac Mall under the full ownership of Markborough. Mic Mac Mall underwent a $15-million renovation in 1993–94. New stores were added including Toys "R" Us and The Gap, the food court was expanded, and the mall received a cosmetic facelift that included $2 million–worth of new skylights and flooring.

In 1996, Markborough sold the mall to Cambridge Shopping Centres Limited. Ownership passed to the newly formed Ivanhoé Cambridge when Cambridge merged with Ivanhoe Corporation in February 2001. Ivanhoe Cambridge transferred title of the property to a numbered company owned solely by Ivanhoe Cambridge, 4239474 Canada Inc., in 2004.

In June 2018, Ivanhoé Cambridge announced that they planned to spend over $55 million renovating the property. The common areas were extensively refurbished and the food court was renovated. The company sold the property to Halifax developer Joe Ramia and an unnamed group of investors in 2021.

== Christmas tree ==
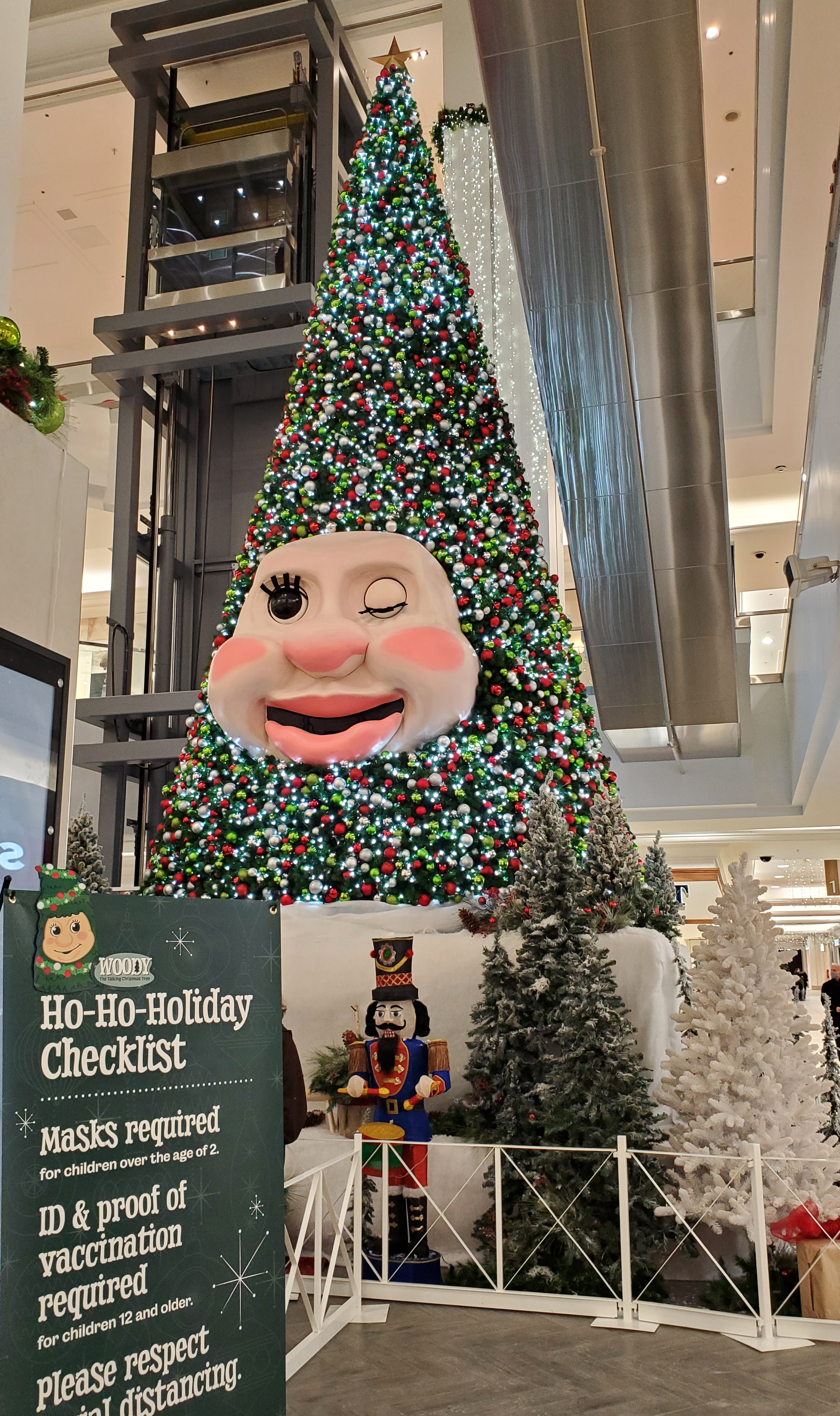
Woody the talking Christmas tree winks at a child.

Over the years, Mic Mac Mall had either delighted or frightened children with a talking Christmas tree named Woody. Woody would be set up in the centre court along with Santa where children would get the chance to talk to him. Woody had become a Christmas tradition at Mic Mac Mall and was around for over 25 years. In 2007, Mic Mac Mall decided to retire Woody due to safety concerns and extensive repairs needed to Woody's frame.

Following the shopping centre's 2021 sale, the new owners promised to bring Woody back to the mall. On November 19, 2021, Woody returned after a 15-year absence with a makeover to his appearance. Hundreds of people turned up to witness the unveiling of the tree. The tree gained national and international attention after it was shown on the November 23, 2021 episode of The Tonight Show Starring Jimmy Fallon. Woody's return was subsequently covered by several international news outlets including CNN.

== Major stores ==
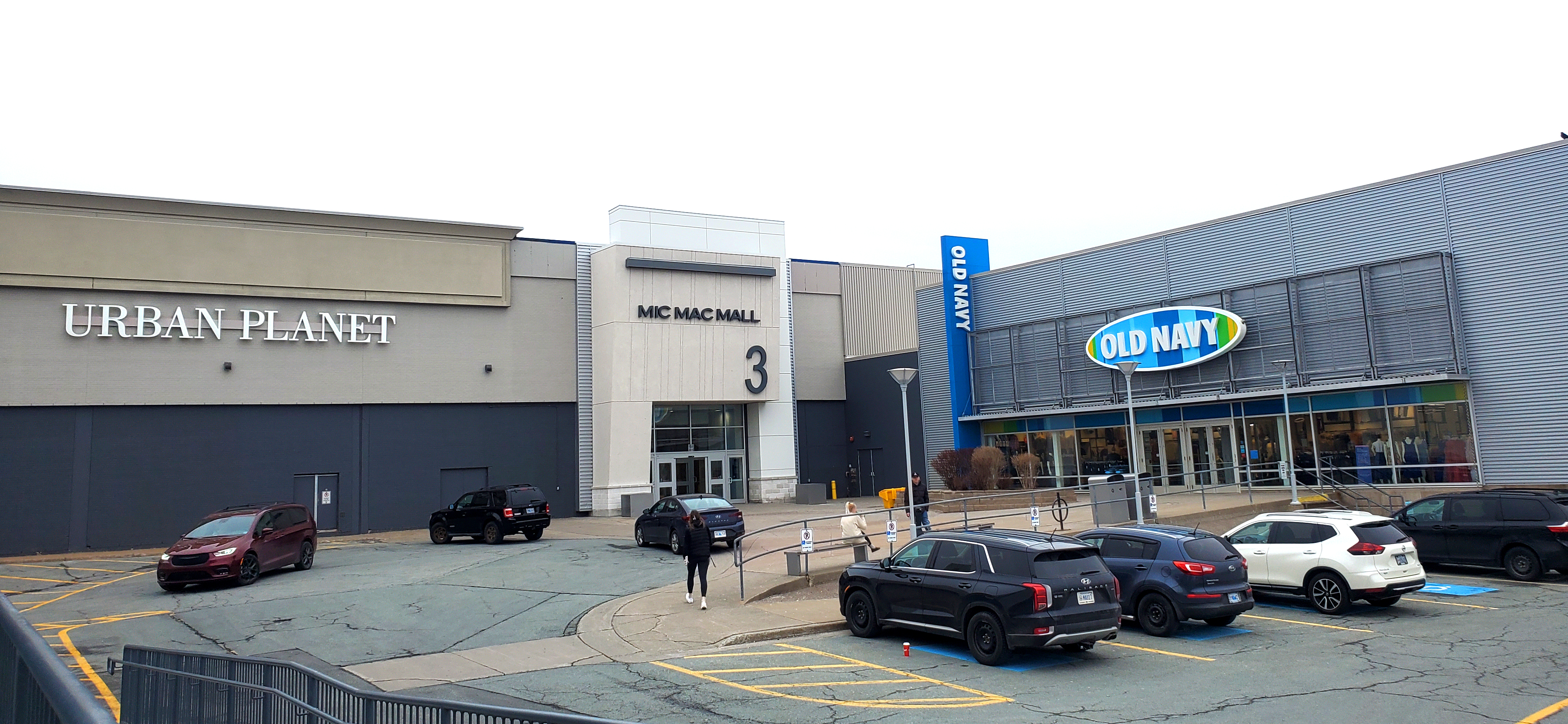
One of the mall entrances

- Old Navy (19,234 sq ft.) * Does Not Have A Mall Entrance
- H&M (20,780 sq ft.)
- Shoppers Drug Mart (10,773 sq ft.)
- Decathlon (33,046 sq ft.)
- Linen Chest (17,466 sq ft.)
- Chapters (25,752 sq ft.) * Free Standing
- Urban Planet (16,989 sq ft.)
- Winners (25,976 sq ft.)

== Former major stores ==
- Eaton's - Opened October 13th, 1973 as a single level store. Closed in 1997 as part of six store closures by the chain that year due to Eaton's ongoing financial difficulty.
- Simpsons - Opened October 31st 1973 as a single level 90,000 sq ft store. Simpsons was purchased by the Hudson's Bay Company (HBC) in 1978. In 1981, HBC renovated and expanded the Simpsons store to two levels. Converted to Hudson's Bay (The Bay) in August 1986 as HBC decided to focus Simpsons in the metro Toronto and Montreal markets.
- Hudson's Bay (151,303 sq ft.) - Converted from Simpsons in August 1986 and closed on June 1st, 2025 as part of the nationwide liquidation. This store was one of a few locations that retained the older “The Bay” logo both on exterior and interior entrances.
- Zellers - Former Eaton's - Opened in April 1999 rebuilt as a two level store and mall expansion. This Zellers location was the only two level store in the Maritimes having replaced two smaller locations. Closed on December 17th, 2012 as part of lease sale to Target by HBC. In 2023, Zellers reopened briefly in Hudson's Bay as a pop-up.
- Target - Former Zellers - Opened on September 17th 2013 - Closed on April 1st, 2015 as part of liquidation of Target Canada assets. Space has been redeveloped into several retailers.
- Toys "R" Us - Opened 1994 only location in Nova Scotia - Relocated to a nearby shopping center, Dartmouth Crossing in December 2012.
- Forever 21 - Former Toys "R" Us - Closed late 2019 and replaced with Decathlon
- Dominion - Opened 1974. Later converted to IGA, which closed in 2002 and was replaced with a Winners/HomeSense.
- HomeSense - Opened 2005 paired with Winners. Separated from Winners and Relocated to a stand alone store in Dartmouth Crossing May 2020.
- Future Shop - Opened in 1999 as a free standing store along with Chapters, Starbucks and Kent. In December 2008 it relocated to a free standing store in Dartmouth Crossing which closed early 2015 due to liquidation).
- Mark's - (formerly Mark's Work Warehouse) moved to Penhorn Mall in 1989.
- Kent - The opening date is currently unknown the Kent was a free standing store but it was relocated to Dartmouth Crossing in 2018 as of today it became an Indigo Distribution Centre.
- Designer Depot - Closed March 2018
- GAP - Closed January 2017

== Transit terminal ==
Mic Mac Mall is home to the Micmac Terminal, a major hub for Halifax Transit buses. It is served by the following routes:

- 10 Dalhousie
- 54 Montebello
- 55 Port Wallace
- 56 Dartmouth Crossing
- 67 Baker
- 72 Portland Hills

== See also ==
- List of largest shopping malls in Canada
- List of shopping malls in Canada
