= Value Village =

Chain of discount department stores

Value Village Stores, Inc.
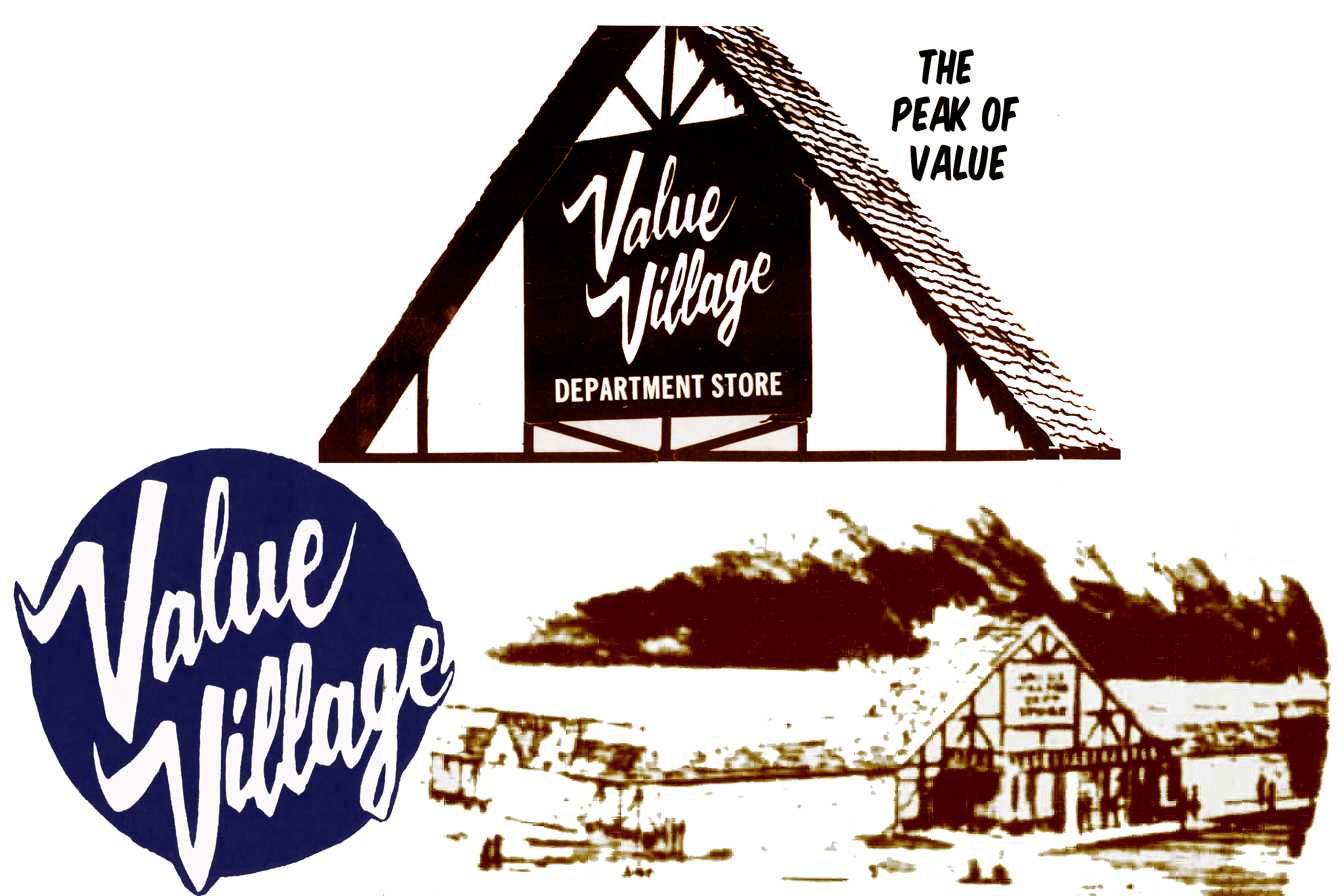
- Company type: Private
- Industry: Retail (Department & Discount)
- Founded: 1961; 65 years ago in Dolton, Illinois
- Defunct: 1989; 36 years ago
- Fate: Liquidated
- Headquarters: Dolton, Illinois
- Key people: Henry Horney
- Products: Clothing, footwear, bedding, jewelry, hardware, toys, records, school supplies, electronics, and housewares.
- Number of employees: 400

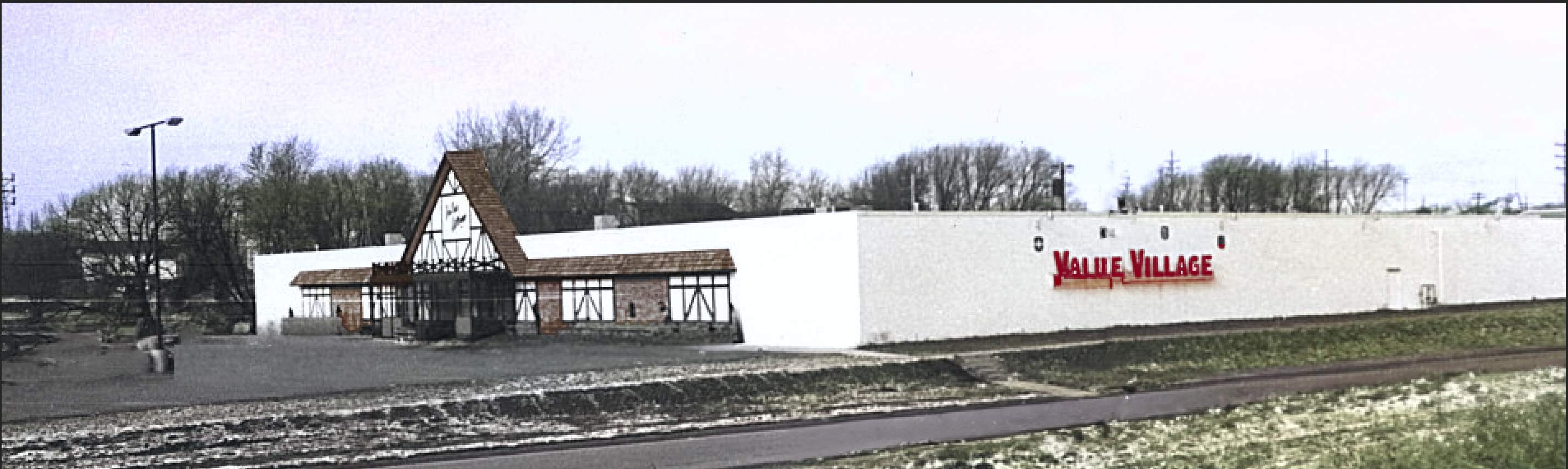
A look at a typical Value Village retail store without an adjoining, branded Value Village Mall

Value Village Stores, Inc. was a Midwestern United States chain of retail stores aimed at the discount department-store market. Henry Horney, formerly of F.W. Woolworth Company founded a small, regional chain of discount stores located in the two states of Wisconsin and Illinois that opened in 1961 and operated into 1989. Horney also had a real estate company and often built small shopping malls adjoining the discount stores. The chain had no relation to the Savers Value Village chain of thrift stores.

== History ==
The Value Village chain was founded in 1961 when founder Henry Horney decided to convert six of his 8-year old chain of smaller, five and dime variety store locations called both Horney Dime Stores and Horney Variety Stores into much larger "big box" locations. The former Woolworth employee had seen his former company build its first big box Woolco store in 1961 and S.S. Kresge and W.T. Grant were readying their Kmart and Grant City equivalents which would both launch in 1962. A 1961 Wall Street Journal article explained the "broad transformation" of the entire variety and dime store industry that was taking place as Horney was transforming his dime store portfolio.

The first two Value Village stores opened in Illinois in Harvey and Homewood, Illinois in August and November 1961. Both were established in Kroger grocery stores that closed in 1960. A third location in Dolton had replaced a Horney Variety Store and, because it was the first designed and constructed from the ground up, it would serve as the flagship location and blueprint for the chain.

The architectural style was self-described as Swiss influenced with thatched wood fronts. All new-build stores created after the Dolton flagship had the same basic blueprint. The triangular design built over store entrances served as a double-meaning in the chain's 1980s marketing slogan, “Value Village: The peak of value.” Specific departments were leased out including the pharmaceutical and hardware areas. The hardware was contracted to HWI (a chain later renamed Do It Best) and the pharmacy was handled by an Indiana-based firm.

By the late 1960s and early 1970s, the chain had expanded into small towns in Wisconsin and two more Illinois locations. Converted and new build stores were located in Portage, Monroe, Watertown, Sun Prairie, Elkhorn and Muskego in Wisconsin along with Watseka and Macomb in Illinois. Small malls were built adjoining the Monroe, Watseka, Portage, Dolton and Macomb locations. Leasing was handled by the Value Village Real Estate Corporation. Store sizes within the malls were diminutive ranging from just 600 square feet to around 3,500 square feet. Horney also continued to operate the remaining variety dime stores located in Indiana and Illinois.

=== Downturn and closure ===
The first of the Value Village stores to close was in Harvey, Illinois. Though later rebuilt, the flagship store in Dolton burned down in 1977. The chain's final store opening was the March 1980 Muskego location. By the 1980s, the chain found that it was unable to compete against other retail chains, such as Kmart, Target and Walmart. The Sun Prairie location was closed in 1983 by the local sheriff due to "unpaid bills." The last of the smaller Horney Variety Store locations appears to have closed in 1985. Newspaper columnist Matt Figi examined the Monroe, Wisconsin competitive landscape to explain the downturn of the Value Village there and the pattern that existed elsewhere for the chain. The Monroe store had opened as the town's first big box store in 1970. Kmart then opened in 1976 and when Walmart opened in Monroe in 1985, neither Value Village nor the remaining variety dime stores survived.

With the competitive landscape changing in each of the Value Village markets, closures occurred throughout the mid to late 1980s. Store liquidations reduced the Value Village chain one store at a time until the entire chain was defunct. The final two stores to close in the 11-store chain's history were the Portage location and the rebuilt Dolton flagship store late in 1989. A number of the adjoining malls were repurposed, as well. The Macomb Value Village Mall became a co-location of Spoon River College. The Monroe location was altered to house a larger retail store. The Dolton Value Village Mall was the last of the Value Village branded malls to close in 1998 and the Value Village Real Estate Corporation was dissolved.
