= Penhorn Mall =

- Mall interior in 2003
- Location: Dartmouth, Nova Scotia, Canada
- Coordinates: 44°40′21.6″N 63°32′27.8″W
- Address: 535 Portland Street, Dartmouth, NS B2Y 4B1
- Opened: 3 April 1974
- Renovated: 1982; 1989-1990; 2010
- Closed: 2010
- Developer: Atlantic Shopping Centres Ltd.
- Manager: Crombie REIT
- Owner: Crombie REIT
- Num. of stores: 92
- Num. of anchor tenants: 4
- Floor area: 441,651 sq. ft.
- Floors: 1
- Public transit: Penhorn Terminal (Halifax Transit)

Penhorn Mall was an enclosed shopping mall located in Dartmouth, Nova Scotia, Canada on Portland Street, one of the main arterials of the city. The centre currently operates as a 144,889 square foot shopping plaza, owned by Crombie REIT.

It was the largest single-level enclosed shopping mall in Atlantic Canada at 441,651 sq. ft. of total retail floor area.

The mall includes the Halifax Transit Penhorn Terminal at the front of the property, which is currently served with multiple bus routes.

== History ==
Penhorn Mall originally opened on April 3, 1974. Developed by Atlantic Shopping Centres Ltd, the predecessor to Crombie REIT. The mall had two original anchor tenants, a 44,000 sq. ft. flagship Sobeys Food Village and a 130,000 sq. ft. Woolco department store. There was also a three-screen Famous Players cinema.

In 1982, the mall underwent a major expansion that introduced a new wing, food court, and anchor tenant, Sears. The project reshaped the main concourse into a U-shaped configuration and expanded the centre's retail square footage.

In 1989 and 1990, several renovations were done to the concourse, modernizing the space. The floor and wall installations were contracted by Coastal Floor and Wall. This also included the expansion of the theatre from three to five screens.

In 1994, Woolco closed their location following their buyout, Walmart took over the space along with most other locations across Canada.

The Penhorn Mall theatre was sold to Empire Theatres in 2004, and later closed on May 17, 2007 after moving to Dartmouth Crossing. Walmart closed in the same year on January 7, 2007, leaving several major tenants vacant.

In May 2008, Crombie REIT announced they would transform the mall into an exterior shopping plaza, anchored by a new Sobeys and existing Sears. The back section of the property would be converted to a mixed-use residential development. The existing Halifax Transit bus terminal was planned to be turned into a new MetroLink bus station, although this never came to fruition.

=== Penhorn Plaza ===
Walmart was demolished shortly-afterwards and replaced with a new Sobeys. The Sears wing of the mall remained open until 2010 when it was also demolished. A new plaza section was built, housing Mark's, Penhorn Dental Centre and other tenants.

Sears closed in September 2017, before the bankruptcy of the chain. The building was converted into several tenants, including Sobeys offices.

=== Opal Ridge ===
Construction began on the Opal Ridge residential development in 2022, after being delayed for multiple years. The development is currently in the middle of construction as of 2026, with the first residential towers and townhouses being completed in late 2025.

== See also ==
- List of shopping malls in Canada
