= Great Canadian Dollar Store =

Canadian discount store franchise

Great Canadian Dollar Store Ltd.
- Type: Private
- Industry: Variety store
- Founded: 1993 in Vancouver Island, BC, Canada
- Founders: Bud Walker; Vivian Walker Sold 2015 to Kevin & Jane Kane, Quispamsis, NB
- Headquarters: Quispamsis, New Brunswick, Canada
- Number of locations: 126
- Area served: Canada
- Key people: Kevin Kane (Owner)
- Products: Party, Stationery, Housewares, Hardware, Confectionery, Toys, Crafts, Giftware, Cleaning and School Supplies
- Website: www.dollarstores.com

Great Canadian Dollar Store storefront

Great Canadian Dollar Store Ltd. (GCDS) is a privately owned Canadian franchise dollar store. The discount merchandiser was founded in 1993 by Bud and Vivian Walker, with the set-up of a head office in Victoria, British Columbia and opening of the first BC store in Kamloops. 126 franchised stores are located across Canada, including the Yukon Territory and all nine provinces other than Quebec. In 2015, Great Canadian Dollar Store was purchased by Kevin & Jane Kane of Quispamsis, New Brunswick.

== History ==
Founded in 1993 by Bud & Vivian Walker, Great Canadian Dollar Store sold products with a retail price of $1.00. As the company grew and product lines expanded, the maximum retail price moved between $1 to $3. Now with the greater access to product, Great Canadian Dollar Store has moved their to retail prices from between $1 to $20 for the majority of the product. With the purchase of Great Canadian Dollar Store by Kevin Kane, the emphasis is to grow the brand in smaller rural communities.

== Awards and recognition ==
Individual franchise members and the company have gained awards and recognition throughout the years.

- Doreen Samways, responsible for five Newfoundland stores, was recognized by Trader's Forum as 2010's "Retailer of the Year".
- Kevin Kane, a franchise member with 50 stores across Atlantic Canada, had been recognized by Trader's Forum as 2007's "Retailer of the Year".
- In 2003 Great Canadian Dollar Store Ltd. made it on the list of Profit magazine’s annual Profit 100, which ranks companies based on five-year revenue growth.
