= Carrefour du Nord =

Shopping mall in Saint-Jérôme, Quebec, Canada

Coordinates: 45°47′37″N 74°1′5″W

- Location: Saint-Jérôme, Quebec, Canada
- Address: 900, boul. Grignon
- Opened: August 11, 1976
- Manager: Westcliff
- Owner: Westcliff
- Num. of stores: 121
- Num. of anchor tenants: 4
- Floor area: 601,684 sq ft (55,898.3 m^{2})
- Floors: 1
- Parking: Outdoor (3,000 spaces)
- Website: carrefourdunord.com

Carrefour du Nord is a regional shopping mall in Saint-Jérôme, Quebec, Canada. It opened on August 11, 1976 with Steinberg's, Dominion, Kmart and 76 stores. Sears inaugurated the following year. It was enlarged in 1987, 1994 and 2003. It has always been a Westcliff property.

As of 2012, Carrefour du Nord has 121 stores and its floor area is 601,684 sq ft (55,898.3 m^{2}).

== Anchor tenants ==
- Cinémas Saint-Jérôme
- Maxi & Cie
- Sports Experts/Atmosphere
