= LW Stores =

Former Liquidation Business

LW Stores, Inc.
- The final logo which was used from 2011-2014; the only logo which had LW Stores branding
- Type: Subsidiary
- Founded: October 1986; 40 years ago in Calgary, Alberta, Canada
- Defunct: February 2014
- Headquarters: Brantford, Ontario, Canada
- Area served: Canada; US (1990s-2010)
- Products: Furniture, food, luggage, clothing, housewares, sporting goods, hardware, toys, music and makeup
- Parent: Big Lots (2010–2014)

LW Stores, Inc. was a retailer which liquidated consumer merchandise through 94 outlets across Canada and three in the United States. It also provided store-closure sales management and solved asset recovery problems in a professional manner for the financial services industry, insurance companies, manufacturers, and other organizations. LW Stores, Inc. was known as Liquidation World, Inc. until 2010. The chain operated stores in the Canadian provinces of Alberta, British Columbia, Saskatchewan, Manitoba, Ontario, New Brunswick, and Nova Scotia. It was a subsidiary of Big Lots from 2011 until LW Stores closed in 2014.

== History ==
The logo used when the company was known as Liquidation World

LW Stores was founded as Liquidation World in 1986 with the opening of its first store, at 3900 29 St NE, in northeast Calgary, Alberta in Canada. The chain grew and became the largest liquidator in Canada, with more than 1,200 employees in outlets and offices in Canada. It began operating stores in the United States in the early 1990s. Most U.S. stores were opened in locations which had been sold to bankrupt retailers, most notably Ernst Home Centers. Several former Ernst stores were acquired by the chain in the late 1990s. By 2007, due to declining sales the company had shuttered all but three of its U.S. stores. The final American store, located in Spokane, Washington was closed in April 2010 after having been in business for fifteen years.

In December 2013, Big Lots announced that it was closing all LW and Big Lots stores in Canada to focus on its retail operations in its American division. By February 2014, all Canadian Big Lots and LW Stores were closed.

== See also ==
- List of Canadian department stores
