= Rossy =

Canadian retail store chain

- Industry: Retail
- Founded: 1949
- Founder: Michael Rossy
- Products: Grocery, kitchenware, pet products, beauty/health, gifts, children's toys, bedding/lingerie, furniture, electronics, stationery/office, dishwashers, clothing/shoes
- Website: www.rossy.ca

Rossy is a Canadian regional chain of variety stores located primarily in the provinces of Quebec, Newfoundland, New Brunswick and Nova Scotia, Canada.

The company was founded by Michael Rossy in 1949. During the 1960s to the 1990s, different Rossy stores in Montreal were often located within a walking distance from each other. Today such proximities among the stores are less common; but in contrast, the chain has expanded its presence throughout the province.

The first Rossy store in Ontario was opened in 1981 in the city of Cornwall, Ontario.

In Newfoundland, the last of Hart's former Bargain Giant locations were converted in 2012 to Rossy stores.

Michael Rossy died in 2010 at the age of 88. He was the uncle of Larry Rossy, the founder of Dollarama. Despite the family ties, Michael Rossy's chain is unrelated to Dollarama. The latter is instead connected to Rossy S, a now-defunct variety store chain founded in 1910 by Michael Rossy's father.

== Types of products ==
- Grocery products
- Kitchenware
- Pet products
- Beauty/Health
- Gifts
- Children's toys
- Bedding/Lingerie
- Furniture
- Electronics
- Stationery/Office
- Dishwashers
- Clothing/Shoes
