= Neighbourhood shopping centres in Montreal =

This is a list of small shopping centres (mostly neighbourhood shopping centres) in the island of Montreal.

- A neighbourhood shopping centre is an industry term in North America for a shopping centre with 30,000 to 125,000 square feet (2,800 to 11,600 m^{2}) of gross leasable area, typically anchored by a supermarket and/or large drugstore.
- Large neighbourhood shopping centres (a.k.a. community centres) are slightly larger centres 125,000 to 400,000 square feet (11,600 to 37,200 m^{2}) with general merchandise or convenience-oriented offerings, typically with a "wider range of apparel and other soft goods, usually configured in a straight line as a strip, or laid out in an L or U shape".

== Baie d'Urfé ==
Plaza Baie d'Urfé is a small strip mall located in Baie d'Urfé, Quebec, Canada, on 90 Morgan Street across from Quebec Autoroute 20. The shopping centre is currently owned by First Capital Realty and is anchored by Maxi. It opened in 1967 but was destroyed by a fire in 1980. It was rebuilt and reopened in 1981.

== Beaconsfield ==
Centre commercial Beaconsfield is a small indoor shopping mall (one of the smallest in the West Island) located in Beaconsfield, Quebec, Canada, on 50 St. Charles Blvd. across from Quebec Autoroute 20. The anchor of this mall is a Metro Plus.

Beaconsfield opened in 1961 as an outdoor shopping centre. In 1973, it was turned into an enclosed shopping mall and the number of stores jumped from 23 to 35.

In 1992 its primary tenants were Steinberg and a Canadian Tire and the former became Metro on June 8, 1992. In 1995, Canadian Tire relocated to a new standalone store in Kirkland, Quebec, while Dollarama, Wimgym and Royal Bank took over the lease.

Formerly an Ivanhoe shopping centre, Beaconsfield was sold in 2002 to First Capital Realty by Ivanhoé Cambridge.

Royal Bank moved to a new standalone location near the mall in 2008 and the mall's northern half was demolished (except for the former Metro store) and was replaced entirely with glass. Metro Plus replaced the former Canadian Tire store in December 2008.

== Côte Saint-Luc ==
=== Cavendish Mall ===
Cavendish Mall
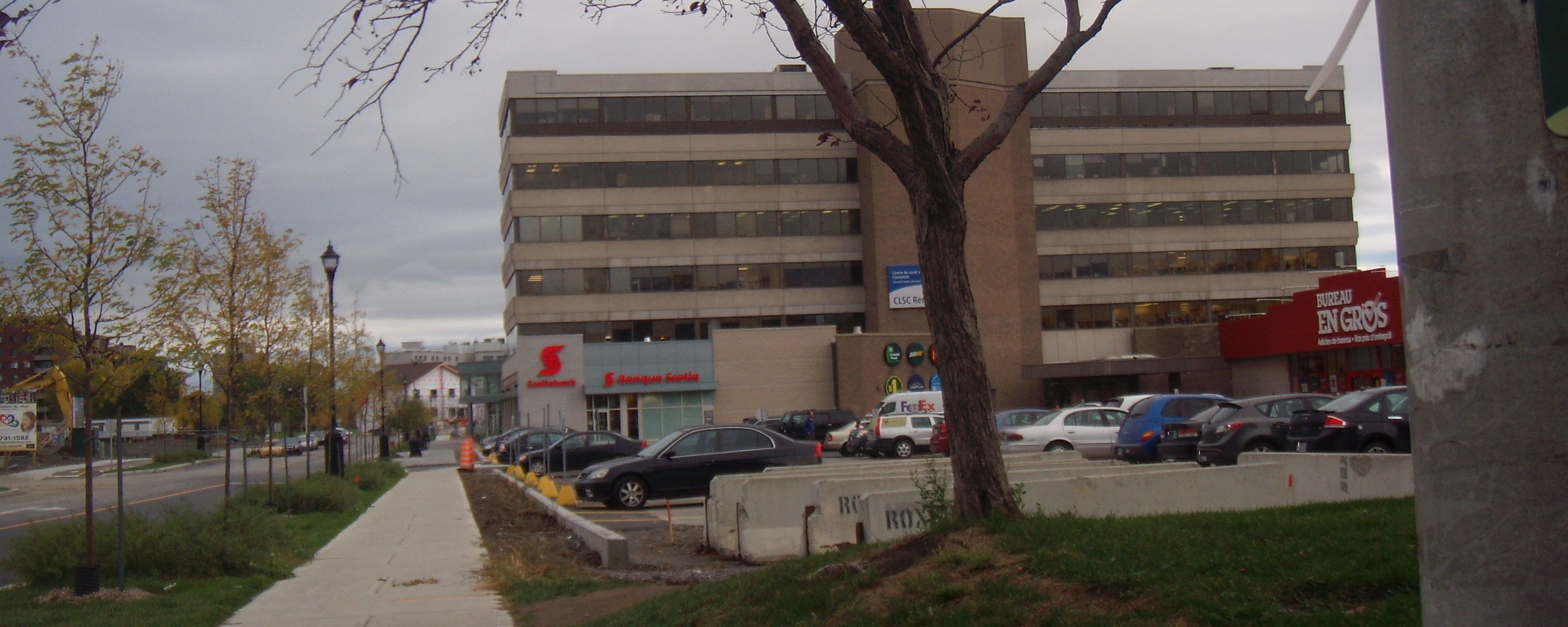
- Location: 5800 Cavendish Boulevard; Côte Saint-Luc, Quebec, Canada
- Coordinates: 45°28′33″N 73°39′55″W
- Opened: August 1973
- Manager: Mandevco Properties Inc.
- Num. of stores: 48
- Num. of anchor tenants: 2 (IGA, CinéStarz)
- Floor area: 250,000 square feet (23,000 m^{2})
- Floors: 1 (excluding highrise building)
- Parking: Outdoor
- Public transit: STM Bus: 104, 138, 161, 162, 370
- Website: quartiercavendish.com

Cavendish Mall (also known as Quartier Cavendish) is an indoor shopping centre in Côte Saint-Luc, Quebec, Canada. It includes a food court, a multiplex movie theatre and a medical clinic: the CLSC René Cassin. A small highrise office-building is adjoined to the mall's southern half. Redeveloped in 2011, the mall was reduced to almost half its original size.

David Cronenberg's 1977 film Rabid features scenes shot in the mall.

The mall has experienced declining patronage over the past decade due to an aging population. Another serious blow was the closing of its two main anchors: Eaton's and Canadian Tire. Other notable closures included Caplan Duval, The Source, Gap, Consumers Distributing, Music World, Steinberg's, Miracle Mart, Staples, Cineplex theater and restaurants: Pumpernicks, Cattleman's and Katerina's. With the southern half of the mall vacant it had been considered a dead mall throughout the 2000s. In 2010, a large portion of the mall was demolished to make way for a new residential development.

Timeline

- 1973: Mall opens. Anchors are Eaton's, Warshaw's, Steinberg's and Miracle Mart
- 1978: Warshaws closes; becomes a Canadian Tire
- : Miracle Mart closes; space divided to become Lupton Duval (later Caplan Duval) and Cineplex Odeon
- 1991: Opening of J&R Kosher Meat and Delicatessen.
- 1992: Steinberg's ceases operations; this store is taken over by IGA
- 1995: Firestone taken over by Pneus Expert.
- 1996: Consumers Distributing closes.
- 1997: Scotiabank acquires National Trust
- 1998: Eaton's closes; part of space becomes Superclub Videotron.
- 2005: Canadian Tire closes and RadioShack becomes The Source By Circuit City
- 2006: The Gap closes.
- 2007: Music World, Browns Shoes and The Source close. Dollarama opens in (part of) Canadian Tire space.
- 2009: Caplan Duval and Superclub Videotron close.
- 2010: 40% of the mall demolished to make way for residential housing development.
- 2011: Cavendish Mall rebranded as Quartier Cavendish.
- 2015: Staples closes; Econofitness gym opens in its space.
- 2018: McDonald's closes.
- 2020: Cineplex Odeon multiplex theater closes; taken over by CinéStarz Deluxe.
- 2022: J&R Kosher Meat and Delicatessen closes.

Consolidation and revitalization
In August 2007 the owners announced a partial demolition to reduce the mall and consolidate its tenants. In August 2010 the remaining tenants were relocated to the north end of the mall. Demolition of the south end began October 2010.

In December 2010 demolition of 40% of mall was completed, effectively removing its southern end. The mall was reduced to 250,000 square feet (23,000 m^{2}) of space (for let) with room for 55 stores and space for a small indoor children's play area. Previously the mall was approximately 400,000 square feet (37,161.2 m^{2}). Extensive reconstruction was done in the old Caplan Duval site, where the CLSC Rene Cassin is now located. The former section of the demolished mall underwent construction of roads and sidewalks along with newly built townhouses and semi-detached homes. This included the sale of 39 lots for single-family homes.

=== Côte Saint-Luc ===
Côte Saint-Luc Shopping Centre is a small indoor shopping mall in Côte Saint-Luc, Quebec, Canada. Built in 1956 by Ivanhoe, it is now operated by First Capital Realty. It was transformed into an enclosed mall in 1970.

The first anchors of the mall were a Steinberg and Zellers. Prohome eventually took place of the Zellers store in 1987. Steinberg went bankrupt in 1992, and the store was sold as an IGA store. Prohome closed in 1997, and Rona Le Quincallier took its place. That store closed in 2005. Jean Coutu, which relocated within the mall, took part of the space, and a Caplan Duval opened in part of the former Rona space in 2010. Also, in the late 2000s, IGA's store was remodelled by counting its exterior.

Since its inception, the mall has always had only two major anchors; the current ones are IGA and Jean Coutu (occupying the former Zellers/Prohome/Rona space).

A Blockbuster store opened in the late 1990s, and closed in 2011.

=== Décarie Square ===
Décarie Square
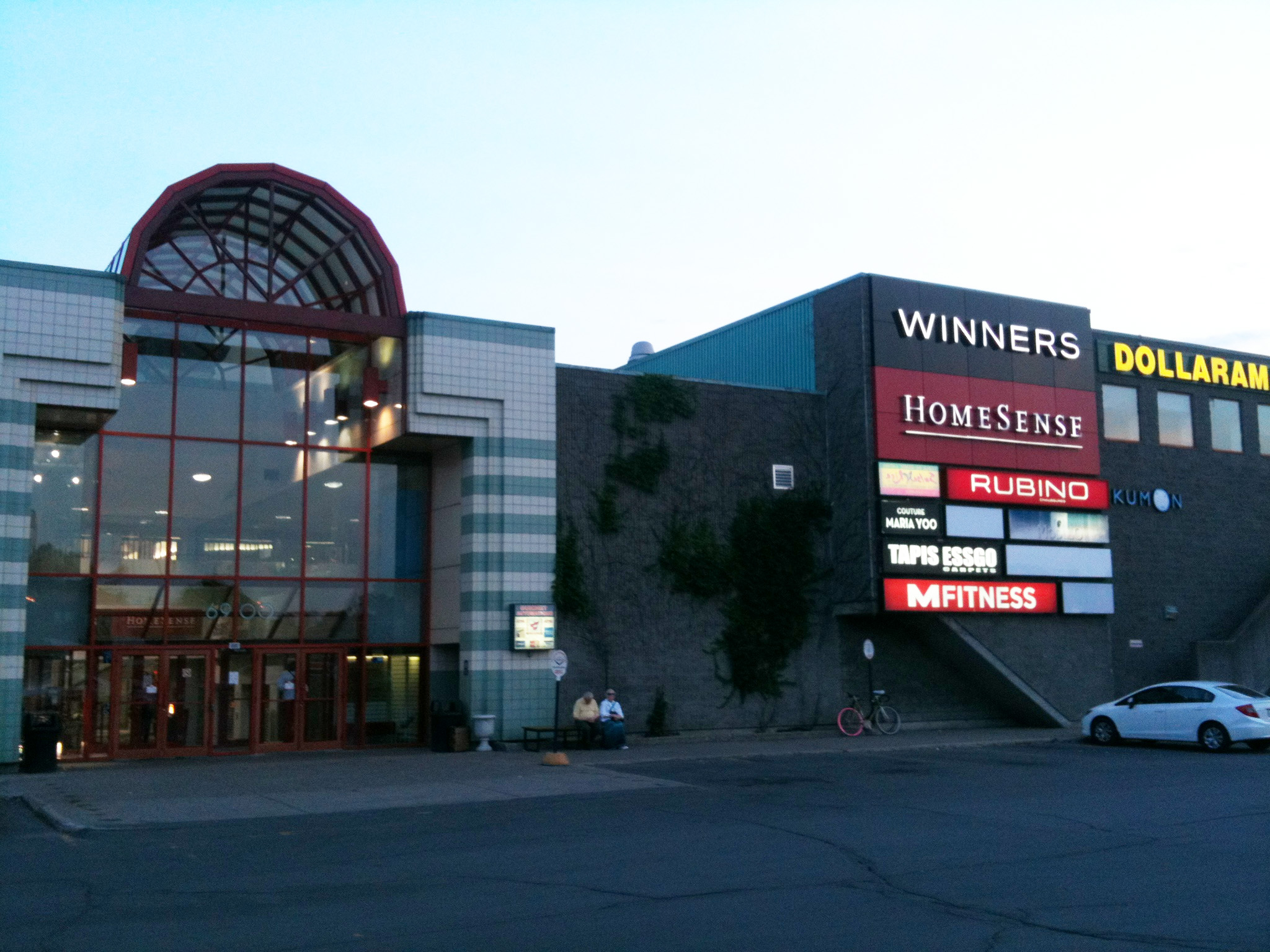
- The main entrance of Décarie Square
- Location: Côte Saint-Luc, Quebec, Canada
- Coordinates: 45°29′28″N 73°39′1″W
- Address: 6900 Décarie Blvd
- Opened: March 1977
- Owner: Canpro Investments Ltd.
- Num. of anchor tenants: 1 (Winners/HomeSense)
- Floor area: 486,000 sq ft (45,200 m^{2})
- Floors: 3 (includes office level)
- Parking: Indoor & outdoor
- Public transit: at Namur; Namur Terminus; STM Bus: 17, 160 and 166
- Website: www.decariesquare.com

Décarie Square is a three-story indoor shopping mall, with two floors of retail shopping and one floor of office space, located on the outskirts of Côte Saint-Luc, a city in Montreal, Quebec, Canada.

The mall was constructed in 1977 at a cost of over $20 million, under the ownership of Oshawa Group. Going back as far back as the mid-1980s, it has been described as a white elephant due its extremely high vacancy rate and low shopper traffic. Even today, much of the space in the mall remains empty with for rent signs plastered on vacant shop windows.

The mall includes the chain store Winners-HomeSense and various independent discount and service shops. A fitness gym and a video lottery gambling bar are also situated within the mall. Government service offices of the SAAQ automobile licence bureau, Saint-Laurent Local Employment Center and Service Canada employment insurance center are also found within the mall, as well as the Décarie Medical Centre. The third floor is exclusively for rental office space.

Galeries des Sources
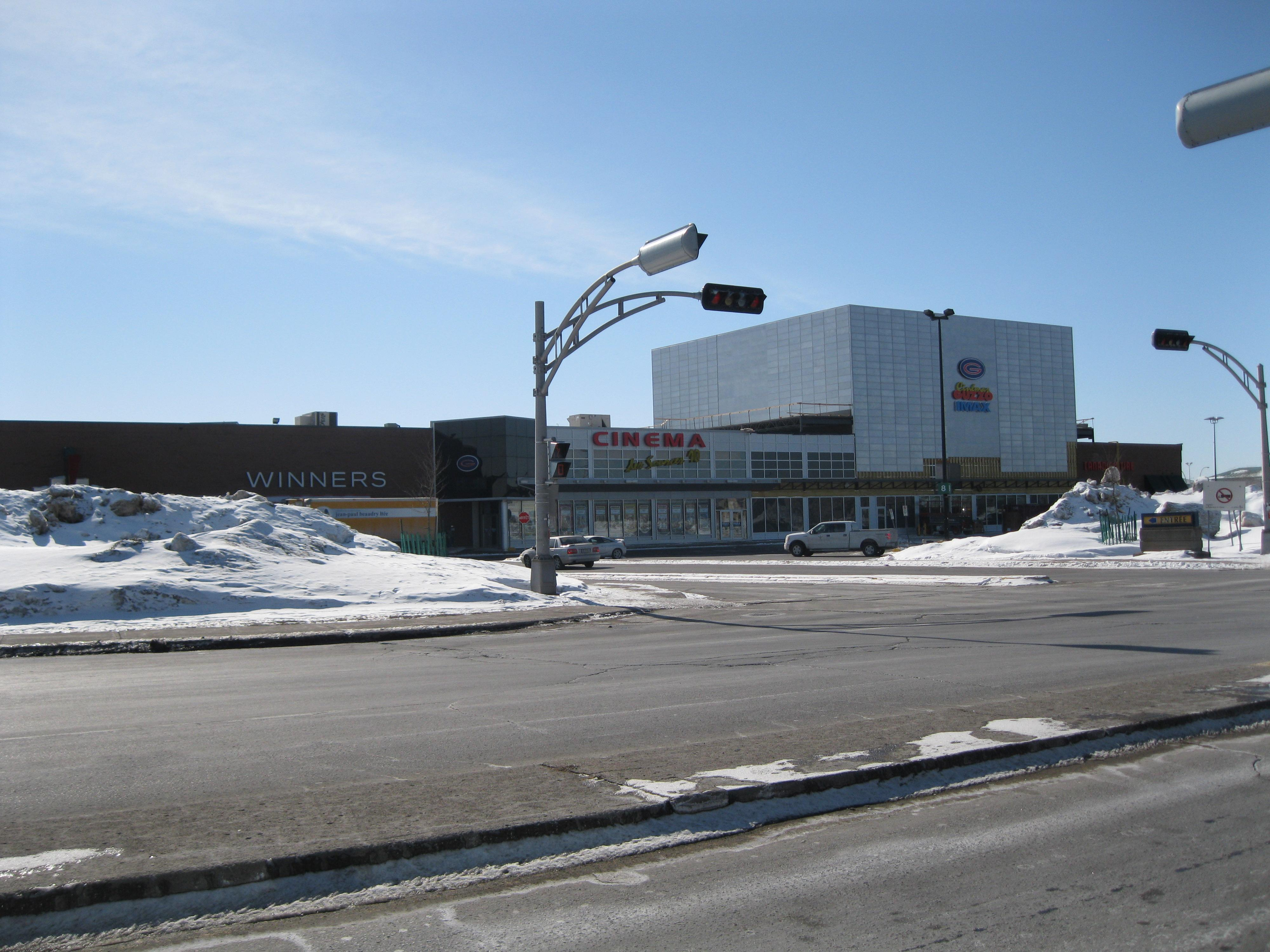
- Location: Dollard-des-Ormeaux, Quebec
- Coordinates: 45.4838°N 73.7190°W
- Opened: October 4, 1966
- Developer: Ivanhoe Corporation
- Owner: Cogir
- Num. of anchor tenants: 5 (Cinémas Guzzo, Bureau En Gros, Super C, Winners, Canadian Tire)
- Floors: 1
- Parking: Outdoor
- Public transit: STM Bus: 208, 209, 215, 356, 376, 409

By 2011, in an effort to re-purpose much of the vacant shopping space into a more profitable venture, the mall owner, Canpro Investments Ltd., moved ahead with a project to convert more than a fifth of the 486,000-square-foot (45,200 m^{2}) mall's retail space into a medical centre (spanning three floors) with room for doctors' offices. The construction and renovation cost was estimated at the time between $10 million and $15 million, and was started before any interested parties came forward or signed any leases; this was in essence a "build it and they will come strategy". The late David Azrieli, former head of Canpro, was quoted as saying "I'm willing to sign off that by August 2012 it will be ready and occupied." After a slow start, by 2017, the medical center had over 20 tenants with 30,000 square feet still available to lease. The space currently includes a walk-in clinic and various specialists' and doctors' offices.

== Dollard-des-Ormeaux ==
=== Galeries des Sources ===
Galeries des Sources (originally West Island Mall until 1988) is an indoor shopping mall owned by Cogir located in the bordering cities of Dollard-des-Ormeaux, Quebec and Dorval, Quebec, Canada on Des Sources Blvd. and Quebec Autoroute 40. Popular stores include Marché Adonis, Cinemas Guzzo, Canadian Tire and Bureau en Gros. Restaurants inaccessible from the inside of the mall but with their own exterior entrance include Bellepro's, Jack Astor's, and Marathon Souvlaki, the latter occupying some of the old M Store space. Other types of businesses with no indoor mall entrance include the clinics, the Guzzo movie theatre, the Canadian Tire hardware store, and Optimum personnel.

The mall opened on October 4, 1966, and was anchored by Steinberg's and Miracle Mart. It was built by Ivanhoe Corporation which also was the original manager of the mall until January 2002.

The mall was expanded in 1986, and Steinberg moved out to the expanded space, becoming a Marché Du Jour (later Steinberg Plus in 1988 and Xtra in 1991). In addition, Miracle Mart was renamed M Store, and reducing the space of the store as well, giving part of the former Miracle Mart space to Bouclair. The Steinberg space (not counting Marché Du Jour/Steinberg Plus/Xtra) was left vacant until Canadian Tire occupied it in 1991. A mechanic centre was built as a result of expansion of the former Steinberg store that time. After Canadian Tire moved in, it kept the old Steinberg outdoor entrance, which has since been demolished.

In 1992, the Xtra store and M Store closed after Steinberg went bankrupt; Super C and Club Biz replaced the former Xtra store. Winners occupied the former M space in 1994, alongside a Club Ultima.

In 1993, the west mall entrance was discontinued in favor of a Coconuts play park (which closed in early 1999; now a dental office and pediatric medical centre).

Club Ultima closed in 1996, with a 10-screen Cinemas Guzzo occupying the old space in 1998. There is no mall entrance to Cinemas Guzzo. There was no outdoor entrance to Club Ultima, thus the indoor Club Ultima entrance became a Rubino shoe store. The Rubino shoe store moved to the old Stokes warehouse store in the early 2000s, with EconoSport occupying the old Rubino space, and it is currently used by Benix & Co.

Club Biz went bankrupt, and its previously occupied site became Bureau en Gros which officially launched on June 1, 1996 (though the store had already opened its doors before that date).

Also, Consumers Distributing left the mall in 1996, with its current tenants Corbeil Appliances occupying the first half of it in 1998. The second half was occupied by a Stokes warehouse store.

In the late 2000s, Bouclair reduced its space, and an Elixir restaurant took the other half of the former Bouclair space. Following the expansion of Canadian Tire in 2009, the mall entrance for Canadian Tire was closed, and L'Aubainerie Entrepôt took the old mall entrance.

In 2024, the Cinemas Guzzo movie theatre closed and was replaced by a CineStarz Deluxe movie theatre in October 2025.

== Dorval ==
=== Dorval Gardens ===
Dorval Gardens
- Coordinates: 45.44449°N 73.74304°W
- Address: 352 Dorval Ave; Dorval, Quebec, Canada; H9S 3H8
- Opened: April 7, 1954
- Developer: Ivanhoe Corporation
- Manager: CentreCorp Management Services Ltd.
- Num. of stores: ≈ 60
- Num. of anchor tenants: 3
- Floor area: 360,000 sq ft (33,000 m^{2}). (GLA)
- Floors: 1
- Parking: Outdoor
- Public transit: Dorval Bus Terminal; STM Buses
- Website: lesjardinsdorval.ca

Dorval Gardens (French: Les Jardins Dorval) is a shopping mall in the suburb of Dorval, in Montreal, Quebec, located on Dorval Avenue near Autoroute 20. It is the oldest shopping centre in the West Island and the fourth in Montreal after Norgate, Village Champlain and Le Boulevard. It was built in 1954 by Sam Steinberg and his Ivanhoe Corporation. The shopping centre was owned for more than 45 years by Ivanhoe but was sold in 2001. It is currently managed by CentreCorp Management Services Ltd. Anchor stores are Walmart, Hudson's Bay (closing in late 2021) and Maxi.

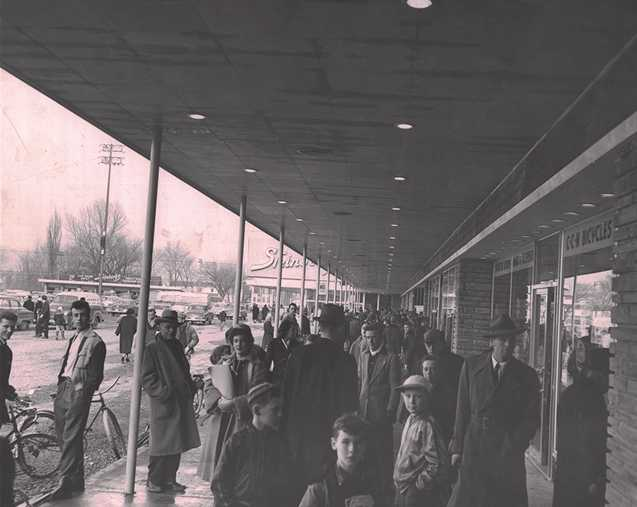
Dorval Gardens in 1954

Dorval Gardens was originally built as a large L-shaped strip mall which opened in 1954 with 35 stores. Anchor stores in 1954 were Morgan's department store and Steinberg's supermarket. Steinberg's and most of the original 35 tenants opened on April 7, 1954. A minority of tenants opened at slightly later dates including Morgan's which inaugurated on April 29, 1954. At 57, 000 square feet of floor space, it was the largest of the three suburban Morgan's locations until it was surpassed by a new store at Lawrence Plaza in North York.

Morgan's added a second floor to its store on August 28, 1961. The Morgan's store was destroyed by a major fire on April 21, 1969, which caused over $1.0 million in damage (equivalent to $8.3 million in 2025) and required the help of firefighters from other neighbouring West Island municipalities to contain the blaze. Following the destruction of its store, Morgan's relocated to a temporary location on the site of a former bowling alley in the same building as the Dorval Theatre. The store was rebuilt afterwards and reopened on March 4, 1970. It was rebranded as The Bay in 1972.

Dorval Gardens was converted into an enclosed shopping centre in 1968. In the 1970s, Dorval Gardens was surrounded with glass (save for Steinberg's and The Bay). In 1985, the mall was expanded into its current layout, doubling its number of stores: the original parts of the mall correspond to what is to the south or west of the enclosed walkway, including the spaces currently occupied by Maxi and Hudson's Bay; areas to the east or north of the walkway were added. These additions included a Pascal hardware store, which relocated from a nearby strip mall.

The Pascal store was closed and emptied in 1991, before reopening as Zellers in October 1992. Zellers closed its doors on January 22, 2012. Walmart assumed the lease and remodelled the store before opening it to the public in September 2012. This location was not one of the 39 Zellers stores that Walmart Canada acquired from Target Canada at a similar time.

In mid-1992, the Steinberg's supermarket became a Provigo despite the presence at the time of another grocery store with the same banner in the adjacent strip mall (located on 960 Herron Road). By late 1992, the Provigo at Dorval Gardens had been rebranded to its sister chain Maxi which remains to this day.

A Dollarama operated for a number of years before closing in late 2009. After a one-year absence, Dollarama returned to the mall in the space of Pharmaprix which itself has relocated to Dollarama's former space.

Sports Experts returned to the mall, opening November 1, 2012 and occupying the same space it did in the 2000s (formerly Cohoes in the 1990s and early 2000s).

Hudson's Bay announced it will be permanently closing its store location at Dorval Gardens by September 2021, after 67 years of operation.

== Montreal ==
=== Boulevard Shopping Centre ===
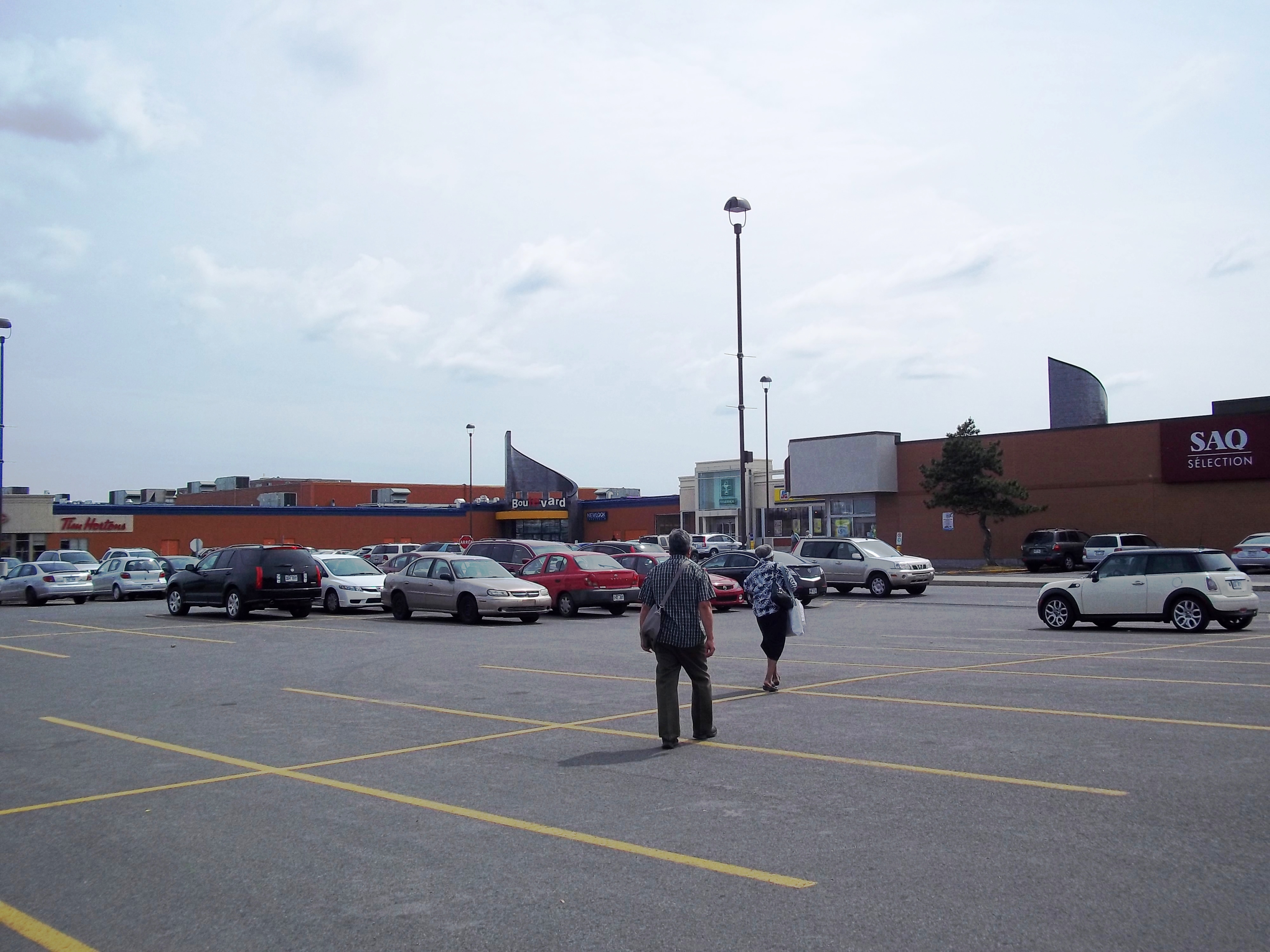
Le Boulevard

Le Boulevard Shopping Centre is a small indoor shopping centre at the corner of Jean-Talon East and Pie-IX Boulevard in Montreal. The mall was officially inaugurated on September 29, 1953, with 32 stores. It was the third shopping centre built in the Montreal area, preceded by Norgate and Village Champlain.

Le Boulevard is built in the shape of a L and is composed of 70 stores. The former The Bay store (originally Morgan's) and Metro Plus (originally Steinberg's) each border a side of the mall, with Canadian Tire (formerly Pascal's) being in the middle. Geographically, Le Boulevard is situated partly in the Saint-Michel neighbourhood and partly in the former city of Saint-Léonard. The mall is just a block north of the Rosemont neighbourhood.

Le Boulevard was previously managed by Crofton Moore.

The Bay closed its Le Boulevard location on September 14, 2018, a few days shy of the store's 65th anniversary. Its first floor was occupied by a Surplus RD furniture store, but closed in 2022. Surplus RD has since been replaced by an Urban Planet store.

Montreal Metro transit Blue line extension

Le Boulevard was slated to close on December 1, 2021, after 68 years and be demolished to accommodate the addition of new stations of the Montreal Metro Blue Line. However it was later announced that the shopping mall will remain open and that only its parking lot will be used for the extension of the Blue Line. Since the Société de transport de Montréal (STM) had already been forced by a provincial court to purchase the entire mall from owner Crofton Moore as part of its expropriation of the land, Le Boulevard will get a new landlord. The STM gave the right to operate the shopping centre to its subsidiary Transgesco which in turn hired the service of Colliers International to support it and to manage the operations of Le Boulevard.

In March 2023, the STM announced that part of the shopping mall will need to be demolished by early 2024 for the construction of its new Metro transit station (not to be confused with the Metro grocery store). The upcoming demolition affects Urban Planet (former RD Surplus) as well as the empty space left by the vacated SAQ store. Jean Coutu's current location will also be torn down but the pharmacy will relocate elsewhere in the mall and will live on in the trimmed shopping centre, as will the anchors in the eastern part such as the Metro grocery store and Canadian Tire. The five tenant spaces south of the current Jean Coutu pharmacy, including The Source, will also be razed. Overall, Le Boulevard will lose its western portion which is basically the part that is in the Saint-Michel neighbourhood, representing about a third of the shopping mall.

Comparison of anchor spaces:

| 1953 | 2018 |
|---|---|
| Steinberg's | Metro Plus |
| Morgan's | The Bay (closed in September 2018) |
| Pascal | Canadian Tire |
| Woolworth | Various stores |

Zellers

A small Zellers store was in the Boulevard shopping centre from about 1955 until 1976. It directly touched the north side of the Morgan/Bay store. After Zellers closed, The Bay expanded into the former space of Zellers and merged it into its own store.

Today, the old Zellers space can be recognized as the section of the vacant Bay store that had one floor (in contrast to the original section of The Bay, which had two floors). (Note: Morgan's at Le Boulevard was itself a one level store until 1958.) The basement of The Bay, which was closed to the public in 2011, was also part of this defunct Zellers store.

=== Carrefour de La Pointe ===
Carrefour De La Pointe
- Location: Montréal, Québec
- Coordinates: 45.6549532233°N 73.5126551395°W
- Address: 12675, rue Sherbrooke Est
- Opened: August 26, 1976
- Owner: Creccal Placements Ltée
- Num. of anchor tenants: 2
- Floors: 1 (there is a minor section with two floors)
- Parking: Outdoor
- Website: carrefourdelapointe.com

Carrefour de La Pointe is small indoor mall and one of the few enclosed malls in Montreal's Rivière-des-Prairies–Pointe-aux-Trembles borough. It first opened on August 26, 1976, with Zellers as anchor and retail chain stores like Reitmans and SAQ Sélection. In 1981, the mall was sold to First City and ABRIM, then ABRIM and SITQ in 1990, later Ivanhoé Cambridge and then to its current owners Creccal Placements Ltée in 2004. Zellers closed down and was replaced by the current Walmart in October 2012.

The mall also has minor tenants such as Reitmans, National Bank, Jean Coutu and Dollarama, as well as two in-mall restaurants: Prince d'Orient and Montaza. There are also free-standing SAQ Sélection and Tim Hortons buildings.

=== Carrefour Langelier ===
Carrefour Langelier
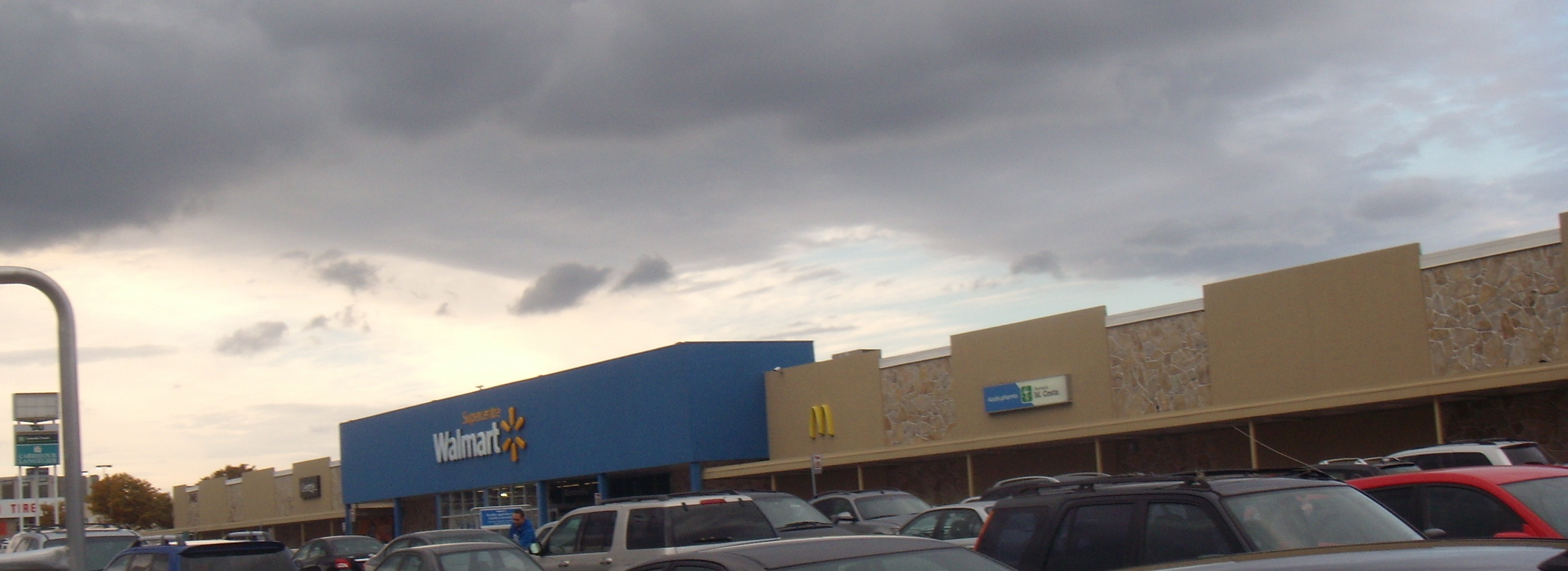
- Location: Saint-Léonard, Quebec, Canada
- Coordinates: 45.48998°N 73.62764°W
- Address: 7373 Langelier
- Opened: April 9, 1970
- Num. of stores: 50+
- Num. of anchor tenants: 2
- Floors: 1
- Parking: Outdoor
- Website: carrefourlangelier.com

Carrefour Langelier is a small indoor shopping mall located in the Saint-Léonard borough of Montreal, Quebec, Canada on the corner of Langelier Blvd. and Jean-Talon Blvd. The major anchors are Walmart and Ciné Starz, and minor anchors such as TD Canada Trust, Jean Coutu and Dollarama.

The mall opened in 1970 as Centre Langelier with 50 tenants anchored by the Marché Union and Woolco. In the 1970s, the Marché Union evolved into Aliments Hypermarché and after IGA Boniprix; it eventually closed in the 1990s.

In 1994, Walmart replaced Woolco. In October 2012, Walmart transitioned to a Walmart Supercentre, without an increase in size of its retail space. It remains to this day the last of the original 1994 Walmart Canada stores in the Montreal Island that is still located in its former Woolco space.

A standalone Burger King used to exist at the mall, but was closed in 2009 and demolished in 2011.

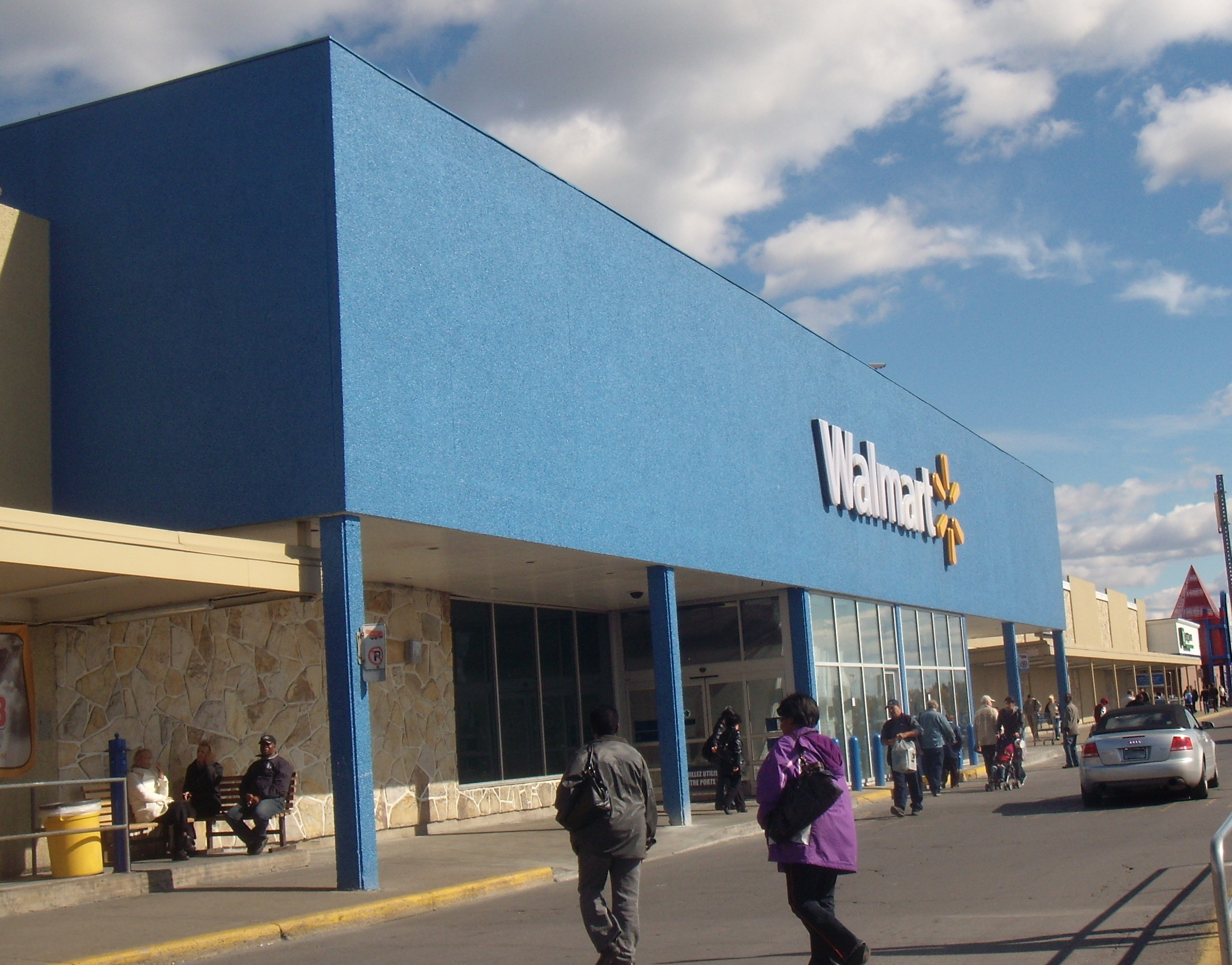
Walmart store at Carrefour Langelier before its conversion to a Walmart Supercentre in October 2012

=== Centre Le Cavalier (defunct) ===
Centre Le Cavalier was a shopping mall located in the LaSalle borough of Montreal, Quebec, Canada located on Champlain Blvd., next to the Place LaSalle shopping centre. The major anchors were Maxi and Walmart.

The mall began in 1971 with a Woolco, Wise and Dominion Stores. By the late 70s, Wise had pulled out of the mall and its space was divided between Canada Post's sorting office and 3 boutiques on the mall. By the 1980s, Dominion became Provigo. By 1992, Provigo became Héritage. In 1994, Wal-Mart took the former space of Woolco after Woolworth sold Woolco to Walmart. In 1995, Héritage was renamed Maxi. In the summer of 1999 the Maxi store in this mall was shuttered and used by Walmart as extra storage space. In 2002, Walmart closed and they relocated to a standalone location next to the Carrefour Angrignon shopping centre and the last stores were also closed.

The mall was demolished in sections between 2002 and 2003. The former Walmart store was removed in the autumn of 2002 to be replaced by an IGA Extra store. Shortly thereafter, the former Provigo was demolished to allow for construction of condos. Canada Post and Scotiabank stayed in the mall right until the end in 2003. In the early 2000s space that had formerly been a Sunnys gas bar was cleared (upon demolition it was landscaped) and paved into new parking space to allow the vacant parking space adjacent to the Caisse Populaire to be redeveloped as a new Jean Coutu store.

=== Domaine ===
Centre Domaine is small indoor shopping centre located in the Mercier-Hochelaga-Maisonneuve borough of Montreal, Quebec, Canada at the corner of Sherbrooke St. and Langelier Blvd., on Granby Ave. It is a two-minute walk from the Langelier métro station and about 1 km from the nearby larger Place Versailles shopping centre. It is currently operated by First Capital Realty. The anchors are Metro Plus and Walmart Canada.

It opened on August 13, 1959, with 25 tenants anchored by Steinberg and Woolworth, and were shortly joined by Zellers and Reitmans.

In late 1972, the Domaine shopping centre was acquired by Cadillac Fairview (called at the time simply Fairview) from Parkdale Home Development Corp. Cadillac Fairview then proceeded to announce in 1974 that the centre would both be enlarged and turned into an enclosed mall. The enclosed mall officially opened in November 1974. The shopping centre grew from 130,000 square feet of retail space to 225,000 and doubled its number of stores from 27 to 55. An Horizon department store opened on March 5, 1975.

Horizon was succeeded by Eaton's Bargain in 1979 and the original Zellers store in the mall closed in 1980. The latter was substituted mainly by Rossy in 1981, while Eaton's Bargain closed in 1982. After an absence of 3 years, Zellers returned to the mall in 1983, this time as an anchor store, assuming the lease of the former Eaton's Bargain store. The new Zellers was slightly bigger than the Horizon/Eaton's store it replaced because its Family Restaurant stood on a portion of the old Zellers that closed in 1980.

In the 1980s, Woolworth was losing ground in Quebec and the store in the mall was shut down. Its space has since been subdivided.

By 1992, the Steinberg supermarket chain went bankrupt and the store at the mall was sold to Metro Inc. The Metro became a Metro Plus after the supermarket expansion in the early 2000s.

In June 2012, Zellers closed and was replaced by Walmart in October 2012.

=== Forest ===
Centre commercial Forest is a small shopping mall in Montreal, Quebec, Canada, in the borough of Montréal-Nord. It is located on Pie-IX boulevard. The anchor was a Bureau en Gros (Staples). Others stores includes Pharmaprix, Dollarama, Rossy and a Yellow shoe source. There is a St-Hubert restaurant in the parking lot, at the eastern part of the mall. Formerly an Ivanhoe mall, it is now owned by RioCan.

Defunct grocery stores chain Steinberg originally built a supermarket on this land in December 1955. In September 1956, a strip mall anchored by Woolworth at the other end was added to form the Forest shopping centre, making this Steinberg one of the most profitable for the company. In the early 1970s, the mall was enclosed.

In the 1980s, facing difficulties with others supermarket chains, the Steinberg became a Steinberg Super Marché, more akin to the 21st century supermarket. In 1992, when Steinberg went bankrupt, Provigo bought the store and after being a Provigo for a while, it was converted to Héritage (Provigo's former discount supermarket banner). After being Héritage, it became a Maxi.

Woolworth, which had survived the company's waves of closures in the 1980s, finally succumbed in 1994 when the chain folded in the country. Rossy replaced Woolworth.

When Loblaws (after having bought Maxi in 1998) opened a new Loblaws location south of the mall, the Maxi supermarket was closed and the space was taken by Bureau en Gros. Some years later, a Casa Grecque restaurant opened in a small part of the Bureau en Gros.

In spring 2011, due to Blockbuster financial difficulties, one third of all Blockbusters in Quebec were closed, including the location in the mall. The space formerly occupied has been taken by the Dollarama store.

=== Galeries Lachine ===
Galeries Lachine is a small indoor shopping centre located at the intersection of 32e Avenue and Rue Remembrance in Lachine. This enclosed shopping centre offers 45 units totalling 167,383 sq. ft featuring retailers such as Maxi, Pharmaprix, Dollarama, and Rossy.

Galeries Lachine opened in mid-March 1972 with 48 stores and the original anchor tenants were Steinberg and Miracle Mart. Some of the retail chains were Reitmans and Laura Secord. The mall had two banks: the Royal Bank and the Toronto-Dominion.

In the 1980s, the Miracle Mart chain progressively adopted the M name and the store at Galeries Lachine got converted during the phase in April 1987 that rebranded the locations in western Montreal.

The Steinberg's supermarket was replaced by Provigo on June 8, 1992.

Galeries Lachine was one of many shopping centres in Montreal that used to be owned by Ivanhoe. It now is the property of RioCan.

=== Galeries Normandie ===
Normandie
- Galeries Normandie
- Location: Ahuntsic-Cartierville, Montreal, Quebec
- Coordinates: 45.5376299°N 73.6995986°W
- Address: 2062 Rue de Salaberry
- Opened: August 22, 1961
- Num. of stores: 43
- Num. of anchor tenants: 3
- Floors: 1
- Parking: Outdoor
- Public transit: STM Bus Routes 180 and 365

Galeries Normandie is a small indoor shopping mall located in the Ahuntsic-Cartierville borough of Montreal, Quebec, Canada on the corner of De Salaberry Ave. and Quebec Autoroute 15. The major anchors are IGA Extra, Rossy and Bureau En Gros. Within the mall, there are standalone McDonald's, SAQ and Tim Hortons/Thai Express buildings.

Galeries Normandie began on August 22, 1961, as a 210,000 square feet L-shaped shopping centre bordered by the supermarkets Steinberg and Dominion Stores. Its largest anchor was the Pascal located at the junction of the shopping centre's L. Other stores at inauguration included Woolworth, Zellers, Greenberg.

On July 13, 1981, the Dominion store in this mall became Provigo. Pascal went bankrupted on May 16, 1991. Pascal's location was converted between mall space and Rossy, even though Pascal had a second floor (now office spaces). In 1990/91, the Steinberg became Xtra, the new discount supermarket division for the group. By 1992, Xtra was converted to IGA when Steinberg went bankrupt. Loblaws acquired Provigo in 1998, and Provigo closed in 2007. Provigo's vacant space became Baron Sports for a little while until the IGA moved to the former Provigo space and expanded the space to become the current IGA Extra. Later on, the former Steinberg store was divided to both a Bureau En Gros and Pharmaprix (which can only be accessed outdoor). By 2011, Blockbuster closed down.

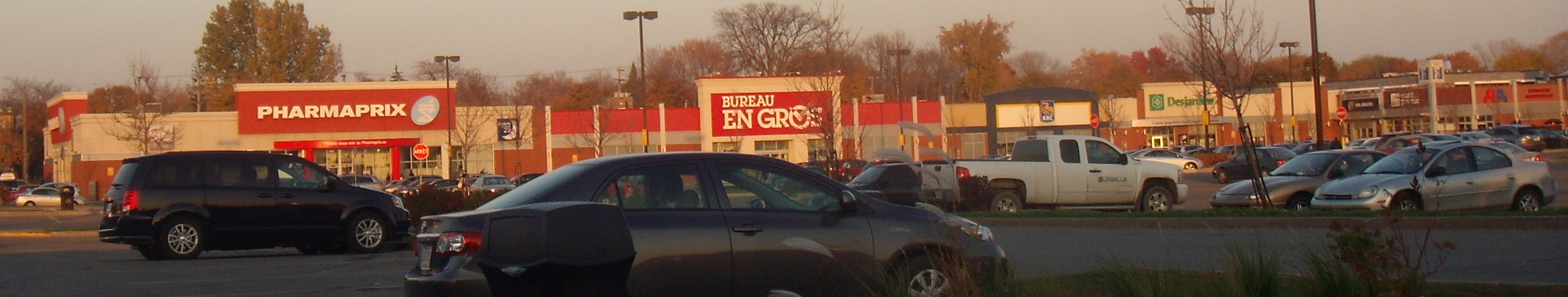
Galeries de Normandie

=== Galeries Saint-Laurent ===
Galeries Saint-Laurent is a small indoor shopping centre located on Marcel-Laurin Blvd, north of Côte-Vertu Blvd., in the Bois-Franc neighbourhood of St. Laurent. Some of its tenants include Giant Tiger, Dollarama, Jean Coutu, SAQ and Bank of Montreal. It opened on October 31, 1973, with 60 stores anchored by Horizon, Zellers and a Dominion supermarket. It was built on land formerly owned by Canadair.

=== Méga Centre Côte-Vertu ===
Méga Centre Côte-Vertu is a power centre located in Montreal, Quebec's St. Laurent borough at the corner of Côte-Vertu Blvd. and Bégin Street. The main anchors are Rona L'entrepôt, Michaels, Bureau En Gros, Jysk and Walmart.

The mall began in the Spring 1973 as Le Bazar, an enclosed mall, with exactly 50 stores. Original anchors were Steinberg, Woolco, as well as a Pascal furniture store that had opened before the others in 1972.

In the 1990s, it also housed a Toys "R" Us store. During the 2000s, the indoor mall format and Le Bazar name were both retired. Previously, there was also a Bikini Village warehouse, a Future Shop and an Economax in the shopping centre.

Le Bazar had Canada's first Club Price in 1986. It had replaced the former Woolco store.

=== Norgate ===
Norgate
- Galeries Norgate
- Location: Saint-Laurent, Montreal, Quebec
- Coordinates: 45.5157°N 73.6837°W
- Address: 1179 Rue Décarie
- Opened: December 6, 1950
- Architect: Max Kalman
- Num. of stores: 12
- Num. of anchor tenants: 2
- Floors: 1
- Parking: outdoor
- Public transit: at Côte-Vertu station Terminus Côte-Vertu

Norgate shopping centre (French: Galeries Norgate) is a strip mall in Saint-Laurent, Quebec. It was designed by architect Max Kalman and built in 1949. It opened on December 6, 1950. It is the oldest shopping centre in Montreal. It is also one of the first major shopping centres in the province and the oldest strip mall in the country. It inaugurated with more than 15 tenants and parking space for 750 cars.

Norgate was expanded in 1956 and houses were built directly north of the shopping centre to form a residential district, known as Les Habitations Norgate, that was eventually renovated in the 1970s. The 1956 extension can be recognized today as the two southernmost tenant spaces occupied by the Pharmaprix drug store and the Cité Santé Saint-Laurent medical clinic. Back then, the expansion had brought a Zellers store which was located where Pharmaprix is now.

On March 10, 2008, the anchor tenant, Provigo supermarket, suffered a partial roof collapse due to the weight of snow from the intense snowfall occurring from March 8 through March 10.

Norgate is located between Décarie Boulevard and Saint-Germain Street as well as between rue Rochon and Côte-Vertu Boulevard. The shopping centre is L-shaped, fronting the street at the bottom of the L and its related short-side. The bottom of the L coincides with rue Rochon, the short side of the bottom and the long leg of the L correspond with Décarie. The long part of the L sits in the middle of the parking lot, with loading docks along the back, and parking spaces all around, running parallel to Décarie. The back and front of the L open onto parking lots. Across Décarie Boulevard from Norgate lies the Côte-Vertu Metro station and Terminus Côte-Vertu.

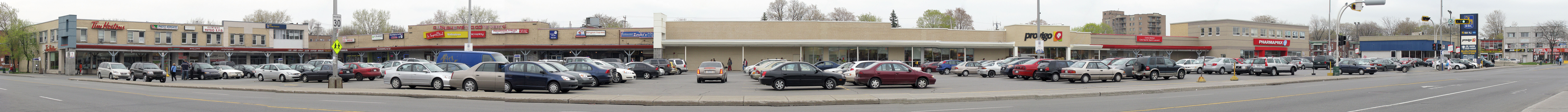
Panoramic view of the Norgate shopping centre, looking eastward from the west side of Décarie Boulevard. From left to right: Tim Hortons, Pizza Planete, Photo Norgate, Safir Bakery (now closed), Clinique Physio R.P.G., RBC Groupe Financier, Fredco Shoes, old shops, grocery store, Buanderie Hi-Tec, Le SuperClub Vidéotron, Poissonnerie Norgate, Voyages Décarie, Bangkok Express, Centre Médical Cité Santé Saint-Laurent, Restaurant Zouki's (now closed), Provigo, Excel Personnel, BaoTax Accountant, Pharmaprix, and a driving school.

=== Place Bourassa ===
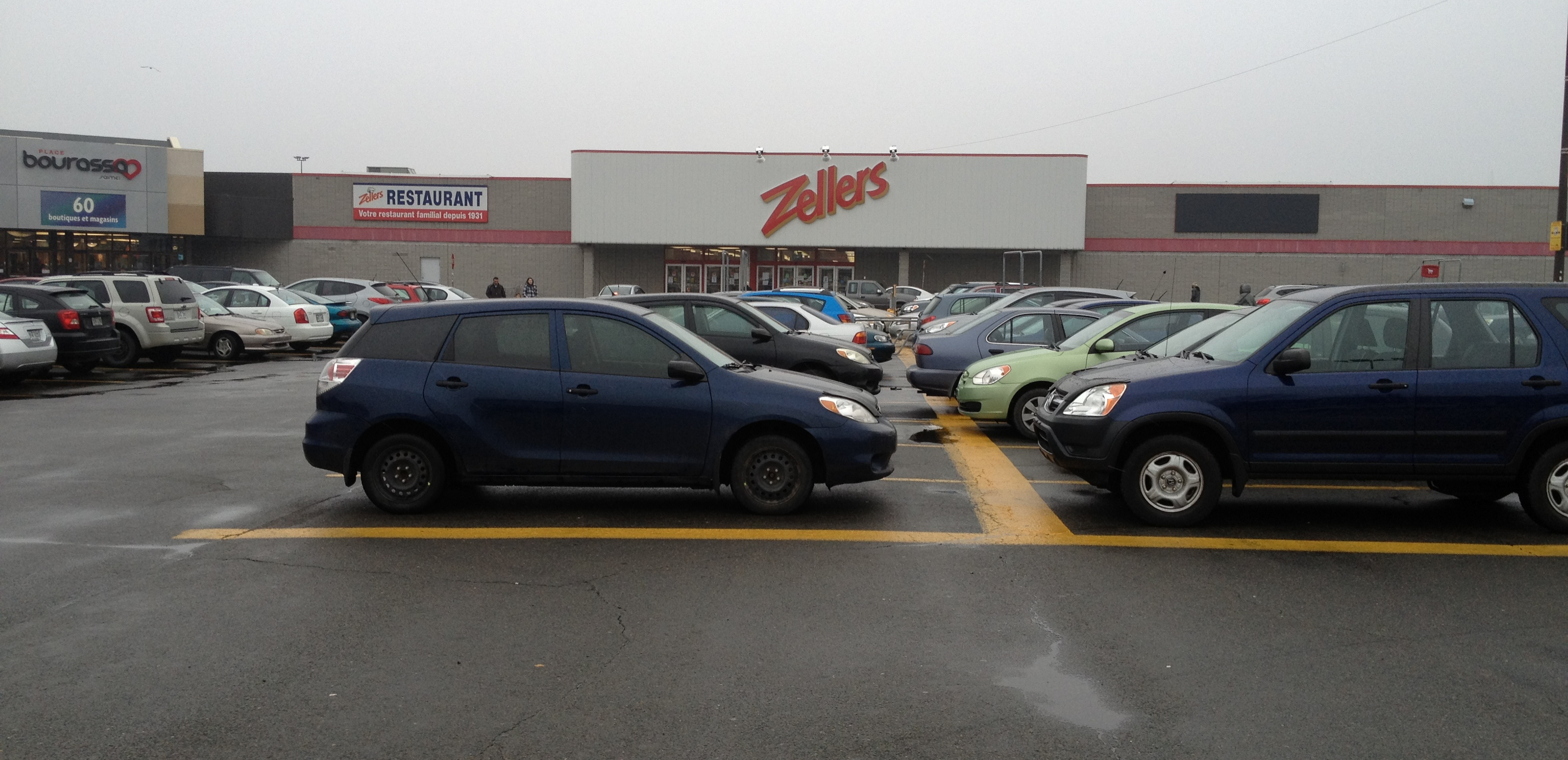
The Zellers at Place Bourassa was the retailer's last location in Quebec by the time it closed in 2014. The store had been in operation since 1971.

Place Bourassa is a small indoor shopping centre located in the borough of Montréal-Nord, Montreal, at the corner of Lacordaire Boulevard and Henri Bourassa Boulevard. The mall has 54 stores, with 265,732-square-foot (24,687.3 m^{2}) and its anchor tenants are Super C and Canadian Tire.

Place Bourassa opened in 1966 with tenants such as a Steinberg, Hart and The Royal Bank of Canada. It inaugurated as an enclosed shopping mall from the start. Place Bourassa was expanded in the spring of 1971, anchored by Steinberg's and Zellers.

When the Steinberg supermarket company went out of business in 1992, the store was sold to Metro and by 1997, the Metro store was converted to its sister chain Super C.

During the January 1998 North American ice storm, at least 25% of the roof of the Zellers store collapsed. As a result, Zellers announced it would temporarily close 12 of its stores in the province for inspection and roof de-icing. The administrators of Place Bourassa closed as well the entire shopping mall for inspection due to the Zellers collapse.

Ivanhoe and its descendant Ivanhoe Cambridge owned and managed the mall from its construction in 1966 to 2006. The mall is currently owned and managed by SmartCentres.

The Zellers store closed in 2014 is now a Canadian Tire.

=== Place LaSalle ===
Place LaSalle
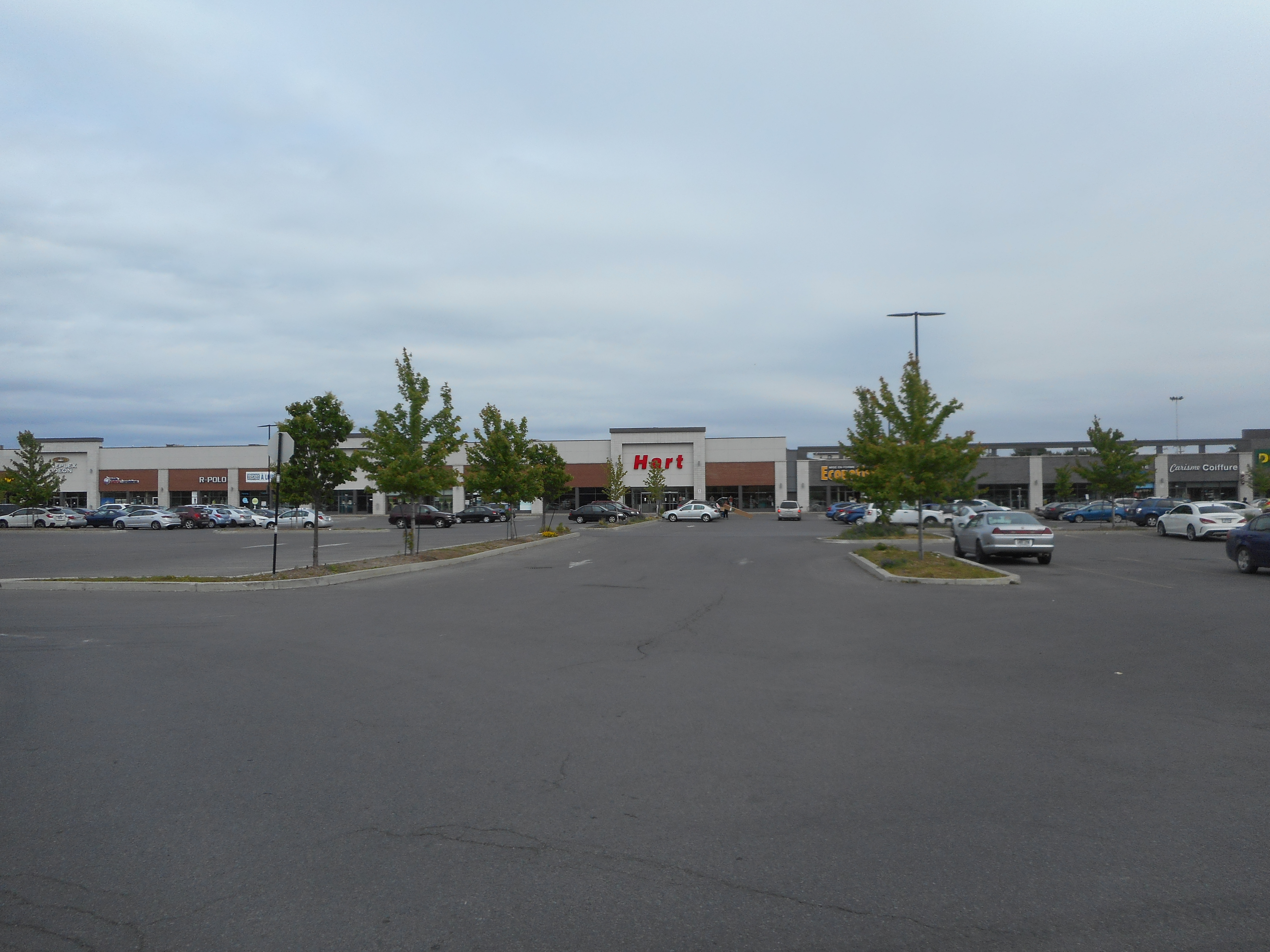
- Location: LaSalle, Quebec, Canada
- Address: 7852 Boul. Champlain
- Opened: 1964
- Num. of anchor tenants: 2
- Floors: 1
- Parking: Outdoor

Place LaSalle is a strip mall located in the LaSalle borough of Montreal, Quebec, Canada. The major anchors are Super C, Hart, and to a lesser extent, Pharmaprix.

Place LaSalle was opened in the 1960s with a Steinberg, Miracle Mart and Greenberg as the main anchors. There was also an outparcel that was home to a Fina Service Centre (this would later become McDonald's and Yellow Shoes). Along with the now-defunct Centre Le Cavalier, Place LaSalle was one of the first indoor malls in LaSalle.

Initially the mall was built as a 2 store unit (Miracle Mart and Steinbergs) with a Fina service centre outparcel (later McDonald's); the mall was added shortly after with a section going from the end of Miracle Mart towards Gagné street. In the early 1980s, the mall was extended towards the Steinberg store (Steinberg only gained mall access with this renovation). There was an attempt in 1988 to modernize the mall due to competition from other malls. This included a new entrance facing Champlain leading to an attempt at creating a food court. Around this time the former Greenberg space became Géant des Aubaines (it later became Dollarama).

In April 1987, Miracle Mart was renamed as M. In 1991, in an effort to compete with Maxi, Héritage and Super C, the Steinberg was converted to Sélex, a discount supermarket. By 1992, when the Steinberg group went bankrupt, Sélex became a Metro, and the M store was closed. In 1994, a 12-screen Cineplex Odeon and a GoCart track took over the lease of M. In the early 2000s, Hart replaced the GoCart track. Somewhat around the mid/late-2000s, the Metro store was converted as a Metro Plus. In May 2010, Metro Plus was converted to Super C and Pharmaprix was relocated to a standalone building, joining the McDonald's (which has since been demolished and rebuilt due to the classic look of the building), Tim Hortons and SAQ buildings. In November 2020, the Cineplex Odeon theater closed.

Since then, the mall has started to experience such a decline, making Place LaSalle a dead mall due to increased competition up against larger rival Carrefour Angrignon and smaller rival Place Newman. To ensure its death, lease renewals were refused by management, in favour of dividing the land between condominiums and the more profitable outdoor mall concept. In mid-October 2011, a National Bank of Canada opened next to the SAQ. Place LaSalle is currently under heavy renovation, but is still open. The new mall should open in the winter.

In 2011, Arcade Fire filmed parts of their music video for "Sprawl II" inside Place LaSalle and its parking lot.

=== Place Newman ===
Place Newman
- Location: LaSalle, Quebec
- Address: 2101 Dollard
- Opened: 1971
- Developer: Ivanhoe Corporation
- Manager: RioCan
- Owner: RioCan
- Num. of anchor tenants: 3 (Maxi, Rossy & Winners)
- Floors: 1
- Parking: Outdoor

Place Newman is a small indoor shopping mall located in the LaSalle borough of Montreal, Quebec, Canada on Dollard Ave. corner Newman Blvd. The major tenants are Maxi, Rossy, Bouclair Maison, Dollarama, and Winners. There is a standalone Wendy's restaurant location.

Built in 1971 by Ivanhoe Corporation, roughly at the same time as Galeries Lachine, it was sold in September 2002 to RioCan. Place Newman's anchors from 1971 until 1992 were Steinberg and Zellers; the former went bankrupt in 1992 and the latter closed its Place Newman store circa 2001.

In mid-1992, Steinberg's became Provigo, which would in turn be converted into Maxi in late 1992. The store was remodelled, making the supermarket have an outdoor entrance for the first time in this mall.

The anchor space of Zellers was dismantled and is now the home of Rossy, Au Vieux Duluth and a few others.

Schools near by Place Newman are Saint Lawrence Academy Junior/Senior and Children's World.

=== Place Viau ===
Place Viau
- Location: Saint-Léonard, Quebec
- Address: 7640 Boulevard Viau
- Opened: September 7, 2015
- Developer: First Capital REIT
- Manager: First Capital REIT
- Owner: First Capital REIT
- Num. of stores: 22
- Num. of anchor tenants: 4 (Walmart, Dollarama, Michaels and Marshalls)
- Floor area: 650,000 sq.ft.
- Floors: 3
- Parking: 2 levels (Indoor and Outdoor)
- Public transit: STM Bus: 136, 188 and 460

Place Viau is a new multi-level open-air shopping centre on top of a building that includes a Walmart store and other retail/commercial space, all connected with convenient pedestrian and vehicular access, vertical transportation and surface and covered parking. Other big tenants include Marshalls, Michaels and Dollarama. The mall was built in 2012, after an existing strip mall housing a Zellers, which was also called Place Viau, was demolished.

=== Plaza Côte-des-Neiges ===
Plaza Côte-Des-Neiges
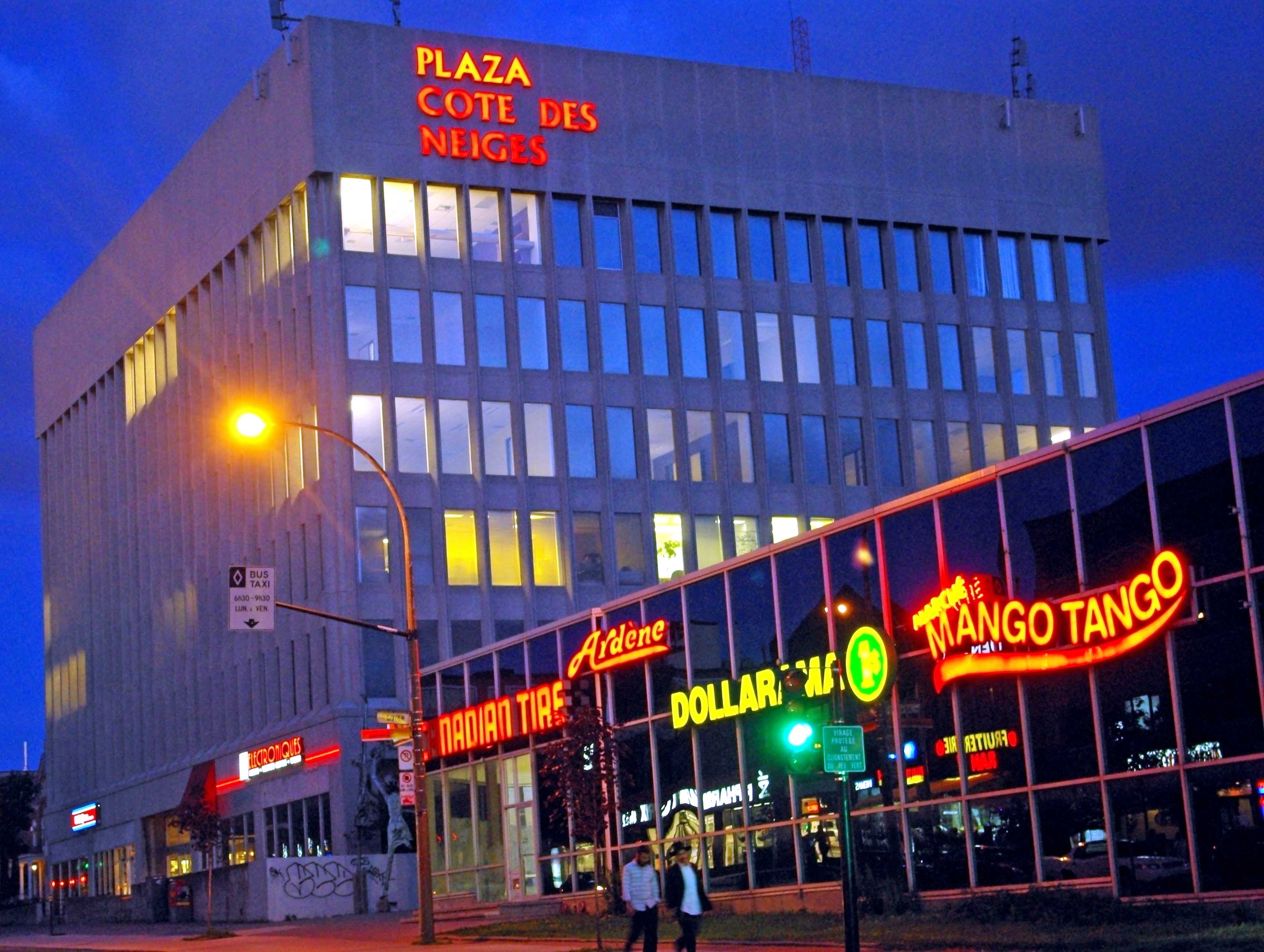
- Part of Plaza Côte-des-Neiges in Montreal, as seen at night
- Coordinates: 45.502061°N 73.637967°W
- Address: 6700, chemin de la Côte-des-Neiges, Montreal, Quebec, Canada
- Opened: October 3, 1968
- Owner: Gestion Plaza Côte-Des-Neiges
- Num. of stores: 70
- Num. of anchor tenants: 5 (Ciné Starz, Canadian Tire, Marché Fu Tai, Walmart, Giant Tiger)
- Floors: 3 (excluding highrise building)
- Parking: Indoor & outdoor
- Public transit: at Plamondon station STM Bus: 160, 165, 369 and 465
- Website: www.plazacdn.com/en

Plaza Côte-des-Neiges is a mid-size two stories indoor mall located in the Côte-des-Neiges–Notre-Dame-de-Grâce borough of Montreal, Quebec, Canada. It is operated by Gestion Plaza Côte-des-Neiges. The Plaza has space for over 100 stores. They include a medical clinic, a dental clinic, daycare centre, a movie theatre, restaurants and many small independent businesses. The plaza was officially opened on October 3, 1968, with 68 stores anchored by Miracle Mart, Steinberg's and Wise.

In October 1985, Plaza Côte-des-Neiges announced an expansion to add 46 more stores and a Canadian Tire. The mall owner had to reacquire the lease of Miracle Mart in order to find the necessary space for the expansion. Miracle Mart left in June 1985.

Zellers opened a new store at Plaza Côte-des-Neiges on August 10, 1991. A Cineplex Odeon opened the same month on August 29, 1991. 20 years later, Walmart Canada acquired the lease from Zellers to open its own store in October 2012. Like Canadian Tire, Dollarama, Marché Fu Tai or any other store at Plaza Côte-des-Neiges, Walmart has no outdoor entrance and can only accessed from inside the mall.

As of April 1, 2023, a new Giant Tiger store has opened in the mall, which also features a new row of escalators right beside it.

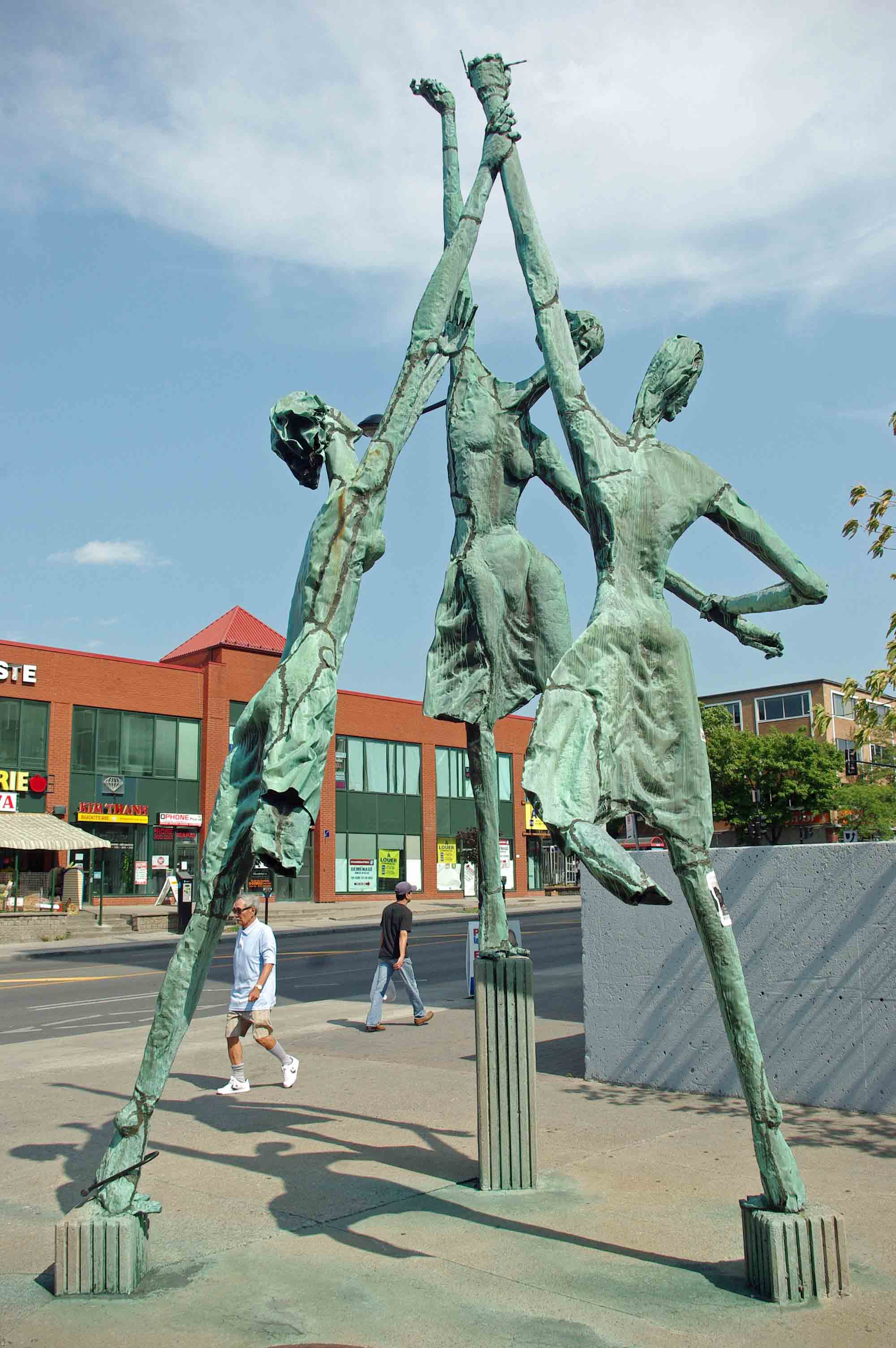
Hans Schleeh's Trialogue near the front entrance of Plaza Côte-des-Neiges

=== Van Horne ===
Centre Commercial Van Horne is a strip mall located in the Côte-des-Neiges borough next to the Plamondon metro station. The shopping centre was built by Steinberg in 1955. Due to its small size, it never transitioned into an indoor shopping centre as did most Ivanhoe strip malls in the 1960s and 1970s such as Dorval Gardens, Wilderton, Place Sainte-Foy or St-Martin in Laval. Despite its size and generic layout, it is considered a strong shopping centre even today. It was home to a popular Jewish delicatessen Brown Derby (closed in 2000) that has since been replaced by the equally busy Tim Hortons. Steinberg rebranded as IGA in 1992.

It was sold in January 2002 to First Capital Realty by Ivanhoé Cambridge.

=== Village Champlain ===
Village Champlain is located in the borough of Mercier–Hochelaga-Maisonneuve, Montreal, at the corner of Sherbrooke Street East and Honoré-Beaugrand, adjacent to the Honoré-Beaugrand station. The centre is located in the eponymous Village Champlain neighborhood; a primarily residential area bordered by Sherbrooke, Liébert, Hochelaga and De Boucherville streets. Even though it is a generic strip mall with fewer than 20 tenants, Village Champlain is notable for being one of the oldest shopping centres in Montreal, second only to Norgate.

The shopping centre opened to the public on September 15, 1953 though its formal inauguration occurred on September 22. Anchor stores upon inauguration were Steinberg and Woolworth for a total of 18 tenants sprawled over 150,000 square feet. Its inauguration ceremony had been attended by high-profile business and political figures including Montreal mayor Camillien Houde and MP Marcel Monette, and the shopping centre could serve a population of up to 22,000 families at its opening and 500 cars in its parking lot. Today it includes well-known contemporary tenants like Jean Coutu, St-Hubert, Subway, Provi-Soir, M&M Food Market, Bulk Barn and a Toronto Dominion Bank that has been there since 1953 (when it was still The Dominion Bank). The former spaces of Steinberg and Woolworth are now occupied respectively by a Dollar Max variety store and a Bulk Barn.

=== Village Montpellier ===
Village Montpellier, also known as Centre commercial Place Montpellier, is located at 740 Côte-Vertu Ouest boulevard. It is a small neighborhood indoor mall located in the Ville Saint-Laurent borough. The biggest tenants are a Metro Plus super market and Jean Coutu pharmacy. It is currently managed by Développement Métro.

=== Wilderton ===
Centre commercial Wilderton is a small indoor mall in the Côte-des-Neiges borough and bordering Outremont. It is located on Van Horne Avenue between Wilderton and Darlington Avenues. Its anchors are Metro, Dollarama and Pharmaprix.

Wilderton was built by Steinberg through Ivanhoe. Its construction began in mid-December 1959 and it officially opened on September 7, 1960.

In 1970, Wilderton was converted from a strip mall to an indoor one. Steinberg rebranded as Metro in 1992. The mall was acquired by First Capital Realty in 2002.

Redevelopment

In 2016, First Capital announced plans to demolish the property and redeveloped it into a mixed-use residential and commercial project. The new complex will continue with the Wilderton namesake.

The western portion of the mall, which housed the Metro grocery store and the Royal Bank, was demolished circa 2019. As part of the first phase of Wilderton's transformation, a brand new building was built on the mall's parking for the Royal Bank, Tim Hortons and several other tenants. Another two-story building is currently under construction for Metro, Pharmaprix, SAQ, and residences for seniors.

As of 2021, the eastern part of the old shopping mall is still standing with all of its tenants.

== Pointe-Claire ==
=== Centre Terrarium ===
Centre Terrarium (formerly Terrarium Pointe-Claire until 1997) is as strip mall with two sections located in Pointe-Claire, Quebec. It is currently owned by SmartCentres. Popular stores include Walmart, The Home Depot, Domino's Pizza, L'Equipeur, Tim Hortons, Pier 1 Imports, Pennington's and Subway. It also houses a free-standing TD Canada Trust.

The mall began in the 1970s with a Kmart, a CIBC and a Dominion supermarket (which pulled out of the mall in 1983 even though the space had remained empty until Famous Players moved to that space). It was Pointe-Claire's third-largest indoor shopping mall behind Fairview Pointe-Claire and Plaza Pointe-Claire until the indoor space was converted to sports stores in 2005.

In October 1983, Kmart announced that it would close all of its stores in the Montreal area for January 28, 1984 including Ponte-Claire's. In April 1984, it was reported that a Zellers department store would "open shortly in a location vacated by a competitor in the Montreal suburb of Pointe-Claire". On October 31, 1984, the Zellers store opened. It was the first Zellers store to sell fur coats. In August 2000, the store was enlarged from 66,000 square feet to 110,000 square feet.

When it was an indoor shopping mall, most stores, such as Domino's Pizza and CIBC were moved to Complexe Pointe-Claire or other nearby locations. Other tenants such as Famous Players, L'Île du Dollar, Coiffure Maxicolor and Talons were closed in the indoor mall.

Around 2010, Bernard Trottier Sports closed down, and Dollarama took its vacant space the following year. The Zellers store closed in 2013 and Target took over its space. The Target store closed in 2015, and Walmart took over its space in 2016.

In October 2024, Addison Electronique took over the space previously used by Baron Sports.

=== Complexe Pointe-Claire ===
Complexe Pointe-Claire
- Location: Pointe-Claire, Quebec, Canada
- Coordinates: 45.4668°N 73.8251°W
- Opened: 1987
- Owner: Westcliff
- Num. of anchor tenants: 4
- Floors: 1
- Parking: Outdoor
- Public transit: STM Bus: 200, 202, 203, 204, 208, 215, 225, 382, 419

Complexe Pointe-Claire is one of the West Island's largest strip malls, located in Pointe-Claire, Quebec, Canada, on Saint-Jean Boulevard at the Quebec Autoroute 40. Owned by Westcliff, the major anchors of this mall are Maxi & Cie, Marshalls and Indigo. Restaurants are Subway, La Cage – Brasserie sportive, Sushi Shop and Le Chocolat Belge, as well as a McKibbins pub to name a few.

The mall opened in 1987 with Maxi, Litrerie Etc. and Toys "R" Us as anchors. Toys "R" Us actually opened before the shopping centre in October 1986.

A six-screen Cineplex Odeon theatre opened in 1988. By 1995, Litrerie Etc. and Consumers Distributing were both closed. Future Shop and Globo Shoes shortly took over the former spots. The following year, Red Lobster (which withdrew from Quebec at the time) and the National Bank of Canada were closed; the latter would reappear during the time when Maxi & Cie replaced Maxi in 1997. The Nature Pet Centre was relocated to Red Lobster's old location; welcoming the old Nature Pet Centre site to house the Chapters bookstore, which is now an Indigo bookstore. A Dic Ann's restaurant operated within the mall, but closed down in 1999. The former Dic Ann's space is now Reitmans, which also occupies the former space of the National Bank.

Around 2002, CIBC and the Nature Pet Centre replaced the old Cineplex Odeon site (which closed in 2001); causing closure of the National Bank inside the Maxi & Cie store and the current Nature Pet Centre entrance was where it housed Dollar ou Deux. The old Nature Pet Centre location became a J. Schreters store, which also in turn, closed.

Today, Addition Elle is located at the former Red Lobster site. Cohoes went bankrupt in 2005, and that store had been there since the mall's inception. A McKibbins takes the former Cohoes space.

Best Buy closed the Future Shop in 2015.

In March 2025, the Toys "R" Us store closed. As well, the Nature Pet store moved to the Mega Centre des Sources shopping centre.

=== Plaza Pointe-Claire ===
Plaza Pointe-Claire is an indoor shopping centre in Pointe-Claire, Quebec (a suburb of Montreal). It is located on 269 St. Jean Boulevard near Autoroute 20. Tenant stores include Metro, Uniprix, TD Canada Trust, SAQ and Swiss Vienna Patisserie. Most stores are independently operated. The mall has a number of longstanding tenants including Ted's Hobby Shop, Blue Nose Collectibles, Vienna Pastry, Librairie Clio and Conservatoire de Musique.

Its first anchor store Steinberg's supermarket opened its doors on September 19, 1957. After the rest of the mall was completed, the inauguration was held on October 16, 1958. The mall was originally known simply as the Pointe-Claire shopping centre. Although many of the stores were independent businesseses, the shopping centre also had its share of national retailers including Woolworth and Reitmans. Plaza Pointe-Claire was initially managed by Ivanhoe Corporation. Among the small notable tenants to this mall was the Steve's hardware and variety store which opened in May 1983 and operated for 40 years until its owners decided in late 2022 to close the business for an unspecified date.

In 1976, Plaza Pointe-Claire was purchased by Kurt Scheunert and his partner who since added a new wing to the shopping centre. Scheunert still co-owns the shopping centre as of 2023.

== See also ==
- List of shopping malls in Montreal
- List of shopping malls in Greater Longueuil
- List of largest shopping malls in Canada
