= Collège Français =

Collège Français can refer to:

== Schools ==
- Collège Français (Longueuil), a private French-language secondary school and primary school in Longueuil, Quebec, Canada
- Collège Français (Montreal), a private French-language secondary school in Montreal, Quebec, Canada
- Le Collège français, a public French-language high school in Toronto, Ontario, Canada

== Sports teams ==
- Longueuil Collège Français, Quebec Junior AAA Hockey League based in Longueuil, Quebec, Canada
- Longueuil Collège Français (QMJHL), defunct Quebec Major Junior Hockey League team that 1989 to 1991
- Verdun Collège Français, Quebec Major Junior Hockey League team based in Verdun, Montreal, Quebec, Canada
