= Curse of Aurore =

2020 Horror Movie

- Official release poster
- Directed by: Mehran C. Torgoley
- Written by: Llana Barron; Mehran C. Torgoley
- Produced by: Llana Barron; Mehran C. Torgoley; Minna Brighton; Kevin Pardo
- Starring: Llana Barron; Lex Wilson; Jordan Kaplan
- Edited by: Mehran C. Torgoley
- Music by: Llana Barron
- Production company: Cult Cinema Productions
- Distributed by: Cinémas Guzzo; Freestyle Digital Media
- Release dates: July 24, 2020 (Québec, Canada); January 12, 2021 (USA/Worldwide)
- Running time: 90 minutes
- Country: USA
- Languages: English & French

Curse of Aurore is a 2020 American horror film written by Llana Barron & Mehran C. Torgoley, and directed by Mehran C. Torgoley. It is presented as found footage on a USB flash drive found in a dark web mystery box that was sent to popular YouTuber, Casey Nolan of Mindseed TV.

Curse of Aurore initially premiered in Québec, Canada with a limited theatrical release in the Cinémas Guzzo theaters on July 24, 2020. The film was later released to major streaming platforms in the United States by Freestyle Digital Media on January 12, 2021.

== Plot ==
A YouTube livestream by Casey Nolan shows him unboxing a mystery box acquired through the Dark Web. Digging through an assortment of macabre artifacts that seem to be from a crime scene, Casey uncovers a USB flash drive containing video files which he proceeds to play.

The footage shows two men, Aaron and Kevin, arriving at an airport in Quebec and welcomed by their partner Lena. On the drive to Lena's family cottage, Lena tells the local story of Aurore Gagnon, a girl abused and murdered by her parents in the 1920s. At a roadside restaurant, Lena introduces Aaron and Kevin to poutine. They discuss their lives and Lena’s recent breakup, not noticing odd looks from the locals.

At the cottage, as Lena gives the two a tour, an apparition appear behind them. Over dinner, they decide Aurore’s tragedy could be a good story to research further. That night, while the group is hanging out in the living room, the upstairs hatch door mysteriously slams shut. Later, Lena sees people entering a neighbor’s house, chanting as they join some sort of ritual gathering.

The filmmakers explore Aurore’s hometown of Fortierville, including the local church and graveyard. The priest refuses to let them film at the church. At Aurore’s gravesite, they run into Lena’s old friend Chantal. Chantal explains that her uncle lives in Aurore’s childhood home and offers to arrange a tour. As they spend more time in the remote town, the filmmakers have strange experiences that blur the line between reality and the supernatural.

One night while driving, Lena insists she sees Aurore’s ghost in the road, causing them to crash. With the car stuck in a snowy ditch, they walk to a farmhouse and meet the eccentric local couple Benoit and Blanche. Blanche is a spiritualist, and while doing a tarot card reading for Lena, ominously pulls three death cards - a nearly impossible occurrence. Benoit helps tow their car back onto the road. On the drive back, Kevin reveals he stole Blanche’s occult book, Languages of the Dead, enraging the others. Arguments over creative differences and romantic tension rise. Despite the creepy events and conflicts, the three commit to sticking it out to finish researching their film.

The next night, the trio checks out a haunted streetlight flicker. Lena and Kevin smoke a joint and lie on the frozen street waiting for the flicker. Kevin inexplicably passes out just as a car comes screaming towards them. Lena and Aaron barely manage to drag him to safety.

At Aurore’s house, Chantal’s uncle Mr. Gagnon (who only speaks French), gives them a tour and explains that they keep Aurore’s room locked with a rosary and crucifix around the doorknob to contain evil forces. At the end of the tour, Kevin breaks the crucifix off her door, infuriating Mr. Gagnon who throws them out.

That night, Lena and Kevin spot paranormal occurrences in their recorded footages. They decide to just document their lives in the moment, rather than following a script. They hold a seance in the basement using the stolen book and crucifix. Aaron reluctantly films but nothing happens until smoke from burnt pizza triggers the smoke alarm. Suddenly, the house shakes violently. Cabinets fling open and a wine glass flies across the room. Blanche arrives to survey the damage but flees in fear when Kevin reveals new scratches and collapses writhing in pain. Bloody scratches rise from his stomach right before their eyes.

They find chanting townspeople outside and Kevin goes missing. Following Kevin’s screams, they arrive at a large barn where they discover a ritualistic ceremony. They see Aurore’s uncle bound on a makeshift altar and Kevin's decapitated body hanging in a barn. Surrounded by chanting villagers, Lena and Aaron beg for their lives before being knocked out as the video ends.

Casey Nolan ends his YouTube video by stating that he’s turning the evidence over to the authorities and encourages his viewers to reach out if they have any further information on the tragedy they all just witnessed.

== Cast ==
- Llana Barron as Lena
- Lex Wilson as Aaron
- Jordan Kaplan as Kevin
- Agathe Salzmann as Chantal
- Roxane Delisle as Blanche
- Mike D. Smith as Mr. Gagnon
- David Robert Donatucci as Benoit
- Casey Nolan as Himself

== Release ==
In July 2020, Curse of Aurore was initially acquired in Québec, Canada by Vincenzo Guzzo and & distributed at his personal theater chain, Cinémas Guzzo. He placed the film in 9 Mega-Plex locations, as well as, 4 independent theaters owned by Ciné Entreprise. Since Québec is a heavily French-speaking region of Canada, the film was played on multiple screens within the same theater location (one with French subtitles and one without). It was also marketed and screened with the alternative English title Pærish: The Curse of Aurore Gagnon & coinciding French title La Malédiction D'Aurore Gagnon.

On opening weekend, the film reached #1 overall in the box office for all Cinémas Guzzo Theaters and #4 overall for the entire province of Québec. The film maintained the #1 overall spot at Cinémas Guzzo in its 2nd & 3rd weeks, while maintaining Top 10 placement in Québec. Curse of Aurore's limited theatrical release lasted for 10 consecutive weeks before moving on to the Cinémas Guzzo Streaming platform.

Freestyle Digital Media acquired Curse of Aurore in January 2021 and distributed worldwide on major streaming platforms such as Amazon Prime Video, Tubi, and The Roku Channel. It is also available for rent on iTunes, Google Play, Vudu, YouTube Movies, Microsoft Store, PlayStation Store, and Xbox Store.

== Reception ==
=== Critical response ===
Mary Beth McAndrews of Dread Central said the film features "one of the best ensemble casts I've seen in the subgenre", and included the film on her Top Ten "Terrifying Found Footage Movies Available to Watch on Prime Video". Christine Burnham from PopHorror wrote, "I have to say I really loved this film. There were some genuine moments of creepy terror in it. The location of rural Canada was perfect, and I loved the weirdly religious overtones that were reeking out of the entire town". She also stated that "the acting is terrific" and that Curse of Aurore is "a film found footage fans should not miss". LAZombieGirl from The Blood-Shed thought that "Curse of Aurore manages to be different in a genre full of the same old tired tropes. Meta, funny and yet scary as hell, this film has gotten my attention and is listed as one of the most anticipated films of 2021. With an engaging, entertaining cast that truly clicks with each other and some cool SFX, this is a solid and chilling horror film".

Curse of Aurore also received international recognition. Torgeir Blok from CINEMA, Norway's oldest film magazine, commended the film by stating that it "...achieves a certain authenticity and feeling that the dialogue is improvised...This chemistry [between characters] really paid off, and also earned Barron the Ravenheart Award for Best Actress".

=== Accolades ===
Year	Award	Category	Recipient	Result	Ref(s)
2022	Unnamed Footage Festival	Jury Award for Best Cast	Curse of Aurore	Won	
2022	Ravenheart International Film Festival	Best Actress	Llana Barron	Won	
2022	Yellow Fever Indie Film Festival	Best Horror Film	Curse of Aurore	Nominated	
2022	Los Angeles Crime and Horror Film Festival	Best Picture	Curse of Aurore	Nominated	
2022	Shockfest Film Festival	Best Feature	Curse of Aurore	Nominated	

Curse of Aurore was also an "Official Selection" at the following film festivals in 2022:

- A Night of Horror International Film Festival in Sydney, Australia
- Blood in the Snow Canadian Film Festival in Toronto, Canada
- The Great Canadian Horror Film Festival in Toronto, Canada

== See also ==
- Little Aurore's Tragedy
- Aurore
