= Mehran C. Torgoley =

American film director, screenwriter, and producer

- Torgoley on That Prop Culture Show
- Occupations: Film Director; Screenwriter; Producer; Editor
- Years active: 2008–present

Mehran C. Torgoley is an American film director, screenwriter, producer, and editor. He is best known for his work on the found footage horror film Curse of Aurore (2020) and the absurd mockumentary comedy film Izzy Lyon: The Unspun Truth (2022).

== Life and career ==
Mehran grew up in Chicago, Illinois. He originally worked in graphic design for multiple video game companies, such as Double Helix Games, Shiny Entertainment, and most notably Midway Games.

Mehran's debut feature film, Curse of Aurore, under the production company, Cult Cinema Productions, premiered in Quebec, Canada at all Cinémas Guzzo Theaters on July 24, 2020. On opening weekend, Curse of Aurore hit #1 in the box office throughout all Cinémas Guzzo Theaters and #4 overall in the entire province of Québec. The film enjoyed a successful 10-week limited theatrical run. Curse of Aurore was then acquired by Freestyle Digital Media and released worldwide on January 12, 2021.

Mehran's second feature film, Izzy Lyon: The Unspun Truth, was distributed by Octane Multimedia for digital release on November 4, 2022. The film starred many well known comedic actors such as Phil Lamarr, David Koechner, Bruce Baum, Kim Whitley, Greg Proops, Jeff Bryan Davis, and Rick Overton.

Mehran's third feature film Behold!, under the production company, Cult Cinema Productions, was acquired by the indie film distribution company, Indie Rights, in 2025 and is currently available to rent/buy on Amazon Prime Video and streaming for free on Tubi.

Mehran's fourth feature film, Golden, under his newly formed production company, Wicker Park Pictures, had its United States Premiere at the 2026 New York City Independent Film Festival. Lead actress, Leah Eckardt, won the Best Actress in a Narrative Feature Film.

== Filmography ==
Year	Film					
Year	Film	Director	Writer	Producer	Editor	Notes
2010	Room Enough	Yes	Yes	Yes	Yes	Short Film; Inspired by the short story "That's Not Me" by Issac Marion
2013	Run	Yes	Yes	Yes	Yes	Short Film; Cinematographer
2014	Committed	Yes	Yes	Yes	Yes	Short Film; Co-Writer
2020	Curse of Aurore	Yes	Yes	Yes	Yes	Co-Writer
2022	Izzy Lyon: The Unspun Truth	Yes	Yes	Yes	Yes	Co-director & Co-writer
2025	Behold!	Yes	Yes	Yes	Yes	Co-Writer
2026	Golden	Yes	Yes	Yes	Yes	
