= Maxwell M. Kalman =

Canadian architect, real estate developer and philanthropist

- Kalman in 1935
- Born: May 30, 1906; Montreal, Quebec, Canada
- Died: November 27, 2009 (aged 103); Montreal, Quebec
- Occupation: Architect
- Known for: Norgate shopping centre

Maxwell Myron Kalman (May 30, 1906 – November 27, 2009) was a Canadian architect, real estate developer, and philanthropist. He designed over 1,100 commercial, residential, and institutional projects in Quebec before and after World War II. He was noted as the architect of Canada's first shopping centre, the Norgate shopping centre, which opened in Montreal, Quebec in 1949.

== Early life and education ==
Maxwell Kalman was the fourth child of Romanian immigrants to Montreal. His father, Ozias Kalman, worked as a general contractor. From a young age, Maxwell was enamored by the idea of becoming an architect. He graduated from the Baron Byng High School in 1923 and moved to New York City to take architecture courses at Columbia University by night while doing temporary jobs by day. Returning to Montreal, he enrolled at the McGill University School of Architecture in 1927 and graduated in 1931, one of the first Jewish graduates of McGill’s architecture school.

== Career ==
Maxwell M. Kalman's works, collectively an extraordinarily revealing testimony to Montreal's everyday architecture of the prewar and postwar years, never made it into the architectural journals. Yet they were efficient in plan, carefully detailed, up-to-date in construction techniques, appropriate in materials, budget-conscious, and attentive to the needs and tastes of their clients.

–Canadian Architect, 12 June 2006

During his term at McGill, he interned at the major architectural firm of Ross and Macdonald. Although they promised to hire him upon graduation, the company was hard hit by the Great Depression and Kalman was forced to start working on his own, beginning in residential construction and renovations. By the mid-1930s he had developed a reputation for efficiency in design space and budget, and was tapped to draw up plans for many commercial, residential, institutional, and community projects. During World War II he converted a foundry in Joliette into a facility for manufacturing components for "training aircraft and merchant-marine submarine detection" for the Canadian military.

After the war, Kalman partnered with real estate developers while continuing to work for private clients. The postwar years saw him busy designing economically-priced apartments and single-family homes, as well as upscale residential dwellings, to accommodate Montreal's postwar boom. In all, he designed more than 1,100 commercial, residential, and institutional projects.

=== Notable designs ===
Kalman is noted as the architect of Canada's first shopping centre, the Norgate shopping centre, in Saint-Laurent (1949), which was created to service residents of the larger Norgate housing complex, which Kalman also designed. The L-shaped mall and outdoor parking lot featured a line of small stores anchored by several large anchor stores that would draw in business. Kalman's architectural and marketing concept was subsequently applied to the first shopping centre in Ottawa, the Westgate Shopping Centre, and other Montreal commercial centres. The Norgate housing complex was the first project invested in by the Canada Mortgage and Housing Corporation (CMHC) under the National Housing Act.

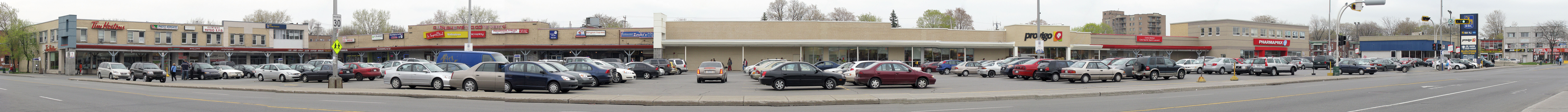
Panoramic view of the Norgate shopping centre

Kalman also designed the Montreal suburb of Lorraine for the CMHC. Other notable projects in Montreal include the art deco-inspired Workmen's Circle Centre (today the Sala Rossa), the Jewish People's School (today the College Français), and the Shelbourne Towers apartment complex (now Appartements Belfort). A number of his residential projects in Montreal have been added to the province's Répertoire du patrimoine culturel du Québec, including Tudor Revival properties located at 2825–2827 and 2789–2797 Willowdale Avenue.

== Centennial retrospective ==
In honor of Kalman's 100th birthday on May 30, 2006, McGill University and the University of Montreal presented a retrospective of his architectural work from the 1930s through early 1960s, together with a recorded interview with the architect. The exhibition traveled to Côte-Saint-Luc for another public viewing from January 30 to May 31, 2007.

== Philanthropy ==
Kalman fund-raised for State of Israel Bonds, the United Jewish Appeal, and Congregation Shaar Hashomayim. He also supported McGill University and the Technion School of Architecture, Hebrew University of Jerusalem, Weizmann Institute of Science, and Bar-Ilan University in Israel.

== Personal life ==
Kalman married twice and had two sons, Lawrence and Harold; Harold D. Kalman is an architectural historian and author in Vancouver, British Columbia. Kalman died of pneumonia on November 27, 2009, in Montreal, aged 103. He was buried at the New Jewish Cemetery in Ottawa.
