= Horizon (store) =

Canadian line of department stores

- Founded: August 16, 1972; 53 years ago in Metro Toronto, Canada
- Defunct: January 1979
- Headquarters: Canada
- Area served: Ontario, Quebec
- Parent: T. Eaton Company

Horizon was a Canadian discount department retailer founded in 1972 by T. Eaton Co. Limited. Attempting to compete with established Canadian brands like Woolco and Zellers during a downturn in the market, it was T. Eaton's attempt to court "buyers", as opposed to the "shoppers" courted at its Eaton's stores. Instead, the chain was generally unprofitable, cannibalizing sales from its sister Eaton's stores, and misplaced, according to analysts. Intended to be a 122-store chain, it only reached 18 locations before closing in 1979, less than seven years after opening. The financial drag of the chain in the 1970s is said to have contributed to T. Eaton's significant financial problems in the 1980s.

== History ==
In The Globe and Mail, T. Eaton Co. Ltd. President Robert Butler observed that consumers could be classified as shoppers and buyers. "Your wife goes out to buy the groceries or a pair of hose or kiddies' underwear, but she goes out to shop for furniture, for interesting gifts, expensive dresses." This insight guided both changes to their main line of stores, but also the creation of Horizon, a discount chain that the company referred to as "convenience stores". It was focused on the "buyer" section of the market.

Stores were to be roughly 60,000 square feet, and either located in neighbourhood malls "or smaller communities often close to a grocery supermarket". The "'fast-moving' lines of merchandise" included clothing, "housewares and notions, sporting goods, small and large appliances and seasonal merchandise". Horizon locations would have centralized check-out counters, versus the in-department desks of the main Eaton's stores.

According to The Globe and Mail, the name Horizon "reflects a forward-looking, contemporary life style—the image these stores will project". This extended to the store's use of a barcode reader at checkout, which received media attention; the store was deemed "the most automated self-service store in Canada". The company also used Eaton's credit cards and computer system, which allowed them to prevent over-spending and keep track of inventory.

Plans for Horizon were first announced in May 1972. The first location was to be in Scarborough, Ontario, opening in August 1972. The earliest stores were meant as a pilot, "to test different types of community". The company planned 122 locations, each intended to have 200,000 people within a ten-minute drive.

While the Scarborough and Yonge-Eglinton locations were successful, the remainder were not, with most locations not adhering to the researched requirements. Stores were launched during a general downturn for discounters. While the company was privately owned, woes surrounding its Horizon stores were publicly known, with the Financial Post claiming sales dipped after the 1972 Christmas season. Stores were cutting into the sales of traditional Eaton's stores, as opposed to the other discounters. Horizon brand general manager W. A. Kelley was promoted to vice-president of distribution soon after the stores began operating, part of a larger issue with operations-level turnover.

National Post reported that Horizon stopped carrying refrigerators in autumn 1973, as they weren't selling because of the store's lack of delivery service. A latter book countered that the store's self-serve format were to blame, as "...there was no floor staff to explain the different features on something such as a line of refrigerators. That foray wasted another six months as heavy goods were moved into all the stores, then had to be wheeled out again when they failed to sell." In an attempt to shore up the concept and block competition, Eaton's partnered with J. C. Penney on a "joint study" in 1974. In 1975, T. Eaton expected profits for their Horizon division within two years.

T. Eaton decided in January 1976 to end its catalogue division, sparking analyst suggestion that Horizon would be wound down immediately after. T. Eaton announced the end of this format in October 1978, with the transition to be complete by January 1979, less than seven years after opening. Unnamed analysts quoted by the Star and Globe suggested that T. Eaton entered the discount too late, after K-Mart, Woolco and Zellers were well-established, and didn't expand enough to be noticed in the market. The company claimed that the change wasn't representative of the stores' performance, but rather a marketing strategy for smaller suburban stores "that has been extremely successful in the United States and Australia".

The six Metro Toronto and two London locations were to be branded as Eaton's. The four Quebec locations would keep the existing brand, but would be managed by Eaton's Quebec division. The stores remained smaller than most Eaton's locations, but with the same products and a "softer" look.

=== Legacy ===
The company's poor financials in the 1980s have been attributed to Horizon and its involvement in the Ontario Downtown Renewal Program, leading to cuts in the 1980s that sparked unionization in various store locations and a strike in 1985.

Some documentation of the stores survives at the Archives of Ontario, as part of the T. Eaton Company fonds.

== Locations ==
The book Eaton's: the Trans-Canada store lists 13 Horizon stores, a number that aligns with era media coverage. (The Eatons: the rise and fall of Canada's royal family (1999) claims, however, that there were 15 opened.)

- Victoria Park and Sheppard (Scarborough, Metro Toronto, 16 August 1972)
- Westmount Mall (London, 1 November 1972)
- Northland Shopping Centre (London, 1 November 1972)
- Yonge Eglinton Centre (Toronto, 27 June 1973)
- Dufferin Plaza (Toronto, 26 September 1973)
- Greenfield Park (Montreal, 15 November 1973)
- Les Galeries St-Laurent (Montreal, 15 November 1973)
- Les Galeries des Mille-Iles (Rosemere, 15 November 1973)
- Rexdale Plaza (Etobicoke, Metro Toronto, 2 October 1973): This location was intended to be the second opened in the chain.
- Gerrard Square (Toronto, 14 August 1974)
- Place Montenach (Beloeil, 6 March 1975)
- Centre Domaine (Montreal, 6 March 1975)

A location of the store existed at Mississauga, Ontario's Rockwood Mall. Eaton's: the Trans-Canada store lists this as Sheridan Mall, opening 15 November 1972, but Rockwood had yet to open by March 1973.
