= Ciné Starz =

Canadian cinema chain

- Industry: Movie theatres
- Number of locations: 8
- Area served: Quebec and Ontario
- Key people: Bruce Gurberg (CEO)
- Website: cinestarz.ca

Ciné Starz is a Canadian cinema chain. It operates 8 theatres in Quebec and Ontario, including three acquired from Cinémas Guzzo and another acquired from Imagine Cinemas.

== Locations ==
- Burlington, ON
- Côte Saint-Luc, QC
- Dollard-Des-Ormeaux, QC
- Etobicoke, ON
- Greenfield Park, QC
- Longueuil, QC
- Montreal, QC
- Ottawa, ON (St. Laurent Shopping Centre)

=== Former theatres ===
- Gatineau, QC (Les Promenades) - closed in 2013
- Grenville, QC - closed in 2022
- Mississauga, ON - closed in 2020, now Central Parkway Cinema
- Orleans, ON - closed in 2023
- Saint-Léonard, QC (Carrefour Langelier) - closed in 2024
