= Vincenzo Guzzo =

Canadian entrepreneur, philanthropist and television personality

Vincenzo Guzzo OMRI SMOM
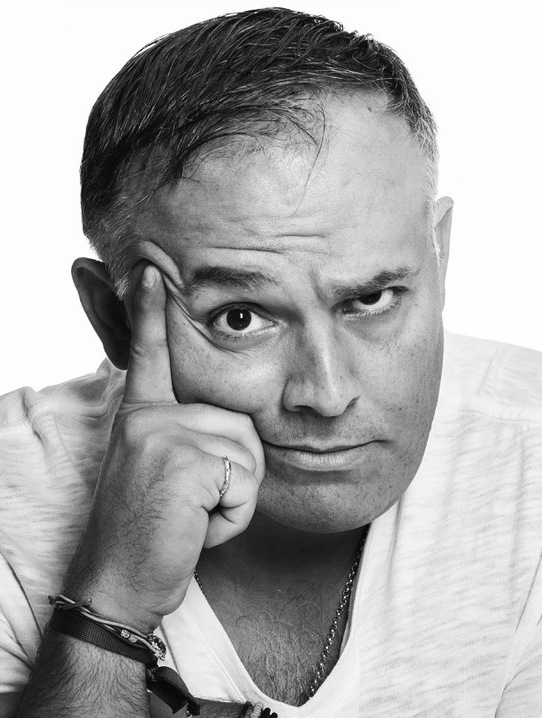
- Guzzo in 2015
- Born: 11 June 1969 (age 57); Montreal, Quebec, Canada
- Other names: "Mr. Sunshine", Vincent Guzzo
- Citizenship: Canada; Italy
- Education: Western University; UQAM (Université du Québec à Montréal)
- Known for: Cinémas Guzzo; Dragons' Den
- Spouses: Annie Claude De Paoli (m. 1996–2005) Maria Farella (m. 2007–2024)
- Children: 5

Vincenzo "Vince" Guzzo OMRI SMOM (Italian pronunciation: [vinˈtʃɛntso ˈɡuttso]; born 11 June 1969) is a Canadian businessman and television personality. He is CEO of Cinémas Guzzo. Guzzo was a recipient of the Queen Elizabeth II Diamond Jubilee Medal in 2012, was knighted by the Order of Merit of the Italian Republic and is a member of the Order of Malta.

In 2018 Guzzo joined the cast of the CBC Television business reality show Dragons' Den as one of the investor "Dragons" in season 13 through season 18.

== Early life ==
Guzzo was born on 11 June 1969, in Montreal, the only son of Italian immigrants. He attended Selwyn House School, a private boys' school in Westmount, Quebec, where his classmates included Greg Fergus, Mark Pathy and Michael Penner. A profile in the Montreal Gazette from 19 September 2018 says the following about his early life:

As a student at Selwyn House School, Guzzo would do his homework in his father’s office at the movie theatre. He later worked as an usher, and then in other capacities in the business.

He studied economics at Western University in London, Ontario, and law at Université du Québec à Montréal.

== Business career ==
Guzzo is the president and CEO of Cinémas Guzzo— which was the largest movie operator in Quebec, with 106 screens and 7 locations, and the third-largest in Canada. Cinéma Guzzo went bankrupt and was ordered by the courts to close its 7 locations on 22 January 2025. He had another new cinema, Méga-Plex St-Jean 12, opened in 2021, which was subsequently closed in 2025 due to challenges imposed by the COVID-19 global health crisis.

Cinémas Guzzo was started by his father, Angelo Guzzo, who remains chairman of the board. He came to Canada from Italy in 1967 and worked as a machinist for Pratt & Whitney. In 1974, he bought a movie theatre, the Cinéma Paradis, which had been closed and left abandoned for the previous ten years, creating friction with the local citizens. Vincent worked as an usher and in other small roles as a student. In 1991, he joined his father in the family business. As the chain expanded in the late 1990s and new locations were established, the construction division of Cinémas Guzzo did the building, and Guzzo helped with the design work.

In May 2019, Guzzo submitted a bid to purchase the Montreal Alouettes of the Canadian Football League. He later pulled out of the running to buy the team, citing "personal conflicts with people around the deal." Guzzo posted on social media that he did not believe that CFL commissioner Randy Ambrosie knew what he was doing during negotiations, and had acted "in a non transparent way and wasted my time."

Guzzo has been president of APCQ (L'Association des propriétaires de cinémas du Québec)—an association of Québec cinema owners—since 2012.

== Dragons' Den ==
Guzzo joined the cast of the CBC Television business reality show Dragons' Den as one of the investor "Dragons" for season 13. The first episode of season 13, including the two new "Dragons", Guzzo and Lane Merrifield, aired on September 20, 2018. Dragons' Den is a Canadian TV show on the CBC Television network, with an average of 519,000 viewers per episode in the 2017–2018 season.

== Controversies ==
=== Financial troubles and creditor disputes ===
In 2024, significant financial challenges emerged for Cinémas Guzzo, the theater chain helmed by Vincent Guzzo. According to reports from La Presse, creditors, including CIBC and private lenders, initiated legal proceedings against Guzzo's group, demanding repayment of over $60 million in outstanding debts. CIBC, the largest creditor, sought $37 million, citing "negligent management," including prolonged overdrafts and unpaid property taxes totaling $1.4 million. Additional claims from Banque Équitable and private lenders Q-12 Capital and Q-8 Capital amounted to nearly $26 million.

In November 2024, Quebec Superior Court placed Cinémas Guzzo under interim receivership and ordered the company to open its books to Raymond Chabot, a financial recovery firm. Judge Michel Pinsonnault criticized the company for failing to take its financial situation seriously, stating, “Burying one's head in the sand will not make Groupe Guzzo's financial problems disappear.”

Despite Guzzo's claims of imminent refinancing and optimism about resolving the debt, the chain's struggles became more visible when Guzzo confirmed the closure of Cinema Des Sources in Dollard-des-Ormeaux. Employees of the location reported late or missed paychecks, allegations Guzzo denied. The financial strain also reportedly led to operational issues, including the heat being shut off in some theaters. Guzzo declined to comment on these claims, but stated he was taking steps to comply with court orders.

=== Allegations of nonpayment and unfinished projects ===
Separately, Guzzo's group faced lawsuits from landlords of properties housing Cinémas Guzzo theaters. These landlords alleged that the company issued bounced checks and failed to pay millions in back rent. In one case, Guzzo was accused of failing to complete promised construction work for a shopping center, despite receiving $9 million in payments. He asserted that he was actively working to resolve these disputes, including plans to repurchase one of the contested properties.

Adding to these challenges, Guzzo faced backlash from employees at Cinema Des Sources. Workers expressed frustration over operational mismanagement, citing irregular pay and a lack of communication about the theater's closure. Guzzo denied the claims, stating that all employees were paid and that the decision to close the theater was unrelated to financial troubles, as the lease was set to expire. Nevertheless, the closure underscored the ongoing struggles within Guzzo's theater empire.

=== Industry challenges and "Popcorngate" ===
Guzzo has faced industry-wide challenges stemming from the COVID-19 pandemic. A critic of Quebec's lockdown measures, including a temporary ban on the sale of popcorn in theaters, he publicly opposed the government's restrictions. The backlash was dubbed "Popcorngate," leading to eventual compensation for theater owners from Premier François Legault. Guzzo has cited the pandemic as a significant factor in his company's prolonged financial recovery.

=== Harassment charges ===
In June 2023, Guzzo faced criminal charges for harassment and breach of conditions related to a family dispute. The allegations included engaging in harassment and violating a communication ban with the complainant. Guzzo denied the accusations and described the charges as unfounded. In December 2023, the Crown dropped all charges, citing insufficient evidence to ensure a reasonable prospect of conviction. Guzzo expressed relief at the resolution of the case, framing the ordeal as a misunderstanding stemming from personal disputes.

== Personal life ==
Guzzo has five children (Angelo II, Vittorio Emanuele, Vito, Delano, and Rossella). He and the family raise money for the Jewish General Hospital, the Shriners Hospital and youth mental health.

Guzzo holds both Canadian and Italian citizenship.

The CBC Dragon's Den blog explains:

[The Guzzo family], are renowned philanthropists, giving generously to numerous hospitals and culminating in the establishment of the Guzzo Family Foundation in 2007, which is aggressively invested in cancer nanotechnology research at Montreal’s Jewish General Hospital and McGill University. Guzzo’s contributions have been internationally recognized as he is the recipient of the Queen’s Diamond Jubilee Medal, was knighted by the Order of Merit of the Italian Republic and is a distinguished member of the Order of Malta.

Guzzo is nicknamed "Mr. Sunshine", and his outfits usually feature the colour yellow.

== Awards and honours ==
- Queen's Diamond Jubilee Medal (2012)
- Order of Merit of the Italian Republic
- Order of Malta
- Canada's Top 40 Under 40 - 2002 honouree
