= Héritage (Canadian store) =

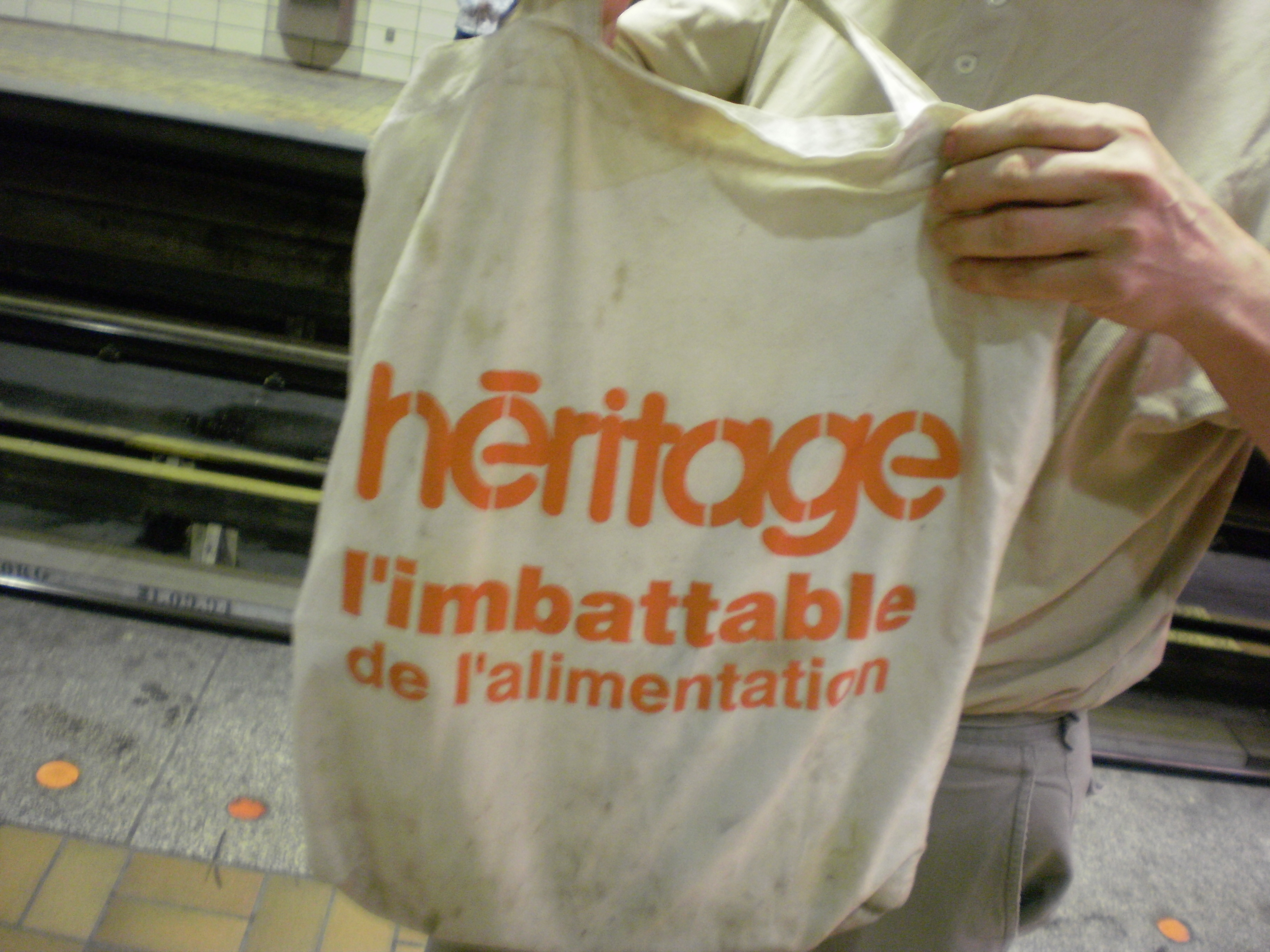
- A bag with the logo of Héritage.
- Company type: Division
- Industry: Supermarket
- Founded: 1982
- Defunct: 1995
- Fate: Rebranded as Maxi
- Successor: Maxi
- Headquarters: Montreal, Quebec, Canada
- Products: Bakery, beer, dairy, deli, frozen foods, general grocery, liquor, meat & poultry, produce, seafood, snacks, wine
- Parent: Provigo

Héritage was a banner of discount grocery stores owned by Provigo to market smaller supermarkets in Quebec.

== History ==
Launched in February 1982 by Provigo, the first store was located on 3565 Taschereau Boulevard in Saint-Hubert, Quebec. In 1992, several of the Steinberg's locations that the company Provigo acquired were transferred to its Héritage chain.

The size of a typical Héritage outlet was between that of a traditional supermarket and a Maxi store. Héritage carried less products but offered bigger discounts than its sister chain Maxi. Like Maxi, Héritage stores were company-owned in contrast to the Provigo-branded locations that tended to be franchisees.

In April 1995, Provigo folded the 42 Héritage stores into Maxi bringing the latter's number of locations to 67. According to Provigo, having its discount stores under the single Maxi banner would enable it to provide better customer service.

In 2014, a plan by Provigo's owner Loblaws to revive the Héritage name was cancelled. This time, Héritage would have been used for franchises stores.
