= Collège Français (Longueuil) =

Location
- 1340 Nobert Boulevard; Longueuil, Quebec, J4K 2P4; Canada; 45.508°N 73.483°W

Information
- School type: Private, Secondary School
- Founded: 1987
- Principal: Roger Goehry
- Grades: Grade 7-11
- Enrollment: 1,000
- Language: French
- Area: South Shore (Montreal)
- Team name: Longueuil Collège Français
- Website: www.collegefrancais.ca

Collège Français is a private French-language secondary school in Longueuil, Quebec, Canada.

It was established in 1987. It followed a Collège Français primary school that opened in Longueuil in 1972, and a campus of the Collège Français secondary school in Montreal which opened in 1959.

Collège Français is home to the Longueuil Collège Français Quebec Junior AAA Hockey League team.
