= Maxi (Canadian supermarket) =

Quebec subsidiary of the Loblaw Companies

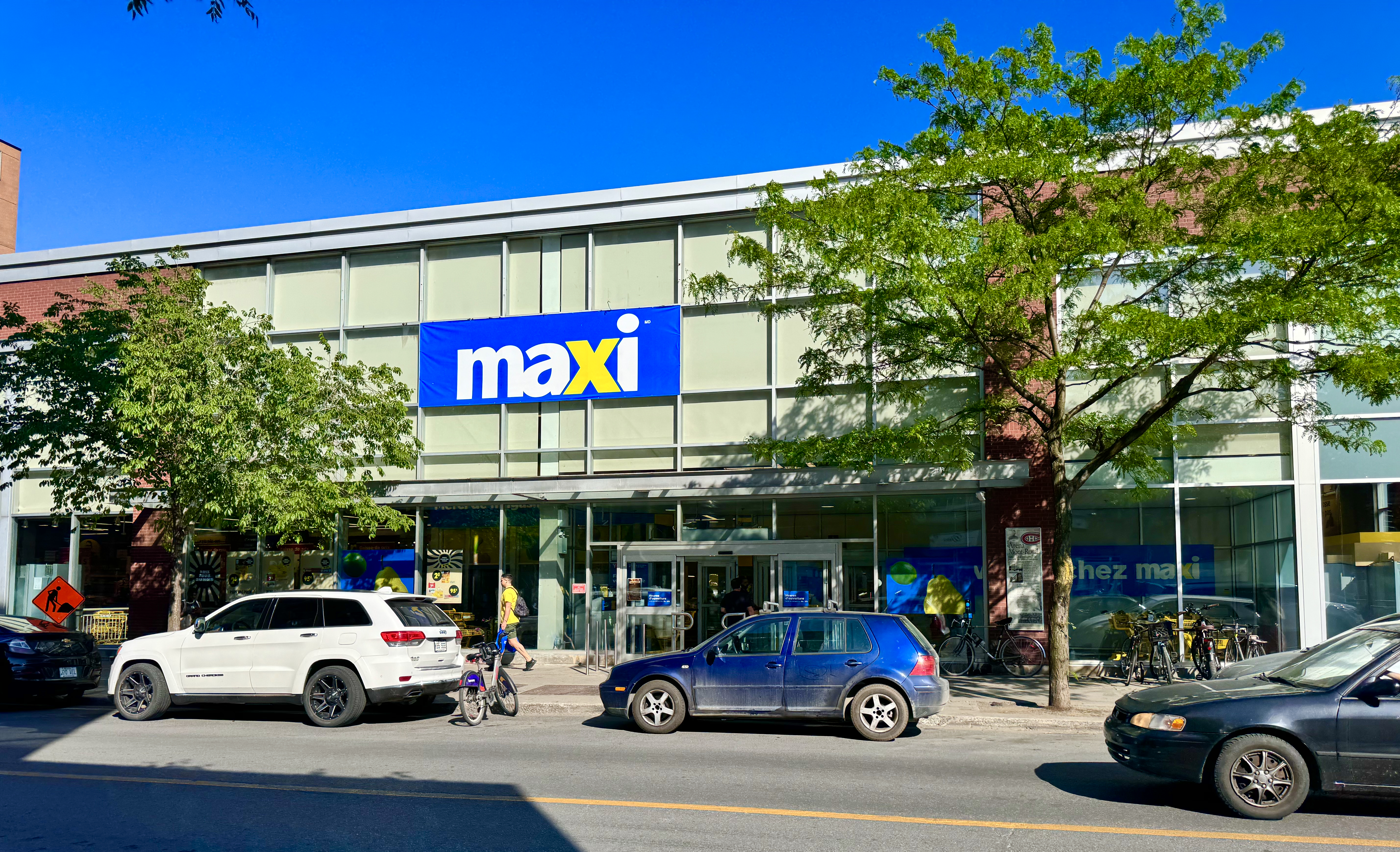
- A Maxi store in Montreal
- Type: Division
- Industry: Supermarket (Maxi); Hypermarket (Maxi & Cie)
- Founded: 1984; 42 years ago
- Products: Bakery, beer, dairy, deli, frozen foods, gasoline, general grocery, general merchandise, liquor, meat & poultry, produce, seafood, snacks, wine
- Number of employees: 10,000
- Parent: Loblaw Companies
- Website: maxi.ca

Maxi is a discount grocery retailer based in Quebec, Canada. Founded in 1984 by Provigo, it is a division of Loblaw Companies and the largest of Loblaws' Quebec supermarket chains. Maxi is the Quebec equivalent of No Frills, a chain of franchised discount grocery stores outside Quebec, except that Maxi stores are owned by the company. Over 7,000 people are employed at the Maxi and Maxi & Cie stores across Quebec. Maxi's slogans are "Imbattable. Point final." ("Unbeatable. Period"), which references their price match guarantee, and "Maxi, ben oui, Maxi" ("Maxi, well yes, Maxi"), the latter of which is often uttered by their spokesperson, comedian Martin Matte, in their television ads.

== History ==
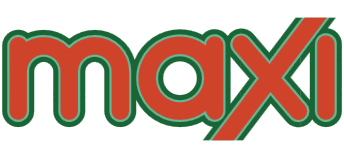
Maxi's second logo from about 1994 to 2002

The first Maxi store opened November 19, 1984 in a former Kmart location in Longueuil. At 56,000 square metres (600,000 sq ft), this store was three times the size of conventional supermarkets. Maxi was intended to be a larger spinoff version of Provigo's Héritage supermarket chain.

By 1987, Maxi had grown to a chain of six locations and three of these stores included a day-care centre for parents to leave their children for up to 90 minutes while shopping. Throughout the 1980s and early 90s, Maxi used a cartoonish elephant as its mascot. When Steinberg became defunct in 1992, many of its locations were converted into Maxi stores. In 1993, several Provigo stores (especially the larger ones) were rebranded as Maxi locations. Maxi absorbed the Héritage chain in 1995 to reach a total of 67 locations.

Maxi became a division of Loblaws following the latter's acquisition of Provigo in 1999. Maxi used to have stores in Ontario beginning in 1997, but they were eventually closed or converted to other Loblaws banners (such as Fortinos) in 1999.

As of 2026, there are 185 Maxi locations in Quebec.

== Maxi & Cie ==
Maxi & Cie logo

The chain's Maxi & Cie/Maxi & Co. locations are larger and carry a wider variety of general merchandise. The first Maxi & Cie opened on September 25, 1996 on Jean-Talon street in Saint-Léonard, Quebec and is still in operation. Some Maxi & Cie outlets are themselves former Maxi stores that were converted because of their larger size. This includes the original store in Longueuil.

Like with Maxi, Maxi & Co. used to have stores in Ontario, but Maxi & Co. withdrew from Ontario in 1999 after the Loblaws purchase of the chain. The 1999 movie Pushing Tin had a scene at one of the Maxi & Co. stores in Ontario.

== See also ==
- No Frills (grocery store)
- Provigo
- List of supermarket chains in Canada
