= Collège Français (Montreal) =

Location
- 185, rue Fairmount Ouest; Montreal, Quebec, H2T 2M6; Canada; 45.522°N 73.597°W

Information
- School type: Private Secondary School
- Founded: 1959
- Grades: Grade 7-11
- Language: French
- Area: Le Plateau Mont-Royal
- Website: www.collegefrancais.ca

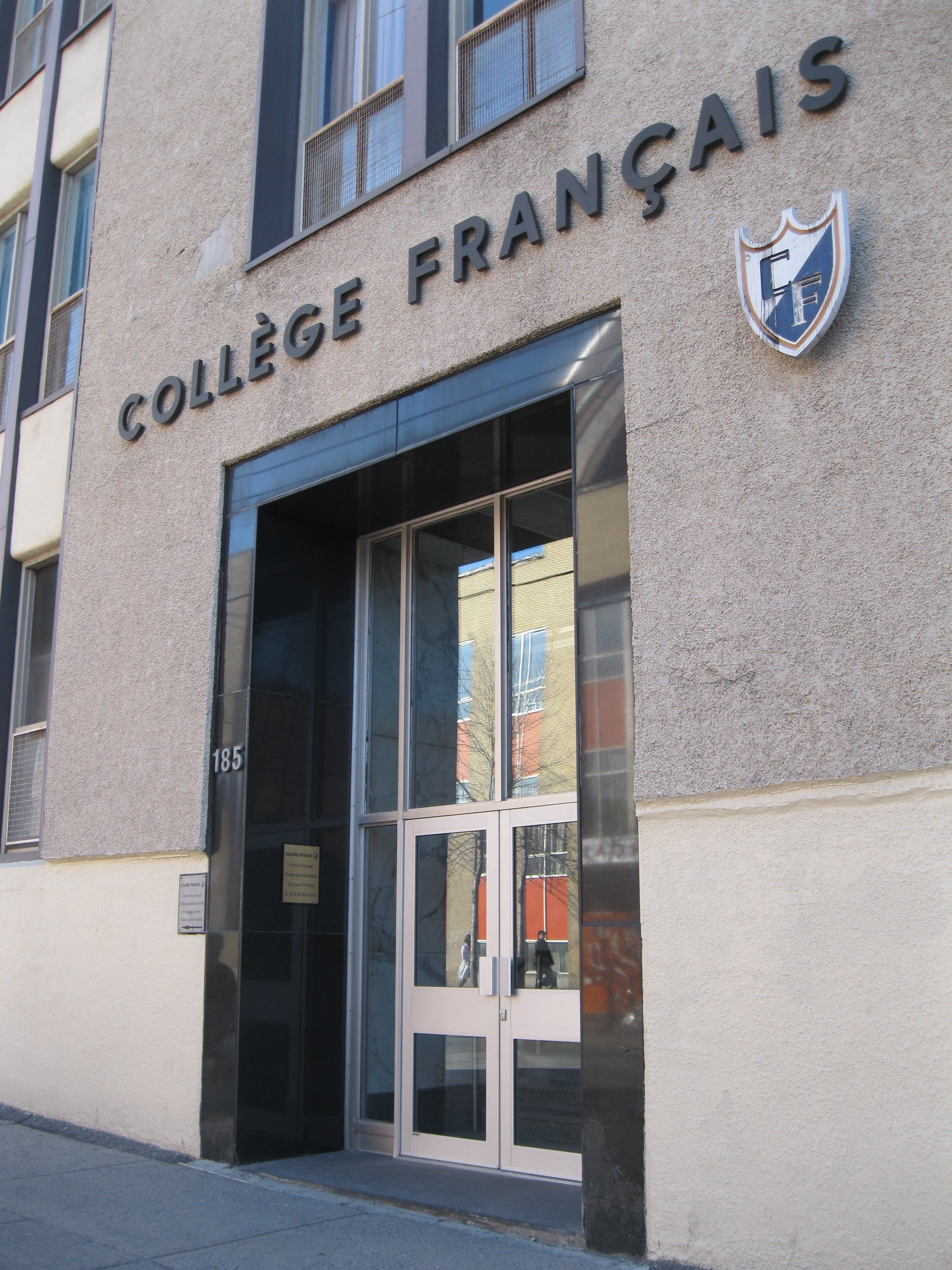
College Francais

Collège Français is a French-language private Secondary school founded in 1959 and is located on Fairmount Avenue in the borough of Le Plateau-Mont-Royal in Montreal, Quebec, Canada.

== See also ==
- Collège Français (Longueuil)
