= Cinémas Guzzo =

Canadian movie theater chain

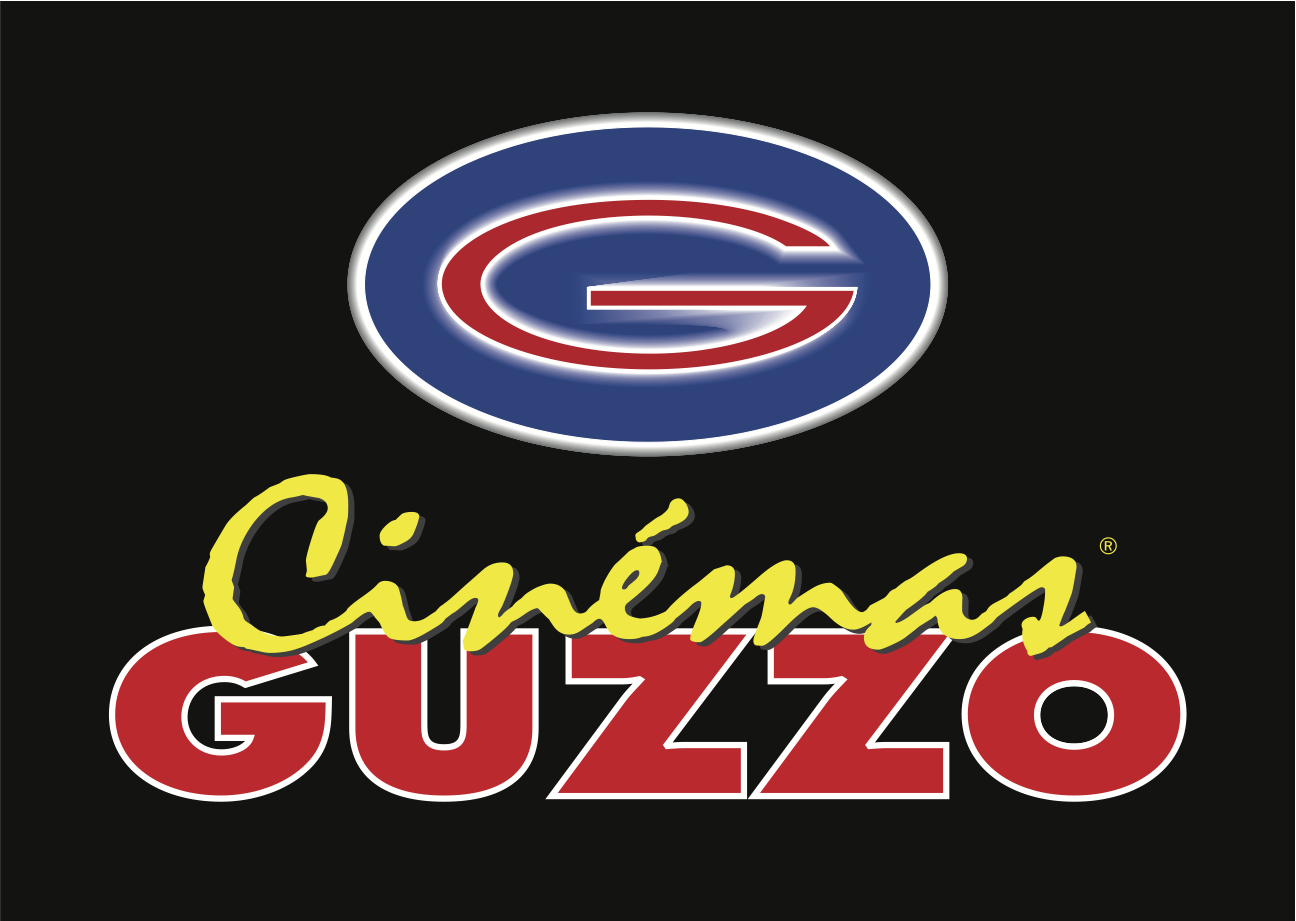
- Company type: Private
- Industry: Entertainment (movie theatres)
- Founded: 1974
- Fate: 9 locations closed or sold; 1 reopened (May 2025)
- Headquarters: 1055, chemin du Coteau; Terrebonne, Quebec; J6W 5H2
- Key people: Angelo Guzzo (Founder & Chairperson of the Board) Vincenzo Guzzo (President) Angelo Guzzo II (Chief Financial Officer) Vito Franco (Vice-President - Film); Mario Quattrociocche (Vice-President - Construction); Ilario Maiolo (Vice-President - Legal); Maria Farella (Vice-President - Community Affairs)
- Products: Movie Theaters
- Owner: Privately Owned by the Guzzo Family
- Number of employees: 600
- Subsidiaries: Cinemas Guzzo Films
- Website: www.cinemasguzzo.com
- Footnotes / references Related: Groupe Guzzo Construction, Groupe Guzzo Pont-Viau, Groupe Guzzo Terrebonne, Groupe Guzzo Lacordaire, Mega-Centre Guzzo Pont-Viau, Mega-Centre Guzzo Ste-Dorothee

Cinémas Guzzo is a former regional chain of movie theaters, currently operating only one location in the Canadian province of Quebec. On February 6, 2025, all its locations were temporarily closed and operations suspended, following a court order to liquidate assets in order to repay debt owed to creditors. It is uncertain if the theater chain will survive.

As of May 2025, only the Terrebonne (French-only) theatre location reopened.

== History ==
Cinémas Guzzo was started by Angelo Guzzo shortly after immigrating to Canada. He was born in Italy in 1946. In 1969, Vincenzo Guzzo was born and remains the Guzzo's only child. Vincenzo has had 5 children. After serving as the company's executive vice-president since 1990, as of 2018, Vincenzo took on the position of president.

In 2000, Cinémas Guzzo was identified as one of the 50 best managed private companies in Canada.

In 2001, revenues for the company were approximately $45 million, up roughly $5 million from the previous year. 2001 also saw an increase of nearly 500,000 tickets sold.

In 2007, they created the Guzzo Environment-Cancer Research Chair of the Cancer Research Society in partnership with the Université de Montréal. The following year, the first ever Notte in Bianco fundraising event took place, which raised roughly $400,000 in support of the fight against cancer.

In July 2012, Cinémas Guzzo completed their conversion of all their projectors to digital projectors. That same year, saw the opening of five IMAX screens at selected existing locations.

In late-2018, it was reported that Guzzo had been considering expanding his chain outside of Quebec, and had been investigating potential sites in Alberta and British Columbia, such as Calgary and Vancouver.

In 2020, during the COVID-19 pandemic in Quebec, cinemas were forced to shut down from March 25 to July 2. Guzzo had hoped to remain open during the closure period, but that did not come to pass. After cinemas reopened, theatre capacity was reduced to prevent spread of SARS-CoV-2 infections leading to COVID-19, with enhanced sanitary and cleaning protocols. The 2020 season was threatened by the situation in the U.S. as American chains could not operate in many places, and American studios did not release films into the market due to the COVID and screen room situation. Theatres were again closed on October 1 in Montreal, where Guzzo operated.

In 2021, as the COVID-19 pandemic continued, the Guzzo chain declined to reopen, as it believed that reopening restrictions were too strict and it refused to accept further government subsidies. The government imposed a provincial lockdown from December 26, 2020 to February 7, 2021, and later announced that cinemas across Quebec could reopen on February 26, 2021, with several restrictions. In red zones, where the Guzzo chain was located, this included a 7:30 p.m. closing time and a ban on food and drinks during movies. Guzzo noted that no outbreaks had occurred in all of Canada through cinemas during 2020.

In November 2024, Canadian Imperial Bank of Commerce applied to a court to place Cinémas Guzzo in bankruptcy under the Companies' Creditors Arrangement Act because of the company's financial difficulties, including unpaid loans and property taxes. As part of the restructuring, the Cinema Des Sources location permanently closed.

In January 2025, continuing to struggle with financial woes and debt, two more locations were permanently closed, the Mega-Plex Marche Central and Mega-Plex Saint-Jean.

In February 2025, despite still producing income, all remaining theater locations were temporarily closed by the court, in order to better facilitate the liquidation of assets to repay the $39 million in debt owned to creditors. 350 workers were temporarily laid off following the closures. It was later reported the company has amassed over $100 million in debt overall. Land, buildings and equipment are being put up for sale. It is uncertain if the company will re-emerge following the liquidation process, and if the chain itself will survive.

In May 2025, the Terrebonne location was reopened. The chain's CEO, Vincenzo Guzzo, claimed plans to demolish and completely rebuild brand new theatres, while also expanding into commercial and residential building projects on the former theatre sites. It is uncertain any of this will go through, including maintaining the one reopened theatre, as he still owes substantial debt to his creditors.

== Theatres ==
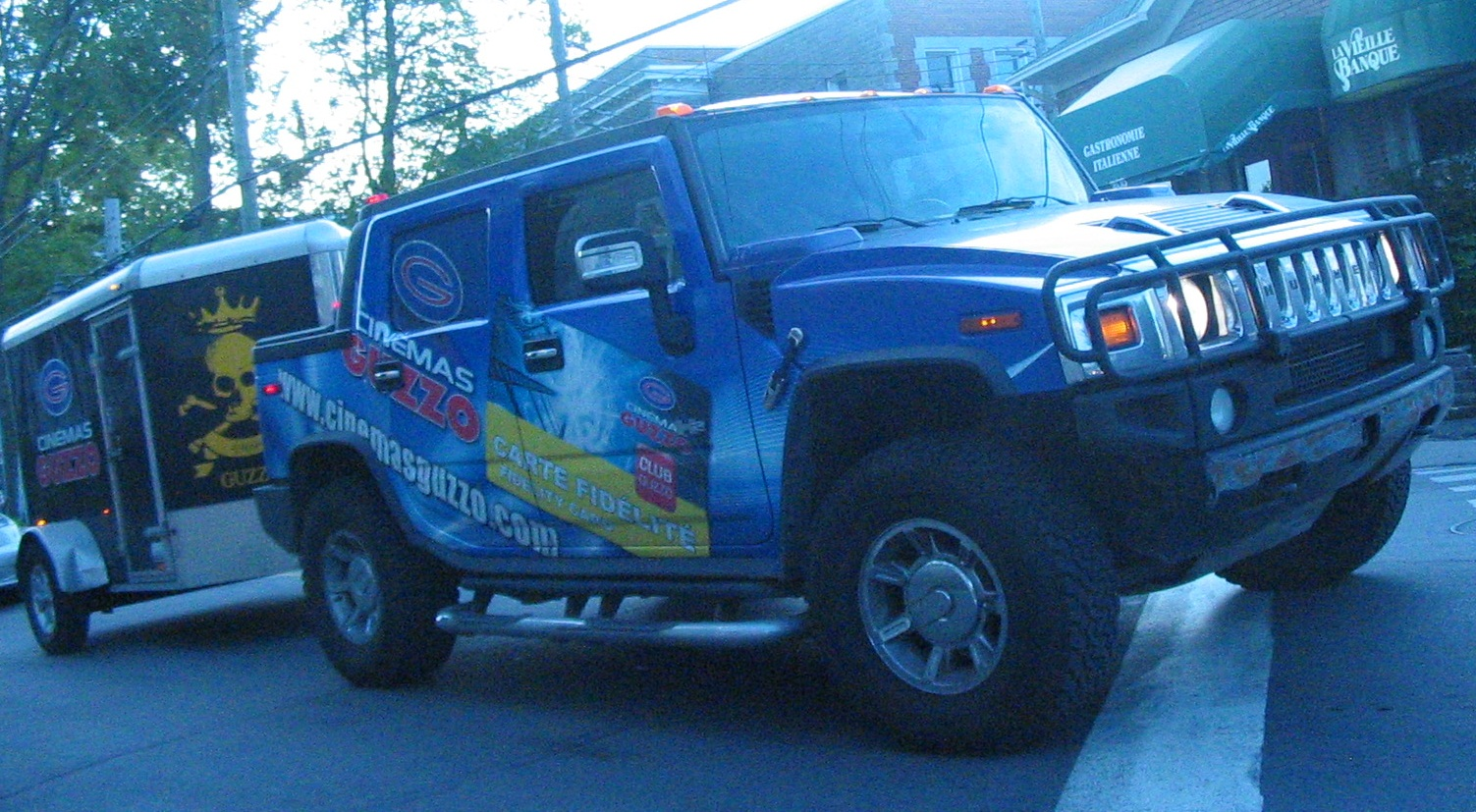
Hummer H2 SUT with the theatre chain's logo.

Guzzo Méga-Plex Terrebonne IMAX is currently the only Cinémas Guzzo location in operation. Located in Terrebonne, QC, it is the chain's most profitable and oldest location, having opened in April 1991. Movies are presented in both languages, and there are 14 digital screens, including two IMAX screens.

Cinema Guzzo Mega-Plex Deux-Montagne IMAX, following its closure, underwent demolition starting July 2, 2025.

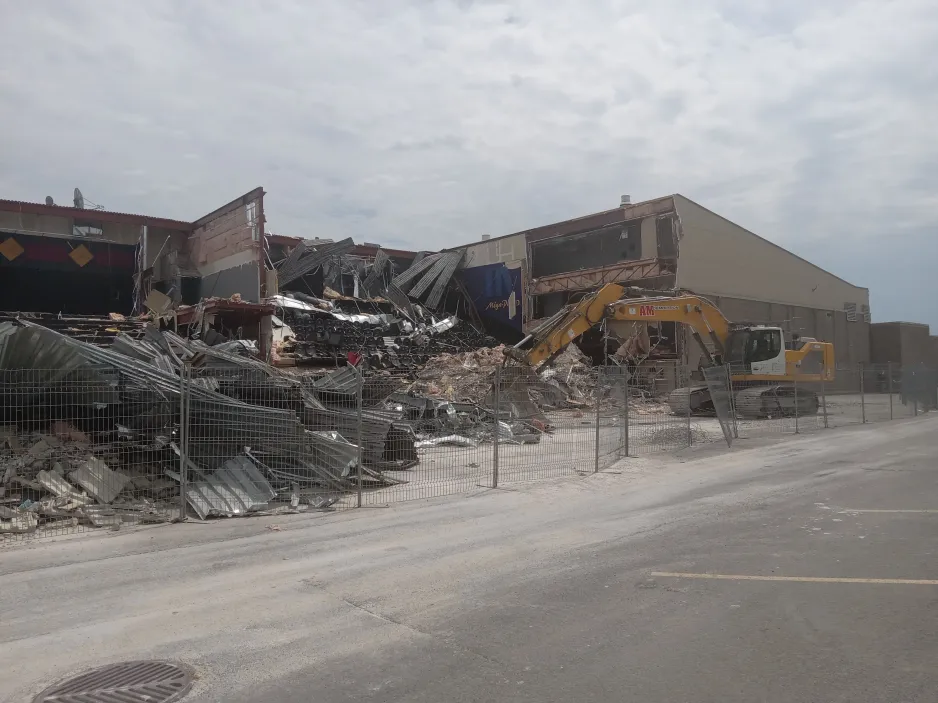
Cinema Guzzo Mega-Plex Deux-Montagne IMAX during its demolition.

List of Cinémas Guzzo locations
Theatre name	Digital Screens	IMAX Screens	Location	Date Opened	Status	Language of films
Méga-Plex Marché Central IMAX	18	2	Montreal, QC	June 2005	Closed	English, French
Méga-Plex Lacordaire	16	0	Montreal, QC	November 1996	Closed	English, French
Méga-Plex Pont-Viau IMAX	16	1	Laval, QC	December 1998	Closed	English, French
Méga-Plex Deux-Montagnes IMAX	14	1	Deux-Montagnes, Quebec	May 2005	Closed	English, French
Méga-Plex Sphèretech	14	0	Saint-Laurent, QC	May 1999	Closed	English
Méga-Plex Terrebonne IMAX	14	2	Terrebonne, QC	April 1991	Operational	French
Méga-Plex Saint-Jean	12	1	Saint-Jean-sur-Richelieu, QC	December 2021	Closed	English, French

In 2025, Ciné Starz purchased three former Cinéma Guzzo theatres:

- Cinéma Guzzo Des Sources IMAX (opened in June 1998 in Dollard-des-Ormeaux, QC)
- Guzzo Méga-Plex Jacques-Cartier (opened in October 1999 in Longueuil, QC)
- Guzzo Méga-Plex Taschereau IMAX (opened in October 1998 in Greenfield Park, QC)
