= Morguard =

Canadian real estate company

Morguard Corporation
- Company type: Public
- Traded as: TSX: MRC
- Industry: Real estate
- Founded: 1905; 121 years ago
- Headquarters: Mississauga, Ontario, Canada
- Key people: K. Rai Sahi (CEO)
- Net income: CA$173 million (2016)
- Website: www.morguard.com

Morguard Corporation is a Canadian real estate company, based in Mississauga, Ontario. It owns retail, residential, office, industrial, and hotel properties, as well as managing real estate and financial investments for institutional investors. As of October 2017, it owned $9.4 billion in real estate, and managed an additional $12.6 billion.

Some of its owned properties are through its controlling ownership in two publicly listed real estate investment trusts, Morguard REIT and Morguard North American Residential REIT, and the publicly listed Temple Hotels. It is a public company listed on the Toronto Stock Exchange.

== History ==
Morguard was founded in 1905 as D. Ackland & Son Limited. It originally made carriage parts, but transitioned into automobile parts in the 1910s. In 1960, it renamed itself Acklands Limited. At some point, it transitioned to being a wholesale distributor of automobile and industrial parts, as opposed to a manufacturer. Financial problems at the company in the 1980s led to the current president, K. Rai Sahi, taking control of the company in 1990. The company sold its industrial parts distribution to W.W. Grainger in 1996 for $250 million USD; this division was renamed Acklands-Grainger. In 1997, it sold half of automotive group to General Parts. In 1997, Acklands began investing in real estate, and was renamed Acktion Corporation. It eventually sold its remaining auto parts distribution business to focus on real estate.

Notable acquisitions by Acktion include Goldlist Properties and Revenue Properties. One of its investments was Morguard REIT, a newly formed real estate investment trust. Morguard REIT had been launched by Morguard Investment Services, which had been founded in 1966, to sell mortgages to pension funds. It expanded to real estate in the 1970s. After investing in a number of other Morguard companies, Acktion renamed itself Morguard Corporation in 2002.

Morguard North American Residential REIT had an IPO in 2012, with properties spun-off from Morguard Corporation.

== Business ==
Morguard owns and manages retail, residential, office, industrial, and hotel properties, as well as financial investments. As of October 2017, of its $16.2 billion in owned and managed real estate, 37% are retail, 26% are residential, 25% are offices, 9% are industrial, and the remaining 3% are hotels. Of its real estate assets, 45% are in Ontario, 15% are in Alberta, 13% are in British Columbia, 10% are in the rest of Canada, and the remaining 17% are in the United States. Morguard REIT (MRT.UN) owns $2.9 billion in assets, primarily shopping centres and offices. Morguard North American Residential REIT (MRG.UN) owns $2.5 billion in assets, primarily multi-residential properties in the United States and Canada. Temple Hotels (TPH) owns $500 million in Canadian hotel properties.

As of January 2017, CEO K. Rai Sahi owned approximately 55% of shares in Morguard Corporation.

In 2024, Morguard sold a portfolio of 14 hotels in Canada for $410 million. The company stated this decision was made to focus on other real estate investments.

== Properties ==
=== Shopping centres ===
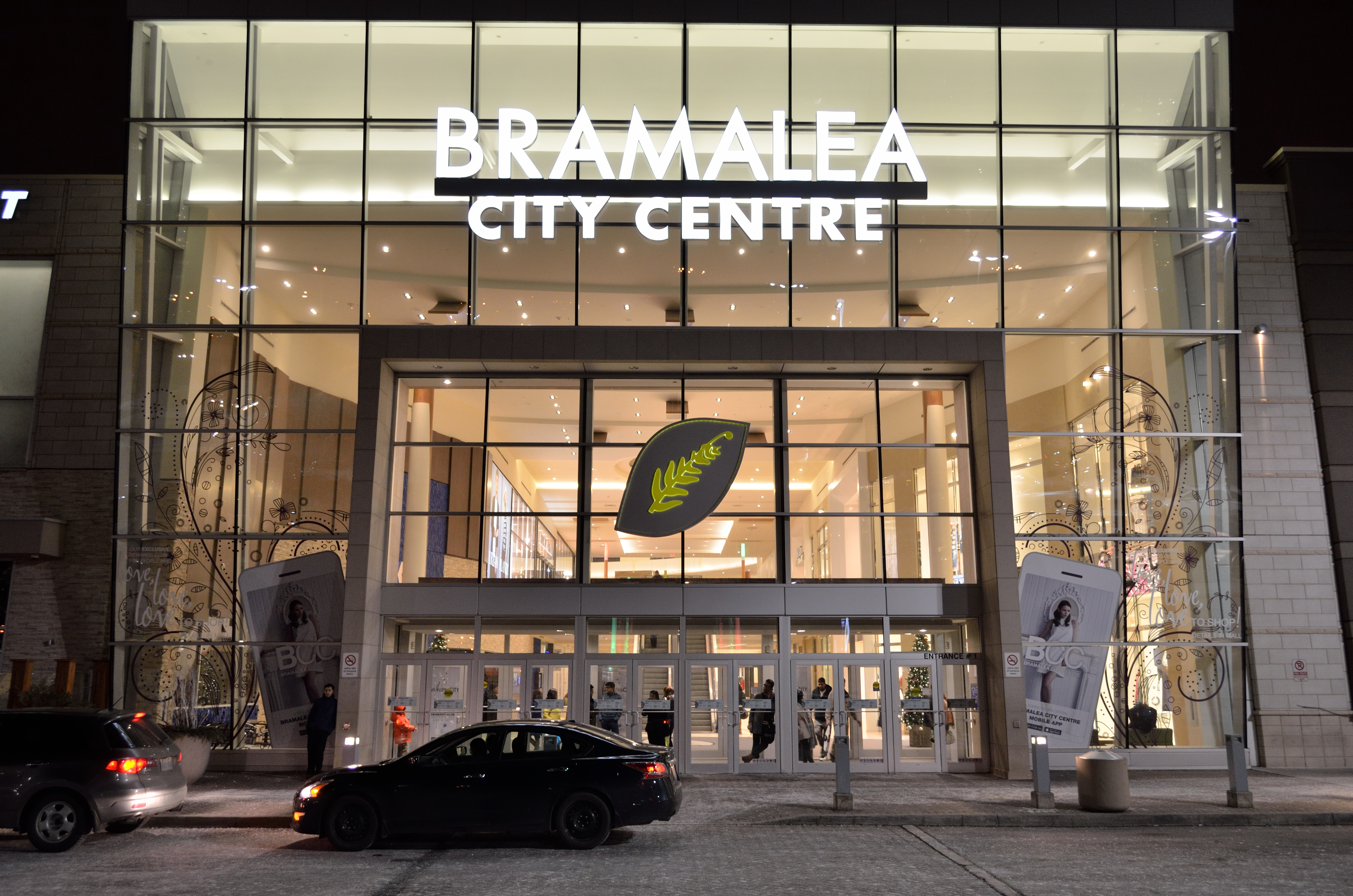
Bramalea City Centre, managed by Morguard

As of June 2021, Morguard REIT (MRT) owns a diversified real-estate portfolio of 47 commercial properties across six provinces of Canada. The following are Morguard-owned shopping centres that have an area of at least 300,000 sq ft (28,000 m^{2}).

==== Owned ====
Shopping centres owned by MRC (+300,000 sqft), as of June 2021
| Shopping centre | Location | Province/state | Ownership |
|---|---|---|---|
| Bramalea City Centre | Brampton | Ontario | MRC (21%) |
| Cambridge Centre | Cambridge | Ontario | MRT |
| Centerpoint Mall | Toronto | Ontario | MRC |
| Northgate Shopping Centre | North Bay | Ontario | MRC |
| The Centre | Saskatoon | Saskatchewan | MRT |
| East York Town Centre | Toronto | Ontario | MRC |
| North Shore Square | Slidell | Louisiana | MRC |
| Pine Centre Mall | Prince George | British Columbia | MRT |
| Parkland Mall | Red Deer | Alberta | MRT |
| Shoppers Mall | Brandon | Manitoba | MRT |
| Southland Mall | Houma | Louisiana | MRC |
| St. Laurent Centre | Ottawa | Ontario | MRT |

==== Managed ====
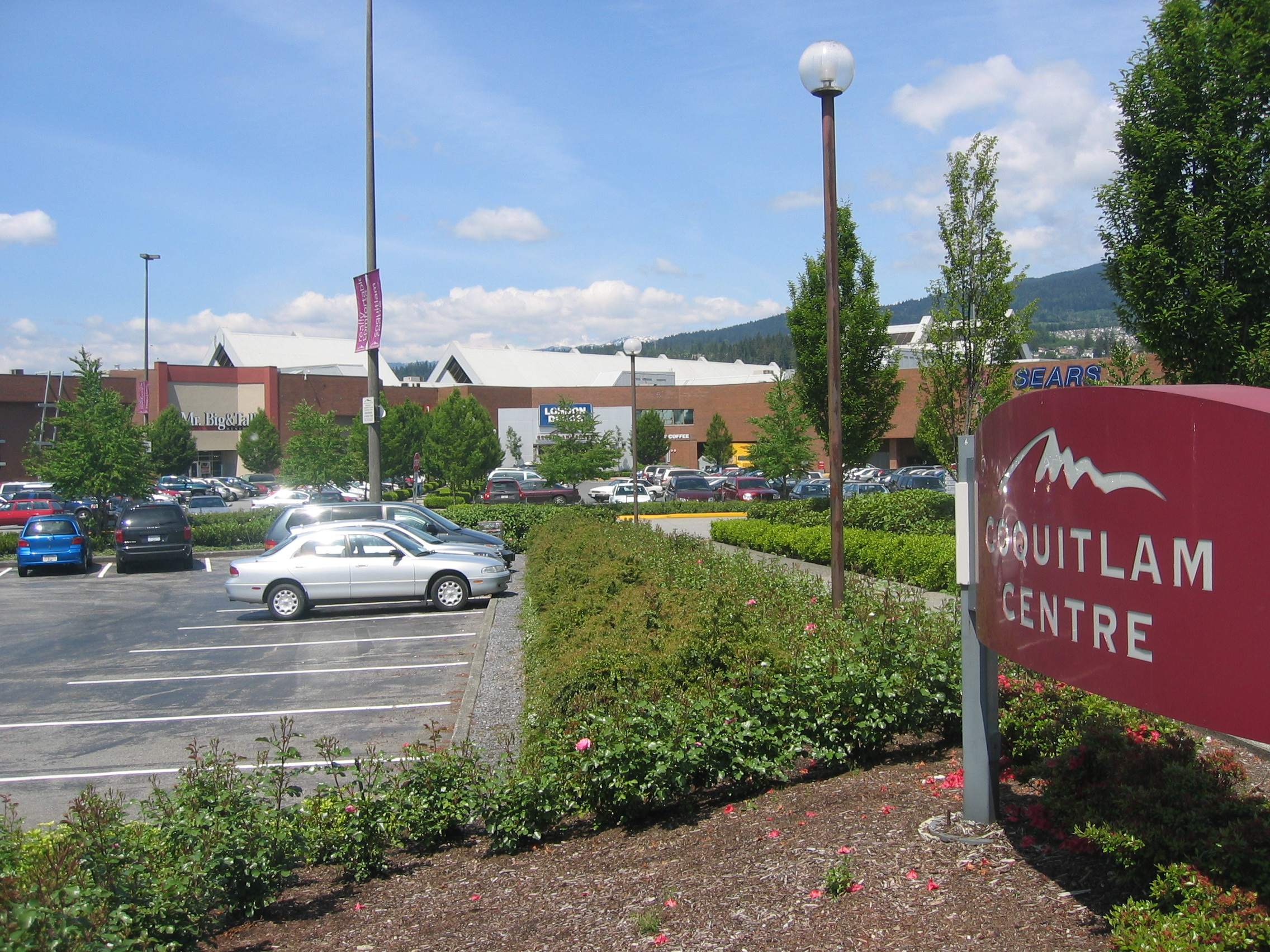
Coquitlam Centre, managed by Morguard

- Bonnie Doon Centre in Edmonton, Alberta
- Sevenoaks Shopping Centre in Abbotsford, British Columbia
- Coquitlam Centre in Coquitlam, British Columbia
- Intercity Shopping Centre in Thunder Bay, Ontario
- Place Rosemere in Rosemere, Quebec
- Lawson Heights Mall in Saskatoon, Saskatchewan

=== Hotels ===
Hotels owned by Morguard as of January 2024
| Hotel | Location | Province | Ownership |
|---|---|---|---|
| Hilton Garden Inn and Homewood Suites | Ottawa | ON | MRC |
| Inn at the Quay | New Westminster | BC | MRC |

=== Offices ===
The following are Morguard-owned office spaces that have an area of at least 500,000 sq ft (46,000 m^{2})

- 750 Burrard Street in Vancouver, British Columbia
- Jean Edmonds Towers in Ottawa, Ontario
- Place Innovation in St. Laurent, Quebec
- Penn West Plaza in Calgary, Alberta (Morguard REIT)
- Rice Howard Place in Edmonton, Alberta (20% ownership)

== See also ==
- Morguard Investments Ltd. v. De Savoye
