= Red Deer Transit =

Municipal public transit system in Alberta, Canada

- Founded: 1966
- Headquarters: Civic Yards: 200, 7721-40 Avenue 52°18′16″N 113°47′22″W
- Locale: Red Deer, Alberta
- Service area: Red Deer, Innisfail, Penhold, Springbrook, Gasoline Alley
- Service type: bus service, paratransit
- Routes: 12 Regular
- Hubs: 3
- Fuel type: Diesel and CNG, switching to CNG
- Operator: The City of Red Deer
- Website: Transit

The Red Deer Transit Department is part of the Community Services Division of the City of Red Deer, which lies midway between Calgary and Edmonton in the province of Alberta, Canada. The city took over operation of the public transit system from private operators in 1966. In 2009 transit service was extended to Springbrook and Gasoline Alley in Red Deer County. In 2014 transit service was extended to Blackfalds and Lacombe to the north. In 2019 transit service was extended to Penhold and Innisfail. In mid 2019 the City of Red Deer announced plans to engage in improvements to the transit network.

== History ==
There are 12 regular bus routes that operate daily. Hours of operation are on Monday to Saturday from 6:15 am to 11:15 pm and on Sundays and Holidays from 8:45 am to 6:45 pm. Exact cash fare, prepaid ticket or pass is required to ride the transit service. Route 50 provides peak hour service to the Edgar Industrial Park. The Riverside Industrial Park is served by Route 51, the main peak hour service provider for this area; various limited service deviations are known as Route 52, 53 and 54.

=== BOLT Transit ===
In 2014, transit service was extended to Lacombe and Blackfalds via BOLT transit, its terminus was Sorrensen Station in Red Deer. Service was suspended on August 28, 2020 and was superseded by BOLT (Blackfalds On-demand Local Transit) in the Town of Blackfalds the following Monday (August 31, 2020).

=== South 2A Transit ===
Additionally, Route 12A provided peak hour service and limited weekend service to Springbrook. In 2019 service was expanded to Innisfail and Penhold and is now provided by South 2A Transit Routes 102/103 instead. The expanded service to Innisfail launched on January 14, 2019 after suspension of Greyhound Canada routes in Western Canada in summer 2018, and was started as a pilot project to replace missing transit links in the province by the Government of Alberta.

=== Moving Red Deer Forward ===
Moving Red Deer Forward: Our Multimodal Transportation Plan was approved by council on July 10, 2017. This plan provided framework for BRT, LRT and HSR corridors through the city.

==== City In Motion: Transit Network Improvements Project ====
The Transit Network Improvements Project will put some of this framework and these policies into practice.

Occurring at the same time as the Transit Network Improvements Project is the cancellation of BOLT Transit on August 30, 2020 and will be replaced by a shuttle service linking Blackfalds and taking advantage of the new Kingston Dr. Hub in Red Deer. The shuttle will be operated by Prairie Bus Lines on behalf of the Town of Blackfalds.

On October 4, 2020 full service levels launched after delays due to the COVID-19 pandemic.

=== Routes Prior to August 23, 2020 ===
Red Deer Transit Routes
No.	Name	Service area	Notes
1	South Hill / Inglewood	Bower Mall, Southpointe Common, Inglewood (South)	
2	Oriole Park / Johnstone Park (South)	Johnstone Park, Oriole Park, Riverside Meadows, Fairview	
3	College / Anders	West Lake, Bethany Care, South Hill, Sunnybrook	
4	Glendale / Kentwood	Village Mall, Highland Green, Glendale, Northwood Estates	
5	Rosedale / Deer Park	Woodlea, Michener Centre, Clearview, Collicutt Centre, Notre Dame High School	
6	Clearview Ridge	Clearview Ridge, Eastview Middle School	
7	Morrisroe / Vanier Woods	Parkvale, Mountview, Deer Park Co-Op, Lancaster	
8	Pines / Normandeau	Parkland Mall, Pines, Normandeau, Kentwood (East)	
9	Eastview / Inglewood	Grandview, Eastview Estates, Deer Park, Collicutt Centre	
10	West Park / Gaetz Ave South	Hospital, Red Deer College, Bower Mall, Westerner	
11	GH Dawe Centre / Johnstone Park	Parkland Mall, G.H. Dawe Community Centre, Johnstone Park (North)	
12	Gasoline Alley	Bower Mall, Gasoline Alley	
20-41	School Special	Varies - School Routes	
50	Edgar Industrial Park	Cronquist Business Park, Highland Green	
51	Riverside Industrial/Olymel	City Centre, Riverside Industrial	
52	Riverside Industrial/Olymel	West Park, Downtown, Highland Green (59 Ave), Glendale, Kentwood (East)	
53	Riverside Industrial/Olymel	Oriole Park, Riverside Meadows, Highland Green, Normandeau	
54	Riverside Industrial/Olymel	Inglewood, Collicut Centre, Morrisroe, Eastview, Bower, South Hill, Parkvale, Waskasoo	
100	BOLT - Express	Red Deer, Lacombe, Blackfalds	BOLT suspended operations on August 28, 2020
101	BOLT - Local	Red Deer, Lacombe, Blackfalds	BOLT suspended operations on August 28, 2020
102	2A South Regional Transit	Red Deer, Innisfail, Penhold	The 2A South Regional Transit Project suspended operations on March 31, 2021.
103	2A South Regional Transit	Red Deer, Innisfail, Penhold, Springbrook	The 2A South Regional Transit Project suspended operations on March 31, 2021.

== Services ==
=== Regular Service ===
Red Deer Transit Regular Routes
Type	No.	Name	Service Area	Frequency
Rapid	1	Gaetz Ave.	**Kingston Dr. Hub,** Parkland Mall, **Sorensen Station,** South Hill, **Bower Hub**	Every 15 during peak Monday to Friday, Every 30 minutes at other times including Weekends and Holidays.
Core	2	Crosstown	**Kingston Dr. Hub,** North East, Agora Campus, South East, **Bower Hub**	Every 30 minutes at all times
Core	3	Hospital – College	**Sorensen Station,** Hospital, RDC, **Bower Hub**	Every 30 minutes at all times
Core	4	Glendale – Southeast	**Kingston Dr. Hub,** North West, **Sorensen Station,** Collicutt Centre, **Bower Hub**	Every 30 minutes at all times
Neighbourhood	10	Rosedale	**Sorensen Station,** Rosedale, Clearview,	Every 30 minutes between 6:15 am and 6:45 pm, Hourly until 10:45 pm Monday to Saturday, Every hour between 11:15 am and 6:15 pm, Sundays and Holidays
Neighbourhood	11	Anders – Vanier Woods	**Sorensen Station,** Mountview, Anders Park, Lancaster, Inglewood, **Bower Hub**	Every 30 minutes between 6:15 am and 6:45 pm, Hourly until 10:45 pm Monday to Saturday, Every hour between 11:15 am and 6:15 pm, Sundays and Holidays
Neighbourhood	12	Gasoline Alley	**Bower Hub,** Gasoline Alley	Every 30 minutes at all times
Neighbourhood	13	West Park – College – Bower	**Sorensen Station,** Capstone at Riverlands, West Park, RDC, Bower, **Bower Hub**	Every 30 minutes at peak, Hourly at other times
Neighbourhood	15	Pines – Normandeau	**Sorensen Station,** Fairview, Highland Green, Pines, Parkland Mall	Every 30 minutes at peak, Hourly at other times
Neighbourhood	16	Oriole Park	**Sorensen Station,** Oriole Park, Riverside Meadows	Every 30 minutes at peak, Hourly at other times
Commuter	18	Riverside Industrial	**Sorensen Station,** Riverside Industrial	Every 30 minutes during weekday peak only (excluding holidays)
Commuter	19	Edgar Industrial	**Kingston Dr. Hub,** Edgar Industrial	Every 30 minutes during weekday peak only (excluding holidays)
South 2A Transit	102	South 2A	**Bower Hub,** Innisfail, Penhold, Springbrook	Every hour and 30 minutes during morning peak Every hour and hour and 30 minutes during afternoon peak
South 2A Transit	103	South 2A	**Bower Hub,** Innisfail, Penhold, Springbrook	Every hour and 30 minutes during morning peak Every hour and hour and 30 minutes during afternoon peak

=== School Service ===
Red Deer Transit provides Peak Overload services to the Red Deer Public School District as well as Red Deer Catholic Regional Schools for certain middle schools and all high schools in Red Deer.

Red Deer Transit School Routes
School	No.	Name	Service Area
Lindsay Thurber Comprehensive High School	20	Oriole Park – Fairview	Oriole Park, Fairview, **LTCHS**
Lindsay Thurber Comprehensive High School	21	Glendale – Normandeau – Highland Green	Glendale, Normandeau, Highland Green, **LTCHS**
Lindsay Thurber Comprehensive High School	22	Pines – Kentwood – Normandeau	Pines, Kentwood, Normandeau, **LTCHS**
Lindsay Thurber Comprehensive High School	23	Clearview – Rosedale – Deer Park – Eastview	Clearview, Rosedale, Deer Park, Eastview, **LTCHS**
Lindsay Thurber Comprehensive High School	24	Morrisroe – Sunnybrook – Deer Park – Anders – Lancaster	Morrisroe, Sunnybrook, Deer Park, Anders, Lancaster, **LTCHS**
Lindsay Thurber Comprehensive High School	25	Kentwood – Johnstone – Oriole Park – Riverside Meadows	Kentwood, Johnstone, Oriole Park, Riverside Meadows, **LTCHS**
Hunting Hills High School Notre Dame High School	26	West Park – Bower	West Park, Bower, **HHHS, NDHS**
Hunting Hills High School Notre Dame High School	27	Eastview – Clearview – Rosedale – Deer Park	Eastview, Clearview, Rosedale, Deer Park, **HHHS, NDHS**
Eastview Middle School	28	Eastview – Clearview – Rosedale – Deer Park	Eastview, Clearview, Rosedale, Deer Park, **EMS**
Hunting Hills High School Notre Dame High School	29	City Centre	**Sorensen Station, HHHS, NDHS**
Gateway Christian School	30	City Centre	**Sorensen Station, GCS**
Agora Campus St. Joseph High School	31	City Centre	**Sorensen Station, SJHS**
Central Middle School	32	Timberlands – Clearview – Garden Heights – Pines – Normandeau	Timberlands, Clearview, Garden Heights, Pines, Normandeau, **CMS**
Lindsay Thurber Comprehensive High School	33	City Centre	**Sorensen Station, LTCHS**
Agora Campus St. Joseph High School	34	Highland Green – Normandeau – Pines	Highland Green, Normandeau, Pines, **SJHS**
Central Middle School	35/35A	Oriole Park – Riverside Meadows – Fairview	Oriole Park, Riverside Meadows, Fairview, **CMS**
Central Middle School	36	City Centre	**Sorensen Station, CMS**
Agora Campus St. Joseph High School	37	Clearview – Timberlands – Rosedale	Clearview, Timberlands, Rosedale, **SJHS**
Agora Campus St. Joseph High School	38	Eastview – Deer Park – Clearview	Eastview, Deer Park, Clearview, **SJHS**
Eastview Middle School	39	Anders – Lancaster – Deer Park – Morrisroe	Anders Lancaster Deer Park Morrisroe, **EMS**
Agora Campus St. Joseph High School	40	Johnstone – Kentwood	Johnstone, Kentwood, **SJHS**
Agora Campus St. Joseph High School	41	Glendale – Kentwood – Normandeau	Glendale, Kentwood, Normandeau, **SJHS**

=== Olymel/Riverside Service ===
Red Deer Transit Olymel Routes
No.	Name	Service Area (Bold indicates Terminus)
52	West Park – City Centre – Kentwood	West Park, City Centre, Highland Green, Glendale, Kentwood, **Olymel**
53	Oriole Park – Highland Green – Normandeau	Oriole Park, Riverside Meadows, Highland Green, Normandeau, **Olymel**
54	Inglewood – Mountview – Parkvale	Inglewood, Collicutt Centre, Morrisroe, Eastview, Bower, South Hill, Parkvale, Waskasoo, **Olymel**

=== Transit Hubs ===
Sorensen Station

General information
- Location: 4914-48 Avenue
- Coordinates: 52°16′04″N 113°48′39″W

Construction
- Parking: 300 monthly 100 daily

History
- Opened: August 1, 2010
Location

==== Sorensen Station ====
The city owned transit terminal and parkade is located on the southwest corner of 49 Street and 49 Avenue. The facility includes a customer service centre and a three-storey parkade with over 400 parking spaces.

Part of the Transit Network Improvements Project was to establish new locations for transfers outside the Greater Downtown, these hubs are:

==== Bower Hub ====
Located on Bennett St. at the Bower Place Shopping Centre, it is the networks southernmost terminus.

==== Kingston Dr. Hub ====
Located on street at the intersection of Gaetz Ave. and Kingston Dr. in the northern neighbourhood of Kentwood.
