= William Culham Woodward =

Canadian businessman (1885–1957)

The Honourable William Culham Woodward
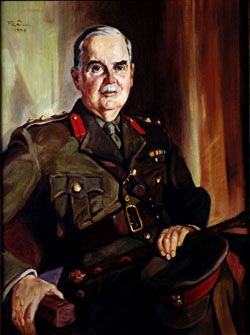
- William Culham Woodward

16th Lieutenant Governor of British Columbia
- In office August 29, 1941 – October 1, 1946
- Monarch: George VI
- Governors General: The Earl of Athlone; The Viscount Alexander of Tunis
- Premier: Duff Pattullo; John Hart
- Preceded by: Eric Hamber
- Succeeded by: Charles Arthur Banks

Personal details
- Born: April 24, 1885 Gore Bay, Ontario
- Died: February 24, 1957 (aged 71) Hawaii, USA
- Spouse: Ruth Wynn-Johnson (m. 1921)
- Relations: Charles A. Woodward (father)
- Children: Charles N. "Chunky" Woodward Sydney Elizabeth “Fifi” Russ
- Occupation: Businessman
- Profession: Politician

William Culham Woodward, also known as Billy Woodward and Willy Woodward, (April 24, 1885 – February 24, 1957) was a member of a successful merchandising family in Vancouver, British Columbia, Canada. Heir to the Woodward's department store chain founded by his father Charles A. Woodward in 1891, he started out in 1907 as a bookkeeper for the store, ultimately rising to become company president in 1937 upon his father's death. He was succeeded in that capacity by his son, Charles N. "Chunky" Woodward in 1956.

Among the many other positions Woodward held were Charter Member of the Board of the Bank of Canada from its founding in March, 1935; President of the Vancouver Board of Trade; Life Governor of the Vancouver General Hospital; Founder and Patron of the Vancouver Little Theatre. During World War I, he served overseas in the First Canadian Heavy Artillery. Woodward was, like his father, a member of the Grand Lodge of British Columbia and Yukon of the International Order of Freemasonry.

Woodward served as the 16th Lieutenant Governor of British Columbia from 1941 to 1946.
