= Qualex-Landmark =

Canadian property development group

- Type: Private
- Industry: Real estate development
- Headquarters: Vancouver, British Columbia, Canada
- Website: http://www.qualex.ca/

Qualex-Landmark is a Canadian real estate development group based in Vancouver, British Columbia. The company develops condominium, rental and mixed-use projects including Pomaria in Vancouver, Park Point in Calgary, and Artesia in Burnaby. The company was founded in 2001.

Qualex-Landmark's projects have been designed by architects such as Foad Rafii, RWA Group, IBI Group, and James Cheng. Some developments have received regional architecture and development awards, including recognition from the Urban Development Institute.

Qualex-Landmark developed close to 1300 units across 6 residential high rise developments in Calgary, Alberta between the years of 2006 and 2018, leading to the moniker the "King of the Beltline." Mark on Tenth has a large-scale art commission by Canadian visual artist and designer Douglas Coupland, Coupland's interpretation of Calgary, Alberta in the 21st century.

Qualex-Landmark also developed residential projects in Vancouver's Yaletown neighbourhood, including Domus and Pomaria, comprising more than 350 housing units combined. Pomaria includes a copper and steel weathervane by Canadian artist and musician Rodney Graham.

== Developments ==
- 701 Kingsway - rental tower in Vancouver, BC. Among first wave of development under City of Vancouver's 2022-approved Broadway plan, as noted by Daily Hive. Under construction.
- Ironwood in Coquitlam, BC. Under construction.
  - Below-market rental portion delivered in Partnership with the YWCA
  - Designed by Order of Canada decorated architect James K. M. Cheng
  - Features public art by Marie Khouri
- Botanica in Coquitlam, BC. Under construction.
- Artesia in Burnaby, BC - 2025
  - Below-market rental portion delivered in partnership with the YWCA
  - Daily Hive reported on its public art commissioned by Random International
- Seasons residential rental in Coquitlam, BC - 2024
  - Urban Development Institute Award for Best Multi-Family Rental, 2024
- Legacy on Dunbar in Vancouver, BC - 2023
- Green on Queensbury in North Vancouver, BC's Moodyville - 2020
  - LEED Platinum certification, 2021
  - Fronting Moodyville Park, revitalized in collaboration with the City of North Vancouver, including the "Queensbury Frog" sculpture carved by artist Eric Neighbour
- Park Point in Calgary, AB - 2018
- Aria rental in Vancouver, BC - 2016
  - Urban Development Institute Award for Best Multi-Family Rental
  - LEED Gold certification
- Mark on Tenth in Calgary, AB - 2016
- Calla in Calgary, AB - 2013
- Luna in Calgary, AB - 2012
- District Crossing in North Vancouver, BC - 2011
- Nova in Calgary, AB - 2008
- Pomaria in Vancouver, BC - 2007
  - Urban Development Institute award for Best High Rise, 2007
  - First LEED-certified multi-unit residential building in Vancouver
- Stella in Calgary, AB - 2006
- Domus in Vancouver, BC - 2003

=== Founder Developments Prior to Qualex-Landmark (Active from 1991) ===
These include Alda, Crandall, Symphony at Garibaldi, Symphony at Whistler, Eighteen Trees, Sinclaire Dental Headquarters, Rivergate, Sonesta, Antrim Oaks, The Esplanade, Fairmont on the Boulevard, and The Beacon.
