= Chunky Woodward =

Canadian retailer and rancher

Charles Nanby Wynn "Chunky" Woodward (March 23, 1924 – April 27, 1990) was a prominent Canadian retailer and rancher, son of William C. Woodward, Lieutenant Governor of British Columbia from 1941 to 1946, and grandson of Charles A. Woodward, the founder of the Woodward's department store chain, which was dissolved in 1993. Like his father and grandfather, "Chunky" served as president of Woodward's stores but is equally famous as long-time owner of the Douglas Lake Ranch, the world's second-largest rank, and was a noted horsebreeder. He was born in Vancouver in 1924 and died there in 1990.
