= Bramalea City Centre =

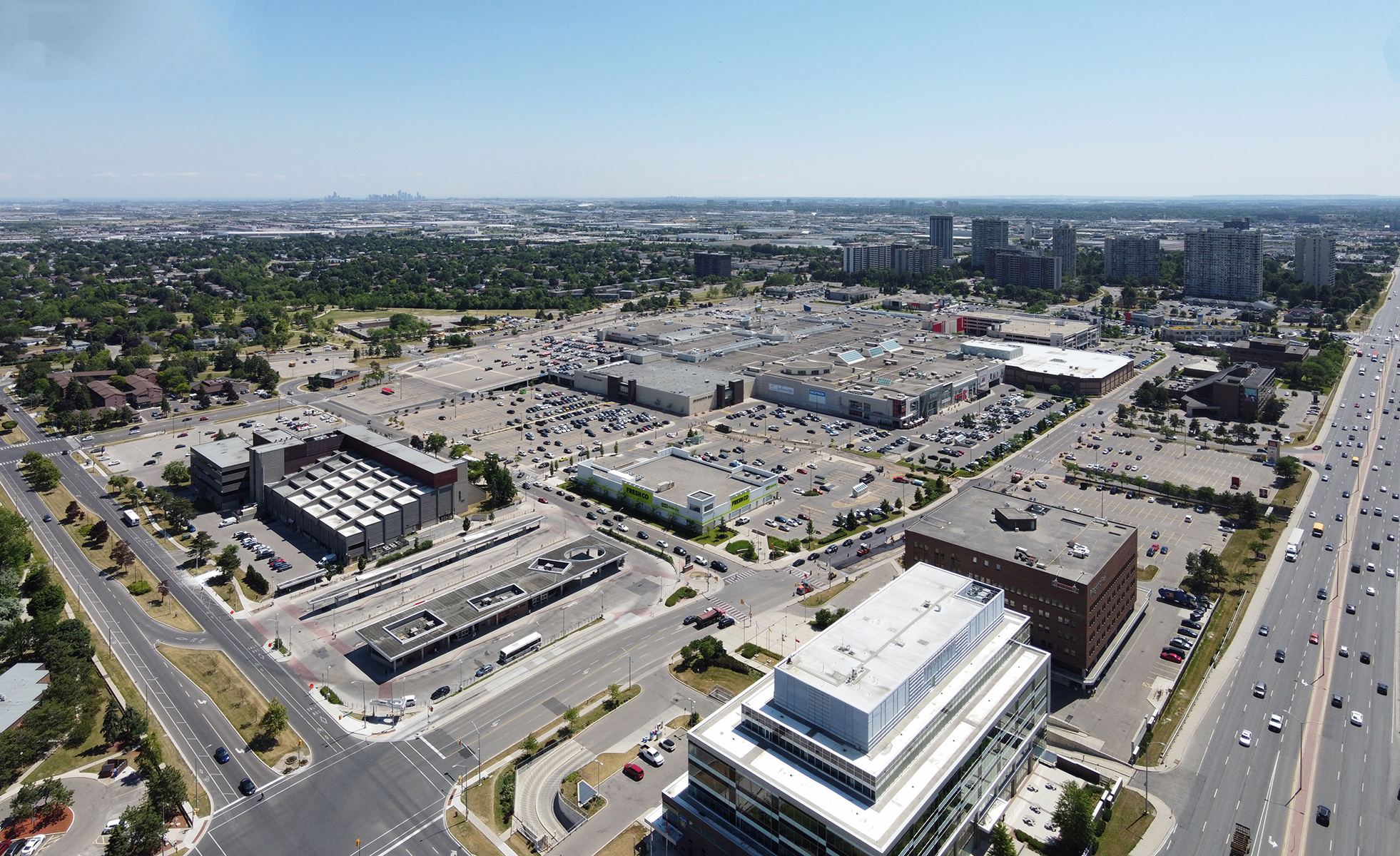
- Mall aerial view (2022)
- Location: Brampton, Ontario, Canada
- Coordinates: 43.716589°N 79.723921°W
- Address: 25 Peel Centre Drive
- Opened: March 28, 1973
- Developer: Bramalea Limited
- Manager: Morguard Investments Limited
- Owner: Morguard Investments Limited
- Num. of stores: 300+
- Num. of anchor tenants: 3
- Floor area: 85 acres (0.34 km^{2}; 0.133 sq mi)
- Floors: 2
- Parking: 6385
- Public transit: Bramalea Terminal
- Website: bramaleacitycentre.com

The Bramalea City Centre (BCC) is a large shopping mall located in the city of Brampton, Ontario, Canada. Built in the 1960s, it includes more than 300 outlets, and is regarded as one of Canada's largest shopping malls with a retail space of over 1.5 million square feet. The mall would be named after the Bramalea neighbourhood. Ownership of the mall would be transferred following the liquidation of Bramalea Ltd to Toronto-Dominion Bank. Considered as a super regional mall, the Bramalea City Centre has a market of more than 500,000 residents and attracts 16 million visitors annually. It is located near the intersection of Queen Street and Dixie Road, east of Highway 410.

== History ==
=== 1960s–1970s: Planning and construction ===
In the 1960s, planners in what was then Chinguacousy Township implemented a master plan to develop a new town called Bramalea. Included in this master plan was a series of residential areas, industrial development, open parks, and among other things, a central shopping centre. An 85-acre site, situated in the heart of Bramalea, was designated for mall development. Bramalea Consolidated Developments Limited (later shortened to Bramalea Limited in 1976), the local real estate developer responsible for developing much of Bramalea since the late 1950s, began mall construction towards the end of the decade on what was then the largest retail development in North America.

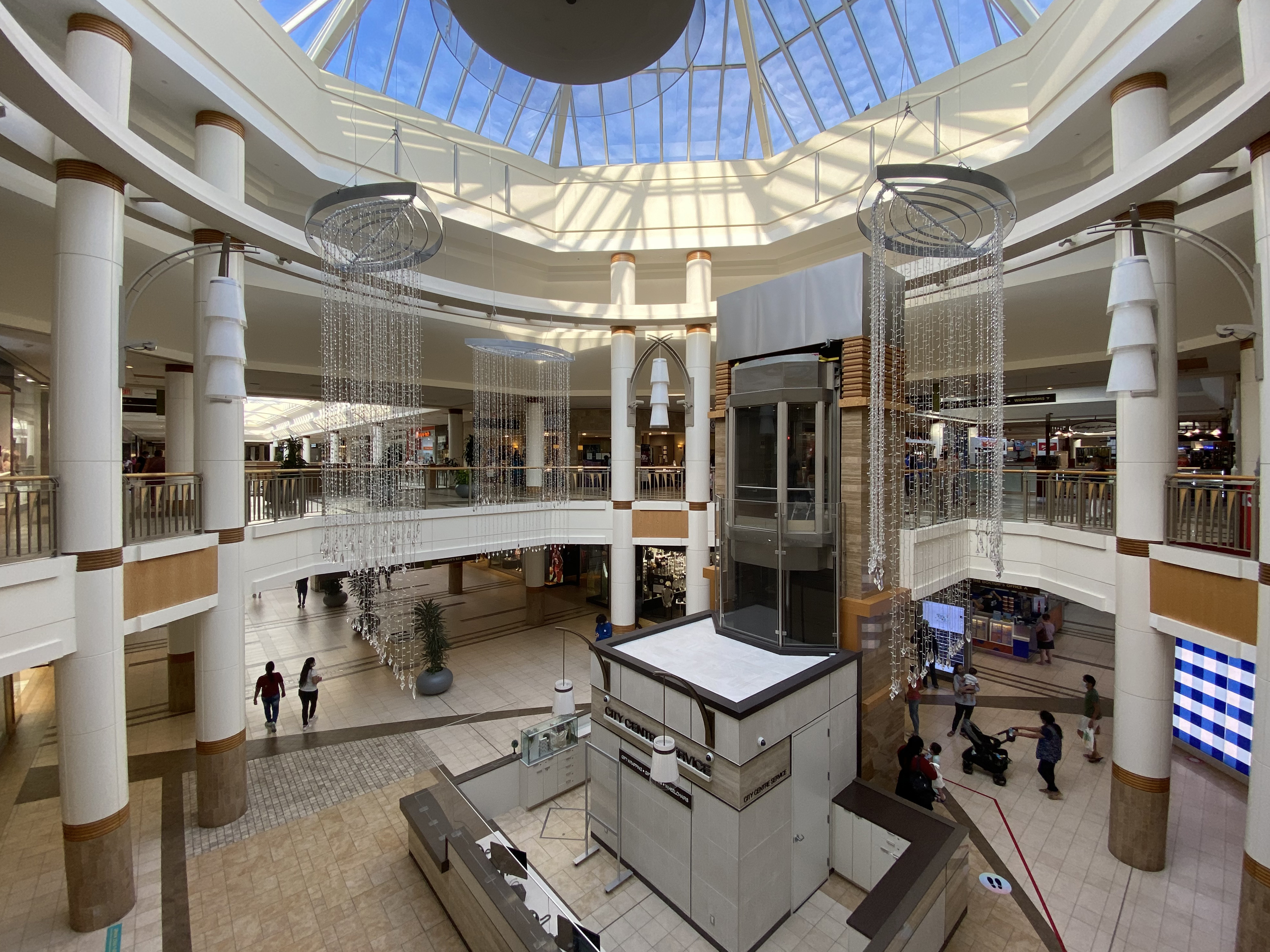
Atrium of the mall

The first phase of construction entailed the "service centre" portion of the mall at the north end, about 75,000 square feet consisting of a Food City grocery store, LCBO, and various other small shops and offices, completed by 1971. The second phase added 600,000 square feet of mall space, including a two-level Eaton's (120,000 square feet total, officially opened October 7, 1971 while the rest of the mall was still under construction), the two-level main mall corridor of 300,000 square feet stretching east to another anchor store yet to have a tenant (The Bay would end up occupying this space, with 131,000 square feet on two levels), and Steinberg's retail space to the south, consisting of an 80,000-square-foot Miracle Mart department store and a 20,000-square-foot Miracle Food Mart supermarket, both next to each other on the upper level (later operated together as a Miracle Beaucoup).

Construction was completed in 1973, as the surrounding landscape experienced rapid change as the result of a population boom. The Bramalea City Centre had its grand opening on March 28, 1973. Initially opening with 160 outlets, Bramalea City Centre housed various retail stores, large anchor store tenants, grocery stores, restaurants and even a hardware store and a movie theatre (Bramalea Cinemas, closed in the late 1980s when Odeon moved to Gateway 6 Cinemas). The nearby Bramalea Civic Centre was also constructed around this time in the early 1970s, currently housing Toronto Metropolitan University's School of Medicine; it formerly hosted various municipal government offices, a theatre and the Brampton Public Library's Chinguacousy branch.

=== 1980s–1990s: Mall expansion ===
Although Chinguacousy Township was amalgamated with Brampton in 1974, the Bramalea City Centre retained the name of the satellite community in which it was built. Mall expansion continued throughout the 1980s and 1990s under Bramalea Limited and Trizec Corporation (under Trilea Centers Inc) ownership and operation, including a northwest wing extension for the present Sears store location, and new bus terminal in 1991. A $6.5-million 150-room Holiday Inn hotel (started construction in 1978, owned by Bramalea Ltd and run by Holiday Inn), various separate external stores, and the Region of Peel office buildings were built within the malls' site boundaries, but were not directly connected to the main mall.

In the early 1990s, Bramalea Limited had undergone financial hardships that forced the company to liquidate its real estate holdings, and eventually the company went into bankruptcy in April 1995, and a number of creditors acquired various real estate holdings. Ownership of the Bramalea City Centre, completely owned by Bramalea Ltd at the time had gone to the Toronto-Dominion Bank. In 1997, shareholder Gentra Inc. bought the rest of TD's stake in the mall. In 2002, the Bramalea City Centre was acquired by its current joint owners, Canadian real estate firm Morguard Corporation and a third party institutional investor.

=== 2004–2010: Reconstruction and expansion ===
In 2004, the mall would go through a $165-million reconstruction to improve all common areas. The renovation was completed within eight months. Upper and ground level corridors at the southwest end of the mall mainly composed of smaller tenant stores were removed in favour of larger store space occupying these areas for Old Navy, Shoppers Drug Mart, and Best Buy.

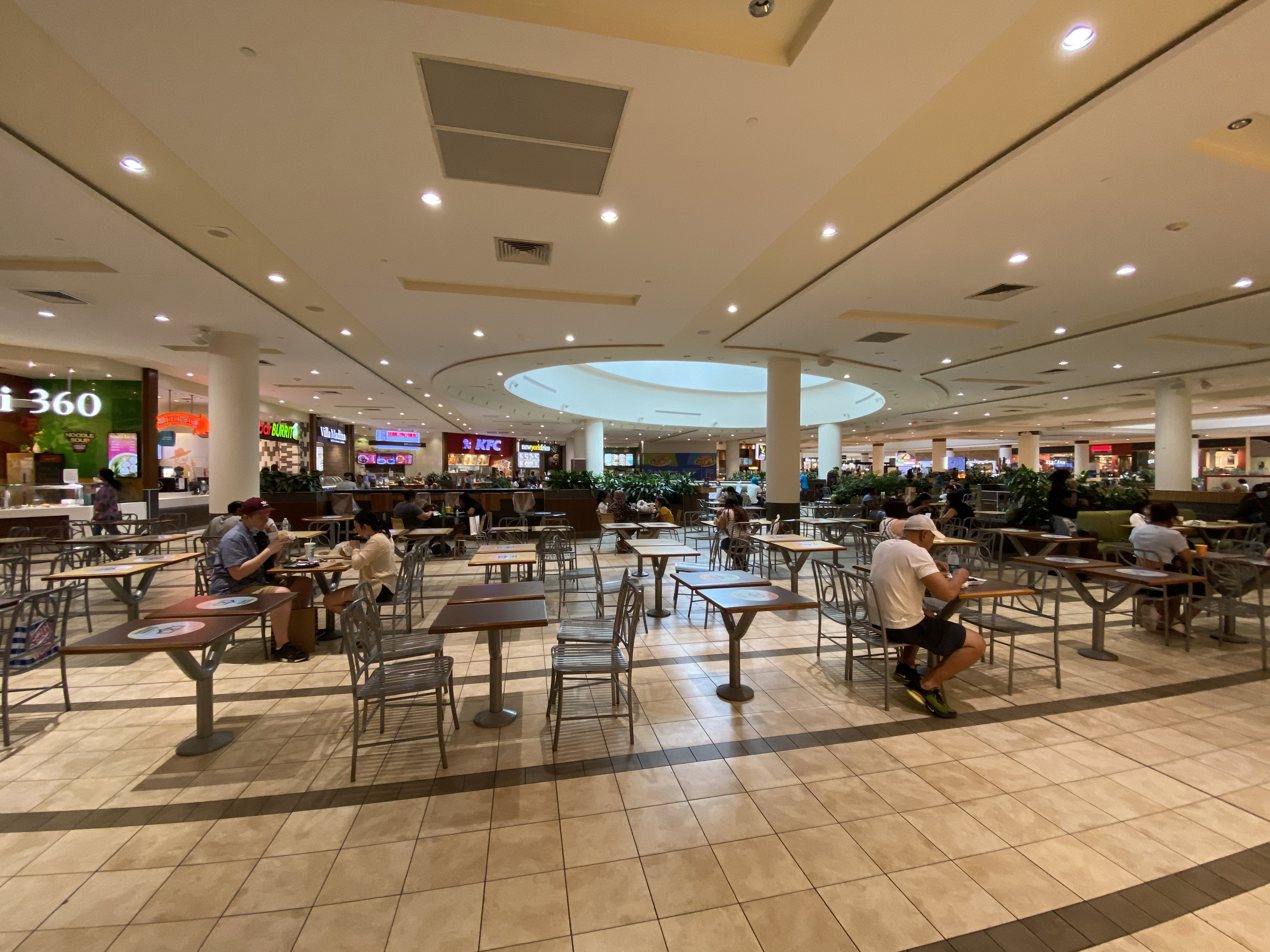
South Food Court

Additional renovation projects were carried out in 2005 and 2006, revamping the food court, escalators, and other areas of the mall. Petroff Partnership Architects was in charge of the redesign; construction was carried out by Vanbots Construction.

Another $165-million expansion project opened in September 2010. It created 417,292 square feet (38,767.7 m2) of underground parking space, six new pad buildings constructed on the property, 325,000 square feet (30,200 m2) of new retail area on two levels, a new architectural centerpiece at the northwest corner of the property, and relocated loading docks and chiller units.

=== 2023–present: Recent history ===
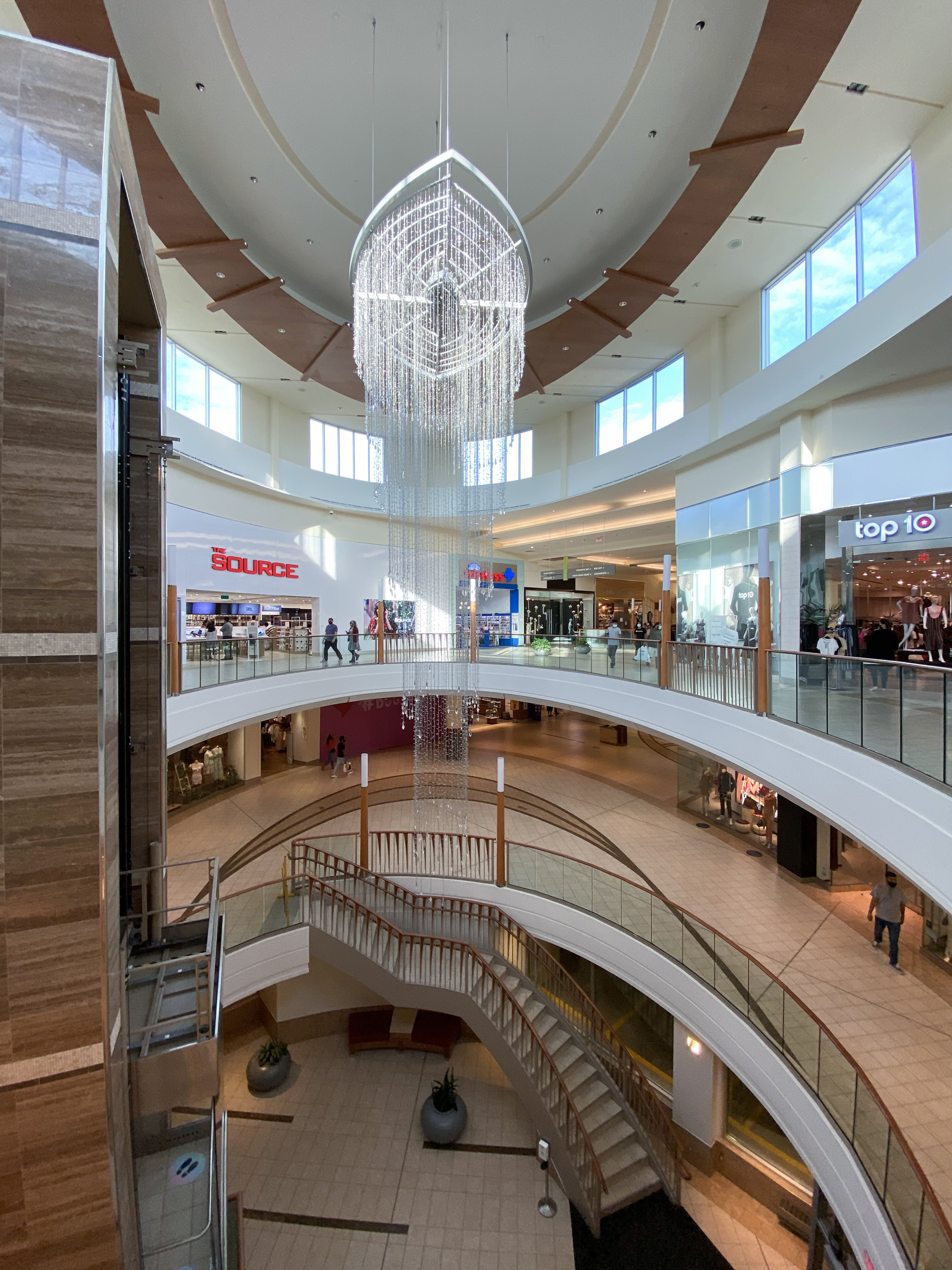
Northwest corner is the expansion area of the mall

The mall has housed several large retailers in the past. These include Hudson's Bay (closed 2025), Sears (closed 2018), Eaton's, Kmart (closed 1998), Decathlon (closed 2025), Designer Depot (closed 2026), Zellers (closed 2012), Target (closed 2015), Home Outfitters, Miracle Mart, Food City, and Beaver Lumber. It currently hosts tenants including Walmart, FreshCo, Sport Check, Aritzia, American Eagle Outfitters, Shoppers Drug Mart, Kitchen Stuff Plus, Urban Planet, Forever 21, Dollarama, Metro (formerly A&P), Uniqlo, Hollister Co., H&M, and restaurants located in and outside the food court. Brampton Transit's Bramalea Terminal was moved in 2010 from its original site on the southeast side of the mall to a location to the north, to accommodate the Züm bus rapid transit service on Queen Street.

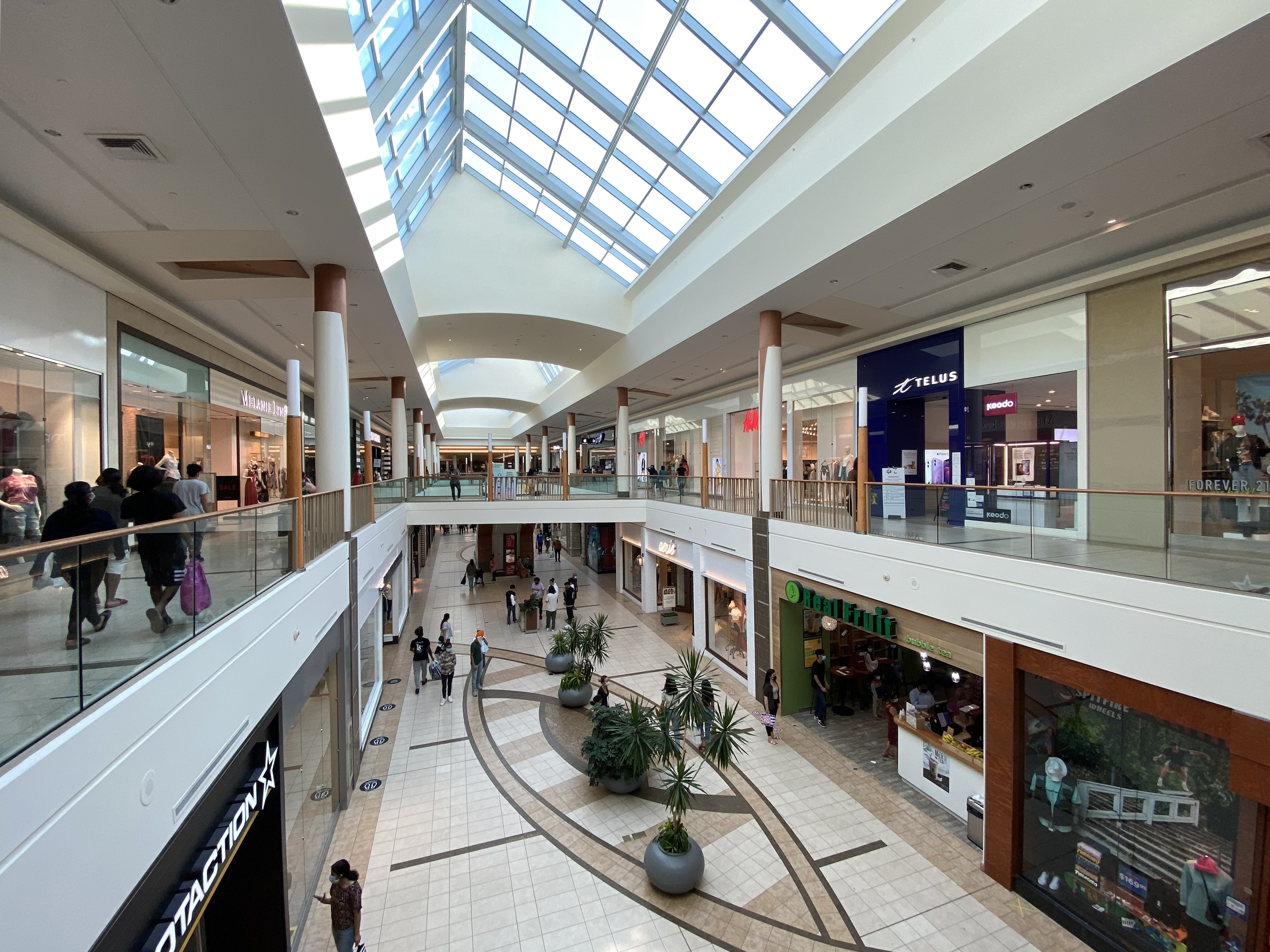
Upper Level of shopping mall

In addition, the Bramalea Retirement Residence is located near the mall at a former Holiday Inn. In May 2023, the mall would celebrate its 50th anniversary by opening a time capsule that was kept dormant since 1998. Owners of the mall would also announce a renovation of the South Food Court.

== See also ==
- List of largest enclosed shopping malls in Canada
- List of shopping malls in Canada
