= Place Rosemère =

Shopping mall in Rosemère, Quebec, Canada

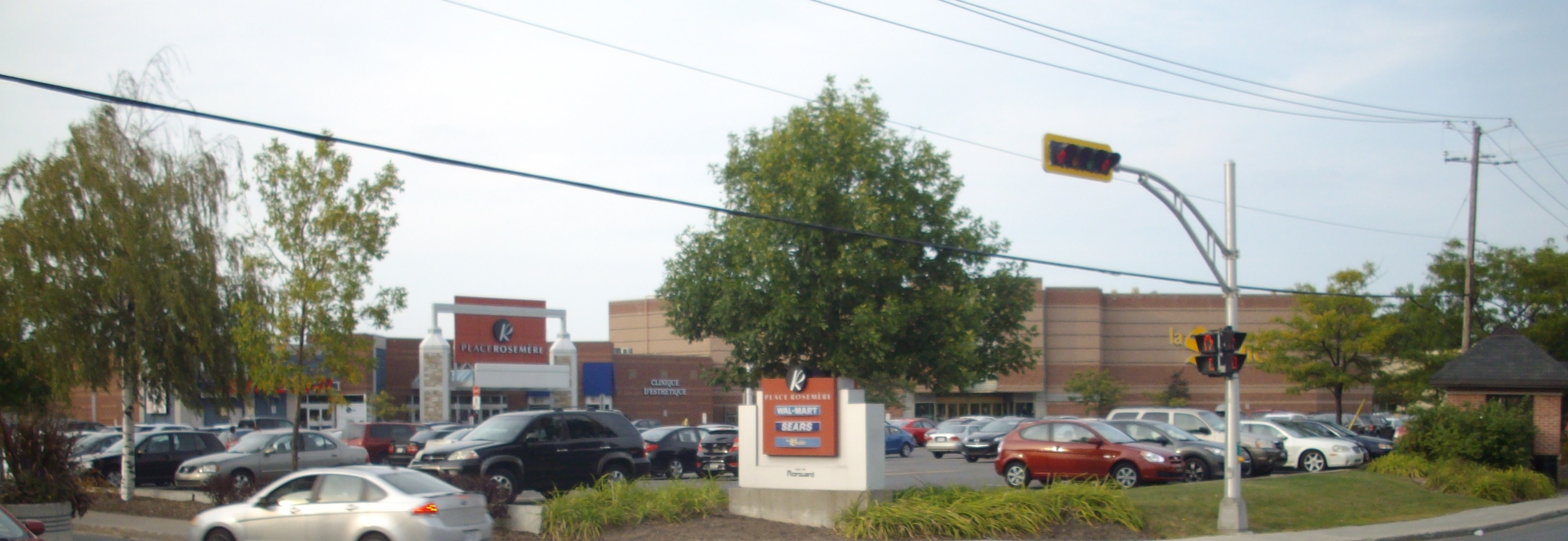
- The mall as of September 2012
- Coordinates: 45.63°N 73.82°W
- Address: 401, boulevard Curé-Labelle; Rosemère, Quebec, Canada; J7A 3T2
- Opened: August 13, 1975
- Manager: Morguard Investments
- Num. of stores: 200
- Num. of anchor tenants: 3
- Floor area: approx. 890,715 sq ft (82,750.1 m^{2})
- Floors: 1
- Website: placerosemere.com

Place Rosemère is a super regional mall in Rosemère, Quebec, Canada. It is near the intersection of Quebec Autoroute 640 and Quebec Autoroute 15. Its anchor stores are Walmart and Best Buy. It has 200 stores, including a food court of thirteen restaurants. Place Rosemère is operated by Morguard Investments.

Place Rosemère began modestly when it first opened in August 1975, with approximately 65 stores at 337,000 sq ft (31,300 m^{2}) anchored by Woolco, Beaver Lumber and Dominion. The Hudson's Bay Company had planned a La Baie store for the ianguration of the mall, but nothing ever came out of this announcement and it's only on March 13, 1991, that it opened at Place Rosemère.

Dominion was acquired by Provigo on June 15, 1981, and Woolco by Wal-Mart in 1995.

The mall was purchased by Morguard in late 1986.

A first expansion, opened in 1991, brought to the mall to 90 stores along with the newly opened La Baie store of 140,000 sq ft (13,000 m^{2}). The mall itself reached 605,667 sq ft (56,268.3 m^{2}) and almost doubled its floor area. This expansion also relocated the Canadian Tire store into the new section.

Another expansion, opened on September 19, 2002, brought the mall to its current size and layout as Wal-Mart relocated to a new location earlier in February 2002 and a new Sears store moved to the old Wal-Mart store. This expansion coincided with the closing of two other anchor stores when Canadian Tire moved to a standalone location across the street and Provigo, one of the last supermarkets to be located in a Canadian regional mall, closed its doors. Some smaller stores took the place of the old Canadian Tire store, and Zara, Pharmaprix and Dormez-Vous took the place of the old Provigo store.

A new Best Buy store opened on November 13, 2008.

== See also ==
- List of largest shopping malls in Canada
- List of shopping malls in Montreal
