= Kent Street (Ottawa) =

Street in Ottawa, Canada

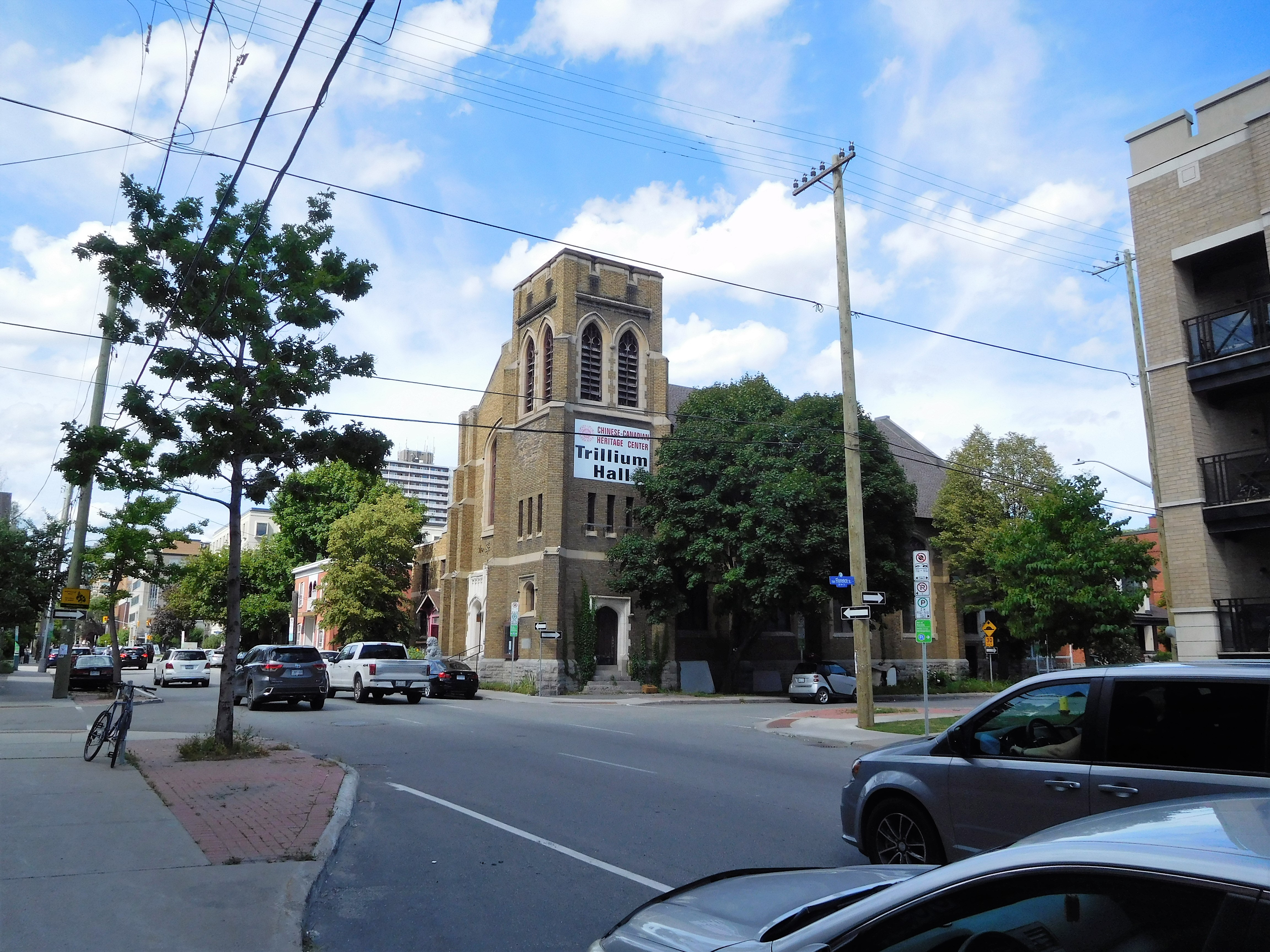
Kent St. and Florence St. intersection

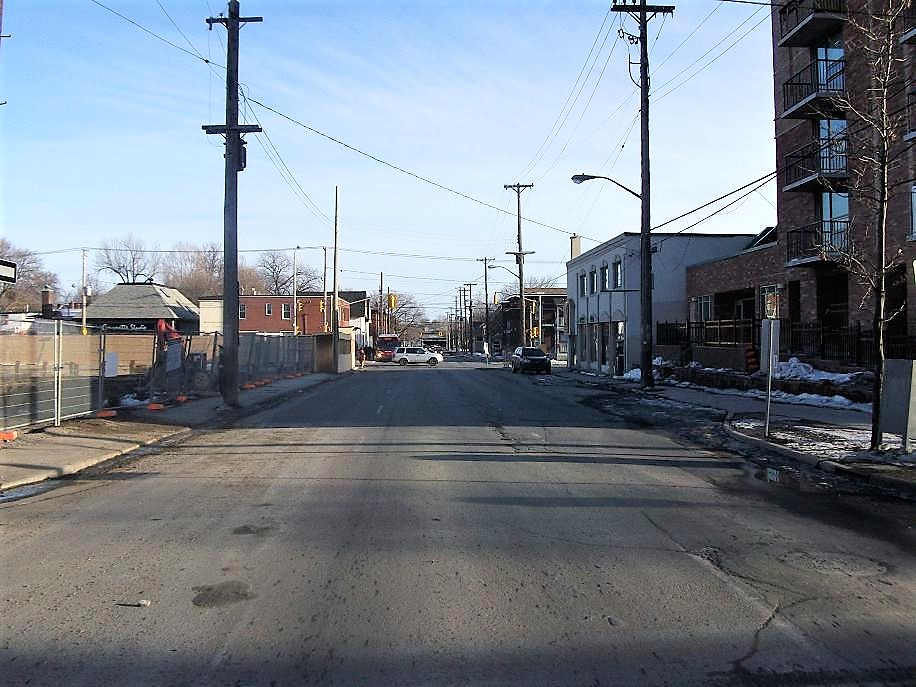
Kent St. looking south from Florence St.

Kent Street is a major street in downtown Ottawa, Ontario, Canada. One block west of Bank Street, Kent is one way running north. It begins at the Queensway at the south and ends at Wellington Street. The street has fewer storefronts than Bank Street. South of downtown it is mainly small and medium-sized office buildings, with some restaurants and residences. The northern part of the street is home to several large office towers, mainly governmental. It was originally known as Hugh Street.

With the opening of the Queensway, Kent became a one-way street in 1963.

Some of the buildings or other key sites located along Kent Street (although the address is not necessarily registered on it) includes:

- Supreme Court of Canada, located north of Wellington Street
- East Memorial Building
- Sparks Street Mall, although not the commercial core
- C.D. Howe Building (at Queen Street)
- Place de Ville (towers A & B)
- Ottawa Marriott Hotel
- Minto Place (last tower)
- Jean Edmonds Towers (east side between Slater and Laurier)
- Constitution Square (west side between Albert and Slater)
- St. Patrick's Basilica
- Ottawa Central Bus Station, located near Highway 417

== See also ==
- Royal eponyms in Canada
