= Sevenoaks Shopping Centre =

Shopping mall complex in British Columbia, Canada

Coordinates: 49.04905°N 122.31181°W

Sevenoaks Shopping Centre is a shopping mall complex in Abbotsford, British Columbia, Canada. Sevenoaks has over 100 retail stores, services and food establishments.

Sevenoaks is located approximately one hour east of Vancouver, and minutes from two U.S. border crossings. Sevenoaks Shopping Centre was built in 1975; expansions occurred in 1984, 1989, 1991 and 1999-2000. During the 1991 expansion, a Water Clock was purchased and added to the mall, this was moved to the Abbotsford International Airport in 2000 due to maintenance issues. It has over 560,000 square feet (52,000 m^{2}) of retail and services that serve the Fraser Valley. It is managed by Morguard.

== Anchor tenants ==
- Sport Chek 24,372 square feet (2,264.2 m^{2})
- Best Buy 31,908 square feet (2,964.4 m^{2})
- Royal Bank of Canada
- London Drugs
- Dollarama
- Shoppers Drug Mart
- Petland
- Meridian Farm Market

== Former Anchors ==
- Kmart (closed 1998)
- Sears 136,157 square feet (12,649.4 m^{2}) (closed September 2017) to be replaced by Ardene
- Parisotto's Your Independent Grocer 48,483 square feet (4,504.2 m^{2}) (Closed September 2018)
- Hudson's Bay 132,062 square feet (12,269.0 m^{2}) (Closed June 2025)
- Eaton's (closed 1999) since 1975
- Woodward's Food Floor - since 1975 (closed 1993)

== See also ==
- Abbotsford, British Columbia
- List of shopping malls in Canada
