= Charles A. Woodward =

Canadian politician

MLA for Vancouver City
- In office 1924–1928

Personal details
- Born: July 19, 1852 Gore, Beverley Township, Canada West
- Died: June 2, 1937 (aged 84) Vancouver, British Columbia, Canada
- Party: Liberal Party of British Columbia
- Children: William Culham Woodward; Percival Woodward
- Occupation: businessman

Charles A. Woodward (July 19, 1852 – June 2, 1937) was the founder of Woodward's Department Stores Limited and the father of William C. "Billy" Woodward, who became Lieutenant Governor of British Columbia from 1941 to 1946, and grandfather of Charles N. "Chunky" Woodward, who like his father and grandfather served as president of Woodward's Stores and became long-time owner of the Douglas Lake Cattle Company in the Nicola Valley. In addition to William C., had another son, Percival ("Puggy").

== Biography ==
Born in a backwoods farm in Gore, Beverley Township, Ontario, he left home to become a storekeeper and in 1875 established his first store on Manitoulin Island. He moved to British Columbia in 1891 and in 1892 established his first store in Vancouver at Main and Georgia Streets in what is now Chinatown. On September 12 of that year, he opened a new store location at Hastings and Abbott Streets, incorporating Woodward's Department Stores Ltd in doing so. The store prospered greatly during the Klondike Gold Rush (1898-1903). Other stores followed in later years, beginning with Edmonton in 1926 and by 1975 totalling eighteen stores, making it the largest retailer in Western Canada. The building housing the flagship store is preserved and renovated as the Woodward's Building and remains a landmark within the city of Vancouver.

In 1924, he was elected to the Legislative Assembly of British Columbia representing the Vancouver City riding as part of the Liberal Party of British Columbia government of John Oliver. In that election, he placed first among the 27 candidates vying for 6 positions in the Vancouver City riding. He did not seek re-election in the 1928 provincial election.

A member of the Acacia Lodge of the Grand Lodge of British Columbia of the International Order of Freemasonry, Woodward is interred in the only mausoleum to be found in the Masonic Cemetery in the Vancouver suburb of Burnaby.
