= North Shore Square =

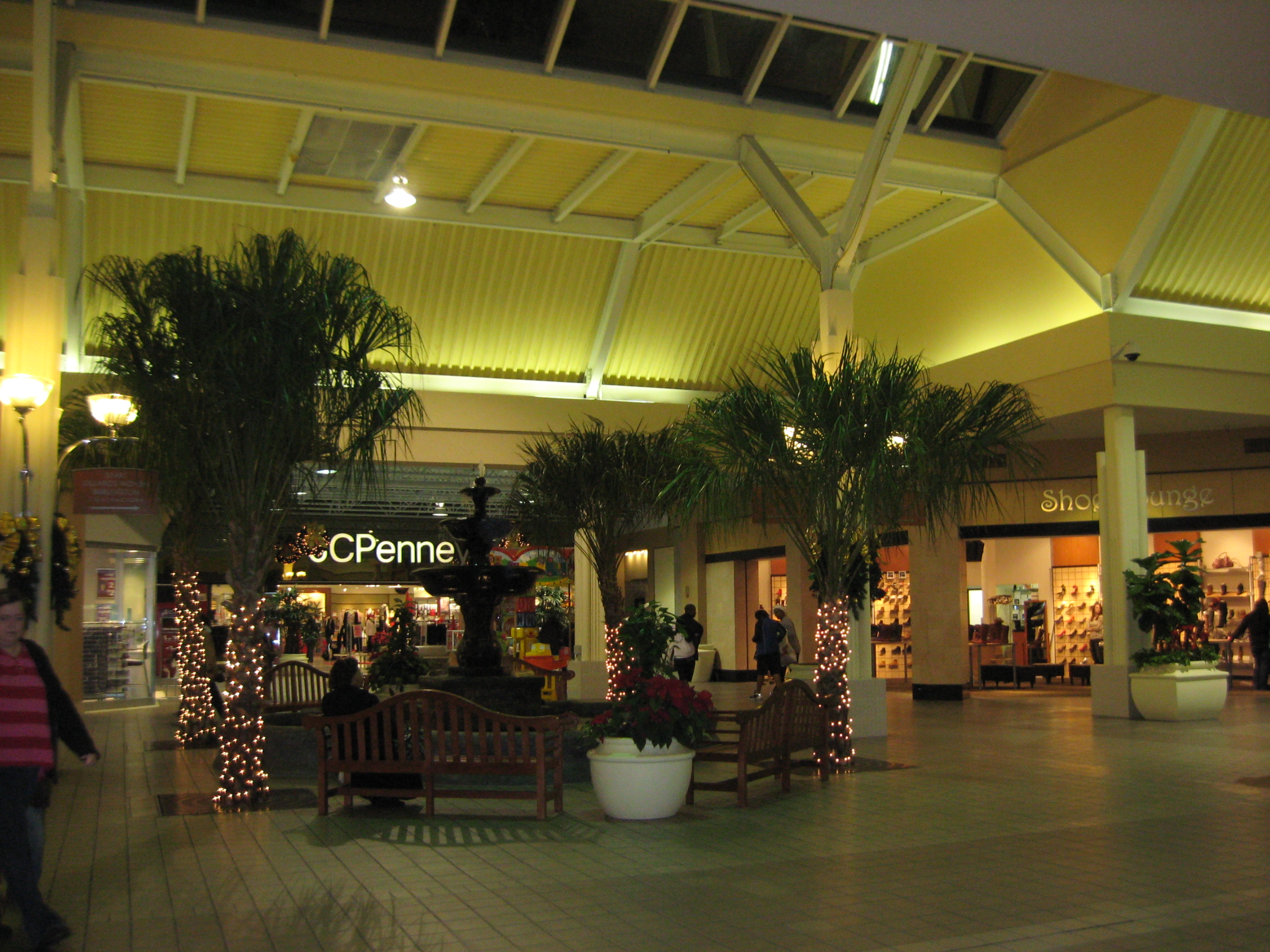
- One of the interior water fountains, 2009
- Location: Slidell, Louisiana, United States
- Coordinates: 30.30747°N 89.82315°W
- Opened: 1985
- Closed: July 2019
- Developer: Homart Development Company
- Owner: Morguard
- Num. of stores: 6 (before closure)
- Num. of anchor tenants: 5 (3 open, 2 vacant)
- Floor area: 621,192 sq ft (57,710.6 m^{2})
- Floors: 1
- Website: web.archive.org/*/http://northshoresquareonline.com/

North Shore Square was a 621,192-square-foot (57,710.6 m^{2}) shopping mall located in Slidell, Louisiana, United States. It was the largest mall on the north shore of Lake Pontchartrain, the 5th largest mall in the New Orleans area, and the 11th largest mall in Louisiana.

== History ==
The mall was home to three anchor stores: two Dillard's locations (One was originally a D. H. Holmes, and the second was originally a Maison Blanche, which opened in 1990.) At Home and Conn’s were with six other stores in the interior shortly before its closure. All three anchor stores are on one level. The mall did not flood during Hurricane Katrina and experienced no serious damage. The mall formerly had Mervyn's as an anchor store, but closed shortly after the storm when Mervyn's pulled out of the Louisiana market. The store was eventually replaced by Burlington Coat Factory, which closed due to corporate downsizing, and was later replaced by Conn’s. Sears closed in June 2014 and was replaced by At Home. JCPenney closed on July 31, 2017.

The mall struggled partially due to increased internet-based sales as well as an open-air shopping center located on the opposite side of town, to which it lost some of its tenants.

North Shore Square came under new ownership in November 2006, after Toronto, Ontario, Canada based Revenue Properties Company Limited (a division of Morguard Corporation) purchased the mall's New Orleans–based owner, Sizeler Property Investors. There was an arcade called Pocket Change and also a food court in the mall with as many as 10 different places to eat at its peak that consisted of Chick-fil-A, Dante’s Pizza, Mandarin Express, Mrs. Fields Cookies, Arby’s, Subway, Auntie Anne's, Corn Dog 7, a NOLA wings franchise, and a Fiesta Mexican cafe, all of which have since closed.

In early April 2019, it was announced by Morguard that the mall’s interior would be closed, which has occurred as of July the same year, with the company planning to convert the mall into an open-air shopping center at some point. This leaves At Home, Conn’s, and Dillard’s (now operating as a Clearance Center) as the only remaining open stores on the property. Extra Space Storage has since opened in one of the former Dillard's locations.

In 2022, the mall was used for a car chase scene in Peacock's live action comedy post-apocalyptic series Twisted Metal. Based on the videogame series of the same name. The mall was renamed RidgePointe Centre which was a mall featured in the map Suburbs in Twisted Metal: Black on PlayStation 2.

In 2024, Conns Home Plus closed its doors due to bankruptcy.
