= Woodward's Building =

Historic commercial building in Vancouver, British Columbia, Canada

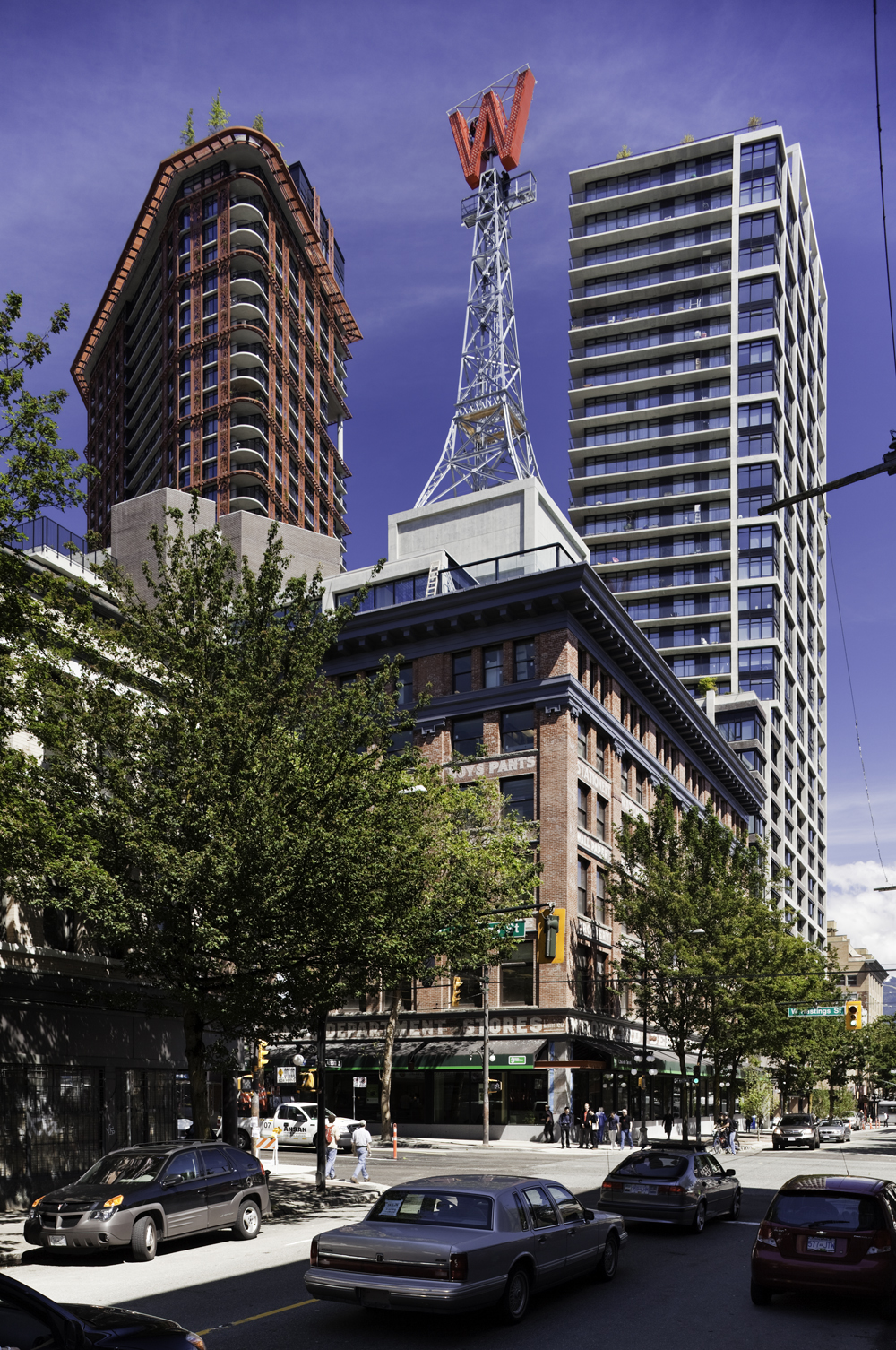
- Woodward's Building
- Interactive map of the Woodward's Building area
- Alternative names: W Building

General information
- Type: Mixed-use
- Architectural style: Postmodern/Structural Expressionism
- Location: 128 West Cordova Street; Vancouver, British Columbia
- Coordinates: 49°16′56.2″N 123°6′26.5″W
- Opened: 1903; 123 years ago
- Demolished: 30 September 2006; 19 years ago

Technical details
- Floor count: 12
- Floor area: 113,549 m^{2} (1,222,230 sq ft) (pre-2006)

The Woodward's Building is a historic building in the Downtown Eastside of Vancouver, British Columbia, Canada. The original portion of the building was constructed in 1903 for the Woodward's Department Store when that area of Cordova Street was the heart of Vancouver's retail shopping district. At one time, this was the premier shopping destination in Vancouver. The store was famous for its Christmas window displays, and its basement Food Floor and the "W" sign at the top of the building was distinctive landmark on the Vancouver skyline.

Since the bankruptcy of Woodward's in 1993, the building remained vacant except for a housing occupation in 2002 that initiated the redevelopment process. The redevelopment was seen by many as a key to revitalizing the Downtown Eastside. Still, the demolition of the structure in 2006 and redevelopment of the site have been met with much local resistance from the neighbourhood's existing residents. Woodward's redevelopment is complete, with many residents and businesses in the buildings.

== History ==
=== Early history ===
The building was built in 1903 by Charles A. Woodward as the second location for the Woodward's department store. Woodward's pioneered the concept of one-stop-shopping; the store included a food floor at the time North America's most prominent supermarket, household items, and men's and women's fashion. In addition, it provided cheque cashing, travel booking and other services. The store was well known for carrying many goods not available anywhere else. The store soon became a feature attraction in Vancouver, expanding over 12 separate phases to a final size of 12 storeys. It occupied approximately 2/3 of the city block. The popularity of Woodward's attracted many other businesses to the area.

The building grew over many years in incremental phases, so the structure varied in each building stage. Concrete slabs supported most of the building and columns, with only the original 1903–08 building using massive heavy timber construction from the old growth forests available near Vancouver at the turn of the 20th century. Much of the square footage of the building was not retail space; mazes of stockrooms and offices comprised much of the building's area, outside the view of customers.

In 1944, the landmark "W" was installed on the top of the building on a 25-metre replica of the Eiffel Tower, replacing a pre-war searchlight beacon which had until then been the building's hallmark. The beacon, which was visible at night from as far away as Abbotsford and Mission, was shut down at the beginning of World War II because of its potential use as a landmark for aerial attacks.

=== Decline ===
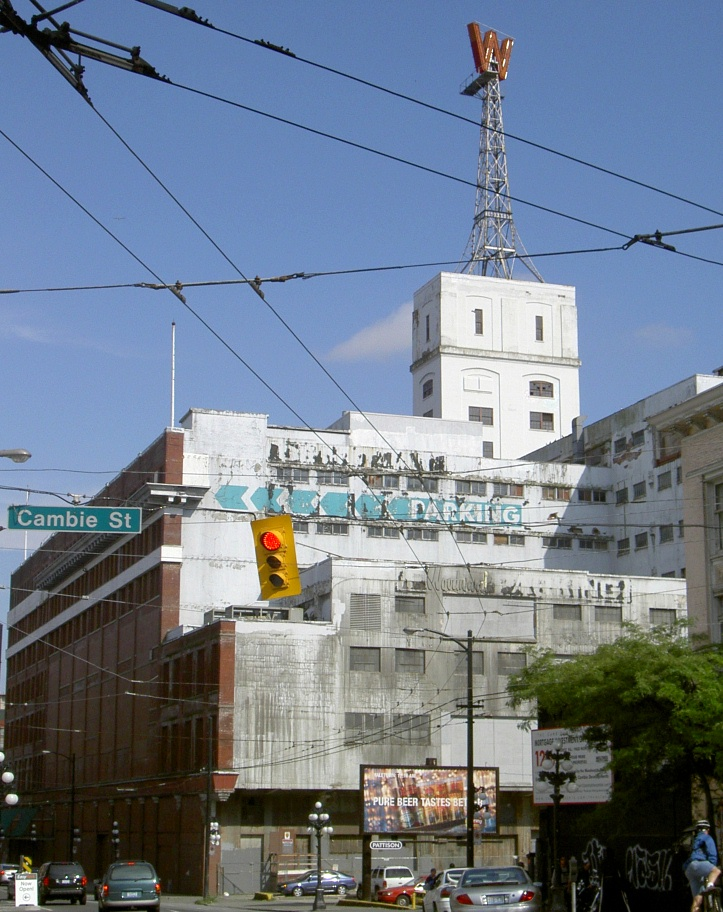
Woodward's Building, 2005

Woodward's fortunes declined as customers gravitated toward suburban shopping malls during the 1960s. The relocation of the Eaton's department store from West Hastings and Richards (a few blocks away), to the uptown location of Pacific Centre in the 1960s signalled the demise of West Hastings Street as the central retail district of the city. This was further exasperated by the deindustrialization of the old city centre, which led to the migration of working-class residents out of the area and the loss of an essential source of clients. Immediately the following deindustrialization was the expansion of the quaternary sector of the post-industrial economy over at the West End, shifting major economic activities to the new city centre near Burrard and Georgia streets, further reducing Woodward's prominence.

In the 1980s, Woodward's sold the food floor – long known for its quality and its line of unusual specialties – to Safeway. The flagship food floor became an IGA store until the building closed, as Safeway showed no interest in that location. During the same time, the area around Woodward's building started to decline socially and economically.

In 1993, Woodward's went bankrupt and closed its doors. Many of the store's suburban locations were sold to the Hudson's Bay Company for conversion to Zellers and Bay stores. Still, there was little interest in the historic downtown building. The closing of Woodward's store precipitated an even more rapid decline in the area.

== Redevelopment ==
=== Early proposals ===
In 1995 the building was acquired by Fama Holdings. By using the services of Brook Development Planning, Davidson Yuen Simpson and Foad Rafii Architects developed a plan to build private housing in the building. However, many of those in the neighbourhood strongly objected, as they felt it important that the project incorporate social housing. The provincial government of British Columbia decided to fund some social housing as part of the project, but Fama and the province could not agree, and the project died. The building stood largely vacant, except for the occasional film shoot. In 2001 the province bought the building from Fama for $22 million. Various options were pursued to develop the building, but in early 2002 the new Provincial government put the project on hold.

In the fall of 2002, a small group of community activists squatted the empty building for one week in a campaign to secure social housing from the Provincial government. After the police eviction, a tent city was erected on the sidewalks around the building for another three months. The series of events is known as the Woodward's Squat, or "Woodsquat," which has been acknowledged for "setting in motion the eventual redevelopment of the landmark department store building."

=== Community-led redevelopment ===
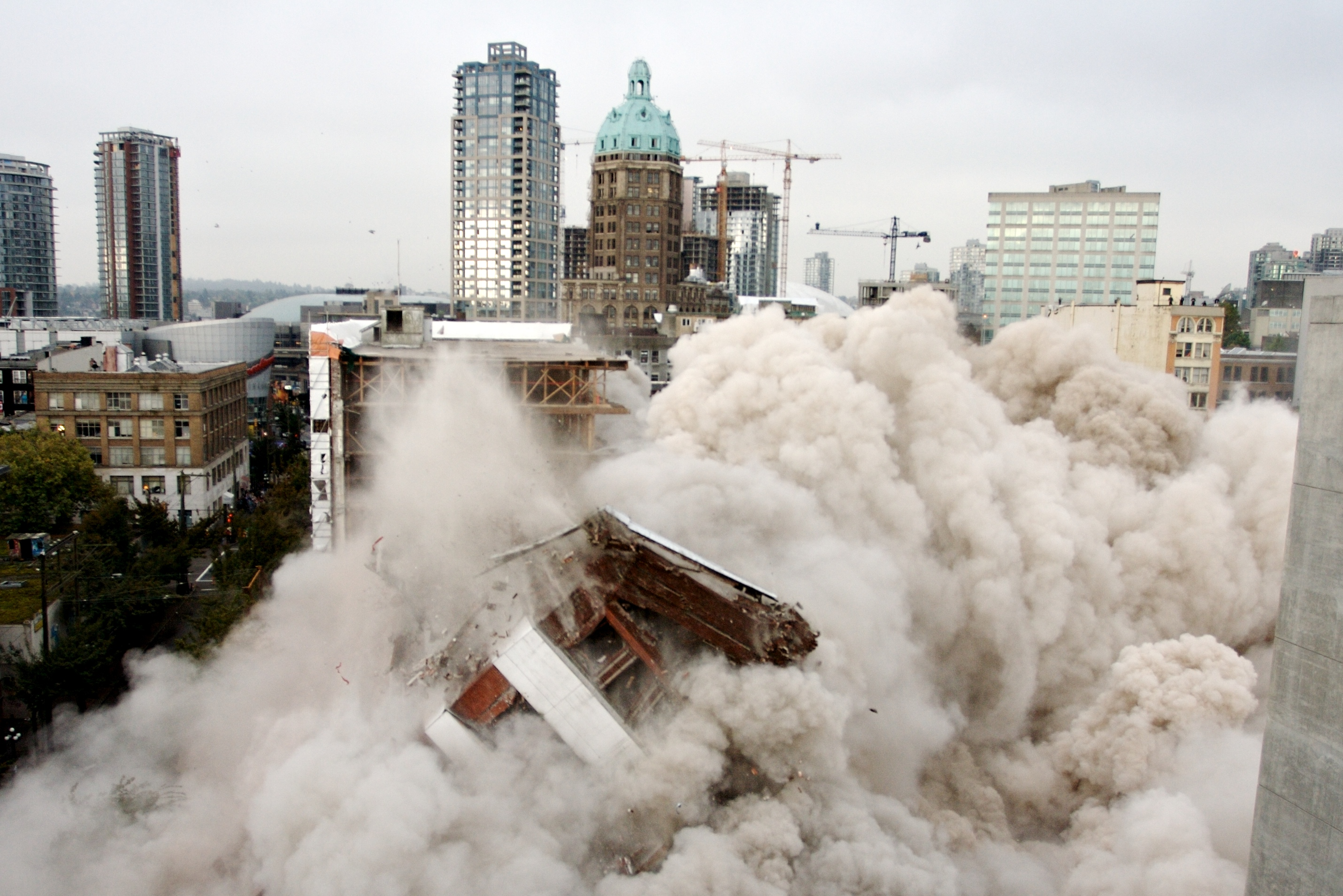
Demolition of the Woodward's Building on 30 September 2006. The original 1903 section can be seen standing behind the cloud at Abbott and Hastings Streets.

In 2003, the City of Vancouver, led by City Council member Jim Green, purchased the building from the province for $5 million and began a public consultation process, asking the community what they wanted from the redevelopment. After a two-stage competition between three developers in September 2004, the city selected Westbank Projects/Peterson Investment Group to develop the project with the architecture firm of Henriquez Partners led by Gregory Henriquez. The 400 million dollars, nearly one million square foot project includes 536 market housing units, 125 singles non-market housing units to be operated by PHS Community Services, 75 family non-market housing units to be handled by Affordable Housing Society, Nesters Market, London Drugs, TD Canada Trust, the National Film Board of Canada and civic offices, a daycare, public atrium and plaza, and a new 130,000 square foot addition to Simon Fraser University's downtown campus, the SFU School for Contemporary Arts.

On the morning of 30 September 2006, all but the oldest original portion (1903–08 building) of the Woodward's structure was demolished with a "roll-over" implosion by Pacific Blasting, which signalled the beginning of the construction of the new complex of buildings.

=== Results ===
The development permit for construction was issued on January 26, 2007, and while substantial completion was scheduled for June 2010, delays pushed that completion date back to September 2010.

The "W" neon sign, which topped the building on the Eiffel Tower replica, was removed before the demolition and was replicated and re-installed on January 9, 2010, now with LED lights. The original W is now displayed in the open area next to The Charles Bar at the new Woodward's Building. In 2008 the Vancouver artist Stan Douglas completed a 30' by 50' image on glass depicting the Gastown Riots of 1971. Together with a basketball hoop, the oversized photograph has become the central focus within the atrium of the new Woodward's Redevelopment.

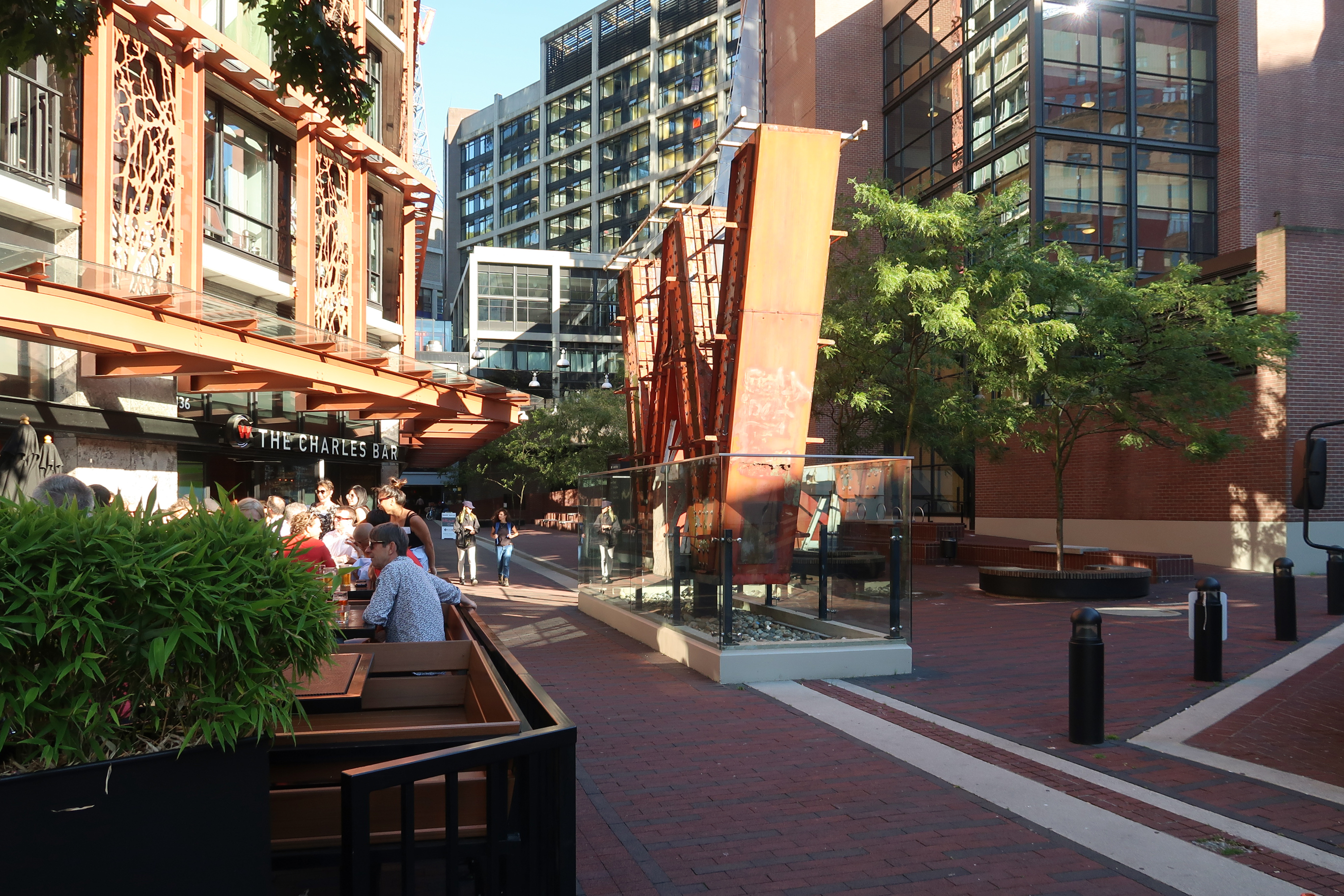
Outdoor plaza, 2018

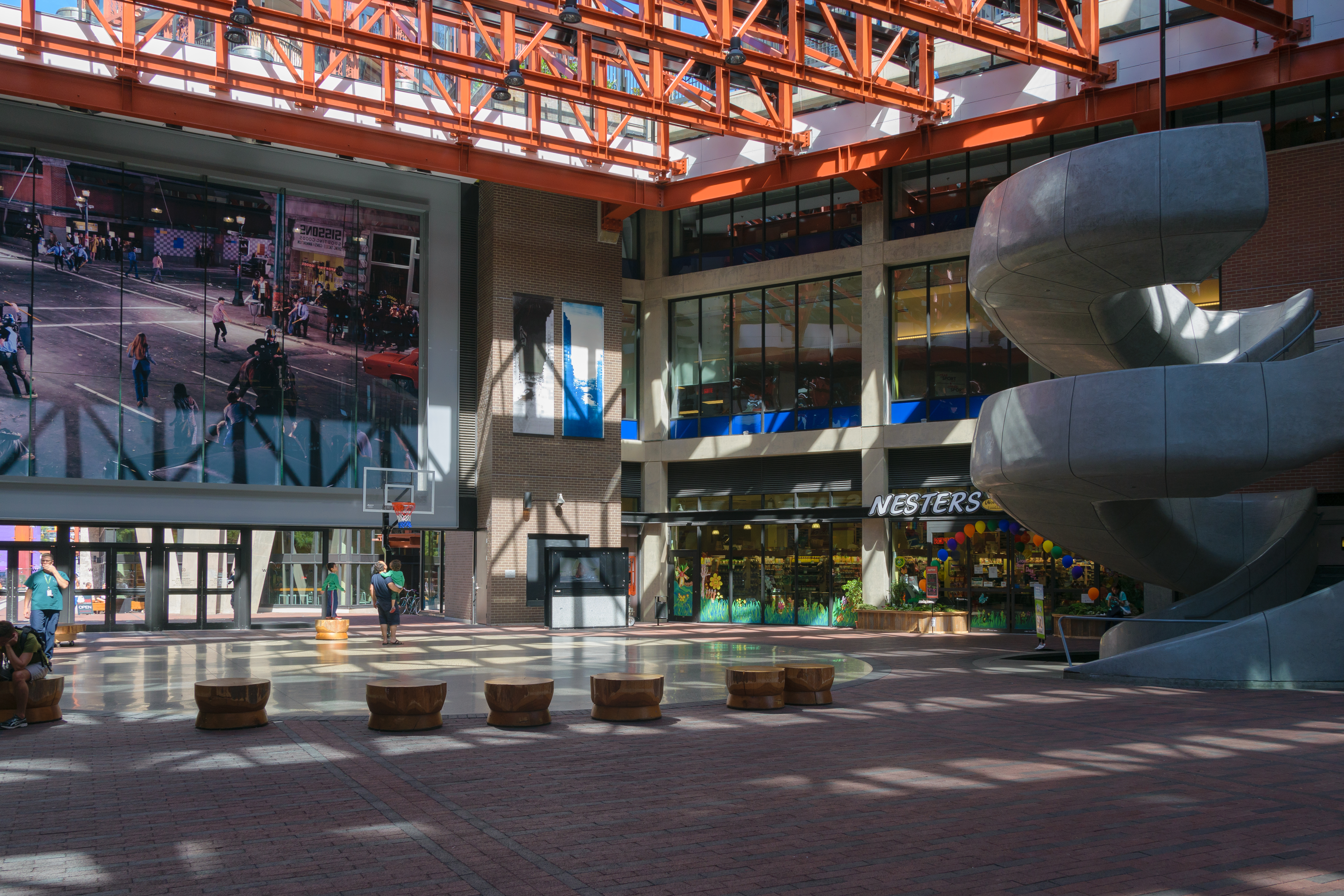
Indoor plaza, 2015

== See also ==
- Downtown Eastside
- Gregory Henriquez
- List of heritage buildings in Vancouver
- Woodward's 43
