= Southland Mall (Bayou Cane, Louisiana) =

Shopping mall in Bayou Cane, Louisiana, U.S.

Coordinates: 29.6350437°N 90.7562275°W

- Opened: 1969
- Manager: Morguard
- Num. of stores: 75
- Num. of anchor tenants: 3 (2 open, 1 vacant)
- Floor area: 600,000 sq ft (56,000 m^{2})
- Floors: 1 (3 in Dillard's)
- Website: southlandmallonline.com

Southland Mall is an enclosed shopping mall located in Bayou Cane, Louisiana, United States, at the intersection of Bayou Gardens Boulevard and West Park Avenue. It has a Houma postal address.

It was remodeled in 2006. The mall had required a curfew in 1996 because of teens fighting. In 1998, the mall added a Santa fixture. The movie theater closed in 2007. Scooters were used for security in 2010. During the summer of 2016, the Sears, which opened in 1966, closed after poor sales, as well as other Sears stores across the U.S. Anchor stores are Dillard's and JCPenney.
