= Spring (building) =

Luxury high-rise condominium in Austin Texas

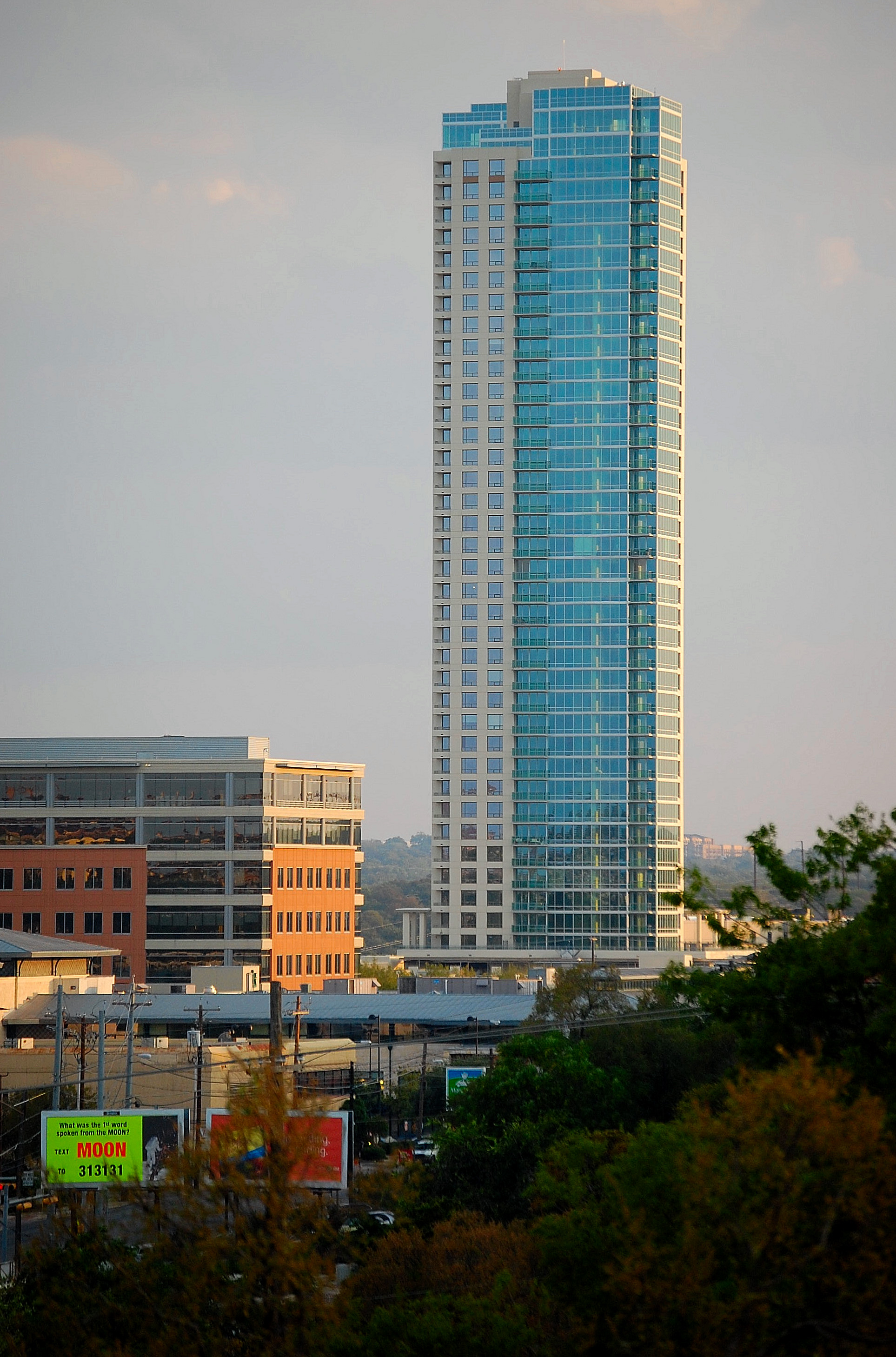
- Spring in September 2009
- Interactive map of the Spring area

General information
- Status: Completed
- Type: Residential
- Location: 300 Bowie Street; Austin, Texas
- Coordinates: 30.2688516°N 97.7538200°W
- Construction started: 2007
- Completed: 2009
- Opening: 2009
- Cost: US$60 million

Height
- Tip: 132 m (433 ft)
- Roof: 132 m (433 ft)
- Top floor: 120 m (394 ft)

Technical details
- Floor count: 43

Design and construction
- Architects: Design Architect: Rafii Architects; Architects of record: Morris Architects
- Developer: Zenith Partners Ltd

Spring is a 43-story, 132 m (433 ft) tall condominium in Austin, Texas. Upon its completion in 2009 it became the 3rd tallest building in Austin and the tallest building in the West End. The tower currently stands as the 14th tallest in the city. It was designed by Vancouver–based architect Foad Rafii. The architect of record was Morris Architects and Pentagram was the graphic designer of the project. Spring was the first point tower in Austin, a term referring to a slender tower above a large, mid-rise base.

Spring is known for its prominence in the West End skyline, being the furthest west skyscraper in Austin. The tower was also the first building in Austin to feature an in-slab HVAC exhaust system, in which the exhaust air from the building is carried through horizontal ductwork cast into the floor plates and the building's perimeter, rather than being exhausted vertically to the roof. The tower's main structure is made of cast in place concrete. Austin Energy has given Spring a green rating.

== Facilities ==
The skyscraper features a handful of amenities, many of which are located on the 5th floor deck. This includes a pool, spa, and grills. The building's design combines a concrete parking base with a large glass atrium lining the tower with windows and balconies, anchoring the west side of the Austin skyline.

== See also ==
- List of tallest buildings in Austin
