= Temple Hotels =

Canadian real estate corporation

Temple Hotels Inc.
- Company type: Public
- Traded as: TSX: TPH
- Industry: Real Estate
- Predecessor: Temple Real Estate Investment Trust
- Founded: 2006
- Headquarters: 2600 Seven Evergreen Pl, Winnipeg, Canada
- Services: Hotel property ownership and management
- Parent: Morguard Corporation
- Website: www.templehotels.ca

Temple Hotels Inc. is a Canadian real-estate company that owns and manages hotels across Canada. By 2020, the company owned 28 hotels, nine of which were located in Fort McMurray, Alberta, and three in Saskatchewan, formerly including the Temple Gardens Hotel & Spa (its namesake).

Originally established as an income trust under the name Temple Real Estate Investment Trust, the company converted to a corporation under the name Temple Hotels Inc., effective December 31, 2012. Formerly listed on the Toronto Stock Exchange under the symbol TPH, Temple was purchased by Morguard Corporation in February 2020 to become a subsidiary of Morguard.

== Properties ==
In 2012, Temple REIT owned the following properties:

- Alberta
  - Best Western Wayside Inn & Suites — Lloydminster
  - Clearwater Suite Hotel — Fort McMurray
  - Clearwater Residence Hotel - Timberlea — Fort McMurray
  - Franklin Suite Hotel — Fort McMurray
  - Holiday Inn Express — Sherwood Park
  - Hilton Garden Inn - West Edmonton — Edmonton
  - Merit Hotel & Suites — Fort McMurray
  - Nomad Hotel & Suites — Fort McMurray
  - Radisson Hotel & Suites — Fort McMurray
  - Sheraton Red Deer — Red Deer
  - Vantage Inn and Suites — Fort McMurray
- British Columbia
  - Inn at the Quay — New Westminster
- Manitoba
  - Holiday Inn South — Winnipeg (50%)
- Northwest Territories
  - Chateau Nova and Chateau Nova Suites — Yellowknife
- Nova Scotia
  - Cambridge Suites — Halifax
  - Prince George Hotel — Halifax
  - Cambridge Suites — Sydney
- Ontario
  - Courtyard by Marriott — Ottawa
  - Holiday Inn Express Hotel & Suites Ottawa West — Nepean
  - Residence Inn by Marriott — London
- Saskatchewan
  - Saskatoon Inn & Conference Centre — Saskatoon
  - Wingate By Wyndham — Regina
