= Brandon Shoppers Mall =

Shoppers Mall
- Location: 1570 18th Street; Brandon, Manitoba
- Coordinates: 49.825042°N 99.963726°W
- Management: Morguard
- Owner: Morguard
- Stores and services: 90+
- Anchor tenants: 5
- Floor area: 367,000 square feet (34,100 m^{2})
- Floors: 2
- Website: shoppersmallbrandon.com

Shoppers Mall is the largest enclosed shopping center in Brandon, Manitoba. It offers over 90 stores and services including a movie theatre and food court. The anchor tenants of the mall are Sport Chek, Landmark Cinemas, Sobeys Extra, GoodLife Fitness, Shoppers Drug Mart, and Dollarama. Walmart anchored the mall on the east side until 2006. It was replaced by Zellers, and Zellers was replaced by Target in 2013.
