= Jean Edmonds =

Canadian journalist and public servant

Jean Edmonds (January 7, 1921 – January 31, 1994) was a Canadian journalist and public servant who became one of the first women to be appointed to senior executive roles in Canada's federal public service.

== Early life and career ==
Born Jean King in Winnipeg on January 7, 1921, and educated in Winnipeg schools, Edmonds graduated from the University of Manitoba in 1942 with a degree in economics and English. Her father was a staunch Liberal, her mother a feminist and a Fabian socialist. Discussion of public affairs was a staple at the dinner table as she was growing up.

In 1942 she married pharmacist George Edmonds. They had two children, a daughter and a son.

For two decades she worked as a journalist, primarily for the Financial Post, but also as a broadcaster for the Canadian Broadcasting Corporation, as well as teaching courses in economics. She accomplished many firsts as a woman working in fields thought to be the preserve of men. She commenced work at the Financial Post during World War II, serving as assistant investor editor and features editor at the publication's headquarters in Toronto. Later, after returning to Winnipeg, Edmonds was contributing editor, columnist and served as the paper's first western editor. At the time the Financial Post was edited by Ronald A. McEachern (1942–64) who had a reputation as a pioneer in bringing women into financial journalism. However, McEachern, concerned about the conservative world of finance, required that her byline be J.K. Edmonds (Jean King Edmonds).

== Career as journalist and economist ==
Edmonds achieved several distinctions working as a journalist and economist during the earlier part of her career (1942-1964):

- After graduation from university, she became assistant to the director of research for the Province of Manitoba Committee on Manitoba's Post-war Economic Future.
- During the late 1950s she made regular appearances on the local CBC Winnipeg public affairs broadcast Roundtable.
- In 1958 along with one other Winnipeg journalist, she assisted Tom Kent, editor of the Winnipeg Free Press, in drafting the platform for the Liberal Party of Canada for the 1958 general election. The platform was based on resolutions adopted by the national Liberal Party convention held in January 1958 that selected Lester B. Pearson as leader.
- In 1960 she was named Woman of the Year by the Winnipeg Women's Advertising Club.
- She was the only woman to appear on the program of the Liberal Party's 1960 Kingston Ontario Thinkers Conference, an event that “later acquired semi-mythic status” to historians and commentators, because of its importance in the evolution of policy-making by the reforming Liberal governments of the sixties. Historian John English commented "the conference appears to have been a remarkable success...Others...have described the conference as a "forecast for the future". Jean Edmonds' role was as a discussant of the Conference's key economic policy paper, delivered by future cabinet minister and senator Maurice Lamontagne. She advocated an expanded federal government role in technical training, a key policy development that emerged in the years to follow.
- In September 1961 Premier Duff Roblin of Manitoba appointed a committee on Manitoba's economic future composed of the thirty-seven men and one woman, Jean Edmonds.
- During her career Edmonds was frequently invited to speak on business and economic matters.

== Public service career ==
Edmonds joined the federal public service in 1964 as regional economist for the Central Mortgage and Housing Corporation (CMHC), Prairie Region. In 1966, she joined the then newly-formed Department of Manpower and Immigration and in 1968 she was appointed Regional Director, Prairie Region, becoming one of the first female senior executives in public service ranks. In 1973, she was appointed Assistant Deputy Minister, Immigration. From 1977 to 1981 she served as Regional Director, Department of Regional Economic Expansion, based in Winnipeg. Typically, key policy and administrative decisions are held closely in Ottawa. Her appointment was one of fifteen, and was an initiative to delegate more senior responsibility outside Ottawa than before.

In 1981, Edmonds moved to the private sector, associated with Hickling-Johnston management consultants, and returned to the public service as Federal Economic Development Coordinator, Manitoba, in 1982, serving in that position until July 2, 1984, when she was appointed Associate Secretary, Ministry of State for Economic and Regional Development, a position with Deputy Minister status in the Government of Canada.

She retired from the Public Service on July 12, 1985 and on the same day was appointed Chair of Manitoba Telephone System.

== Task Force on Barriers in Public Service ==
In 1988 new responsibilities came her way with a new appointment in Ottawa. Treasury Board President Patricia Carney initiated the Task Force on Barriers to Women in the Public Service. In the introduction to the final report Carney stated it was “several supportive deputy ministers” who recommended Jean Edmonds become the chair of the Task Force. Other members were Jocelyne Côté-O’Hara and Edna Mackenzie.

The final report of the task force, titled Beneath the Veneer, was released on April 23, 1990. The report found that while women in the public service reflected their numbers found in the labour force, “they are largely confined to a few occupational groups and compressed into the lower levels of pay and status. They face barriers to movement... and advancement to the top levels...”. The report made a series of recommendations on how to change this.

After her retirement, the Canadian Centre for Management Development honoured Jean Edmonds by initiating a series of lectures in her name called “The Edmonds Lectures: Women and Work” (Lecturers included senior public servants Jocelyne Bourgon and Arthur Kroeger as well as future Supreme Court Justice Rosalie Abella).

Jean Edmonds died in Victoria, British.Columbia, on January 31, 1994.

In 2015 Jean Edmonds appeared in a video tribute to female public servants, past and present, recognizing women's contributions, on the occasion of International Women's Day.

== Jean Edmonds Towers ==
Following her death, two downtown office buildings in Ottawa located on Kent Street, originally occupied by the now-defunct newspaper the Ottawa Journal, were renamed after Edmonds and are currently occupied by the Department of Immigration and Citizenship. A biography on display in the foyer of the South Tower on Laurier states in conclusion: "Jean Edmonds, who died in 1994, changed the face of the Public Service forever."
