= Foad Rafii =

Canadian architect

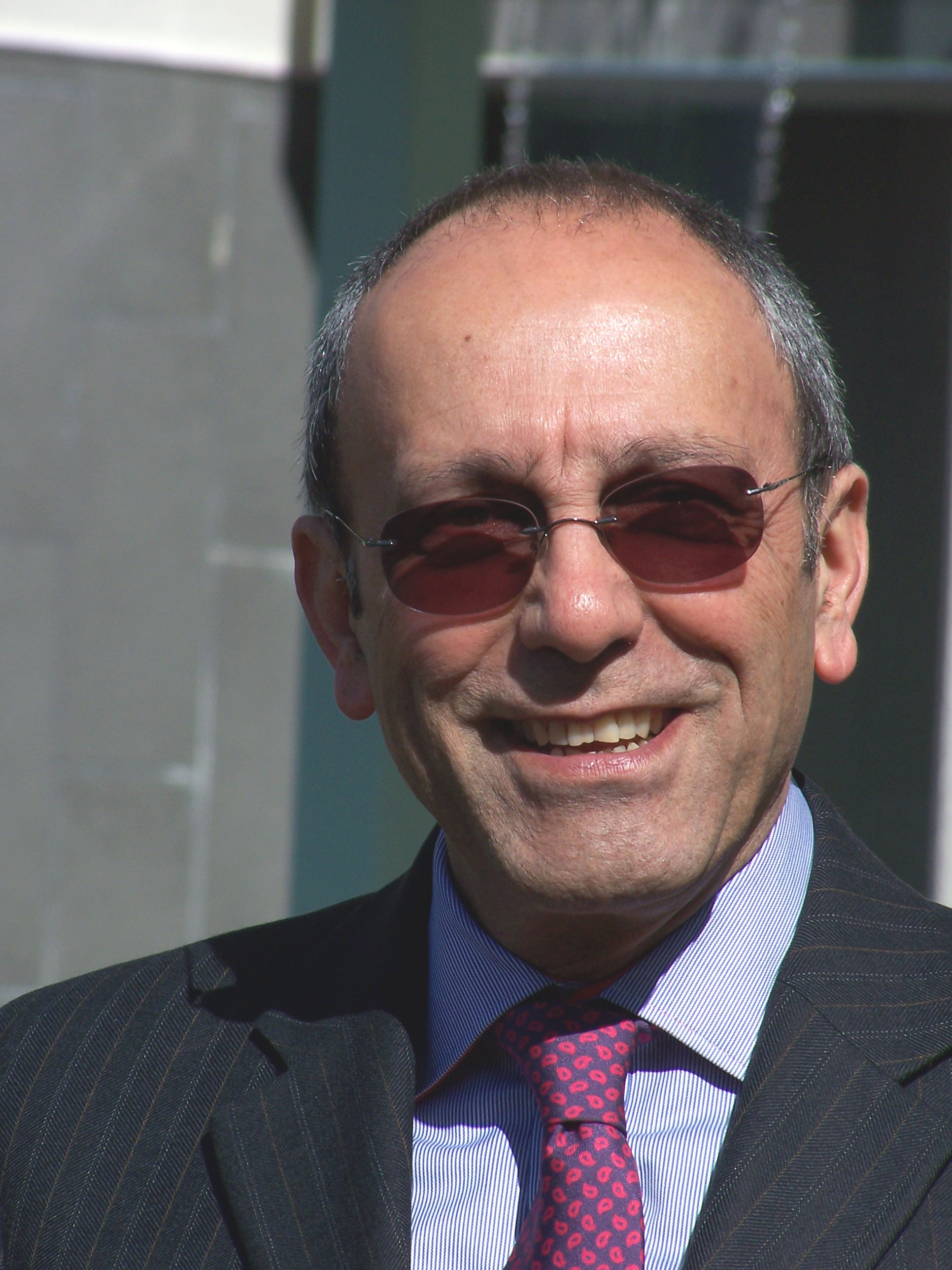
- Born: March 8, 1947 (age 79); Tehran, Iran
- Occupation: Architect
- Practice: Rafii Architects Inc.
- Projects: Scotia Theatres Complex (Paramont Place)- Vancouver; Donovan (Vancouver); Pomaria (Vancouver); Spring (Austin, Texas); Stella, Nova, Luna (Calgary); Waterfront Complex (Calgary); Domus (Vancouver); Nova (Vancouver); Longwood (Nanaimo, British Columbia); Mondrian (Vancouver)

Foad Rafii (Persian: فؤاد رفیعی) M.Arch. Architect AAA, AIBC. FRAIC (born March 8, 1947) is a Canadian architect.

In 2001, The Vancouver Sun in a headline article, named Foad Rafii as one of the 10 architects who shaped the Vancouver of today.

In early 2014 Foad Rafii was elected to Fellowship in the College of Fellows of the Royal Architectural Institute of Canada.

== Education ==
Foad is a graduate of Alborz High School (Old American College) in Tehran, who received his master's degree in architecture with Distinction from the University of Tehran, School of Architecture in 1972.

In 1976, he attended the University of Oslo, and completed a course in "Urban and Regional Planning and Environment Protection".

In 1987, he completed work on "Urban Waterfront Development" at the Harvard Graduate School of Design.

== Career ==
In 1973 together with some colleague friends he started the consulting firm ORBIS Institute for Environmental Design, Foad being the Managing Director.

While practicing in Tehran, in addition to multiple residential projects, he worked on two major department stores and a few hospitals.

Foad moved to Vancouver in 1979, and after working for an architectural firm for a couple of years, established his practice in 1983. The name of the practice was changed to Rafii Architects in 1985.

In more than a quarter century, Rafii Architects has designed numerous major projects in Vancouver, the rest of British Columbia, Alberta, and some projects abroad.

"The Greater Vancouver Book", an urban encyclopedia- The year 1997- notes: Iranian Architects like Foad Rafii, who designed the first buildings constructed on the North shore of False Creek after Expo 86 and the new mixed use Woodward's building Downtown, have made and are continuing to make a significant impact on the changing face of Vancouver. The Woodward's Building project was abandoned later, as a result of the sale of the property from the province of British Columbia to the City of Vancouver.

In fall 2009 an article published in Canadian Builders Quarterly, focused on "Vancouverism" quotes Foad Rafii as an Architect who shares a significant role in this movement.

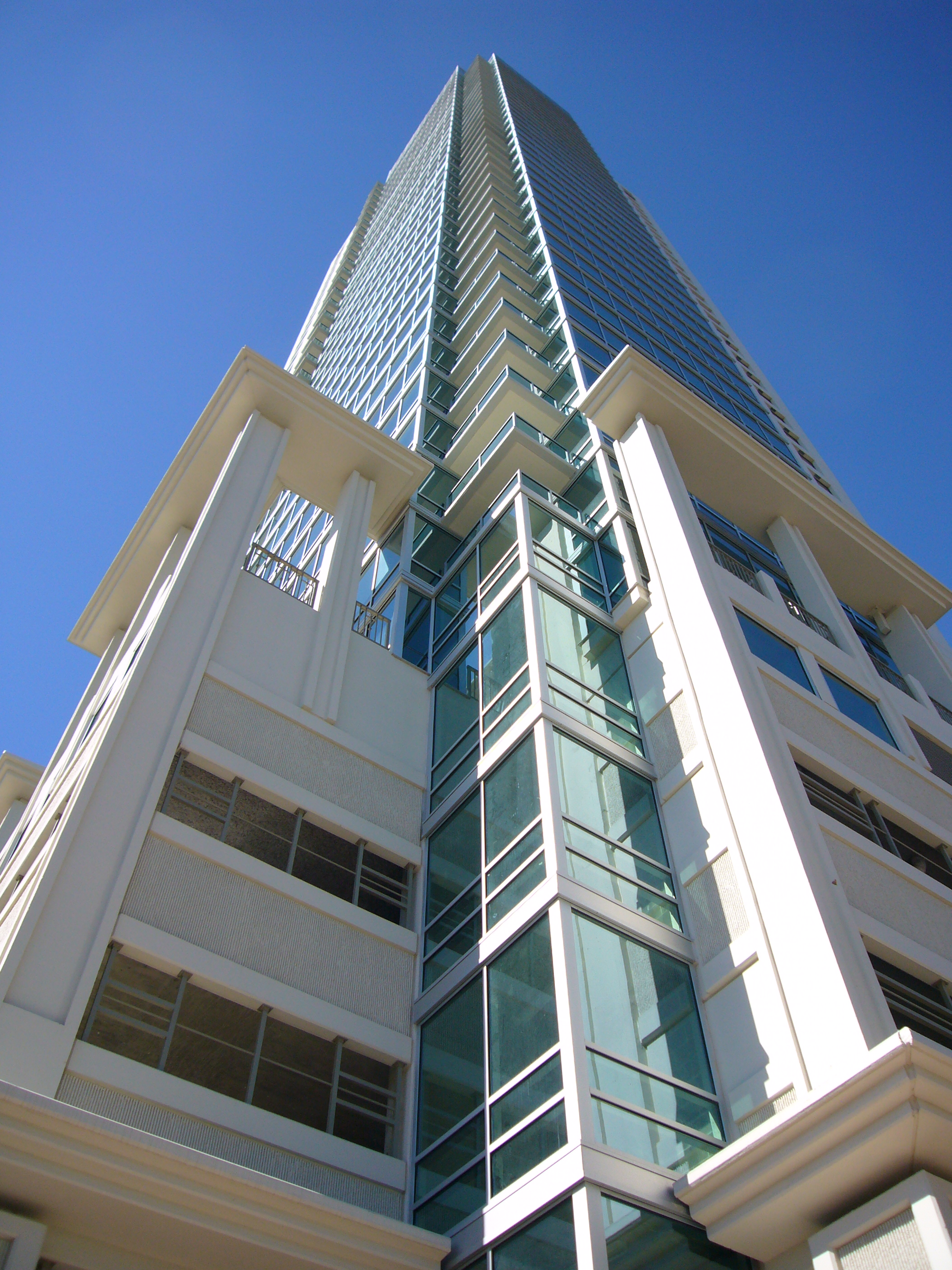
Spring Tower, Austin, Texas, United States.

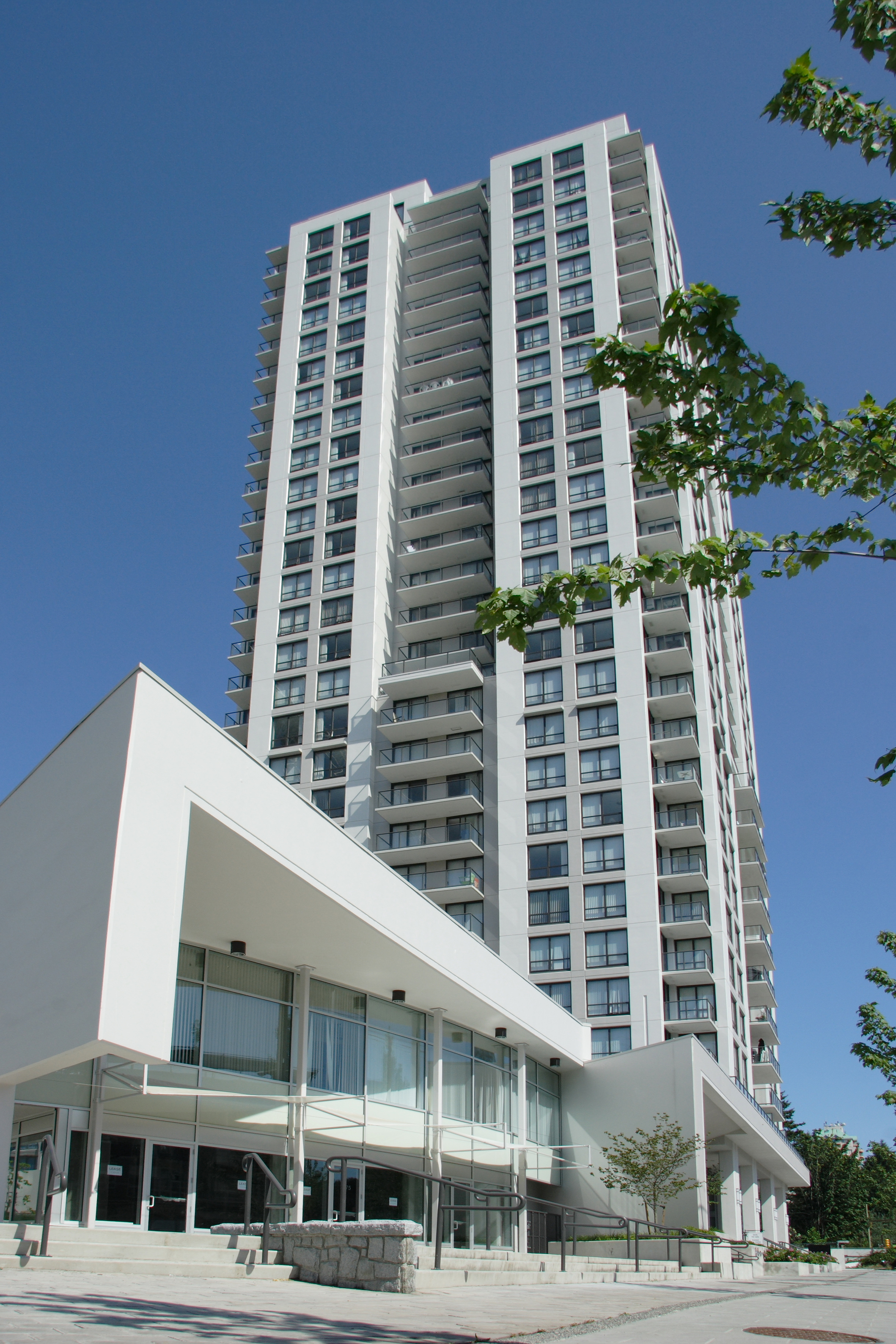
Altamonte Tower, Coquitlam, British Columbia, Canada

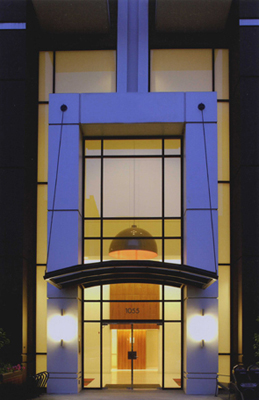
Entrance to Domus Tower, Vancouver, British Columbia, Canada

== Award winning projects ==
- Texo, Distinguished Building Award - Spring (building) Condominiums - Austin - Texas - 2010
- Georgie Award - Gold - For Best Multifamily High Rise – Donovan Residential Tower - Vancouver - 2009
- UDI Award - For Best Residential High Rise – Pomaria Tower - Vancouver - 2007
- CARE Gold Project of the Year Award - Coniston + Stonecroft Low Rise Residentials - Nanaimo – 2001
- Georgie Award - Gold - Best Multifamily Low Rise – 18 trees - Burnaby - 2000
- British Columbia Heritage Award – Camelia Residential Tower - North Vancouver - 1993

== See also ==
- The Story of Woodward's Building- City of Vancouver Website - Downtown Eastside Plan
- Spring (building) Austin's First Point Tower - Spring's official Website -
