= Bower Place =

- Location: 4900 Molly Banister Drive; Red Deer, Alberta; T4R 1N9
- Coordinates: 52°14′35″N 113°48′35″W
- Opened: 1981
- Manager: QuadReal Property Group
- Owner: QuadReal
- Num. of stores: Over 110
- Num. of anchor tenants: 9
- Floor area: 502,399 sq ft (46,674.4 m^{2})
- Floors: 2
- Website: bowerplace.com

Bower Place (also known as Bower Place Shopping Centre) is a shopping centre located in Red Deer, Alberta, Canada.

It has more than 110 stores and services including H&M, and Shoppers Drug Mart. The mall underwent a $55 million redevelopment that commenced in September 2004 and was completed in August 2009.

The mall underwent another renovation of a former Target Canada location following the company's bankruptcy and vacating (it had previously been a Zeller's location). The renovated and expanded wing opened in December 2019, with Marshalls, Shoppers Drug Mart, and Sunterra Market as anchor tenants. The mall had a major anchor vacancy in the former Sears Canada location, which closed in 2018 until Motion Fitness took over the vacant space in 2022 and Ardene in 2023.

== Anchors ==
- Ardene
- Dollarama
- H&M
- Marshalls
- Motion Fitness
- Shoppers Drug Mart
- Sunterra Market

== Former Anchors ==
- Hudson's Bay
- Target
- Zellers
- Toys R Us
- Woodward's
