= Kitchen Stuff Plus =

Canadian retailer in housewares and home decor

- Company type: Private company
- Industry: Retail
- Founded: 1987; 39 years ago
- Founder: Mark Halpern
- Headquarters: Toronto, Canada
- Number of locations: 25
- Area served: Greater Toronto Area
- Products: housewares and home decor
- Website: kitchenstuffplus.com

Kitchen Stuff Plus is a Canadian retailer in housewares and home decor. The company operates 25 stores in the Greater Toronto Area, London, Innisfil, Hamilton, and St. Catharines

== History ==
In 1987, CEO Mark Halpern started Kitchen Stuff Plus as a booth at the Pickering flea market to pay for university. With the large success of the booth, in 1993 he opened a pop-up store at Yonge and Bloor in Toronto, becoming the company's first full-time store. Mark Halpern died in September 2022.

The fast growing company launched their first website in 2000 and was well on their way to opening their fourth and fifth stores. In 2003, they were awarded the Global Innovator Award for Canada by the International Housewares Association. By 2009, Kitchen Stuff Plus had 11 stores across the Greater Toronto Area. In 2010, Kitchen Stuff Plus started their now famous Warehouse Sale in North York. Kitchen Stuff Plus has joined the Retail Council of Canada and has been a part of the Fairfax company since 2013.

== Awards ==
Excellence in Retail Marketing Award for our Back To School campaign in 2017.
