= Woodward's =

Department store chain in western Canada

Woodward's Stores Ltd.
- Type: Department store chain
- Industry: Retail
- Founded: 1892; 134 years ago
- Founder: Charles A. Woodward
- Defunct: 1993
- Fate: Filed for bankruptcy, stores sold to the Hudson's Bay Company
- Successor: Hudson's Bay Company
- Headquarters: Vancouver, British Columbia
- Products: (Full-line department stores & supermarkets) Clothing, grocery, pharmacy, footwear, bedding, hardware, furniture, appliances, electronics, music, cosmetics, jewellery, china, imported specialities, housewares, sporting goods, stationery, toys, home textiles, restaurants, garden centre, auto centres (at most locations); services at stores also included: travel agency, book stores, optical, hair salon, shoe repair.

Woodward's Stores Ltd. was a department store chain that operated in Alberta and British Columbia, Canada, for 101 years, before its sale to the Hudson's Bay Company.

== Early history ==
Charles Woodward established the first Woodward store at the corner of Main and Georgia Streets in Vancouver in 1892. On September 12, 1902, Woodward Department Stores Ltd. was incorporated, and a new store was built on the corner of Hastings and Abbott Streets.

In 1926, a store was opened in Edmonton and by the late 1940s the company operated numerous stores in British Columbia and Alberta. Stores opened included Victoria in 1945, Port Alberni in 1948, Park Royal Shopping Centre in West Vancouver in 1950, New Westminster in 1954, Westmount Shopper's Park in Edmonton in 1955, Oakridge Centre (where Woodward's was the owner and anchor tenant) in 1959, Chinook Centre in Calgary in 1960, Victoria in 1963, Northgate Centre in Edmonton in 1963, and Parkwood Mall Prince George and Guildford Town Centre in Surrey in 1966, Southgate Centre in Edmonton in 1970, Mayfair Shopping Centre in Victoria in 1974, Cherry Lane in Penticton in 1975, Sevenoaks Shopping Centre in Abbotsford in 1975, Lansdowne Park in Richmond in 1977, Coquitlam Centre in 1979, and Woodgrove Centre in Nanaimo in 1981.

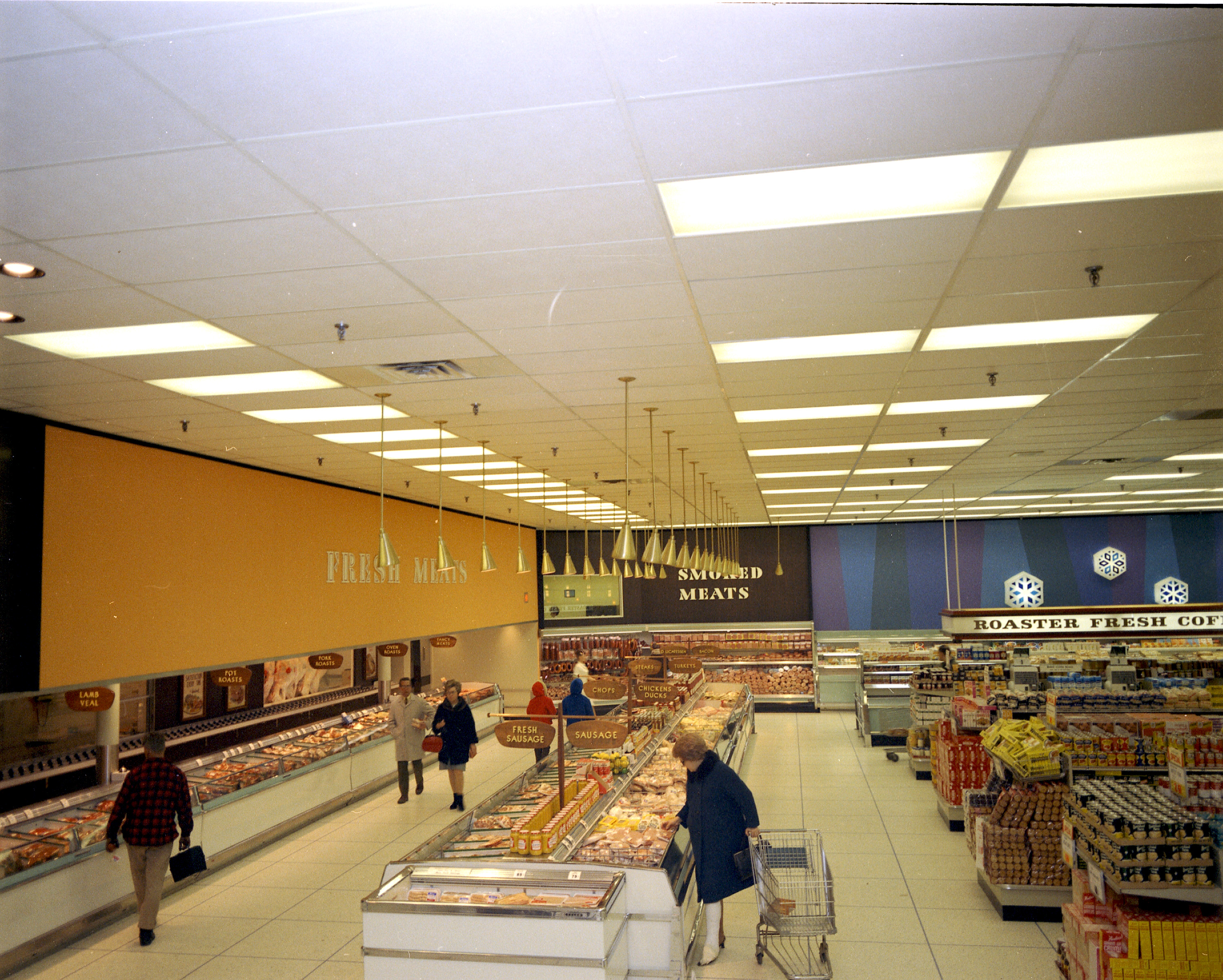
Woodward's food floor at Northgate Centre, 1970

Woodward's was a central feature of the retail scene in southwestern British Columbia for much of the twentieth century. The chain was distinctive in that stores included a large supermarket known as the "Food Floor". At Oakridge Centre and Chinook Centre (Calgary), the Woodward's Food Floor had a conveyor system from the cash registers out to a structure in the parking lot. Upon request, the bag boys would pack customers' groceries into numbered bins and send the bins through the conveyor system. Then customers would take tags with matching numbers out to the structure, and more bag boys would load the groceries from the matching bins into the customers' cars. This service was called the Grocery Parcel Depot in Oakridge and Parcel Pickup in Chinook. When Woodward's sold the Food Floor chain - long known for its quality and its line of unusual specialities - to Safeway, the flagship store's food floor became a reduced-size IGA supermarket, as Safeway showed no interest in that location.

Many western Canadians fondly remember Woodward's famous "$1.49 Day" sales (said aloud as "dollar forty-nine day"), held on the first Tuesday of every month. These sales were advertised widely on radio and in newspapers, including a distinctive jingle used for years after it was introduced in April 1958, and offered everything from canvas-top running shoes to bath oil for the one price.

Woodward's also operated two standalone Furniture Fair stores in Burnaby (which became Costco's first location in Canada in 1985) and Edmonton in the 1970s. There were also discount type stores called Woodwynn (similar to Winners) in BC and Alberta (some within Woodward's Stores), which were originally known as Woodward's Bargain Stores. Several malls also had separate Woodward's Book Stores.

== Bankruptcy, collapse and aftermath ==
In 1985, Woodward's sold its real estate to Cambridge Shopping Centres Limited which many analysts see as the beginning of the end, all while the company's financial condition continued to deteriorate throughout the remaining of the 1980s. Woodward's filed for bankruptcy protection on December 11, 1992, after a decade of failing to keep up with the changing retail landscape. By March 1993, it was apparent that the company's days were numbered as the Hudson's Bay Company came up with a merger proposal far more interesting than Woodward's own restructuring plan.

On May 21, 1993, Hudson's Bay Company acquired 21 of the total 25 Woodward's locations in a $235 millions takeover. The first Woodward's stores closed in late June 1993 and were essentially the locations becoming Zellers. By the end of July 1993, the Woodward's stores changing to The Bay or not getting converted had also been liquidated. On August 11, 1993, 13 former Woodward's locations instantly inaugurated as The Bay stores with renovations still ongoing in all of them, while the other 10 remained closed during their transformation as Zellers scheduled to open later in mid-September. Two Woodward's locations, at Oakridge Centre and Chinook Centre, were split between The Bay and Zellers.

Four Woodward's locations were not acquired by Hudson's Bay Company and closed for good at Southgate Centre, Mill Woods Town Centre, Northgate Centre and Coquitlam Centre. The Woodward's at West Edmonton Mall was initially also among the stores that were to permanently close, but it was decided afterwards that it would reopen as The Bay. Edmonton was by far the place the most negatively impacted by the merger, with all but one of the Woodward's permanent closures happening within its city limits. In reality, a few of the locations that Hudson's Bay Company had acquired, such as in Park Royal , Bower Place and Sunridge Mall, were used to move existing The Bay or Zellers stores into the Woodward's spaces, resulting in layoffs at those places as well. An average 80% of the former Woodward's employees were hired in the case of the 13 new The Bay locations.

In a number of malls, the presence of separate operations such as the bookstore and Woodwynn required these stores to also be replaced. When the West Edmonton Mall location closed, The Bay - which already had a full store at the opposite end of the mall - simply converted the former Woodward's into a second Bay (one of the few cases where a single mall has had two duplicate anchor tenants); after a few years of this, however, the Woodward's-Bay was closed and converted into a multi-screen movie theatre, an HMV (now Sunrise Records) location, and additional retail space.

On December 8, 2009, the Woodward's Food Floor reopened for the first time since the chain's sale to Safeway. The new Woodward's Food Floor, which is located in Vancouver at the former Woodward's complex (along with a new location of London Drugs), is now a division of Nester's Market.

However, by the 2010s, HBC closed a majority of Zellers stores that were once Woodward's and resold them to Target Canada, which would then eventually file for bankruptcy in 2015. In the 2020s, multiple Hudson's Bay stores (including the short-lived Zellers pop up stores), would permanently close as its parent company filed for bankruptcy protection in 2025 with its intellectual property sold to Canadian Tire and HBC would dissolve shortly after.

== See also ==
- Woodward's Building
- List of Canadian department stores
- Spencer's (department store)
