= Deerfoot (disambiguation) =

Deerfoot can refer to:

== People ==
- Deerfoot (Seneca, ca. 1828–1896), long-distance runner from New York
- Deerfoot, Ellison Brown (Narragansett, 1913–1975), Olympian runner from Rhode Island
- Deerfoot-Bad Meat (Siksika, 1864–1897), endurance runner from Alberta

== Places ==
- Deerfoot Trail, a freeway in Calgary, Alberta, Canada named for Deerfoot-Bad Meat
- Deerfoot Mall, an enclosed shopping centre located in northeast Calgary named for Deerfoot-Bad Meat

== Other ==
- The Deerfoot series of novels by Edward S. Ellis
- The foot of a deer, or the dried meat produced from it

== See also ==
- Deerhoof, American rock band
