= John Levett (athlete) =

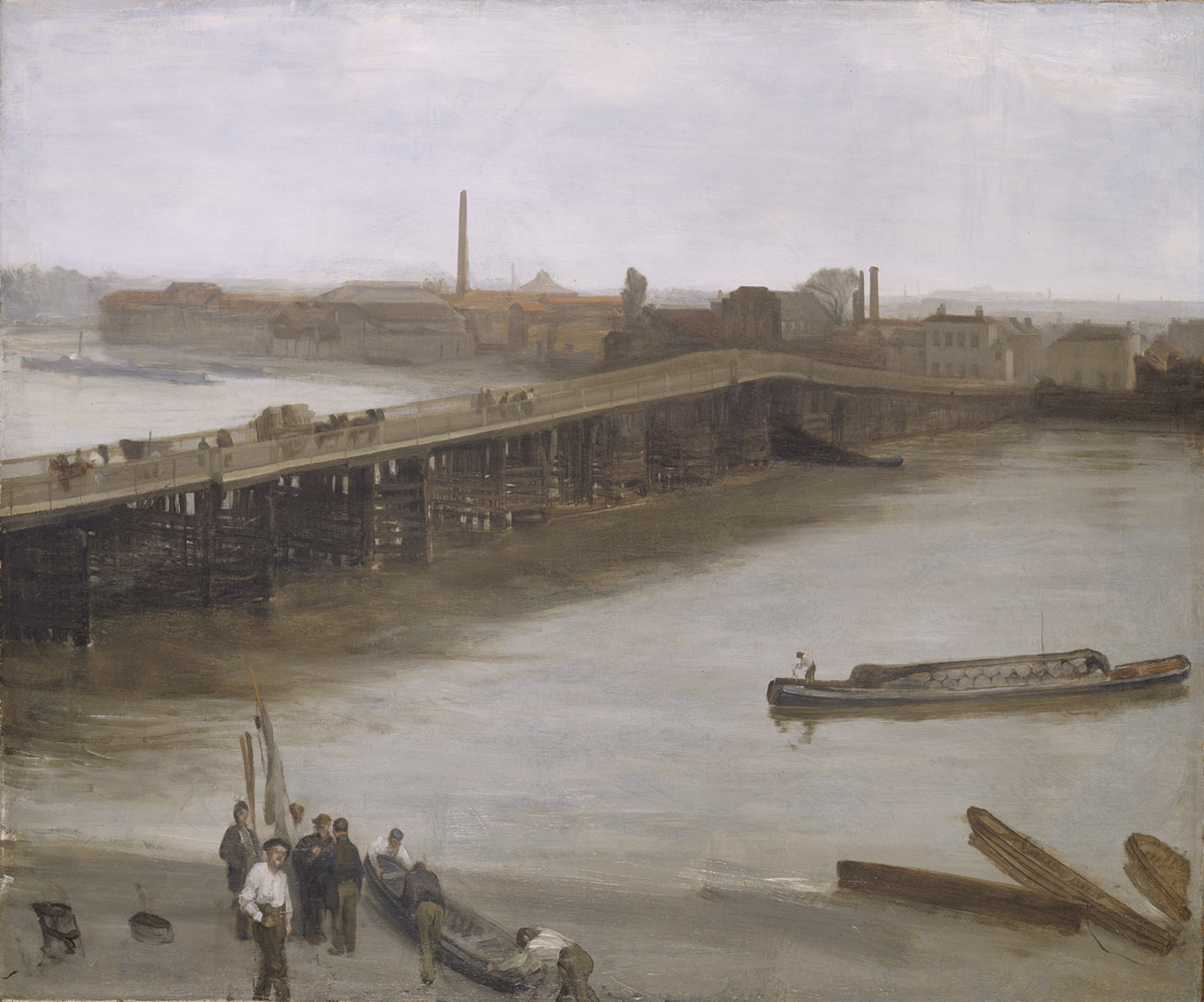
View of Battersea, home of John Levett, champion runner

John Levett (c. 1826 – August 1876) was a nineteenth-century athlete who was twice Champion Runner of England. In 1852 he ran 10 miles (16 km) in 51:42, his personal best time and a longtime world record.

Levett was born in about 1826, the eldest son of carpenter John Levett and his wife Sarah (née Yates). The family lived at York Street, later New Road, Battersea.

John Levett Jr. married Sarah Hannah Coulson, and the couple had five children between 1847 and 1856. Hannah and the children lived at York Street with her Levett in-laws, apparently because her husband was often away training or competing. Money was obviously tight, and Levett's running schedule seems to have left little time for much else.

For his training, John Levett ran at Garratt Lane, Wandsworth, and competed in a succession of races. In 1851 he ran 10 miles (16 km) in Hyde Park, Sheffield, earning £50. On 11 October 1852, running at Islington for the title of Champion Runner of England, Levett ran 10 miles (16 km) in under 52 minutes and won the title for the second time.

In August 1854 Levett ran at Birkenhead, near Liverpool, this time winning £100. At the competition, two gentlemen from Preston were looking for a man to run 11 miles (18 km) in one hour on one day and 20 miles (32 km) in two hours the following day. Each man had bet £100 for each match. Levett stayed at the Liverpool Arms, Duke Street, and trained at Hoylake and Aintree racecourses. The Star Hotel, Birkenhead was the headquarters.

Levett ran 11 miles (18 km) in 2 minutes under an hour at Rock Ferry on the Monday evening. On Tuesday he was clearly suffering from his previous efforts and gave up after running an hour and 29 minutes, completing 15 and a half miles. The race took its toll; Levett was suffering from exhaustion. Nevertheless, he then took £100 and £50 to run 21 miles (34 km) in 2 hours and was tied to do 11 miles (18 km) in the first hour, set for the following Monday in Liverpool. The financial rewards pushed Levett forward, but in those days the running was gruelling with men exerting themselves to the point where they frothed at the mouth.

Another match was near the Zoological gardens, Liverpool. Levett's opponent was Richard Manks of Warwickshire. They ran 15 miles (24 km) starting at 28 minutes to five. Manks gave up after 11 miles (18 km). Levett completed his 12th mile in exactly an hour and the fifteen miles (24 km) in one hour and 18 minutes.

Levett then undertook to run 21 miles (34 km) in two hours on Monday next on the same ground.

On Sunday 15 April 1855, another match was scheduled, pitting James (aka Jem) Pudney of Mile End against Levett at Mr Sadler's enclosed ground at Garratt Lane, Wandsworth. The day of the race dawned gray and rainy, but 2,000 spectators still showed up for the competition, in which Levett was favoured. At the outset of the race Levett appeared in fine physical condition, while Pudney looked to be suffering.

Levett dominated the race nearly all the way, with Pudney making headway only one or twice. In the fifth mile Pudney gained more than 100 yards on his competitor, but soon gave signs of distress. Pudney continued running but eventually gave out of exhaustion and dropped out. Levett ran at a more leisurely pace and was an easy winner. At the time of the race, Pudney was the country's champion but his poor performance cost him his title, which he ceded to Levett.

Just over a month later, on 20 May 1855 there was a rematch at Wandsworth between the two champions. Pudney gave Levett a 100-yard head start in the abbreviated six-mile (10 km) race. Levett began at a rapid clip, and for a while the two were neck and neck. After a while Levett took the lead. At the fourth mile, covered in 21 minutes, he led Pudney by three yards in a close race. By the fifth mile Levett was leading. But suddenly Pudney shot by his opponent and left Levett increasingly in the rear, winning by 40 yards. Both runners were exhausted and had to be carried off by their friends. Levett was crestfallen.

Headlines in July 1855 newspapers announced: "Tomorrow the once-renowned 10-mile runner and Richard Manks, the 'Warwickshire Antelope', run at Hyde Park, Sheffield for £50".

Soon afterwards, there was a 10-mile (16 km) handicap race at Garratt Lane, Wandsworth, with William Jackson ("the American Deer"), Charles Cook (of Marylebone), Levett, and William Newman all competing. A runner named Frost was favored, with Levett in the back of the pack. Ultimately Levett won the race in 54 minutes 7 seconds.

Later in 1855, Levett was accused with William Thompson of causing a nuisance in Grainger Street, Newcastle upon Tyne, outside the Grainger hotel. Thompson was accused of inciting others, cursing them, calling them thieves and prizefighters. Levett jumped in to the rescue just as the police arrived and was subsequently charged with disorderly conduct. He said "I may be a public man but I am always honest". The same year, Levett ran again at Hyde Park, Sheffield, against Manks, defeating him; it was the fastest race ever run there.

6 January 1856: Levett ran 10 miles (16 km) against Rowan of Gateshead in front of 2,000 people and was victorious when Rowan gave up, exhausted.

On 13 August 1856: Levett was beaten by the Scottish champion Thomas Kerr, in Edinburgh. John Levett had actually based himself in Edinburgh from the spring of 1856 and continued his sporting career from there. He sent written articles to the American newspapers where his career had been followed keenly. In 1856 he wrote to the New York Clipper "As my friends and I consider that I have been ill-used by the present world champion, James Pudney, perhaps you will allow me, as an old, and when in my best day, not the slowest pedestrian, to say a few words for the last time, considering the championship. Before going into Scotland in the spring of the year, I challenged all the world for the championship, having first proved, that the celebrated clipper, John Levett, was once more, after so much hard training, coming to his old form. The invincible Pudney did not answer that challenge, yet still retained "champion" to his name. Some two months since, I again challenged the world. The gallant James agreed to sign and stake as soon as I made a deposit; but that also came to nothing, though my money was up. To give him one more chance I am still open to run any man breathing, 10 miles for £50 odds, on 1 January 1857. If this is not accepted, I shall sign myself, in future, John Levett, Champion of the World."

In 1857 Levett was back at Garratt Lane, Wandsworth but a report noted that he was out of shape and Levett did indeed lose the match. Shortly afterwards, Levett became the proprietor of the Victoria running ground in Newcastle and he ran at Manchester.

In Dublin, Ireland, on 17 October 1860 a local newspaper reported that Levett wished to walk 1,000 miles (1,600 km) in 1,000 hours, beginning at Mr Doyle's hotel in Sandymount.

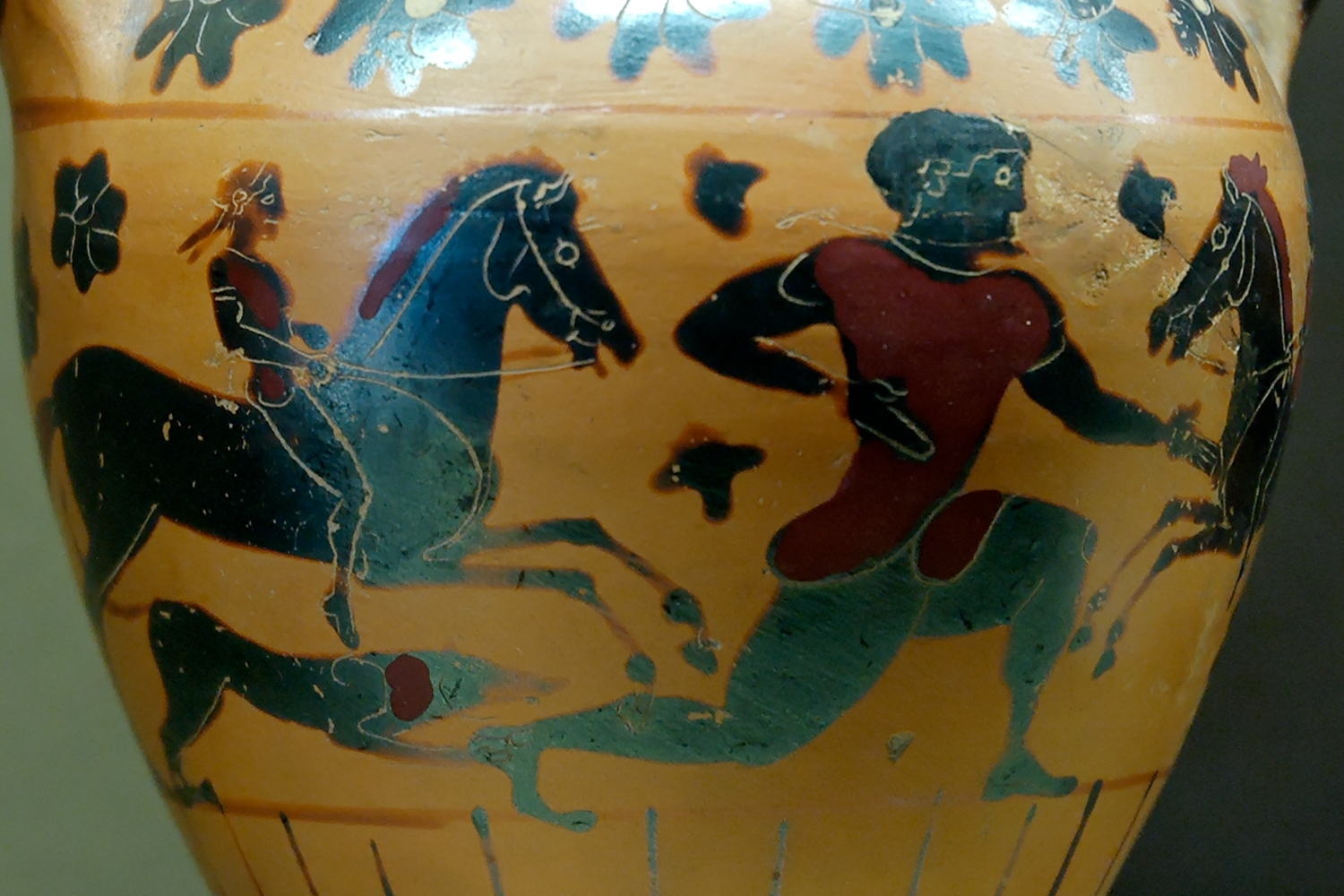
Running: A popular sport since ancient times

By 1860 Levett was listed as manager of a running establishment in Dublin, holding grand competitions at La Rotunda and offering training and instruction classes in athletics. It was in Dublin that he challenged a "Red Indian" called Deerfoot, to a 10-mile (16 km) race. It was an exciting event which saw the Native American Deerfoot win with an Indian whoop. Deerfoot ran 10 miles (16 km) in exactly 52 minutes, watched by a large crowd of 6,000 spectators. Levett retired after completing five miles (8.0 km) in 26 minutes and 45 secs.

John Levett later taught swimming and patented a new type of swimming float. It was in Blackpool in August 1876 that John and a group of professional swimmers put on some entertainment at the end of the pier to show the advantage of using the floats, called bladders, to an attentive audience. Levett was first in the water, followed by three young women. It soon became apparent that the waves were far too high and they were in difficulties, the tide sucking them towards Fleetwood. The first girl in the water clung to Levett, who was wearing his float, whilst a man called Bibbero, plunged in to save another girl. The other young lady was also rescued. Nobody attempted to launch a boat for some time to rescue Levett and the girl who was still clinging to him for her life. Eventually, a boat was launched and reached the two, bringing them to the shore where they were taken to the Derby Hotel. The girl was able to walk away but despite fervent attempts, Levett would not revive. He was fifty years old.

John had established a new life for himself in Edinburgh leaving his London family behind, therefore the death certificate for his wife, Sarah Hannah Levett, can be found among the records for the Isle of Thanet, where she moved to be near her son, Edwin, who became proprietor of the Metropolitan Infirmary (a therapeutic establishment for sickly and scrofulaous children in Margate), and to her daughter Esther, who lived nearby and had married the previous proprietor of the infirmary, John Weekley.
