= Charles Francis Horne =

American author and college professor (1870–1942)

Charles Francis Horne (January 12, 1870 – September 13, 1942) was an American author. He wrote or edited more than one hundred books, mostly multi-volume history works. He was a Professor of English at City College of New York.

Horne was born in Jersey City, New Jersey. He died in Annapolis, Maryland.

== Books ==
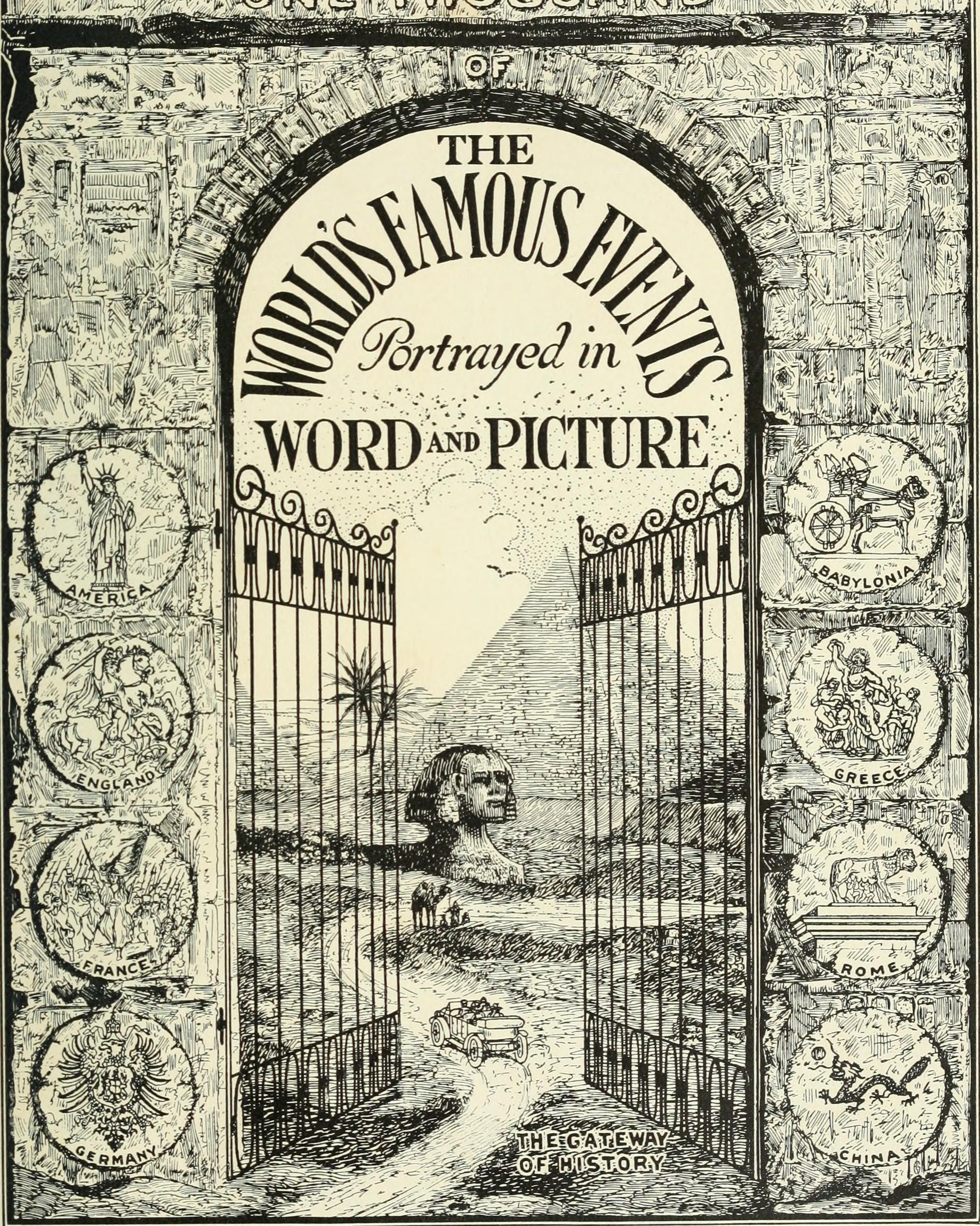
The World's Famous Events Portrayed in Word and Picture

Horne's most notable works include:

- The Code of Hammurabi ISBN 1-60506-051-8
- Great Men and Famous Women (1894)
- The Bible and Its Story, Taught By One Thousand Picture Lessons, 10 volumes (1908)
- Sacred Books and Early Literature of the East, 14 volumes (1917)
- The Great Events by Famous Historians
- The Works of Jules Verne, 15 volumes (1911)
- The Protevangelium or Original Gospel of James
- Source Records of the Great War ISBN 4-87187-873-2
- The Stories of the Greatest Nations (with Edward S. Ellis) ISBN 4-87187-874-0
- Spain: The Story of a Great Nation (with Ellis) ISBN 4-87187-875-9
- Russia: The Story of a Great Nation (with Ellis) ISBN 4-87187-874-0
