= The Bible and Its Story, Taught by One Thousand Picture Lessons =

Children's book

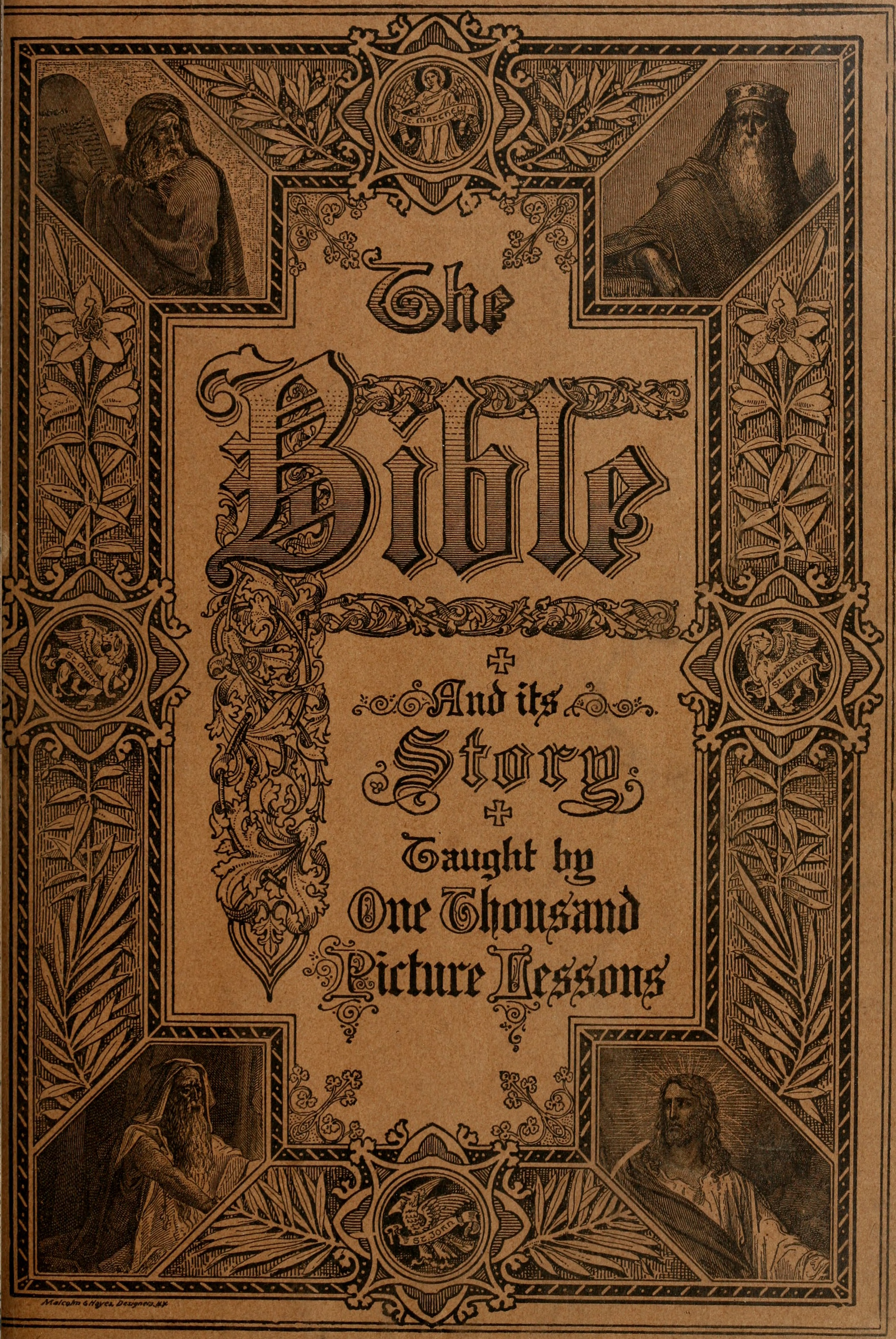
- Editor: Charles F. Horne
- Illustrator: Michelangelo, Raphael, Leonardo da Vinci, Titian, Botticelli, Rembrandt, Sir Lawrence Alma-Tadema, et al.
- Genre: Juvenile literature
- Publisher: Francis R. Niglutsch

The Bible and Its Story, Taught by One Thousand Picture Lessons is a pedagogical children's book series in 10 volumes published Francis R. Niglutsch in 1908 and 1909 illustrating pivotal scenes from the Holy Bible; edited by Charles F. Horne and Julius August Brewer, it is in the public domain.

The compilation featured artwork from over 70 artists, from renaissance masters to artists living at the time. Notable Victorian artist Sir Lawrence Alma-Tadema's etchings are from late in his career.

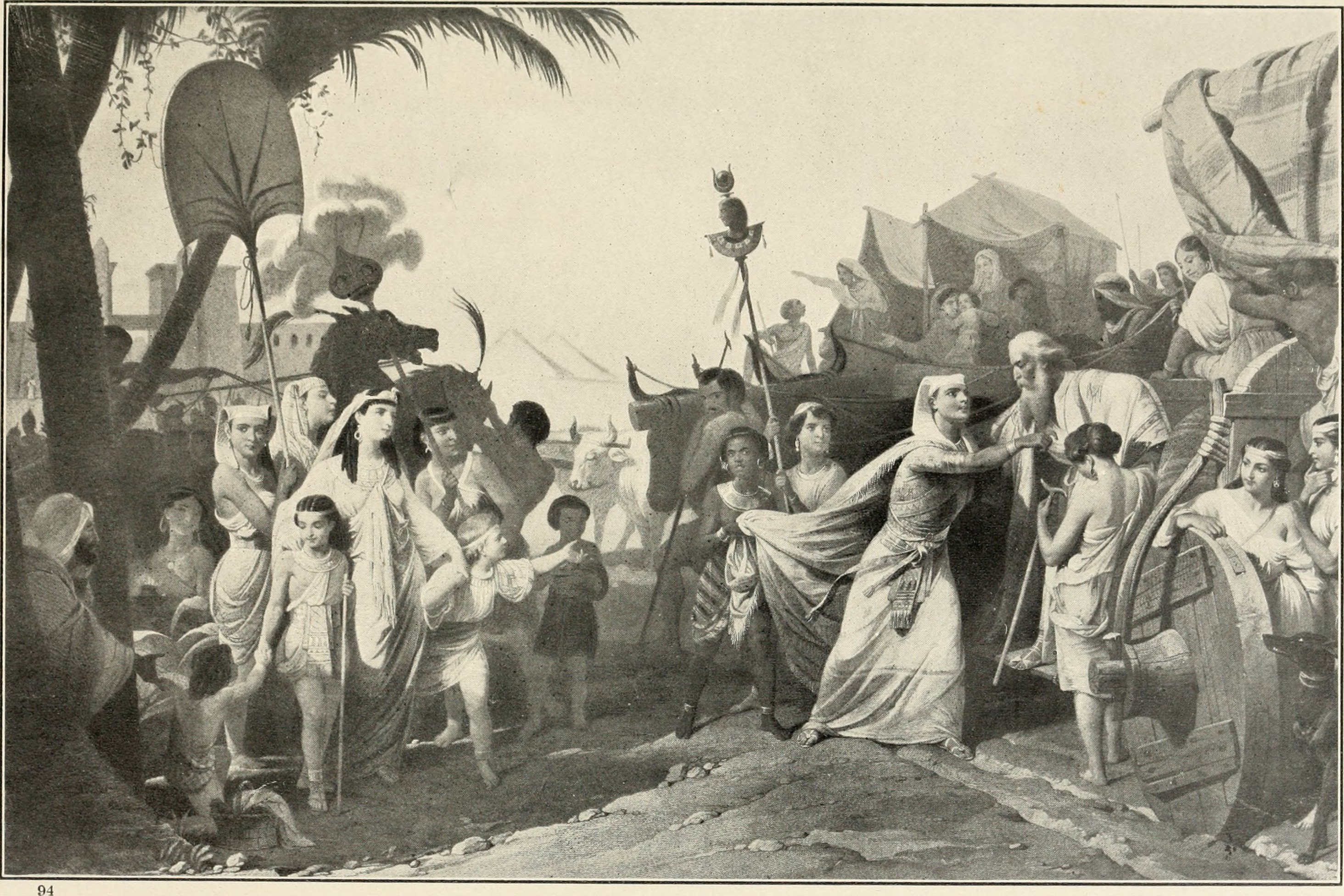
One of Alma-Tadema's etchings depicts Joseph's return to his people

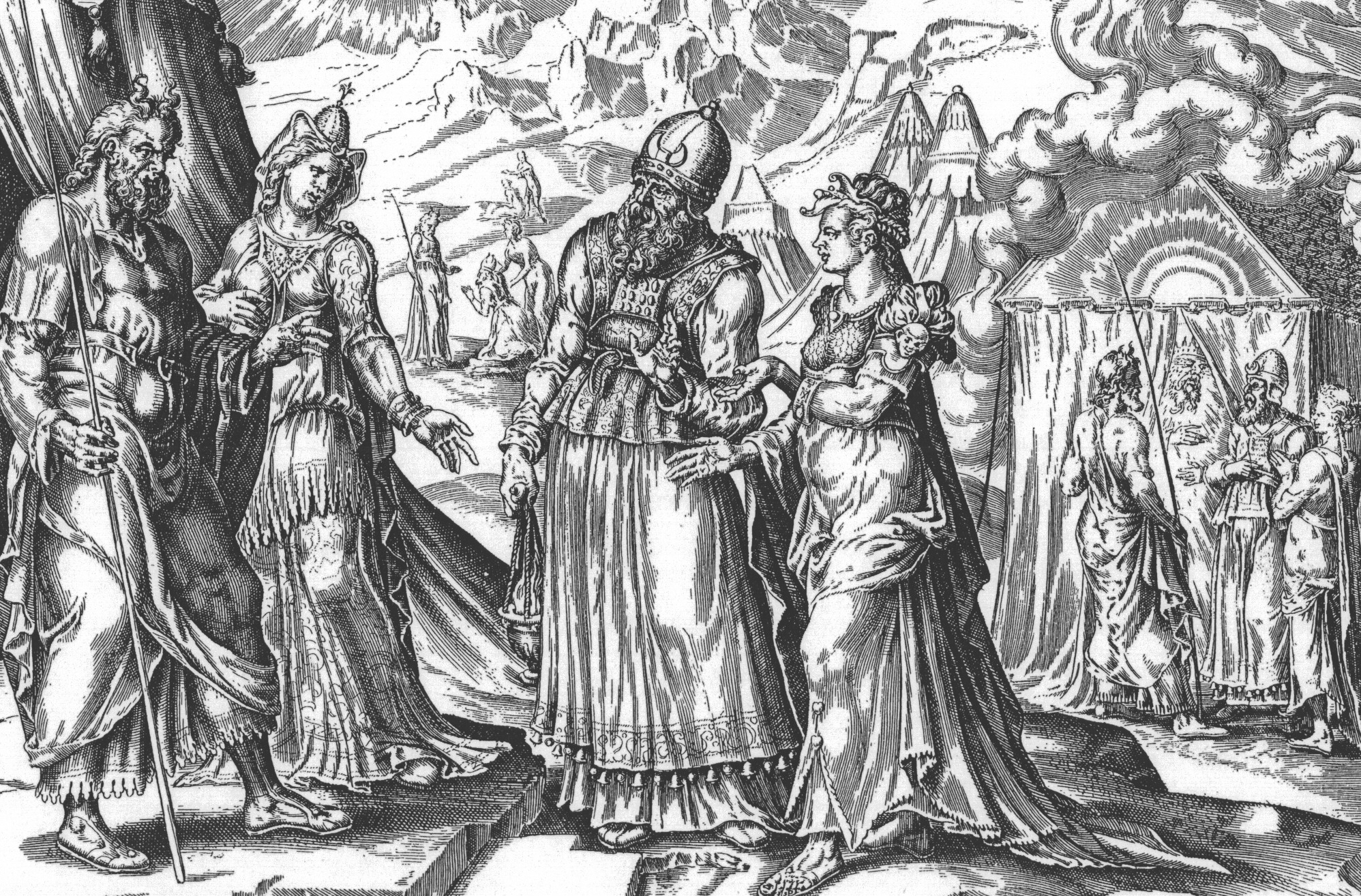
Miriam and her brother Aaron argue a point of comparative religion with Moses and his Midianite (or Kushite) wife Zipporah

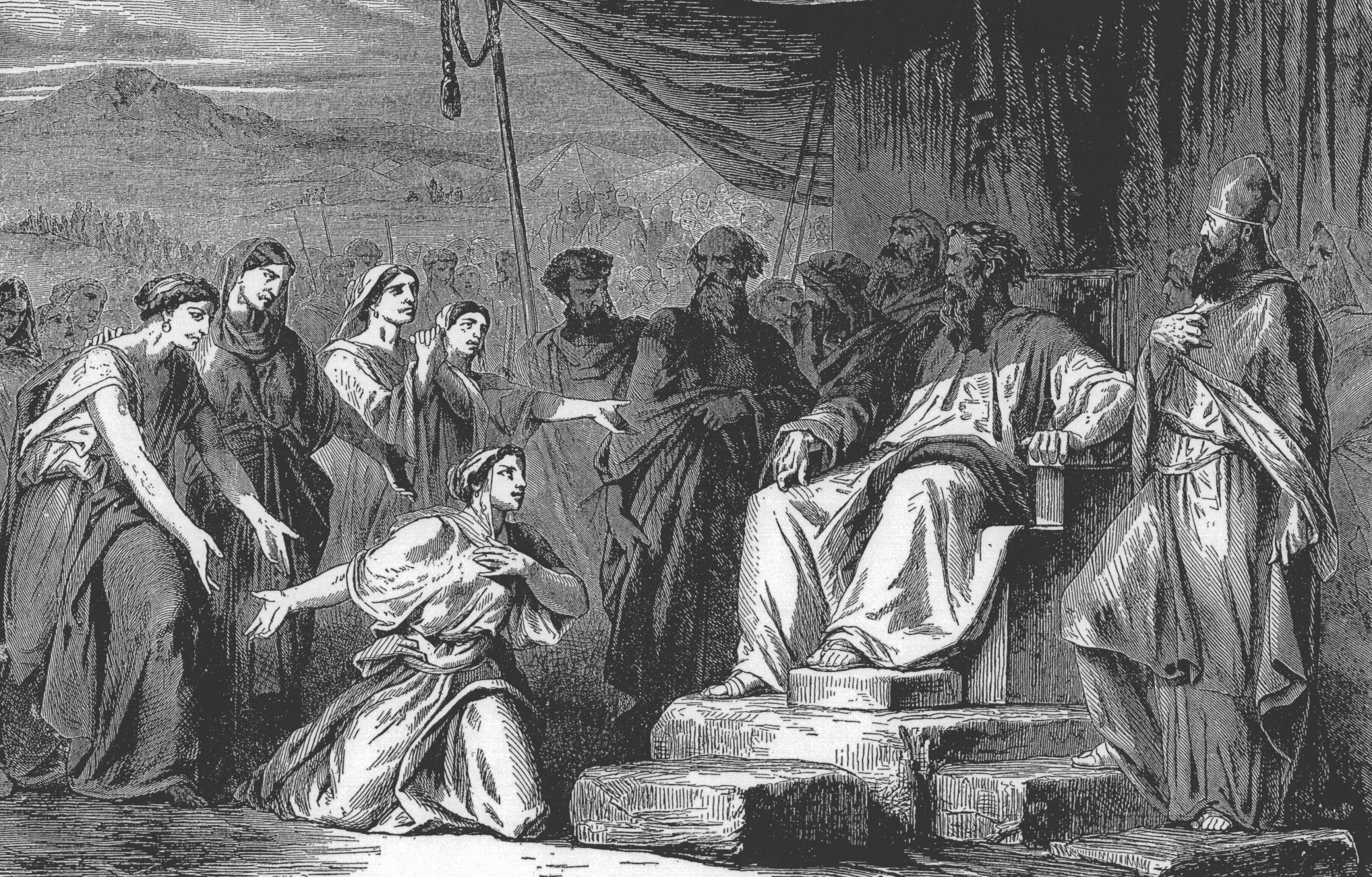
The Daughters of Zelophehad

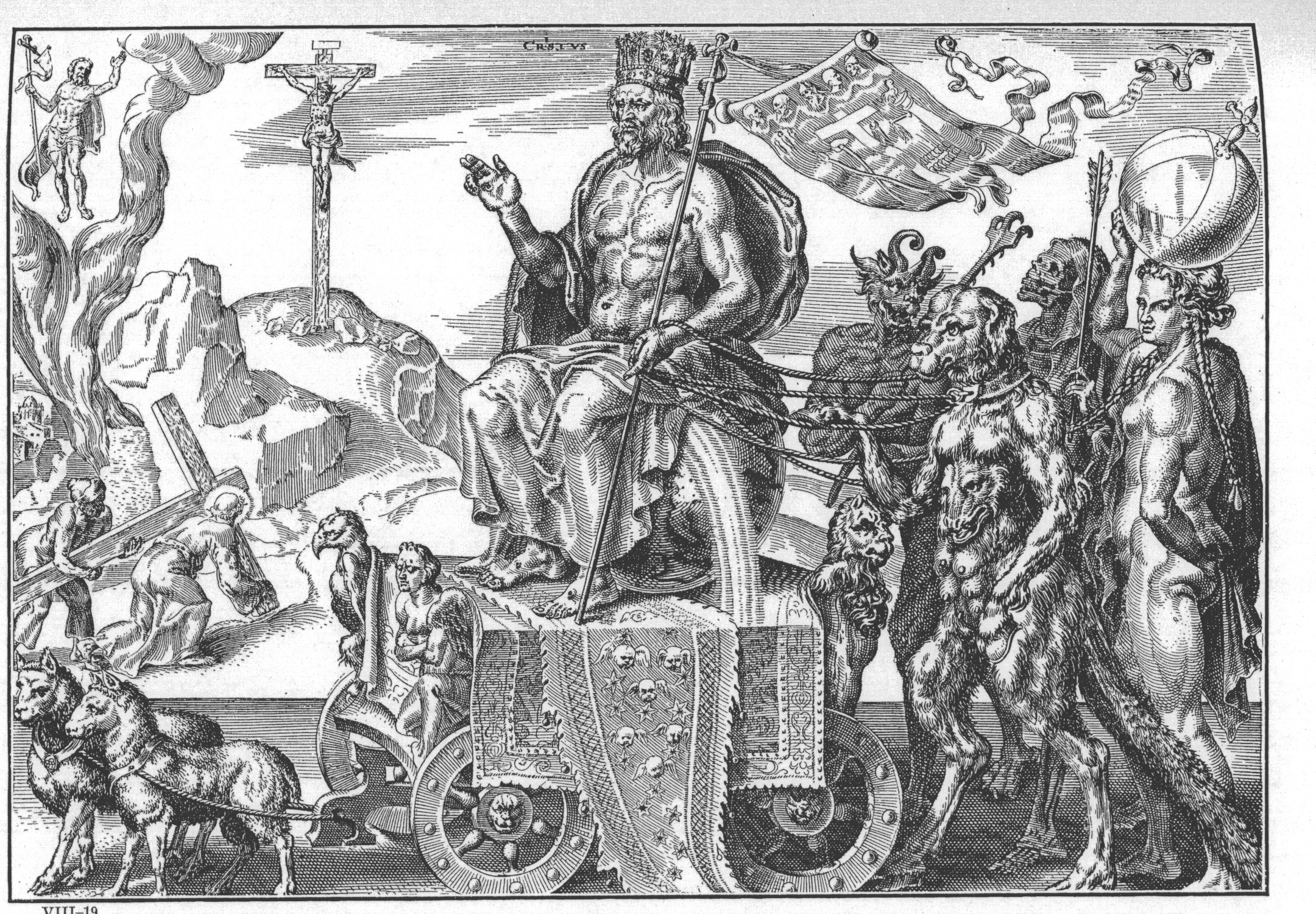
Ezekiel 34:25 by an unknown Italian artist, published by Francis R. Niglutsch, New York, in 1908. vol. 8.

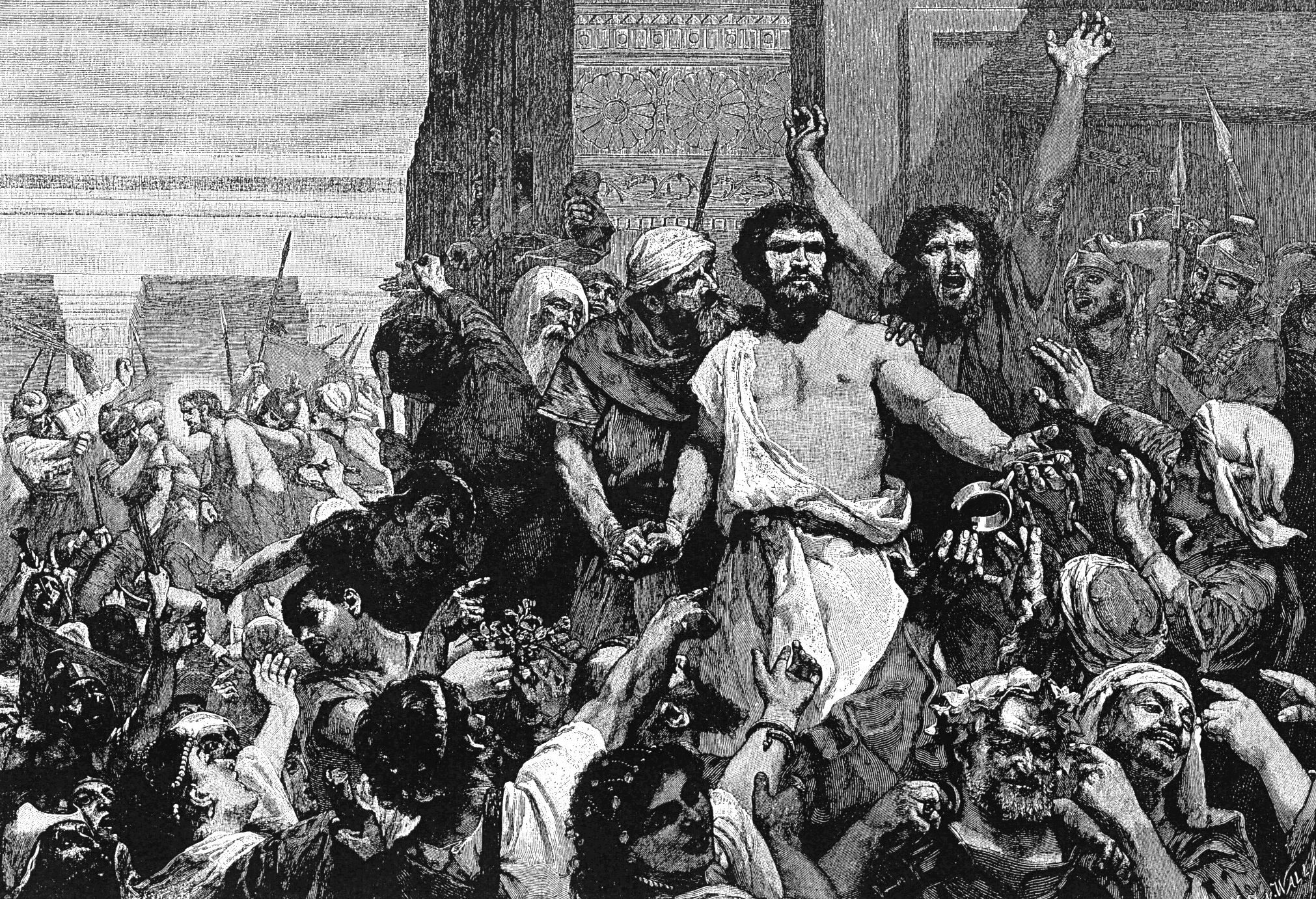
Give Us Barabbas!
