= Edward S. Ellis =

American novelist (1840–1916)

Edward Sylvester Ellis
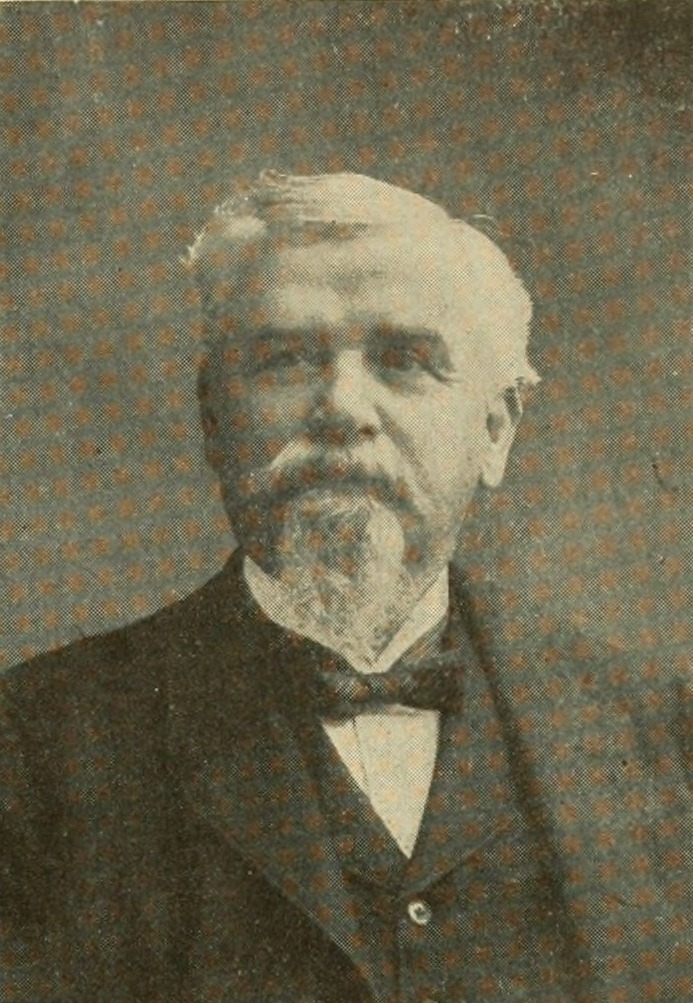
- Born: April 11, 1840; Geneva, Ohio
- Died: June 20, 1916 (aged 76); Cliff Island, Maine
- Other names: James Fenimore Cooper Adams; Captain Bruin Adams; Boynton M. Belknap; J. G. Bethune; Captain Latham C. Carleton; Frank Faulkner; Capt. R. M. Hawthorne; Lieut. Ned Hunter; Charles E. Lasalle; H. R. Millbank; Billex Muller; Lieut. J. H. Randolph; Emerson Rodman; E. A. St. Mox; Seelin Robins
- Education: Master of Arts (Princeton 1877)
- Occupation: Author
- Spouses: Anna M. Deane (m. 1862–1887) Clara Spalding Brown (m. 1900)
- Parent(s): Sylvester Ellis; Mary Ellis

Notes
- Information sourced from NIU Beadle and Adams Novel Digitization Project

Edward Sylvester Ellis (April 11, 1840 – June 20, 1916) was an American author.

Ellis was a teacher, school administrator, journalist, and the author of hundreds of books and magazine articles that he produced by his name and by a number of pen names. Notable fiction stories by Ellis include The Steam Man of the Prairies and Seth Jones, or the Captives of the Frontier. Internationally, Edward S. Ellis is probably known best for his Deerfoot novels read widely by young boys until the 1950s.

== Dime novels ==
Seth Jones was a prototypical early dime novel published by Beadle and Adams. It is said that Seth Jones was one of Abraham Lincoln's favorite stories. During the mid-1880s, after a fiction-writing career of some thirty years, Ellis eventually began composing more serious works of biography, history, and persuasive writing. Of note was "The Life of Colonel David Crockett", which had the story of Davy Crockett giving a speech usually called "Not Yours To Give". It was a speech in opposition to awarding money to a Navy widow on the grounds that Congress had no Constitutional mandate to give charity. It was said to have been inspired by Crockett's meeting with a Horatio Bunce, a much quoted man in Libertarian circles, but one for whom historical evidence is non-existent.

== Pseudonyms ==
Besides the one hundred fifty-nine books published by his own name, Ellis' work was published under various pseudonyms, including:

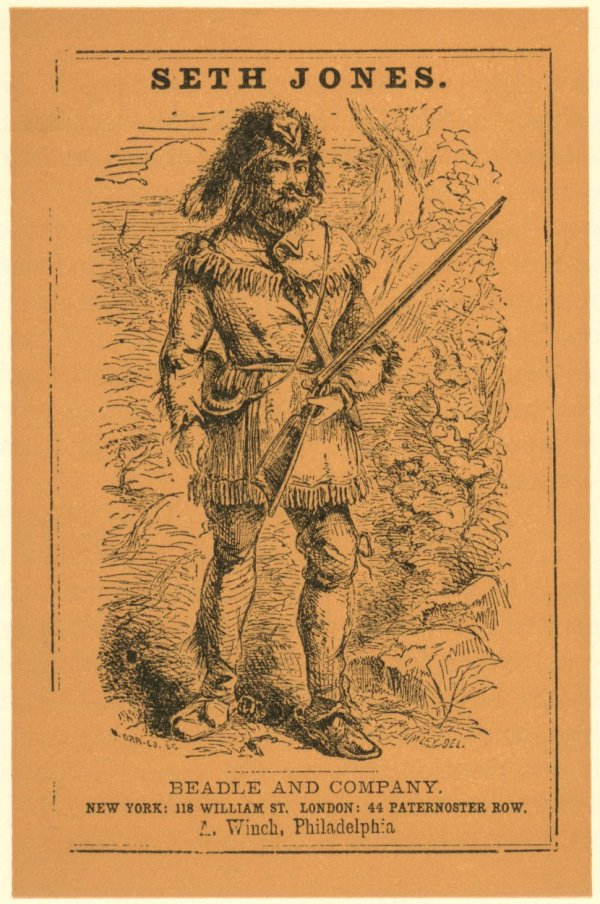
Cover of Seth Jones; or, The Captives of the Frontier by Edward S. Ellis

- "James Fenimore Cooper Adams" or "Captain Bruin Adams" (68 titles)
- "Boynton M. Belknap" (9 titles)
- "J. G. Bethune" (1 title)
- "Captain Latham C. Carleton" (2 titles)
- "Frank Faulkner" (1 title)
- "Capt. R. M. Hawthorne" (4 titles)
- "Lieut. Ned Hunter" (5 titles)
- "Lieut. R. H. Jayne" (at least 2 titles in the War Whoop series)
- "Charles E. Lasalle" (16 titles)
- "H. R. Millbank" (3 titles)
- "Billex Muller" (3 titles)
- "Lieut. J. H. Randolph" (8 titles)
- "Emerson Rodman" (10 titles)
- "Colonel H. R. Gordon" (6 titles)
- "E. A. St. Mox" (2 titles)
- "Seelin Robins" (19 titles)

== Partial bibliography ==
famous American naval commanders 1899 by edwards . ellis

- Seth Jones, or the Captives of the Frontier (1860)
- The Steam Man of the Prairies (1868)
- The Forest Monster (1870)
- Life and Times of Daniel Boone...with Sketches of Simon Kenton, Lewis Wetzel, and Other Leaders in the Settlement of the West (1884)
- A Young Hero (1888)
- The Boy Hunters of Kentucky (1889)
- On The Trail Of The Moose (1894)
- Across Texas (1894)
- The Young Scout (1895)
- Cowmen and Rustlers: A Story of Wyoming Cattle Ranges in 1892. (1898)
- Lost in the Rockies (1898)
- The Life of Kit Carson; Hunter, Trapper, Guide, Indian Agent, and Colonel U.S.A. (189
- A Strange Craft And Its Wonderful Voyage (1900)
- Deerfoot on the Prairies (1905)
- The Flying Boys in the Sky (1911)
- The Boy Patrol on Guard (1913)
- The Dragon of the Skies (1915)
- The Stories of the Greatest Nations (with Charles Francis Horne) ISBN 4-87187-874-0
- Spain: The Story of a Great Nation (with Charles Francis Horne) ISBN 4-87187-875-9
- Russia: The Story of a Great Nation (with Charles Francis Horne) ISBN 4-87187-874-0

=== Deerfoot series ===
Ellis' best known books follow the adventures of Deerfoot of the Shawnee, a young Native American brave based on the historical character of the same name who was renowned for his skill with the bow, and his abilities as a runner.

- Deerfoot in the Forest
- The Hunters of the Ozark
- Deerfoot in the Mountains
- Deerfoot on the Prairies
- The Camp in the Mountains (London: Cassell and Company, 1897)
- The Last War Trail (Philadelphia: The John C. Winston Company, 1884)

=== Log Cabin series ===
This series introduces the characters Oskar Relstaub and Jack Carleton. Deerfoot appears in the second and third books.

- The Lost Trail (Philadelphia: Porter & Coates, 1884)
- Campfire and Wigwam (Philadelphia: Porter & Coates, 1885)
- Footprints in the Forest (Philadelphia: Porter & Coates, 1886)

=== Other series ===
Further series of books written by Ellis included the following:

- The Arizona Series
- Boone and Kenton Series
- Boy Pioneer Series
- Catamount Camp Series
- Colonial Series
- The Flying Boys Series
- Foreign Adventure Series
- Great American Series
- New Deerfoot Series
- The Northwest Series
- Overland Series
- Paddle Your Own Canoe Series
- True Grit Series
- Warchief Series
- Wild-Wood Series
- Wyoming Series
