= Deerfoot City =

Shopping centre in Calgary, Alberta, Canada

Coordinates: 51.1085°N 114.0417°W

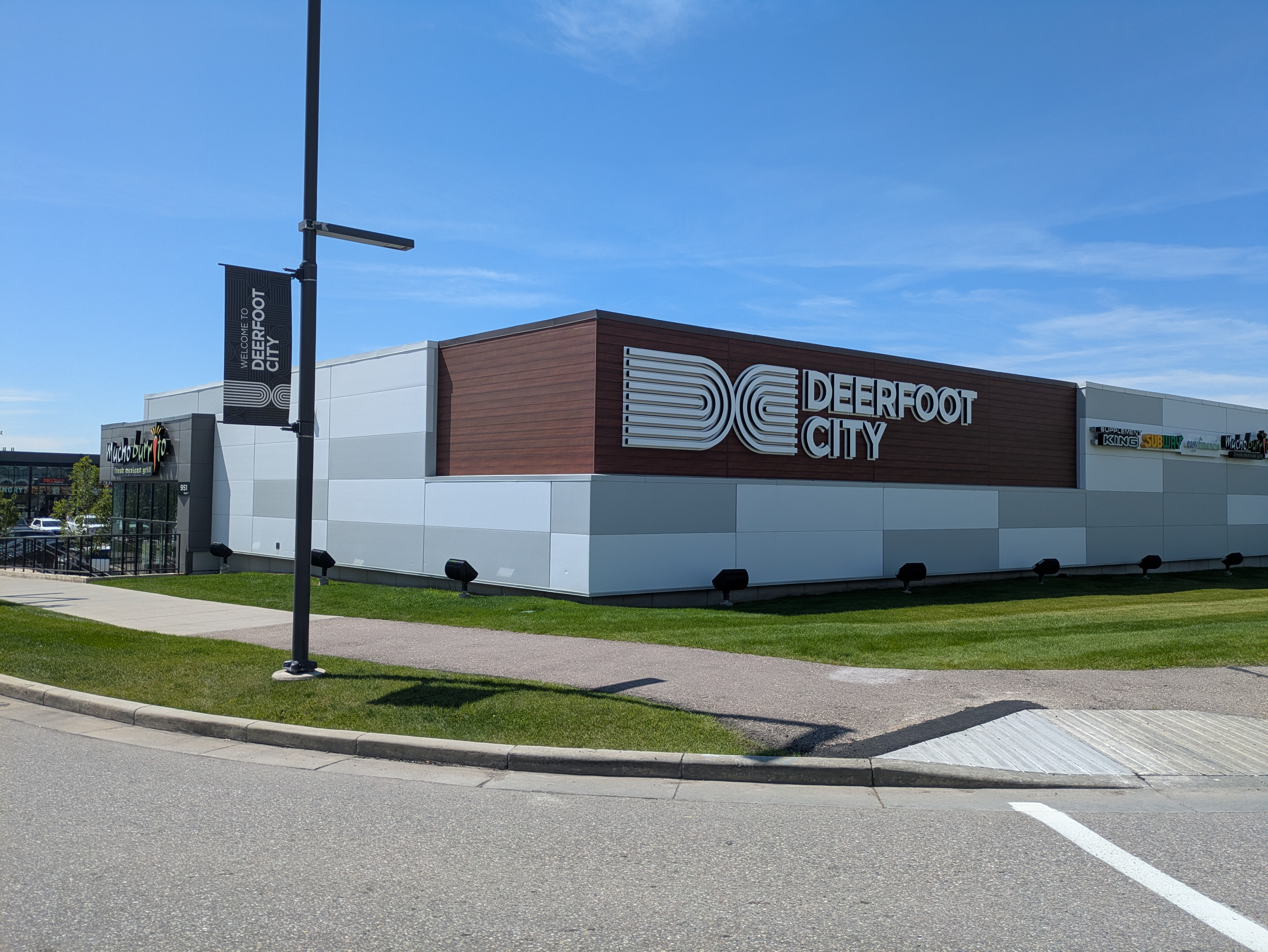
Deerfoot City as seen from 64th Ave NE

Deerfoot City is an outdoor shopping centre located in northeast Calgary, Alberta, Canada. It opened in 1981 as Deerfoot Outlet Mall, just east of Deerfoot Trail (Highway 2) on 64th Avenue NE. The 1.1 million square foot shopping centre, owned by Shape Properties, sits on an 80-acre site.

== History ==
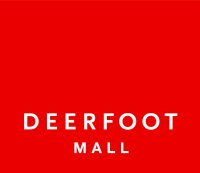
Deerfoot Mall logo

Upon its opening, the mall's anchor tenants were Woolco, Canada Safeway, and The Bay. The original mall featured 80 retailers, including a mixture of chain and independent businesses, a bowling alley, and a food court. During the mall's early history, all three anchors closed or were rebranded: Woolco became Walmart; Safeway closed; and The Bay location was taken over by Sears Canada. Eventually, the former Safeway location was divided up into several smaller retailers, including Winners.

By the 1990s, Deerfoot Mall was considered an "outlet mall," billing itself as "Western Canada's only enclosed outlet mall."

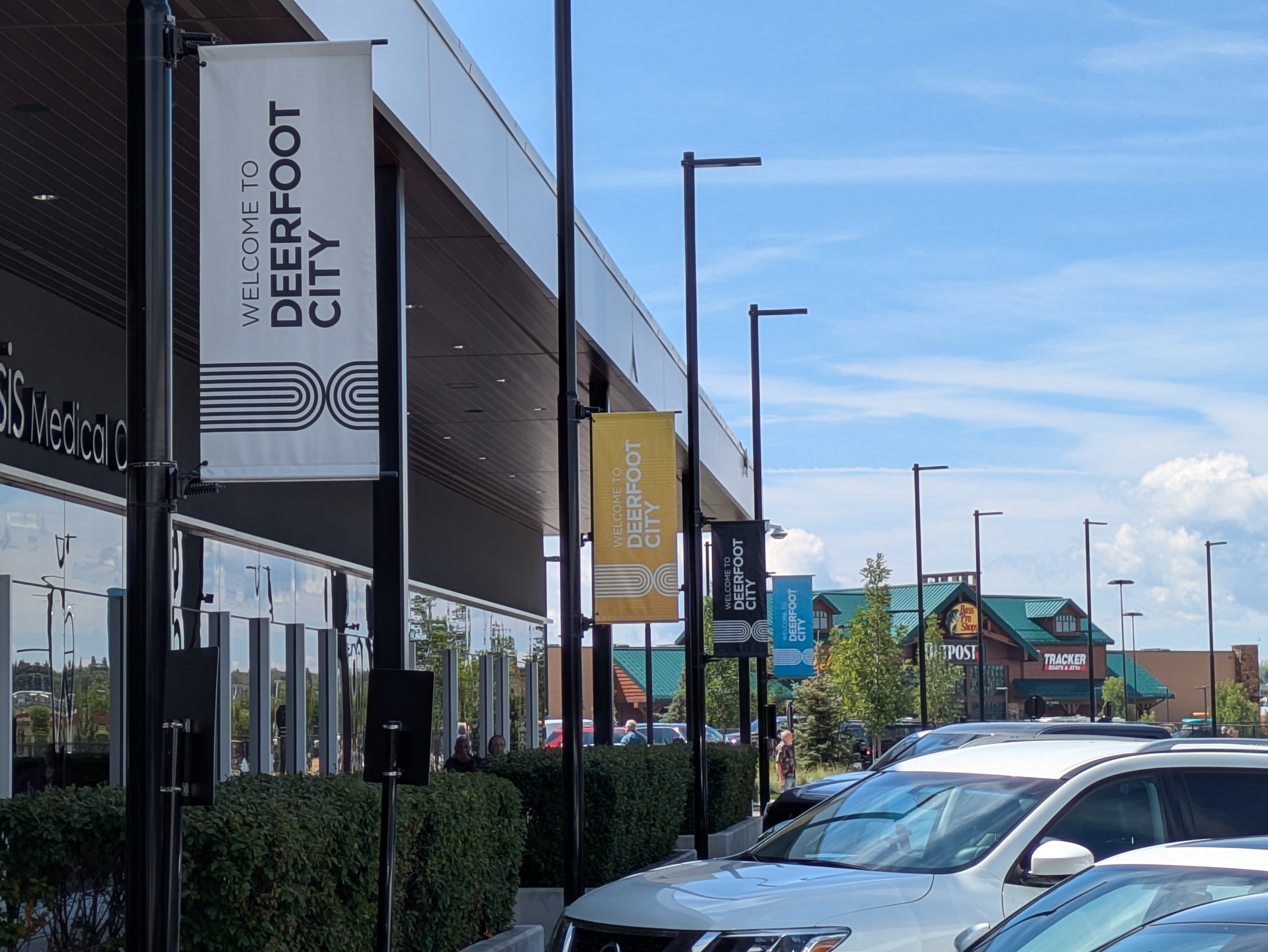
Deerfoot City as seen from inside

In the 2000s, both Walmart and Sears closed their locations within the mall, with Walmart opening a standalone store to the immediate southeast of the building, and Sears closing its store altogether. This left Winners and the bowling alley as the mall's last remaining anchors, though both the former Walmart and Sears locations were redeveloped for other retailers.

A plan announced in September 2013 called for converting the enclosed mall into an open-air regional centre and add over 500,000 additional square feet of retail space. It was subsequently renamed Destination: Deerfoot City.

On January 31, 2016, the majority of the existing 623,000-square-foot enclosed mall closed to make way for the next phase of redevelopment.

As of 2019, major anchors include LensCrafters, Walmart, GoodLife Fitness, Dollarama, Winners, The Rec Room, Canadian Tire, and Cabela's. The original mall structure has been split into multiple sections that are separated by roadways, with larger retailers taking up locations along the property's periphery.

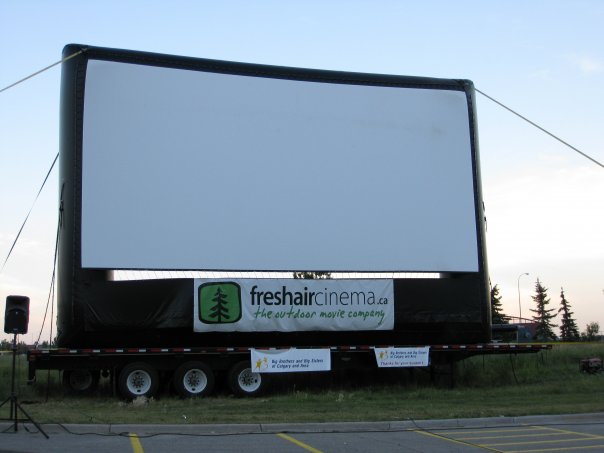
Deerfoot Mall often hosted special events in its parking lot, ranging from circuses to drive-in movie nights

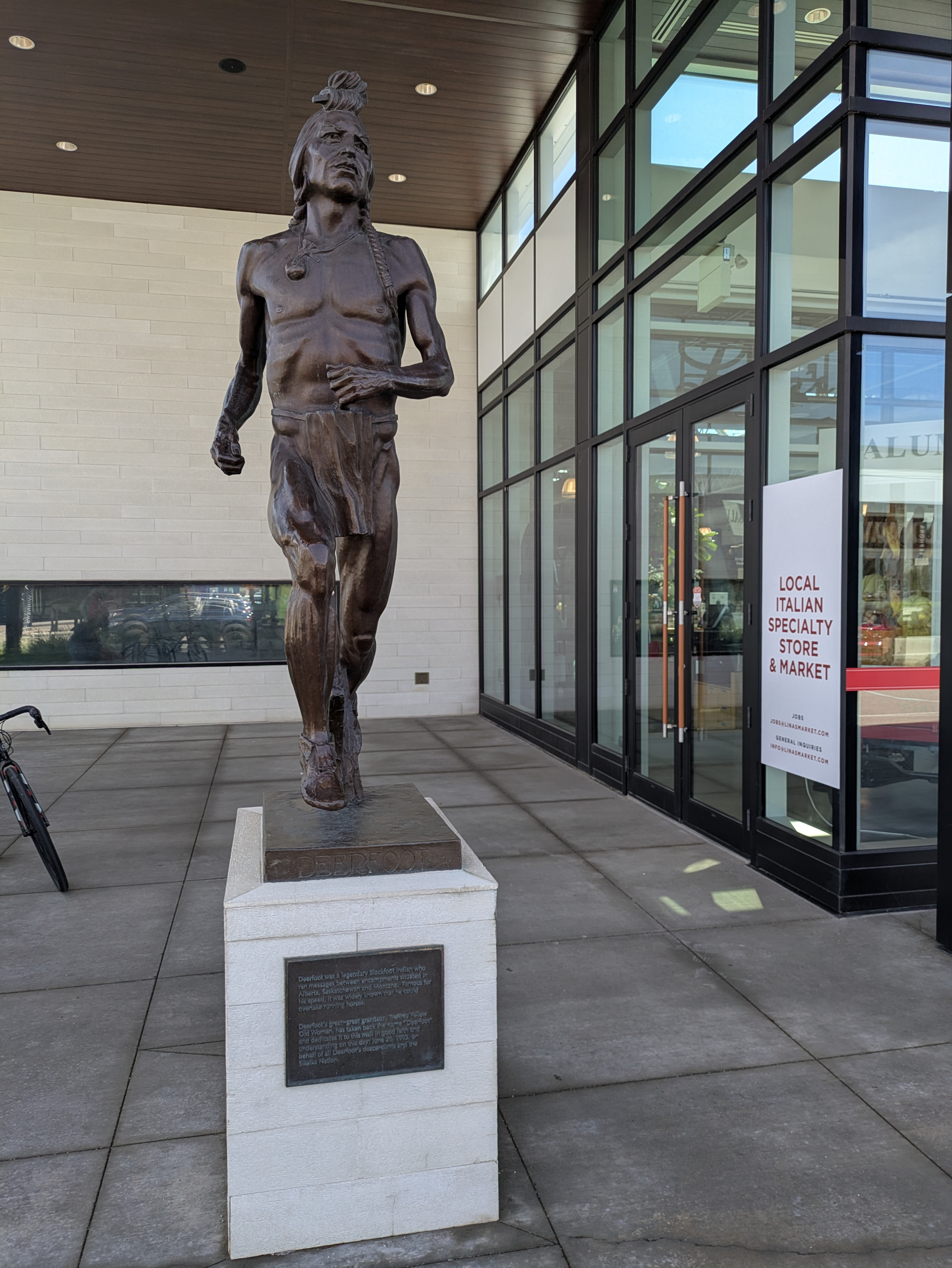
Statue of Deerfoot-Bad Meat at Deerfoot City

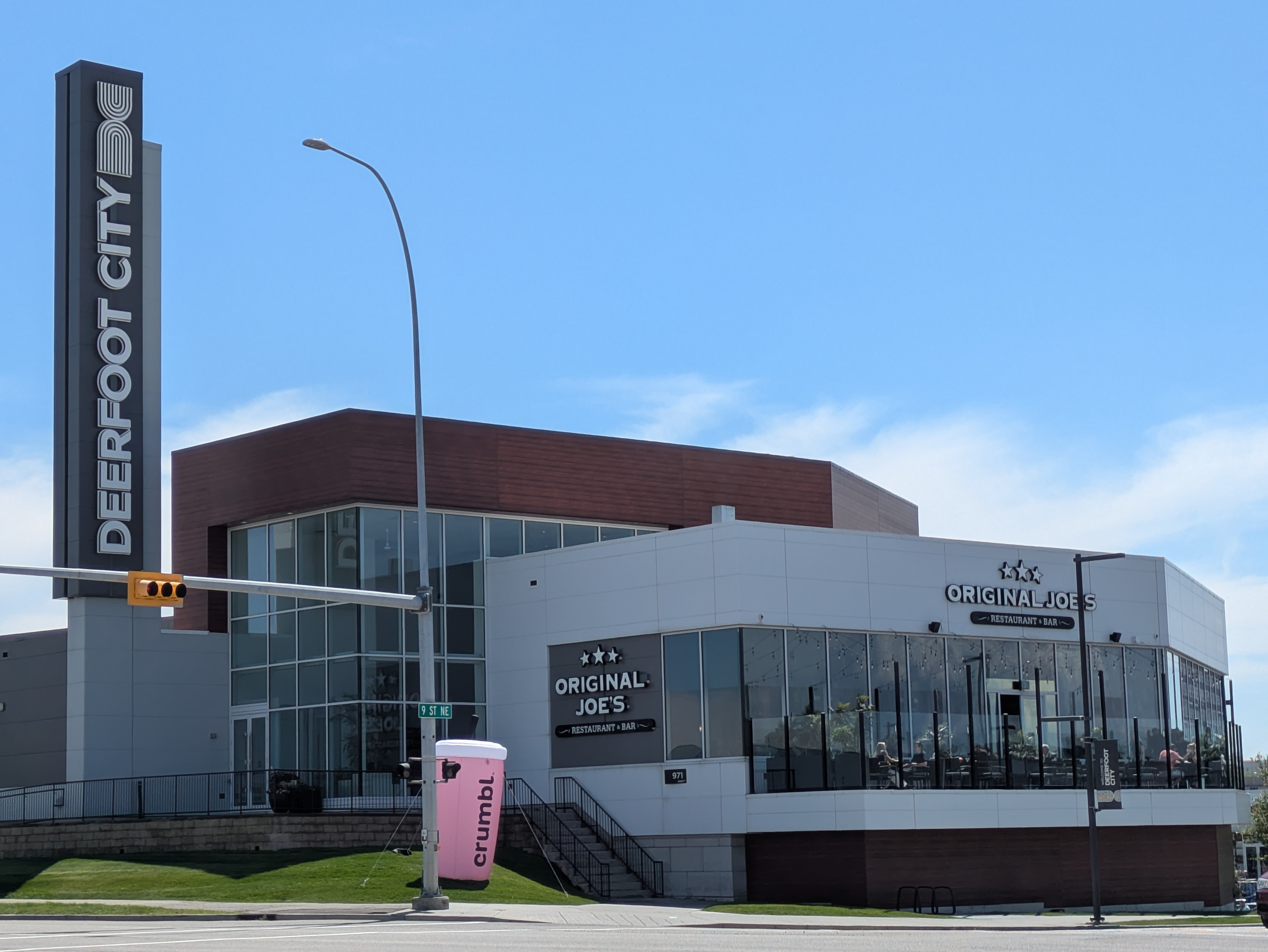
Original Joe's at Deerfoot City

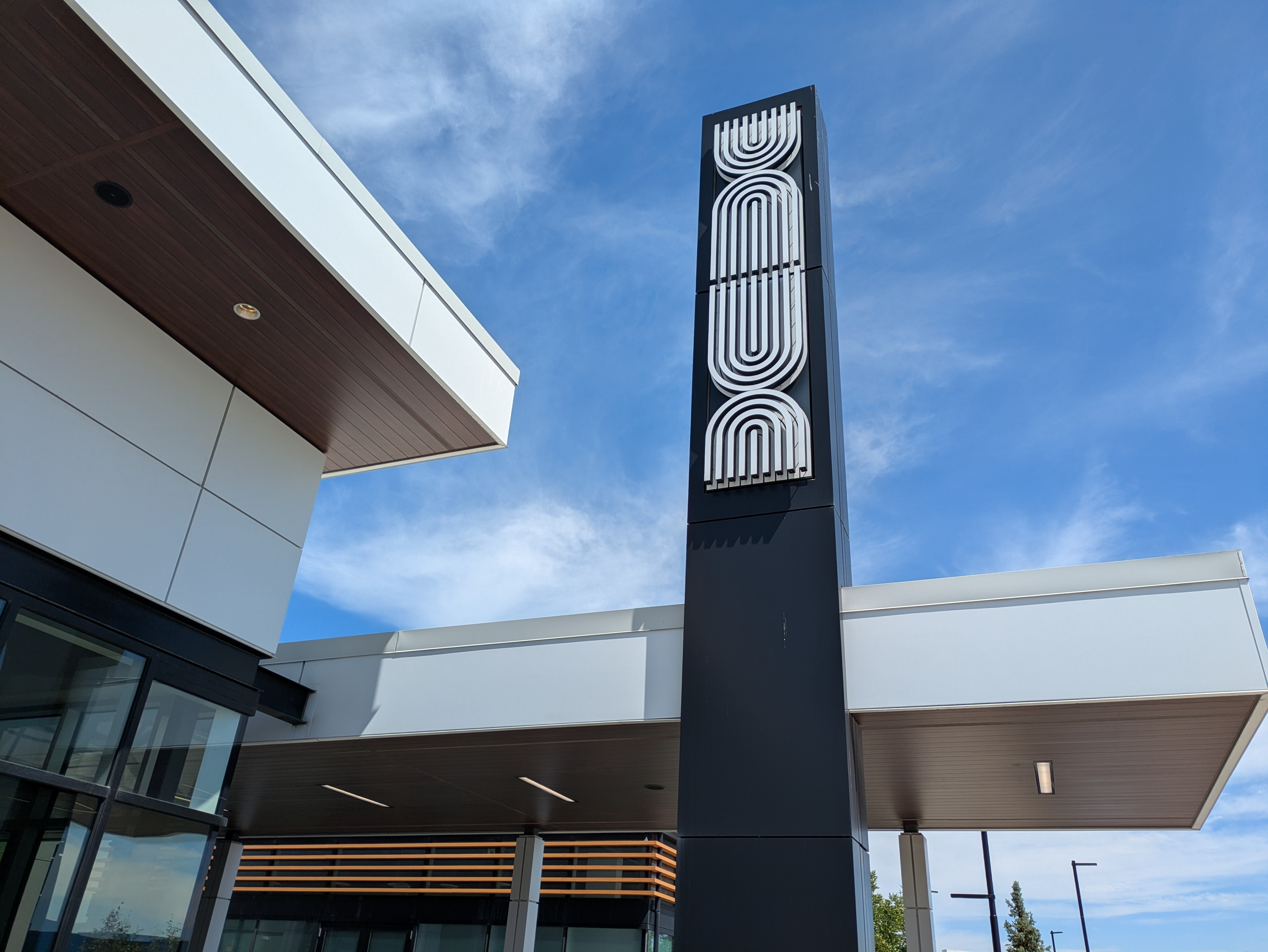
Deerfoot City logo on a building

== See also ==
- List of shopping malls in Canada
