= Deerfoot =

American Seneca runner

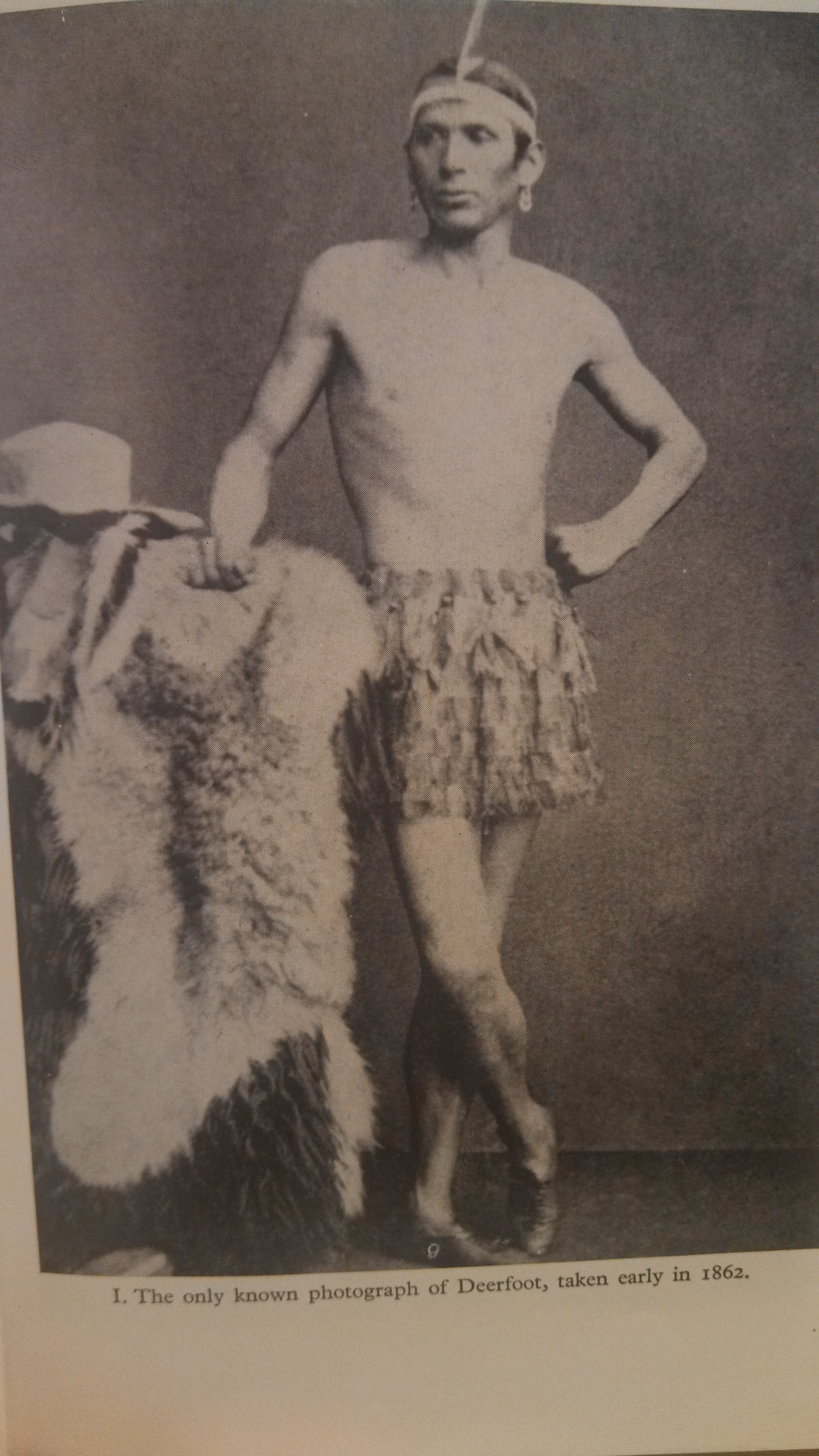
The only known photo of Deerfoot

Deerfoot (Seneca: Hut-goh-so-do-neh, c. 1828 – 18 January 1896, Cattaraugus Reservation) was an American Seneca runner. His most noted achievements took place in England.

== Biography ==
Deerfoot–Red Jacket, or Hut-goh-so-do-neh in his native tongue, was born into the Seneca people on the Cattaraugus Reservation in about the year 1828. Other sources claim his birth year was either 1830, 1826, or 1825. Deerfoot, also known as Lewis Bennett, was first recognized for his racing talent in 1856 when he won a five-mile race in Fredonia at the Chautauqua County Fair by running it in 25:00 flat, cashing in on a $50 purse. Deerfoot sometimes raced under his fondly dealt nickname Red Jacket, a title that both referenced a celebrated Seneca leader and cited his colorful and often revealing racing outfits.

In a race in New York City, Deerfoot gained attention while running against the English national team coached by his future manager, George Martin. He went to England in 1861 under Martin to embark on a 20-month running tour, and was matched against the best long-distance runners in the world, defeating nearly all of them. He lost a six-mile race against Edward (or Teddy) Mills in September 1861, but defeated John (or Jack) White — “the Gateshead Clipper” — in a four-mile contest a few days later, and directly after outran both of them in a 10-mile championship. He beat John Levett and Mills (12 miles) at Dublin for $500 in 65 minutes, and Howitt — the “American Deer” — in London (four miles). Deerfoot set world records of 10 miles in 51:26 and 12 miles in 1:02:02 while on his tour. Deerfoot's only loss in the United States came in 1859 to Dave Ford from Wilmington, Delaware. The race was held at the Old Scheutzen Park which is called now Wawa Set Park. Deerfoot lost by 2 minutes 3 seconds. It was recorded in the Delmarva Star newspaper.

During Deerfoot's time in England, it is safe to generalize that he won many races with style, and maintained a rowdy nightlife off the track to back up his "exotic" persona he deployed to gain fan attention.

Deerfoot had four children with Ida Yellow Blanket, also of the Cattaraugus Reservation. The couple had three sons and one daughter: Augustus, Juila, Dwight, and Heenan Bennett, all born between 1852 and 1857.

== Persona, tactics, and fans ==
Deerfoot gained fame and attention for many reasons in England: his scorching fast times, his infuriating tactics, and his scantily clad athletic garb attracted a wide variety of fans. One race was recorded to have up to 13,000 fans, with an additional 2,000 arriving to the event by train. To his credit, Deerfoot never did run a boring race; his tactics for running events enraged his competition and enlivened spectators: he would pursue his opponent until he felt he could maintain a lead over them, then proceed to quickly pass his opponent, jog slow enough in front for his opponent to catch up, then pull away, only to fall back to only a few feet ahead of his opponent and repeat the cycle of slowing down and speeding up until the finish of the event. Running with an inconsistent pace was unheard of in those days, and often forced his opposition to fall off of their paces early on, giving him a clear advantage. This game of cat and mouse invigorated fans, and also ensured that Deerfoot would only run hard enough to defeat his opponents and not waste energy so as to continue on in his extremely rigorous running tours across the English countryside.

Much of Deerfoot's popularity was contingent upon his maintenance of his "savage" character. At his manager's prodding, Deerfoot would placate the most highly respected of viewers by several well documented acts. In the most famous of which, Deerfoot would sit at a bar with a guest of honor until late hours of the night, then allowed his entourage to watch him retire on his hotel room floor wrapped in a bear skin vehemently rejecting to sleep in the bed. In other circumstances, Deerfoot was encouraged to deal out warrior-whoops to the public, of which stories grew dramatic and embellished.

While many of these acts were staged to gain publicity, it is clear that Deerfoot preferred his moccasins over the popular track spikes, which were invented in the 1850s and had become popular during his racing reign. The spikes had risen in popularity due to the plushy nature of tracks at the time period, which were often mulch based instead of compacted materials people run on currently.

In reality, and away from the eye of the camera, Deerfoot was known as being simple, soft-spoken, humble, and introverted.

Legends from his local Snipe Clan of the Seneca boast of a tale in which Deerfoot outpaced a horse on such a long run that the animal died of exhaustion.

== Maintaining champion status ==
In order to preserve his status as the best runner in the world, George Martin, Deerfoot's agent, resolved to fix races in a running troupe that toured England, utilizing top name runners to bolster Deerfoot's shining reputation. The "Deerfoot Troupe" raced every day of the week except Sunday, with the runners being forced to walk to some of the races, sometimes great distance. The group was recognized quickly as a farce and although the tour continued through England, Martin resolved to force the runners onward. Deerfoot decided that at this point he needed to quit the troupe and run competitions again, with the hope of bringing gold and trophies home to his Seneca tribe

With the public betting against him, Deerfoot first lost a race, then regained his champion caliber career, beating new and old top runners in England alike. Deerfoot's last race ended with him dropping out after three laps, watching 2 men: Jack White, and William Lang to coast past him after lapping him twice. His manager angrily grilled Deerfoot for losing so badly, to which Deerfoot reportedly contorted: "I have never trained," referencing his manager's nature of scheduling Deerfoot's tours so tightly he had no time to rest, let alone train. After this race, Deerfoot collected his substantial and regained winnings and quietly left for America.

== Death ==
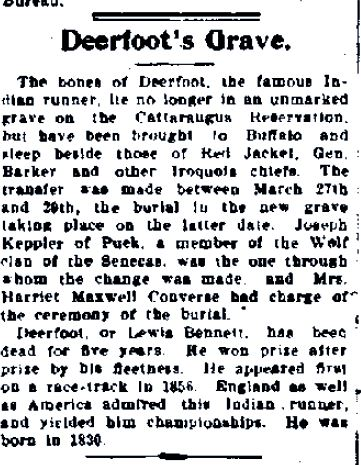
The bones of Deerfoot, the famous Indian runner, lie no longer in an unmarked grave on the Cattaraugus Reservation, but have been brought to Buffalo and sleep beside those of Red Jacket, Gen. Barker, and other Iroquois chiefs. The transfer was made between March 27th and 29th, the burial in the grave taking place on the latter date. Joseph Keppler of Puck, a member of the Wolf clan of Senecas, was the one through whom the change was made, and Mrs. Harriet Maxwell Converse had charge of the ceremony of the burial. Deerfoot, or Lewis Bennett, has been dead for 5 years. He won prize after prize by his fleetness. He appeared first on the racetrack in 1865. England as well as America admired this Indian runner and yielded him championships. He was born in 1830.

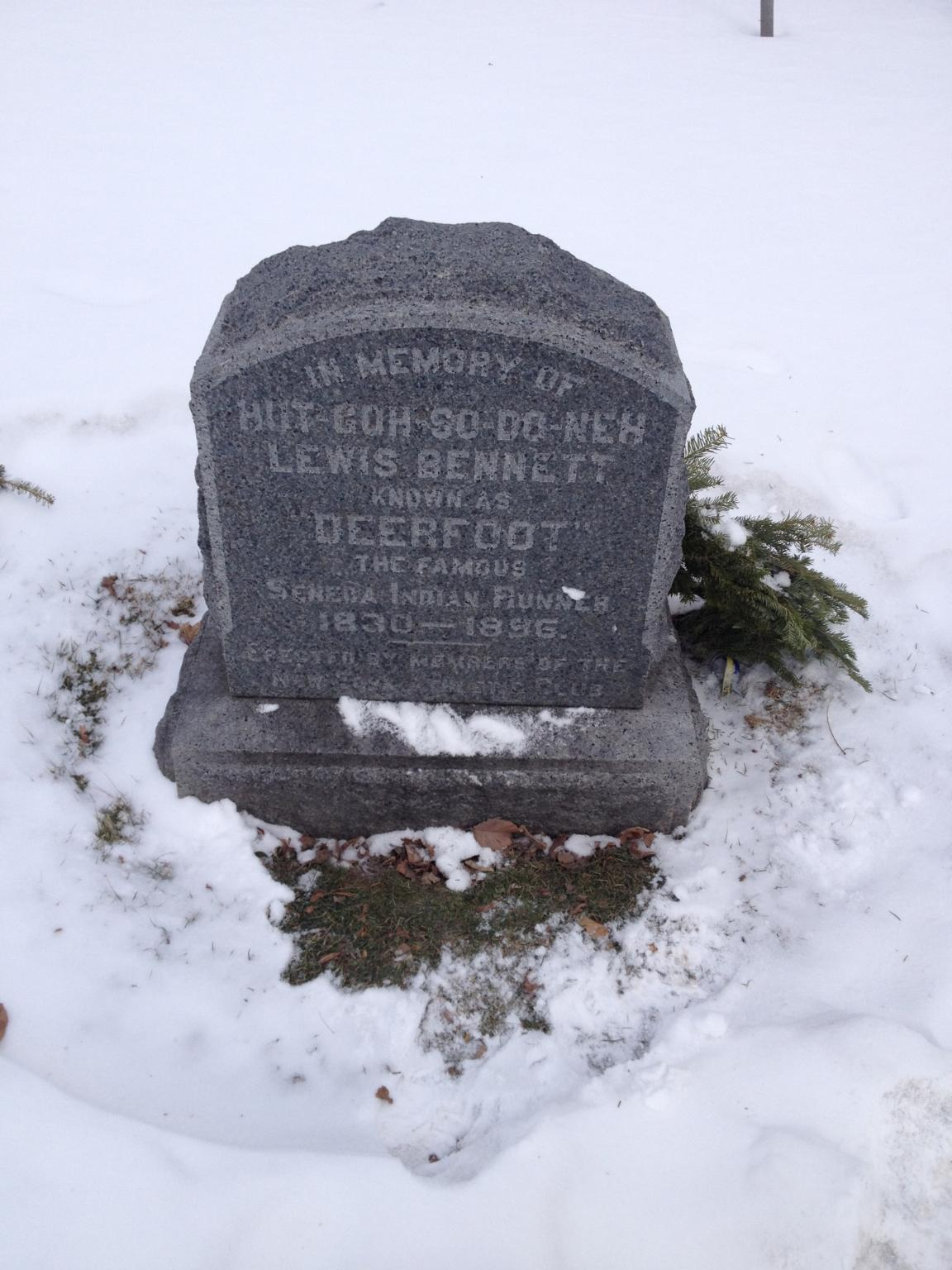
Deerfoot's gravestone at Forest Lawn Cemetery in Buffalo, New York

Deerfoot's obituary in The New York Times illustrated his worldwide fame during his lifetime, even though most of his feats took place in England and abroad.

Deerfoot's grave was moved in 1901, from an unmarked grave to his current resting place in Forest Lawn Cemetery in Buffalo, New York.

== See also ==
- Deerfoot of the Shawnee, a fictional Indian brave based on the historical Deerfoot
- Deerfoot-Bad Meat, a long-distance runner of the Blackfoot tribe named in his honor

== Sources ==
- Edward Seldon Sears (2001). "Deerfoot — Greatest American Distance Runner of the 19th Century". Running Through the Ages. Jefferson, North Carolina: McFarland & Co. Inc. pp. 132–139. ISBN 0-7864-0971-1.
