= Deerfoot-Bad Meat =

Canadian Siksika runner

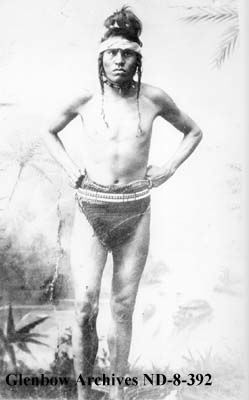
Deerfoot - Bad Meat (Appi-Ka-ees) c.1880 courtesy Glenbow Archives

Deerfoot-Bad Meat or Api-kai-ees meaning "scabby dried meat" or "bad meat" (born 1864 - 1897) was a Siksika runner from Western Canada whose most noted achievement was winning the 1886 Calgary Star-Rink Endurance Race.

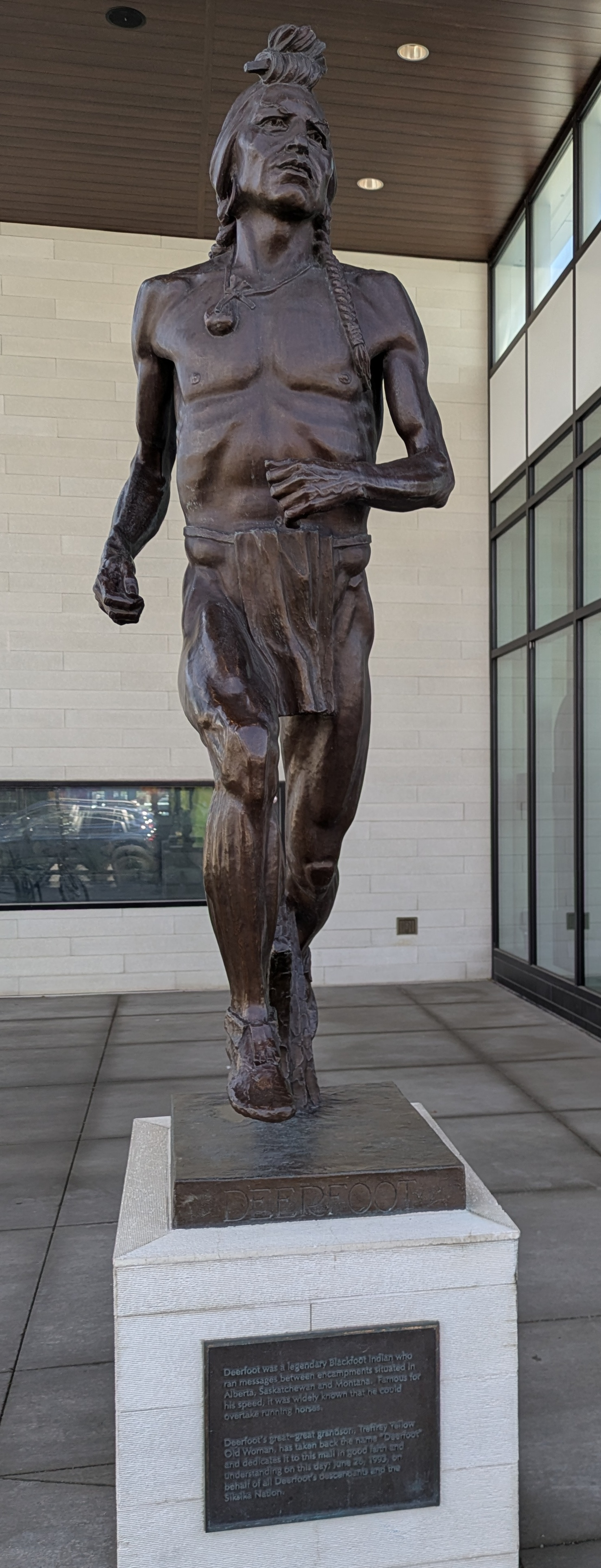
Statue of Deerfoot at Deerfoot City mall in Calgary

== Biography ==
Deerfoot-Bad Meat was born c. 1864 on traditional Blackfoot territory (now the Blackfoot Indian Reserve) on the Western Canadian plains. He was the son of Nato-West-Sitsi (Medicine Fire) and nephew of Big Chief Crowfoot. Deerfoot-Bad Meat followed the Blackfoot tradition at the time of having several wives and several children; he died on February 24, 1897, in Calgary.

== Career as a runner ==
By 1880, Deerfoot-Bad Meat had become an exceptional long-distance runner working as a messenger for the Blackfoot Confederacy running between camps in the North-West Territories and the Montana Territory.

Deerfoot-Bad Meat first began running in minor local races when he was discovered by a Calgary gambling group called The Syndicate. The group was interested in finding local runners who could compete with continental champions for gambling money. Around the same time the indoor track "Star-Rink" was being built in Calgary which would serve as a venue for these championship foot-races. In 1883, in one of his first professional races, Deerfoot-Bad Meat defeated professional runner James Green and Blackfoot runner Little Plume in a four-day endurance race. In 16 hours, he completed 84 miles (135 km) and 6 laps. Following this, Api-kai-ees was officially given the professional name Deerfoot, after the original Seneca runner Deerfoot-Red Jacket.

Deerfoot-Bad Meat continued to run successfully in many more local races in the Calgary area and beyond, defeating challengers from as far away as Europe. In 1886 he won the prestigious Dominion Day 1-mile (1.6 km) race, coming within a second of breaking the world record for that distance.

Later that autumn, in order to showcase Canadian talent to the world, multiple gambling groups decided to organize a major 10-mile (16 km) race in Calgary. Deerfoot-Bad Meat was entered to run against the favourite J.W. Strokes of Birmingham, England, and George Irvine of Winnipeg, Manitoba. In what was considered the race of the decade, Deerfoot-Bad Meat overwhelmingly defeated Stokes and Irvine, beating the Englishman by a full lap. Not happy with what the Europeans considered a humiliating defeat, the handlers of the British runner claimed a miscount of laps and the race was invalidated. The organizers rescheduled a new race for several days later. Nevertheless, being already suspicious of the British team, Deerfoot-Bad Meat stepped onto the race track only after giving Stokes a six-lap head-start in order to dispel any possibility of another miscount. Deerfoot nevertheless passed the Birmingham racer and finished the ten miles in 54 minutes 30 seconds.

== Later career and death ==
Disillusioned and disappointed with the corruption involving the gambling group The Syndicate, Deerfoot parted ways with his team in 1886 and began running as an independent with mixed success. Deerfoot died in 1897 of tuberculosis in the NWMP guardhouse at Fort Calgary and is buried in an unmarked grave in Calgary.

In 1974 the City of Calgary renamed a major freeway, Deerfoot Trail, as well as an industrial centre and shopping venue (Deerfoot City) in his honour.
